= Nagorno-Karabakh ceasefire agreement =

Nagorno-Karabakh ceasefire agreement may refer to:

- 2020 Nagorno-Karabakh ceasefire agreement
- 2023 Nagorno-Karabakh ceasefire agreement
