= Ashot Danielyan (politician) =

Artsakhi politician

- Աշոտ Դանիելյան
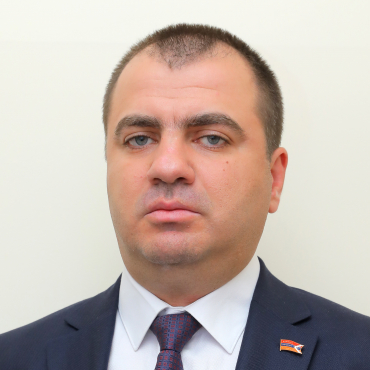
- Ashot Danielyan in 2020

President of Artsakh (in exile)
- Acting
- In office 21 May 2025 – 2 July 2026
- Preceded by: Samvel Shahramanyan

Speaker of the National Assembly
- In office 21 May 2025 – 2 July 2026
- Appointed by: National Assembly (Artsakh)
- Preceded by: Davit Ishkhanyan
- Succeeded by: Gagik Baghunts

Personal details
- Party: Free Motherland
- Education: Yerevan State University

Ashot Kamoy Danielyan (Armenian: Աշոտ Կամոյի Դանիելյան; born 3 September 1984) is an Artsakhi politician who served as Speaker of the National Assembly of Artsakh and Acting President of the government-in-exile of the Republic of Artsakh from 21 May 2025 until 2 July 2026.
