= Azat u ankakh Artsakh =

National anthem of Artsakh

English: Free and independent Artsakh
- Ազատ ու անկախ Արցախ; Государственный гимн Республики Арцах
- In-exile anthem of the Republic of Artsakh
- Lyrics: Vardan Hakobyan
- Music: Armen Nasibyan
- Adopted: 1992; 2024*
- Relinquished: 2023 (dissolution of the Republic of Artsakh)
- Preceded by: Anthem of the Azerbaijan Soviet Socialist Republic
- Succeeded by: March of Azerbaijan

Audio sample
- file; help

"Free and independent Artsakh" (Armenian: Ազատ ու անկախ Արցախ, "Azat u ankakh Artsakh") is the national anthem of the Republic of Artsakh, a breakaway state in Transcaucasia. Adopted in 1992, the anthem was written by Vardan Hakobyan and composed by Armen Nasibyan.

== History ==
Following the declaration of independence of the Nagorno-Karabakh Republic, by the decision of the Supreme Council of the Republic on 17 November 1992, the song "Free and Independent Artsakh" became the national anthem of the Republic. On 26 January 1993, the Supreme Council of the Republic adopted a decree "On the National Anthem of the Nagorno-Karabakh Republic". The document was signed by Karen Baburyan, acting chairman of the Supreme Council.

The anthem was performed and sounded during sessions of the National Assembly and other state events, mass events dedicated to the struggle of the residents of Artsakh for independence, and actions of the Armenian opposition.

The lyrics of the anthem are directly linked to the centuries-old history of the Artsakh region. The text mentions the Mrav range, Mount Kirs, and the Tartar river.

== Lyrics ==
=== Armenian original ===
Words of the song in Armenian

Ազատ ու անկախ Արցախ,
Քո տուն-ամրոցը կերտեցինք,
Պատմությունը մեր երկրի
Մեր սուրբ արյամբ մենք սերտեցինք։

Դու բերդ ես անառիկ,
Բարձունք սրբազան, վեհ անուն,
Մասունք աստվածային,
Քեզնով ենք հավերժանում։

Դու մեր լույս հայրենիք,
Երկիր, հայրենյաց դուռ սիրո
Ապրիր դու միշտ խաղաղ,
Մեր հին ու նոր Ղարաբաղ։

Քաջերն ենք մենք հայկազուն,
Մռավ ենք, Քիրս ենք ու Թարթառ,
Մեր վանքերով լեռնապահ՝
Անհաղթելի մի բուռ աշխարհ։

Spelling of these words using the Latin alphabet

Azát u ankáx Artsáx,
Kho tun-amrótse kertetsínkh,
Patmuthyúne mer yerkrí
Mer surb aryámb menkh sertetsínkh.

Du berd yes anarrík,
Bardzúnkh srbazán, veh anún,
Masúnkh astvatzayín,
Kheznóv yenkh haverzhanúm.

Du mer luys Hayreníkh,
Yerkír, Hayrenyáts durr siró
Aprír du misht xaghágh,
Mer hin u nor Gharabágh.

Khajérn yenkh menkh Haykazún,
Mrrav yenkh, Khirs yenkh u Tharthárr,
Mer vankheróv lerrnapáh,
Anhaghthelí mi burr ashxárh.

Spelling of these words using the Cyrillic alphabet

Азат у анках Арцах,
Қо тун-амроцә кертецинқ,
Патмуҭюнә мер еркри
Мер сурб арямб мэнқ сертецинқ.

Ду берд ес анаррик,
Бардзунқ сәрбазан, веҳ анун,
Масунқ астваҵаин,
Қезнов енқ ҳавержанум.

Ду мер луйс Ҳайрениқ,
Еркир, ҳайреняц дурр сиро
Априр ду мишт хағағ,
Мер ҳин у нор Ғарабағ.

Қаҗерн енқ менқ ҳайказун,
Мәррав енк, Қирс енқ у Ҭарҭарр,
Мэр ванқеров леррнапаҳ,
Анҳағҭели ми бурр ашхарҳ.

Pronunciation of these words using the IPA

[ɑ.ˈzɑt u ɑŋ.ˈkɑχ ɑɾ.ˈt͡sʰɑχ ǀ]
[kʰɔ tun ɑm.ˈɾɔ.t͡sʰə kɛɾ.tɛ.ˈt͡sʰiŋkʰ ǀ]
[pɑt.mu.ˈtʰju.nə mɛɾ jɛɾ.ˈkɾi ǀ]
[mɛɾ suɾb ɑɾ.ˈjɑmb mɛŋkʰ sɛɾ.tɛ.ˈt͡sʰiŋkʰ ǁ]

[du bɛɾtʰ‿ɛs ɑ.nɑ.ˈrik ǀ]
[bɑɾ.ˈd͡zuŋkʰ səɾ.bɑ.ˈzɑn vɛh ɑ.ˈnun ǀ]
[mɑ.ˈsuŋkʰ ɑst.vɑ.t͡sɑ.ˈjin ǀ]
[kʰɛz.ˈnɔv‿ɛŋkʰ hɑ.vɛɾ.ʒɑ.ˈnum ǁ]

[du mɛɾ lujs hɑj.ɾɛ.ˈnikʰ ǀ]
[jɛɾ.ˈkiɾ hɑj.ɾɛn.ˈjɑt͡sʰ dur si.ˈɾɔ ǀ]
[ɑp.ˈɾiɾ du miʃt χɑ.ˈʁɑʁ ǀ]
[mɛɾ hin u nɔɾ ʁɑ.ɾɑ.ˈbɑʁ ǁ]

[kʰɑ.ˈd͡ʒɛɾn‿ɛŋkʰ mɛŋkʰ hɑj.kɑ.ˈzun ǀ]
[mə.ˈrɑv‿ɛŋkʰ kʰiɾs‿ɛŋkʰ u tʰɑɾ.ˈtʰɑr ǀ]
[mɛɾ vɑŋ.kʰɛ.ˈɾɔv lɛr.nɑ.ˈpɑh ǀ]
[ɑn.hɑʁ.tʰɛ.ˈli mi bur ɑʃ.ˈχɑɾ̥ ǁ]

=== English translation ===
Artsakh, free and independent,
Our home fortress now erect
Our country's greatest stories,
Forged by our blood.

You're a fortress unassailable,
A mountain holy, a name noble,
A blessing divine,
Through you made eternal.

You're the land that gives us light,
The gate of love for the fatherland.
May you always live in peace,
Our olden modern Karabakh.

We're Hayk's brave sons and daughters,
Like Mrav, Kirs, everlasting Tartar.
With our temples in mountains high
Let's keep undefeatable our land.

=== Russian translation ===
Свободный и независимый
Арцах, как крепость, строим мы,
Героев кровью писана
История моей страны.

Ты — святыня в веках
Непреступной твердыней стоишь,
Богом хранимый Арцах,
Ты гордое имя хранишь.

Ты, Отчизна, — наш свет,
Храм Любви и в мольбах и в сердцах.
Помним мы предков завет —
Пусть в мире живёт Карабах!

Армяне, мы сила страны,
Как Мрав, как Кирс и, как вечный Тартар.
Верою предков защищены,
Храним наш край, наш Божий дар.

== See also ==
- Mer Hayrenik – National anthem of Armenia
