= Samvel Shahramanyan =

President of Artsakh in 2023

- Սամվել Շահրամանյան

5th President of Artsakh
- In office 10 September 2023 – 21 May 2025 (Note: In exile since the Expulsion of Nagorno-Karabakh Armenians in October 2023. The Republic of Artsakh legally disestablished itself on 1 January 2024. Shahramanyan acted as the leader of the government-in-exile until 21 May 2025)
- Preceded by: Arayik Harutyunyan; Davit Ishkhanyan (acting)
- Succeeded by: Ashot Danielyan (acting)

State Minister of Artsakh
- In office 31 August 2023 – 10 September 2023
- President: Davit Ishkhanyan (acting)
- Preceded by: Gurgen Nersisyan
- Succeeded by: Artur Harutyunyan

Personal details
- Born: 1 December 1978 (age 47) Stepanakert, Nagorno-Karabakh Autonomous Oblast, Soviet Union (now Khankendi, Azerbaijan)
- Party: Independent
- Children: 3
- Education: Artsakh University

Military service
- Branch/service: Artsakh Defence Army
- Years of service: 1996–1999
- Rank: Major general

Samvel Sergeyevich Shahramanyan (Note: Armenian: Սամվել Սերգեյի Շահրամանյան) (born 1 December 1978) is an Armenian politician who served as the 5th president of the Republic of Artsakh. He was elected as the President on 9 September 2023 and sworn in the following day. After the fall of Artsakh, he served as the leader of the Republic of Artsakh government in exile until 21 May 2025.

He was also State Minister from August to September 2023. He also served as Minister of Military Patriotic Upbringing, Youth, Sports and Tourism, Secretary of the Security Council of Artsakh and a Major General in the Artsakh Defence Army.

== Early life and career ==
Shahramanyan was born in Stepanakert on 1 December 1978, in what was then the Nagorno-Karabakh Autonomous Oblast. He graduated in 1999 from the economics department of the Artsakh University. From 1996 and 1999, he served in the Artsakh Defense Army and then moved to the Artsakh National Security Service, of which he was director between 2018 and 2020 upon appointment by President Bako Sahakyan.

== Political career ==
=== Ministerial positions in Artsakh ===
In May 2020, Shahramanyan was appointed by President Arayik Harutyunyan as Minister of Military Patriotic Upbringing, Youth, Sports and Tourism as part of the latter's government.

On 29 August 2023, Harutyunyan stated that he was considering resigning and going to serve in Artsakh's militia. On 31 August, Harutyunyan announced his resignation as president of the Republic of Artsakh along with State Minister Gurgen Nersisyan. Before his resignation, in his final decree, Harutyunyan appointed Shahramanyan as the new State Minister, giving him broad powers.

=== 2023 election ===
On 6 September 2023, it became known that three opposition parliamentary factions (Justice, Armenian Revolutionary Federation and Democratic Party of Artsakh) nominated Shahramanyan as their presidential candidate. Later Shahramanyan's candidacy was supported by the largest faction of the Parliament, Free Motherland-UCA. In the presidential election held on 9 September, Shahramanyan, who was the sole candidate, was elected in a 22–1 vote out of 23 deputies present.

=== Azerbaijani offensive, exodus and dissolution of Artsakh ===
Nine days after Shahramanyan was sworn in, Azerbaijan launched a military offensive against Artsakh. The following day, the Artsakhi government reached a ceasefire agreement and agreed to disarm. On 24 September, a mass evacuation of ethnic-Armenian civilians began, citing fears of persecution and ethnic cleansing if they remain. On 28 September, Shahramanyan signed a decree stating that all state institutions would be dissolved by 1 January 2024, bringing the existence of the Republic of Artsakh to an end.

=== Exile ===
On 4 October, it was reported that Shahramanyan had left Artsakh for Armenia. He was spotted in Yerevan on 16 October. On 22 December 2023, Shahramanyan said that there was no official document stipulating the dissolution of government institutions, and his office stated that it was "empty paper". In March 2024, Shahramanyan declared the Government of Artsakh as a government-in-exile alongside their institutions. This declaration was disavowed by Armenian Prime Minister Nikol Pashinyan, calling it a "security threat". On 21 May 2025, his presidential term expired. As a result, Ashot Danielyan, who was also elected President of the National Assembly in exile, assumed presidential powers.

== Personal life ==
Shahramanyan is married and has three children.

== See also ==
- President of Artsakh
- State Minister of Artsakh

== Notes ==
Political offices
| Preceded by Arayik Harutyunyan | President of Artsakh; 2023–2025 | Succeeded by Ashot Danielyan |
