= Republic of Artsakh (government in exile) =

Armenia-based entity since 2023

Republic of Artsakh Արցախի Հանրապետություն Artsakhi Hanrapetutyun (Armenian) Нагорно-Карабахская Республика Nagorno-Karabakhskaya Respublika (Russian)
- Flag Coat of arms
- Anthem: Ազատ ու անկախ Արցախ; Azat u ankakh Artsakh "Free and Independent Artsakh"
- Status: Government-in-exile
- Capital-in-exile: Yerevan
- Official languages: Armenian; Russian
- Government: Presidential republic
  - President: Vacant
  - State Minister: Nzhdeh Iskandaryan
  - Acting Speaker of the NA: Gagik Baghunts
- Legislature: National Assembly

The Republic of Artsakh (Note: Armenian: Արցախի Հանրապետություն, romanized: Arts'akhi Hanrapetut'yun; Russian: Нагорно-Карабахская Республика, romanized: Nagorno-Karabakhskaya Respublika.) was a de facto state in the South Caucasus between 1991 and 2023. Since 2023, it has continued as a government in exile based in Yerevan, Armenia.

== History ==
The predominantly Armenian-populated region of Nagorno-Karabakh was claimed by both the Azerbaijan Democratic Republic and the First Republic of Armenia when both countries became independent in 1918 after the fall of the Russian Empire. The Soviet Union established control over the area and created the Nagorno-Karabakh Autonomous Oblast (NKAO) within the Azerbaijan SSR in 1923. The First Nagorno-Karabakh War broke out in 1991 and ended with a ceasefire agreement in 1994 resulting in the Republic of Artsakh retaining control over the former NKAO and surrounding districts of Azerbaijan. In 2020, a new war was fought in the region, with Azerbaijan achieving victory and regaining all the surrounding occupied districts and a significant portion of Artsakh's claimed territory.

=== Government in exile ===
Following an Azerbaijani assault on 19 September 2023, Artsakh president Samvel Shahramanyan signed a decree on 28 September that year, stating that by 1 January 2024 all of its state institutions would be dissolved. However, on 22 December 2023, Shahramanyan said that there was no official document stipulating the dissolution of republic, and his office stated that it was "empty paper". The Republic of Artsakh continued as a government-in-exile based in Yerevan, Armenia.

The Armenian Prime Minister, Nikol Pashinyan, opposed the said government-in-exile, calling it a "security threat". On 28 March 2024, Pashinyan stated, "In Armenia, apart from the Government of the Republic of Armenia, no other government can exist." Some of Artsakh's leadership met with Bagrat Galstanyan, leader of the anti-government protests on 21 May 2024 in Yerevan. On 14 June 2024, Pashinyan threatened to crack down on Artsakh's leadership, saying they were encouraging anti-government protests in Yerevan.

On 21 May 2025, Samvel Shahramanyan's presidential term expired. As a result, Ashot Danielyan, who was also elected President/Speaker of the National Assembly in exile, assumed presidential powers.

However, on 2 July 2026, Danielyan announced his resignation from both posts, citing coordinated attacks and political pressure, leaving both positions vacant. Deputy Speaker Gagik Baghunts took over the duties of parliamentary leadership as Acting Speaker. Baghunts said there was no pressure from the Armenian authorities, but says it has to do with "complications surrounding 'Artsakhfruit'‌'s funds".

== Office holders ==
=== Presidents of the Republic of Artsakh in exile ===
President	Term of office	Party membership
Samvel Shahramanyan	10 September 2023 – 21 May 2025	Independent
Ashot Danielyan	21 May 2025 – 2 July 2026	Independent
Vacant	2 July 2026 – present	—

== Cabinet ==
The Republic of Artsakh's government in exile retains its constitutional institutions but no longer operates a full wartime-style cabinet after losing control of Nagorno-Karabakh in 2023. With the presidency remaining vacant following the resignation of Ashot Danielyan, current leadership is concentrated around State Minister Nzhdeh Iskandaryan and Acting Speaker of the National Assembly Gagik Baghunts, with other officials focused mainly on international representation, displaced Artsakh Armenians, and preservation of state institutions.

- Acting President: Vacant (since 2 July 2026; duties of parliamentary leadership temporarily assumed by Acting NA Speaker Gagik Baghunts)
- Acting Speaker of the National Assembly: Gagik Baghunts (as Deputy Speaker)
- State Minister: Nzhdeh Iskandaryan
- Human Rights Defender (Ombudsman): Gegham Stepanyan
- Artsakh Representative: Ara Puluzyan
- Chairman of the Artsakh Diocesan Council: Lernik Hovhannisyan
