= Artur Harutyunyan =

Politician from the Republic of Artsakh

- Արթուր Հարությունյան

State Minister of Artsakh
- In office 18 September 2023 – 20 May 2025
- President: Samvel Shahramanyan
- Preceded by: Samvel Shahramanyan
- Succeeded by: Nzhdeh Iskandaryan

Personal details
- Born: 20 January 1979 (age 47) Stepanakert, Nagorno-Karabakh Autonomous Oblast, Soviet Union (now Khankendi, Azerbaijan)
- Party: Free Motherland
- Relatives: Arayik Harutyunyan

Artur Harutyunyan (Armenian: Արթուր Հարությունյան; born 20 January 1979) is an Armenian politician from the Republic of Artsakh who served as its State Minister from 18 September 2023 to 1 January 2024. He announced his resignation as leader of the Free Homeland-UCA faction and a member of the National Assembly on 11 September 2023.

Political offices
Preceded by Samvel Shahramanyan	State Minister of Artsakh; 2023–2025	Succeeded by Nzhdeh Iskandaryan
