= Republic of Artsakh =

Breakaway state in the South Caucasus (1991–2023)

Republic of Artsakh Republic of Nagorno-Karabakh Արցախի Հանրապետություն Artsakhi Hanrapetutyun Нагорно-Карабахская Республика Nagorno-Karabakhskaya Respublika
- 1991–2023
- Flag (1992–2023) Coat of arms (1992–2023)
- Anthem: Ազատ ու անկախ Արցախ; Azat u ankakh Artsakh "Free and Independent Artsakh"
- Status: Unrecognised state; recognised by three non-UN-member states
- Capital and largest city: Stepanakert; 39°49′02″N 46°45′02″E
- Official languages: Armenian (Note: The constitution guarantees "the free use of other languages spread among the population".); Russian (Note: From 2021.)
- Ethnic groups (2015 census): 99.7% Armenians; 0.2% Russians; 0.1% other
- Demonym: Artsakhi
- Government: Unitary parliamentary republic (1991–1994) Unitary semi-presidential republic (1994–2017) Unitary presidential republic (2017–2023)
- President
  - 1994–1997 (first): Robert Kocharyan
  - 2023 (last): Samvel Shahramanyan
- Prime Minister
  - 1992 (first): Oleg Yesayan
  - 2023 (last): Artur Harutyunyan
- Legislature: National Assembly

Independence from the Soviet Union
  - 1st Nagorno-Karabakh War: 20 February 1988 – 12 May 1994
  - Proclamation of the republic: 2 September 1991
  - Independence referendum: 10 December 1991
  - 2nd Nagorno-Karabakh War: 27 September–10 November 2020
  - Azerbaijani blockade: 12 December 2022
  - Azerbaijani offensive: 19–20 September 2023
  - Capitulation: 28 September 2023
  - Expulsion: 1 October 2023

Area
- 1995: 11,458 km^{2} (4,424 sq mi)
- 2021: 3,170 km^{2} (1,220 sq mi)

Population
  - 1995: 125,000
  - 2021: 120,000
- GDP (PPP): 2019 estimate
  - Total: $713 million
  - Per capita: $4,803
- Currency: Artsakh dram; Armenian dram; (AMD)
- Time zone: UTC+4 (AMT)
- Calling code: +374 47 (Note: +374 97 for mobile phones.)
Preceded by	Succeeded by
Azerbaijan SSR; Nagorno-Karabakh AO	Azerbaijan; Republic of Artsakh (government in exile)
- Today part of: Azerbaijan

Artsakh, (Note: /ˈɑːrtsɑːx, -sæx/ ART-sa(h)kh) officially the Republic of Artsakh (Note: Armenian: Արցախի Հանրապետություն, romanised: Arts'akhi Hanrapetut'yun.) or the Republic of Nagorno-Karabakh, (Note: /nəˌɡɔːrnoʊ kərəˈbɑːk/ nə-GOR-noh kər-ə-BAHK; also Nagorno-Karabagh Republic or Nagorno-Karabakh Republic; Russian: Нагорно-Карабахская Республика, romanised: Nagorno-Karabakhskaya Respublika (НКР, NKR); Armenian: Լեռնային Ղարաբաղի Հանրապետություն, romanised: Lerrnayin Gharabaghi Hanrapetut'yun (ԼՂՀ, LGhH).) was a breakaway state in the South Caucasus whose territory was internationally recognised as part of Azerbaijan. Between 1991 and 2023, Artsakh controlled parts of the former Nagorno-Karabakh Autonomous Oblast of the Azerbaijani Soviet Socialist Republic, including its capital Stepanakert. It had been an enclave within Azerbaijan from the 2020 Nagorno-Karabakh war until the 2023 Azerbaijani offensive, when the Azerbaijani military took control over the remaining territory controlled by Artsakh, followed by the effective expulsion of the entire population. Its only overland access route to Armenia after the 2020 war was via the five-kilometre-wide (3.1 mi) Lachin corridor, which was placed under the supervision of Russian peacekeeping forces.

The predominantly Armenian-populated region of Nagorno-Karabakh was claimed by both the Azerbaijan Democratic Republic and the First Republic of Armenia when both countries became independent in 1918 after the fall of the Russian Empire. A brief war over the region broke out in 1920. The dispute was largely shelved after the Soviet Union established control over the area, and created the Nagorno-Karabakh Autonomous Oblast (NKAO) within the Azerbaijan SSR in 1923; however, throughout the Soviet period, Armenians in the NKAO were heavily discriminated against. The Soviet Azerbaijani authorities worked to suppress Armenian culture and identity in Nagorno-Karabakh, pressured Armenians to leave the region and encouraged Azerbaijanis to settle within it, although Armenians remained the majority population.

The local Armenians of the area, motivated by fears of cultural and physical erasure under government policies from Azerbaijan, began the 1988 Karabakh movement advocating for reunification (Miatsum) with Armenia. This was met with extreme violence from Azerbaijani authorities and civilians, escalating tensions and culminating in a referendum in 1991 which overwhelmingly opted for independence. The conflict erupted into a full-out war in 1992. The war was won by Artsakh with support from Armenia. Although a ceasefire agreement was signed in 1994, the frozen situation left the predominantly Armenian-populated territory de facto independent, with a self-proclaimed government in Stepanakert, but still heavily reliant on and closely integrated with Armenia, in many ways functioning as a de facto part of Armenia. Even though Armenia never officially recognised the region's independence, it became the main financial and military supporter of the territory. In 2017, a referendum in the area approved a new constitution that transformed the system of government from a semi-presidential to a presidential democracy with a unicameral legislature in addition to changing the name of the state from the Republic of Nagorno-Karabakh to the Republic of Artsakh, although both names remained official.

From 1994 until 2020, Armenian and Azerbaijani troops remained separated by a contested line of contact which saw sporadic deadly incidents during the intervening years. In 2020, a new war was fought in the region, with Azerbaijan achieving victory and regaining all the surrounding occupied districts and a significant portion of Artsakh's claimed territory. The Lachin corridor linking Artsakh to Armenia was blockaded by Azerbaijan in December 2022. In September 2023, Azerbaijan launched another military offensive. The government of Artsakh agreed to disarm and enter talks with Azerbaijan, resulting in the expulsion of all ethnic Armenians from the area. On 28 September 2023, the president of Artsakh signed a decree to dissolve all of the republic's institutions by 1 January 2024, though the president later attempted to annul this decree. By 1 October 2023, almost the entire population of the region had fled to Armenia, marking the end of a millennia-old Armenian presence in Nagorno-Karabakh.

== Etymology ==
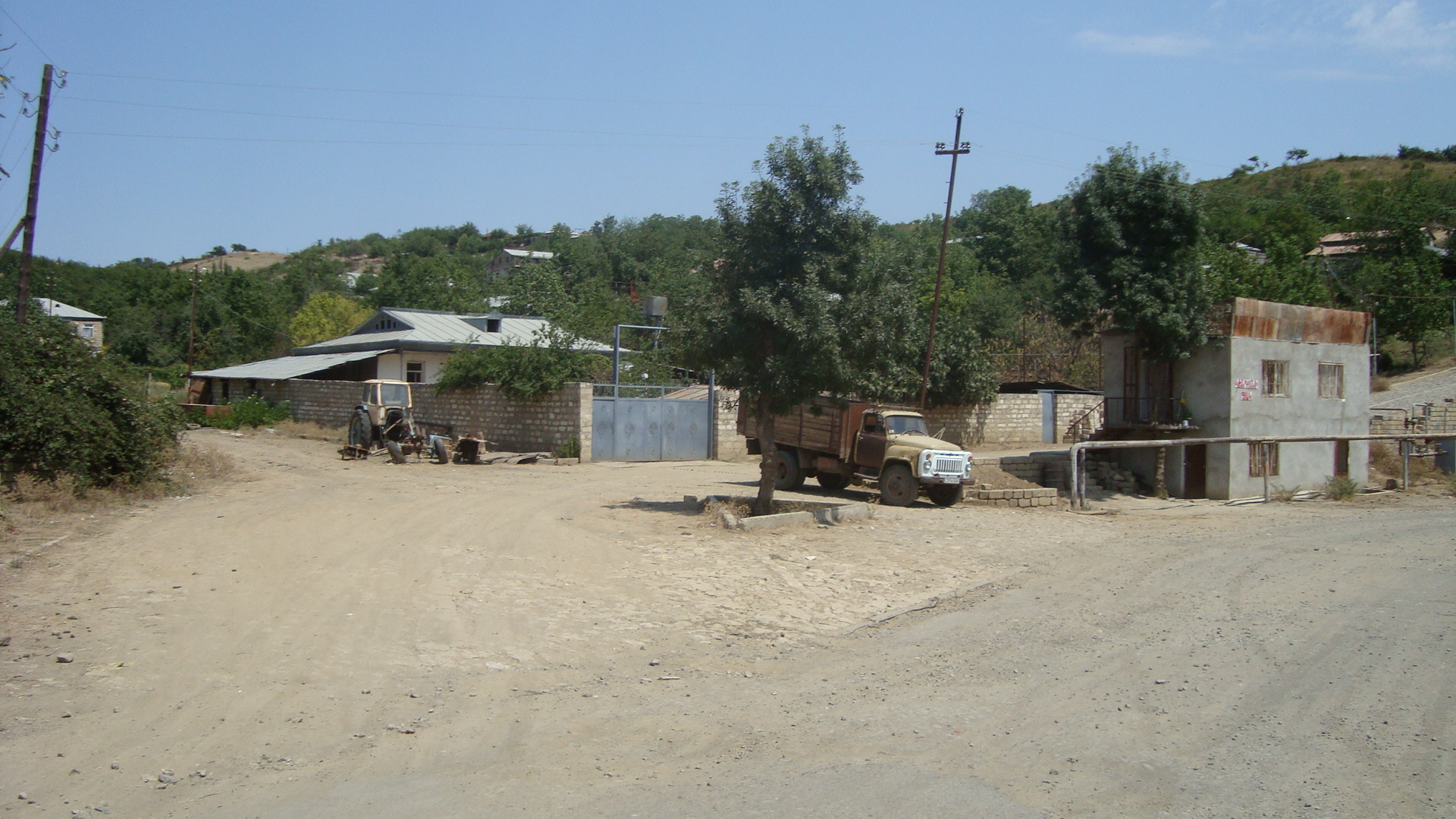
The town of Chartar in 2010

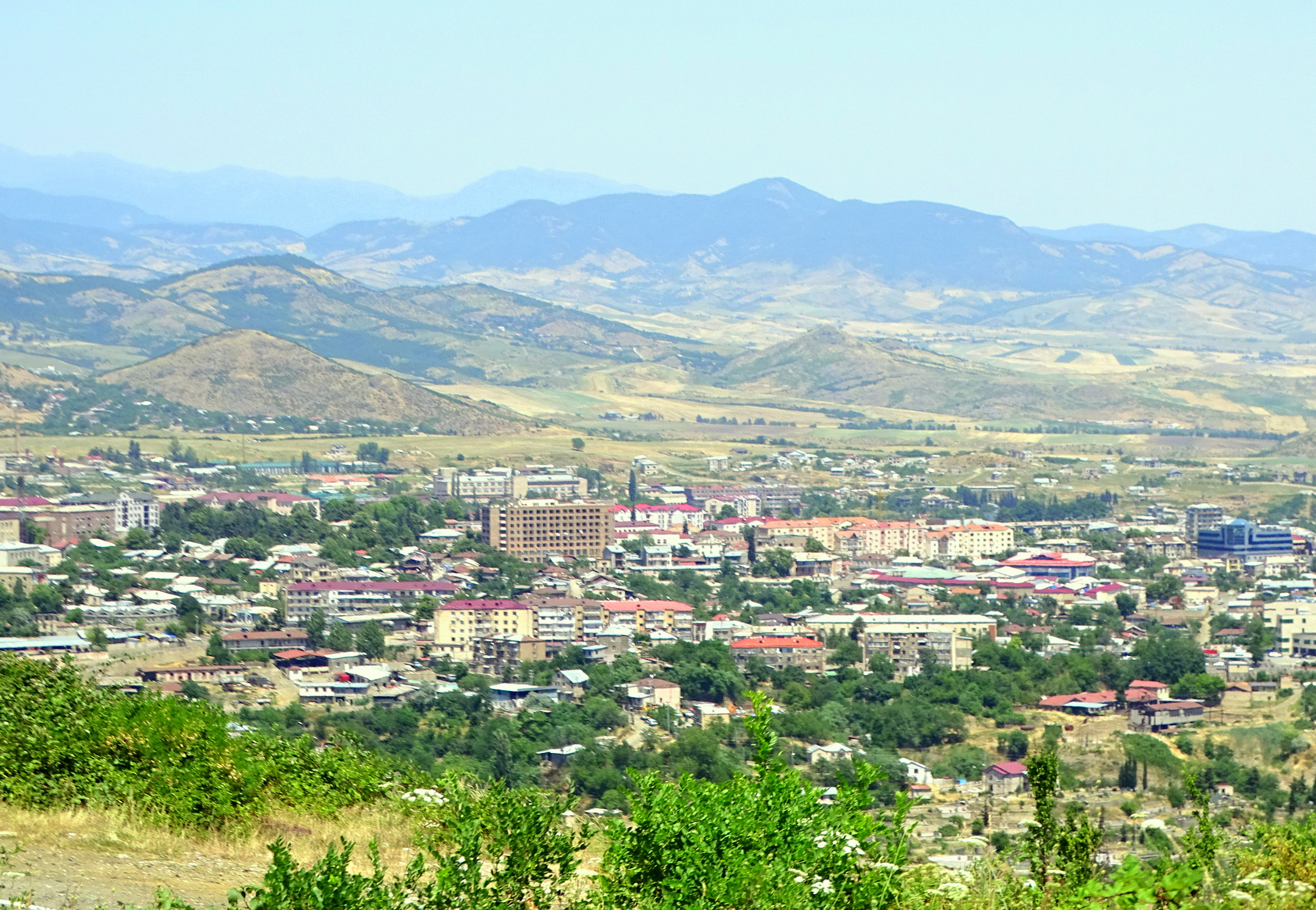
General view of the capital Stepanakert in 2015

According to scholars, inscriptions dating to the Urartian period mention the region under a variety of names: "Ardakh", "Urdekhe", and "Atakhuni". In his Geography, the classical historian Strabo refers to an Armenian region which he calls "Orchistene", which is believed by some to be a Greek version of the old name of Artsakh.

According to another hypothesis put forth by David M. Lang, the ancient name of Artsakh possibly derives from the name of King Artaxias I of Armenia (190–159 BC), founder of the Artaxiad dynasty and the kingdom of Greater Armenia.

Folk etymology holds that the name is derived from "Ar" (Aran) and "tsakh" (woods, garden) (i.e., the gardens of Aran Sisakean, the first nakharar of northeastern Armenia).

The name "Nagorno-Karabakh", commonly used in English, comes from the Russian name which means "Mountainous Karabakh". Karabakh is a Turkish/Persian word thought to mean "black garden". The Azerbaijani name for the area, "Dağlıq Qarabağ", has the same meaning as the Russian name. The term "Artsakh" lacks the non-Armenian influences present in "Nagorno-Karabakh". Artsakh was revived for use in the 19th century, and was the preferred term used by the population, in English and Russian as well as Armenian. "Mountainous Karabakh" was sometimes employed directly as part of the official English name, "Republic of Mountainous Karabakh". This reflected an attempt to shift away from the negative associations thought linked with "Nagorno-Karabakh" due to the war.

== History ==
=== Dissolution of the USSR; First Nagorno-Karabakh War (1988–1994) ===
Map of Artsakh and surrounding territories. The area surrounded by red borders corresponds to territory de facto controlled by the Republic of Artsakh from 1994 until 2020. Yellow regions correspond to the Soviet-era Nagorno Karabakh Autonomous Oblast (NKAO), with yellow striped regions controlled by Azerbaijan but claimed by the Republic of Artsakh. Green striped regions correspond to territories outside the former NKAO held by Artsakh until the end of the Second Nagorno-Karabakh War.

In the lead-up to the dissolution of the Soviet Union, the Nagorno-Karabakh conflict was revitalised. In 1987–88, a mass movement started in Nagorno-Karabakh and Soviet Armenia calling on the Soviet authorities to transfer the region to Armenia, citing self-determination laws in the Soviet constitution. Starting with the pogrom against Armenians in the Azerbaijani town of Sumgait in February 1988, the conflict became increasingly violent, and attempts by Moscow to resolve the dispute failed. In summer 1988, the legislatures of Soviet Armenia and the NKAO passed resolutions declaring the unification of Nagorno-Karabakh with Armenia, which were rejected by Azerbaijani and central Soviet authorities.

Azerbaijan declared its independence from the Soviet Union on 30 August 1991, and Azerbaijan formally achieved its sovereignty following a referendum on 21 September 1991. Later, on 27 November 1991, the parliament revoked the autonomous status of the Nagorno-Karabakh region, prompting local leaders to call for a referendum on independence from Azerbaijan on 10 December 1991. The result saw approximately 99 percent of ethnic Armenians in the Nagorno-Karabakh region vote for separation. Artur Mkrtchyan was chosen as president of the Nagorno-Karabakh region following parliamentary elections on 28 December 1991. On 2 January 1992, President Ayaz Mutallibov of Azerbaijan placed the Nagorno-Karabakh region under direct presidential control, and Nagorno-Karabakh formally declared its independence from Azerbaijan on 6 January 1992.

The declaration was rejected by newly independent Azerbaijan, leading to the outbreak of full-scale war with Armenia and Nagorno-Karabakh on one side and Azerbaijan on the other. The First Nagorno-Karabakh War ended with a ceasefire in May 1994, with Armenian forces controlling practically the entire territory of the former Nagorno-Karabakh Autonomous Oblast as well as most of seven adjacent districts of Azerbaijan. According to UNHCR, the conflict resulted in over 600,000 internally displaced people within Azerbaijan.

=== De facto post-war independence (1994–2020) ===
The Republic of Artsakh became a de facto independent country, though closely integrated with Armenia, while its territory remained internationally recognised as part of the Republic of Azerbaijan. Professor Matt Qvortrup considered it hypocritical that Western Europe countries had eagerly recognised the succession of several states from Yugoslavia, ignoring the laws of territorial integrity, but simultaneously did not show the same interest for the Nagorno-Karabakh referendum, noting "the practice of independence referendums seemingly owes more to national interest than to adherence to principles of jurisprudence".

Intermittent fighting over the region continued after the 1994 ceasefire without significant territorial changes, while long-standing international mediation attempts to create a peace process were initiated by the OSCE Minsk Group in 1994.

=== Second Nagorno-Karabakh War (2020), Azerbaijan gains ===
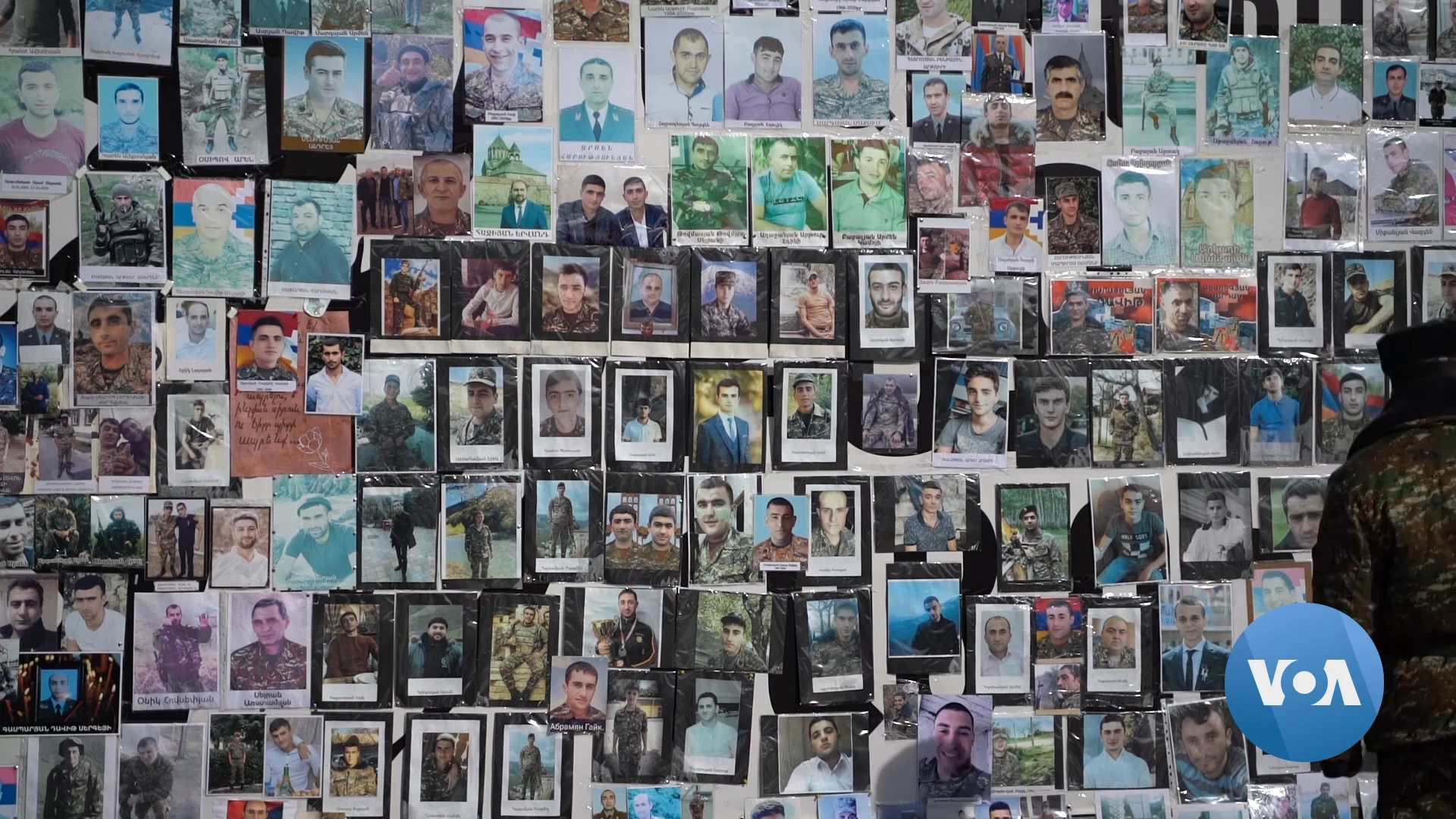
Wall with images of fallen Armenian soldiers during the Second Nagorno-Karabakh War

On 27 September 2020, a war broke out between Armenia and Azerbaijan over Artsakh. Fighting continued until November, and Azerbaijan recaptured territories, primarily in the southern part of the region, as well as the strategic town of Shushi. A ceasefire agreement signed on 10 November 2020 between Armenia, Azerbaijan, and Russia declared an end to the renewed fighting, and established that Armenia would withdraw from remaining occupied territories surrounding Nagorno-Karabakh over the next month. The agreement included provisions for a Russian peacekeeping force to deploy to the region, with Russian President Vladimir Putin stating that the ceasefire agreement would "create the conditions for a long-term settlement". The war may have claimed thousands of lives.

=== Aftermath of 2020 war ===
After the 2020 war, the Republic of Artsakh maintained control over the areas of the former oblast that had not been captured during the war.

In 2021, Russia, Azerbaijan, and Armenia held a trilateral meeting about Artsakh. This was expected to be the first of a regular series of meetings between the three countries, per an agreement to promote economic and infrastructure development throughout the region.

=== Blockade (2022–2023) ===
In December 2022, Azerbaijanis claiming to be environmental activists blocked the Lachin corridor, the sole road connecting Nagorno-Karabakh to Armenia and the outside world. On 23 April 2023, Azerbaijani forces installed a checkpoint on the Lachin corridor. The blockade led to a humanitarian crisis for the population in Artsakh; imports of essential goods were blocked, as well as humanitarian convoys of the Red Cross and the Russian peacekeepers, trapping the 120,000 residents of the region. Limited traffic was conducted by Russian peacekeepers and the International Committee of the Red Cross to transport patients in need of medical care and provide humanitarian supplies. However, from 15 June 2023, Azerbaijan intensified the blockade, blocking all passage of food, fuel, and medicine from the Red Cross and the Russian peacekeepers through the Lachin corridor.

=== 2023 Azerbaijani offensive, exodus, and dissolution ===
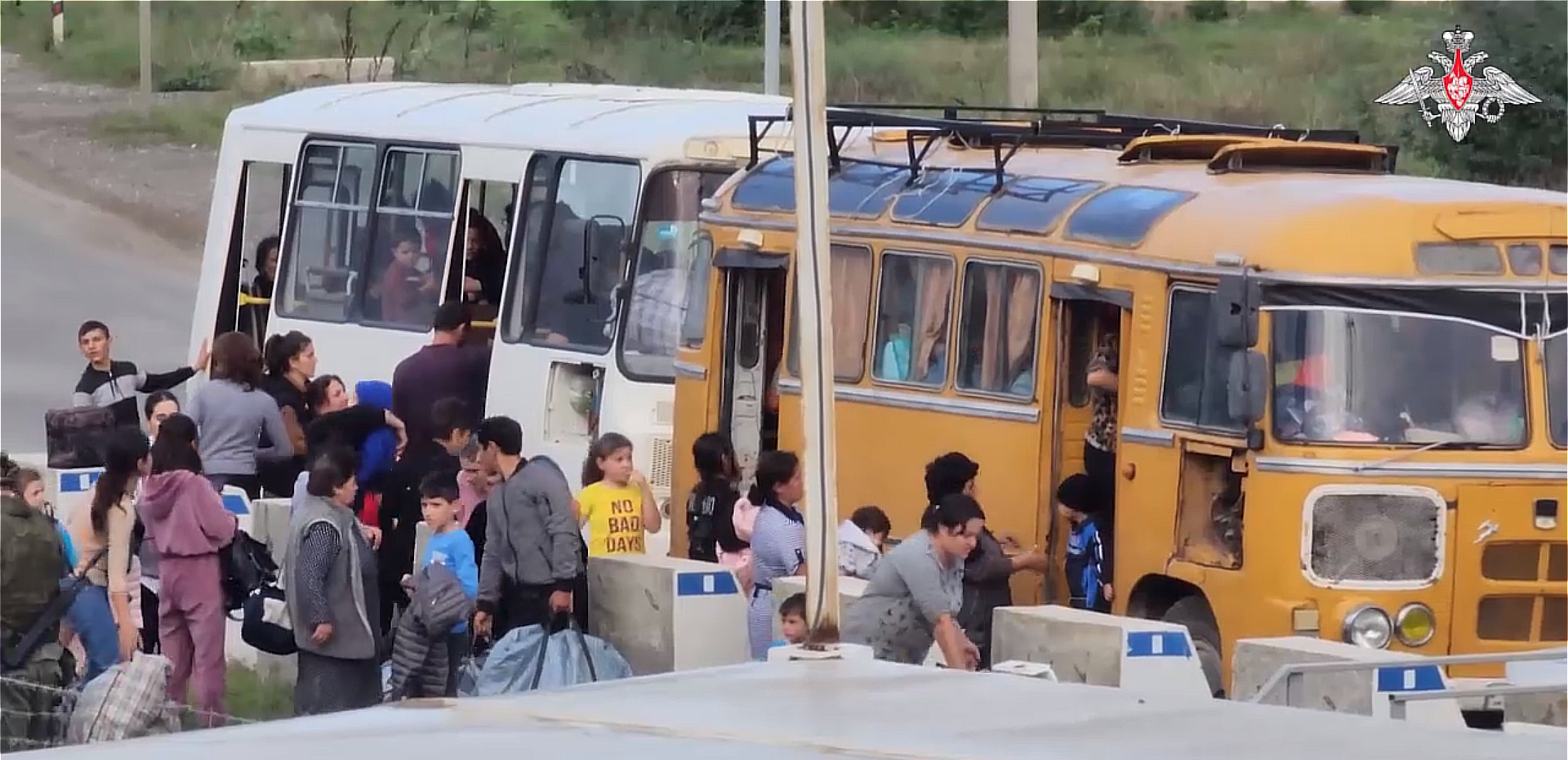
Russian peacekeepers help evacuate Armenian refugees from Stepanakert.

On 19 September 2023, Azerbaijan launched a military offensive into Artsakh-controlled territory. The following day, the government of the Republic of Artsakh agreed to disarm and a ceasefire took effect. Initial negotiations between representatives of the Karabakh Armenian community and the Government of Azerbaijan took place on 21 September in Yevlakh to discuss security, rights and "integration". The talks, which lasted two hours, ended without a formal agreement; however, a statement by Azerbaijani Presidency said that they were "constructive and positive" and that further negotiations would continue. On 24 September, a mass evacuation of ethnic-Armenian civilians started, fearing persecution and ethnic cleansing if they remained. A second round of negotiations between representatives of Nagorno-Karabakh Armenians and Azerbaijan took place in Khojaly on 25 September, where humanitarian issues were discussed. A third meeting between took place in Yevlakh on 29 September.

On 28 September, Artsakh president Samvel Shahramanyan signed a decree stating that all state institutions would be dissolved by 1 January 2024, bringing the existence of the republic to an end. Azerbaijani President Ilham Aliyev visited the region on 15 October, and officially raised the flag of Azerbaijan at the building that was previously used as the Artsakh Presidential Palace. On 22 December 2023, Shahramanyan said that there was no official document stipulating the dissolution of government institutions, and his office stated that it was "empty paper".

== Geography ==
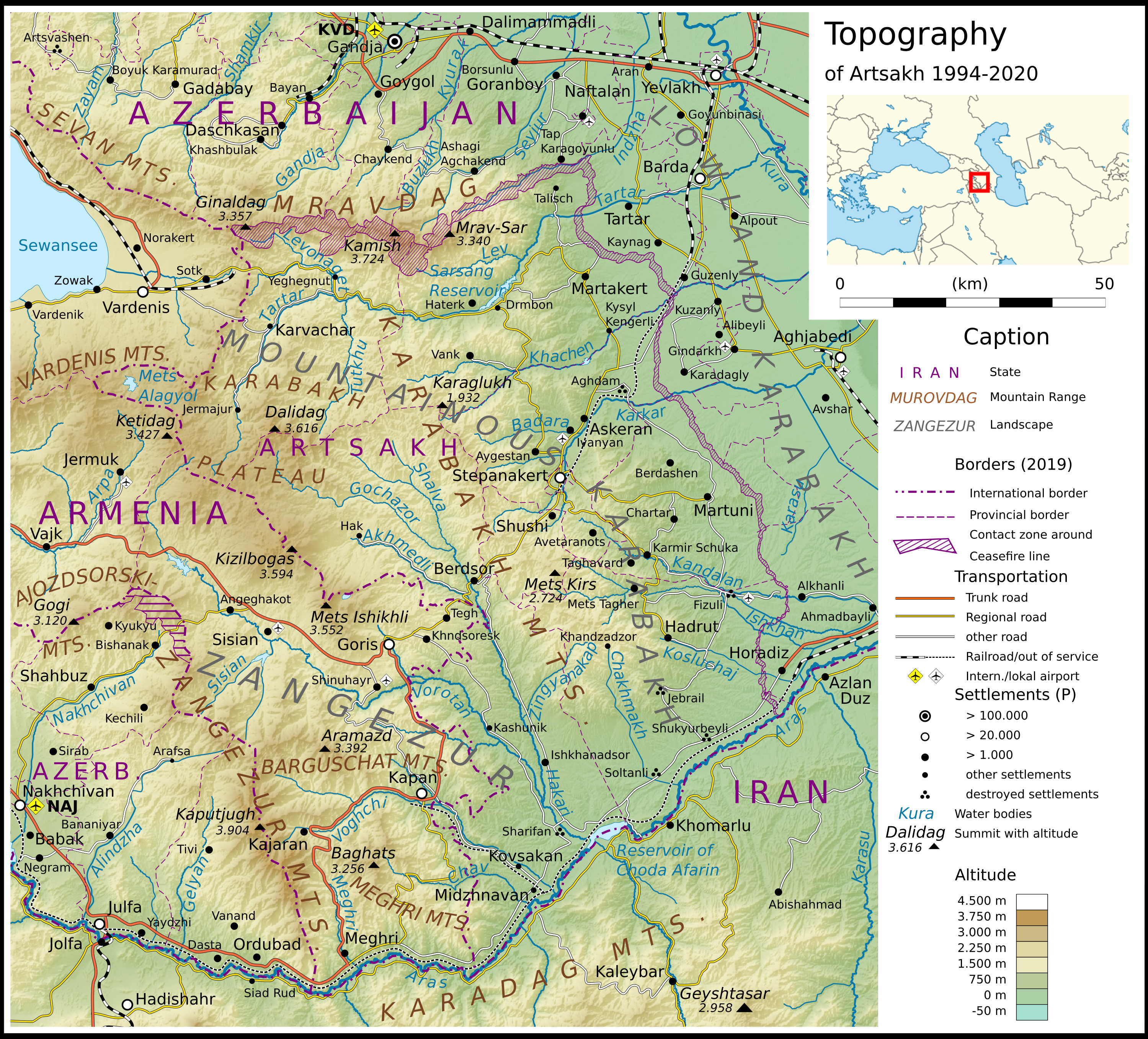
Topographic map of Artsakh in the borders 1994−2020

The Artsakh Republic was mountainous, a feature which has given it its former name (from the Russian for "Mountainous/Highland Karabakh"). It is 3,170 km^{2} (1,220 sq mi) in area. The largest water body is the Sarsang Reservoir, and the major rivers are the Tartar and Khachen rivers. The country is on a plateau which slopes downwards towards the east and southeast, with the average altitude being 1,100 m (3,600 ft) above sea level. Most rivers in the country flow towards the Artsakh Valley.

=== Geology ===
The geology of Artsakh is primarily part of the Kussary-Divichi Foredeep – the northern foredeep of the Greater Caucasus. The trough is filled with Oligocene to Quaternary age deepwater, molasse, and marine sedimentary rocks.

=== Climate ===
The climate is mild and temperate. The average temperature is 11 °C (52 °F), which fluctuates annually between 22 °C (72 °F) in July and −1 °C (30 °F) in January. The average precipitation can reach 710 mm (28 in) in some regions, and it is foggy for over 100 days a year.

=== Flora ===
Over 2,000 plant species exist in Artsakh, and more than 36% of the country is forested. The flora on the steppes consists mostly of semi-desert vegetation, while subalpine zone, and alpine tundra ecosystems can be found above the forest in the highlands and mountains.

== Government and politics ==
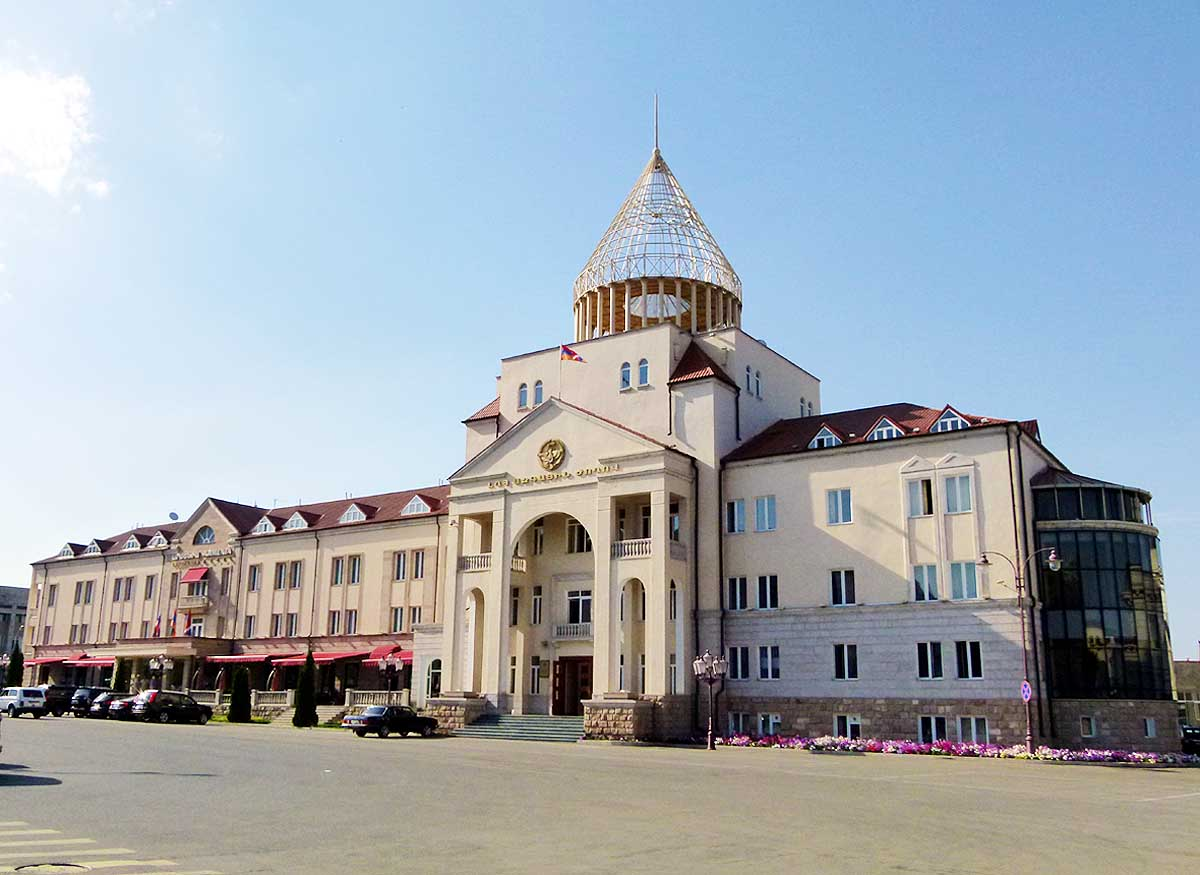
The National Assembly of Artsakh in Stepanakert

Artsakh was a unitary presidential democracy (transformed from a semi-presidential one, after the 2017 referendum). The Prime Minister's post was abolished and executive power resided with the President, who was both the head of state and head of government. The president was directly elected for a maximum of two-consecutive five-year terms. The last President was Samvel Shahramanyan.

The National Assembly was a unicameral legislature. It had 33 members who were elected for 5-year terms. Elections took place within a multi-party system; in 2009, the US NGO Freedom House ranked the Republic of Artsakh above the republics of Armenia and Azerbaijan with respect to civil and political rights. Five parties had members in the parliament: the Free Motherland party had 15 members, the Armenian Revolutionary Federation had 8 members, Democratic Party of Artsakh had 7 members, Movement 88 had 2 members and the National Revival party had one member. A number of non-partisan candidates had also taken part in the elections, with some success; in 2015, two of the 33 members to the National Assembly took their seats without running under the banner of any of the established political parties in the republic. Elections in Artsakh were not recognised by the European Union, the United States, and the Organisation of Islamic Cooperation, as well as numerous other countries, who called them a source of increased tensions.

Artsakh was heavily dependent on Armenia, and in many ways de facto functioned and was administered as part of Armenia. However, Armenia was hesitant to officially recognise Artsakh.

=== Constitution ===
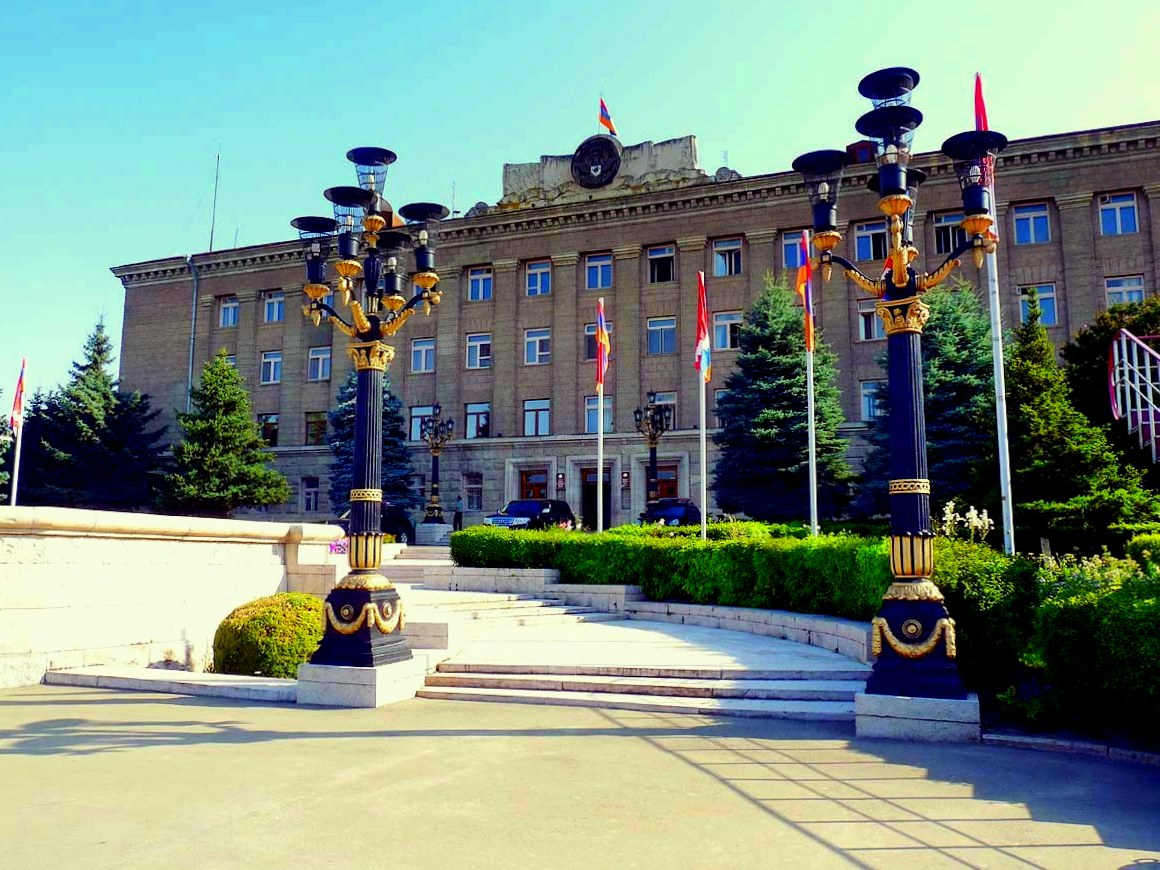
The Presidential Palace

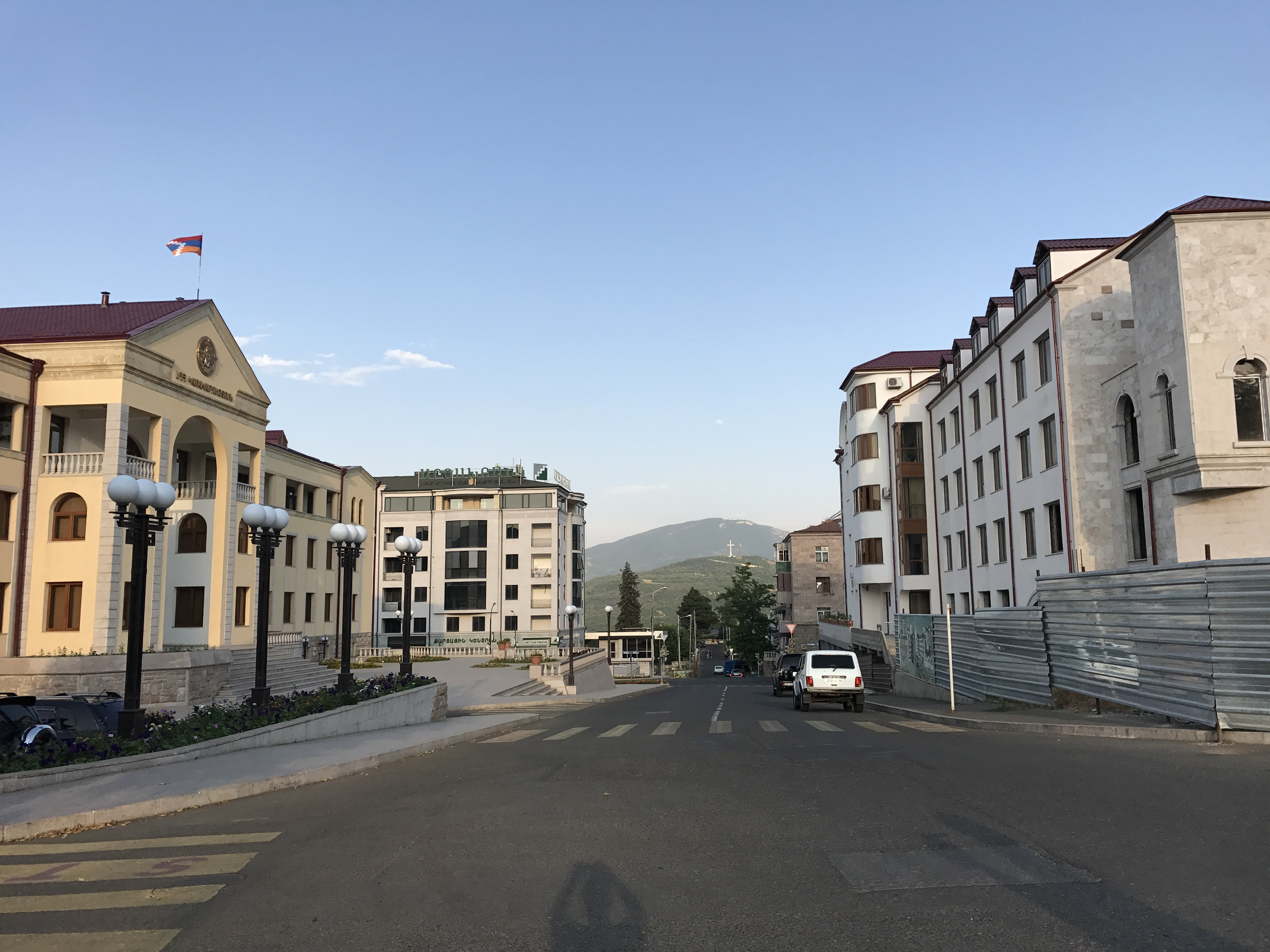
The government building

The founding documents of the Nagorno-Karabakh Republic were the Proclamation of the Nagorno Karabakh Republic and the Declaration of State Independence of the Nagorno Karabakh Republic. For a long time no constitution was created, with the republic instead declaring Armenian law applied on its territory through a 1992 law. Even when new laws were passed, they were often copies of equivalent Armenian laws.

On 3 November 2006, the then-president of the Nagorno-Karabakh Republic, Arkadi Ghukasyan, signed a decree to hold a referendum on a draft Nagorno-Karabakh constitution. It was held on 10 December of the same year and according to official preliminary results, with a turnout of 87.2%, as many as 98.6% of voters approved the constitution. The first article of the document described the Nagorno-Karabakh Republic, alternatively called the Republic of Artsakh, as "a sovereign, democratic state based on social justice and the rule of law." More than 100 non-governmental international observers and journalists who monitored the poll evaluated it positively, stating that it was held to a high international standard.

However, the vote was criticised harshly by the EU, OSCE, and GUAM, which rejected the referendum, deeming it illegitimate. The EU announced it was "aware that a 'constitutional referendum' has taken place," but emphasised its stance that only a negotiated settlement between Azerbaijan and ethnic Armenians could bring a lasting solution. Secretary General of the Council of Europe Terry Davis asserted that the poll "will not be recognized... and is therefore of no consequence".

In a statement, the OSCE chairman in office Karel De Gucht voiced his concern that the vote would prove harmful to the ongoing conflict settlement process, which, he said, had shown "visible progress" and was at a "promising juncture".

The holding of the referendum was also criticised by Turkey, which traditionally supports Azerbaijan because of common ethnic Turkic roots, and has historically had severe tensions with Armenia.

Another referendum was held on 20 February 2017, with an 87.6% vote in favour on a 76% turnout for instituting a new constitution. This constitution among other changes turned the government from a semi-presidential to a fully presidential model. Its name was changed from "Constitution of the Nagorno Karabakh Republic" to "Constitution of the Republic of Artsakh", though both remained official names of the country. The referendum was seen as a response to the 2016 Nagorno-Karabakh clashes.

=== Administrative divisions ===
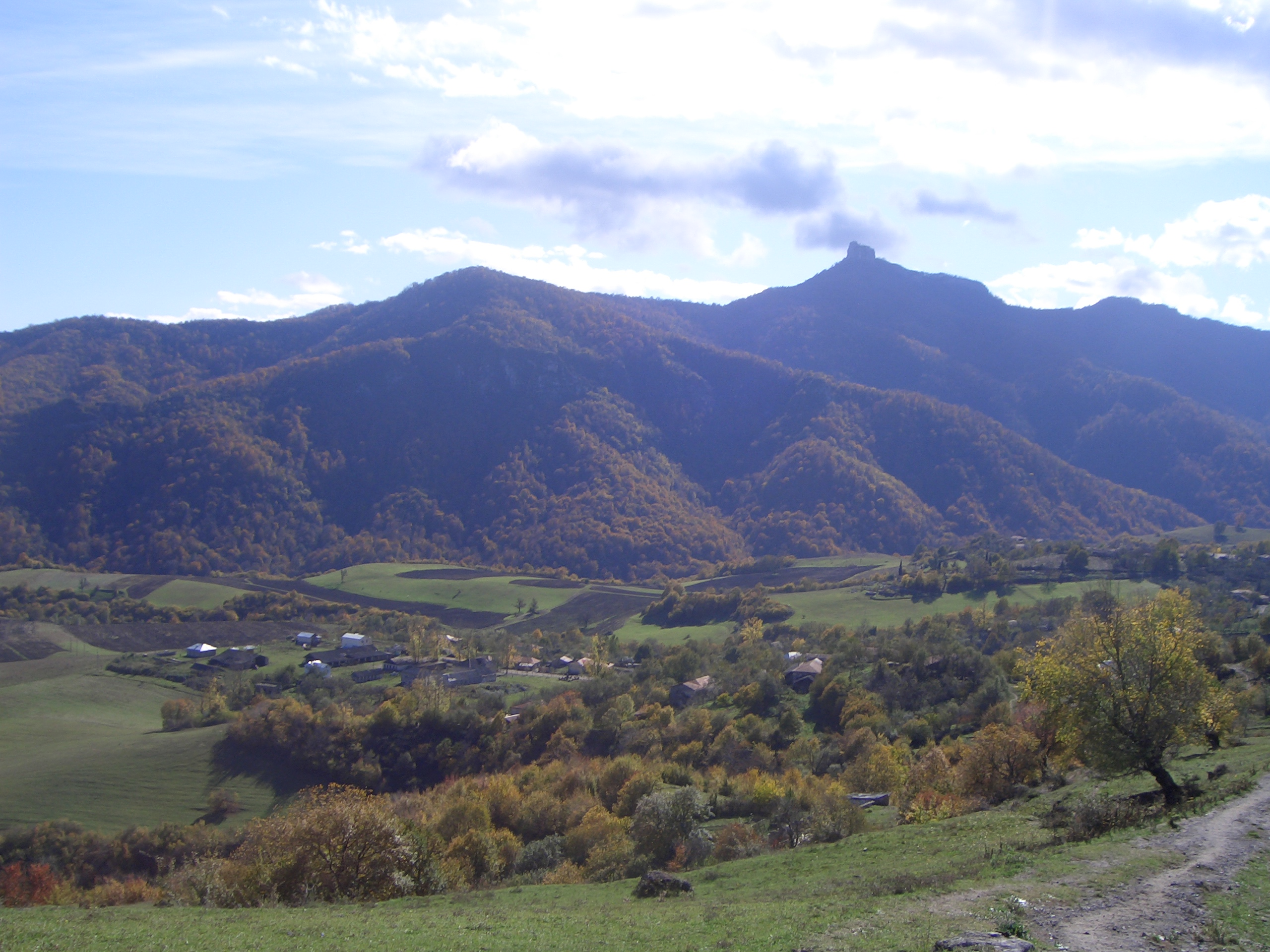
Mountain view in Martakert region

Artsakh was divided into seven provinces and one special administrative city. According to its authorities, it consisted of the territories in which the Nagorno-Karabakh Republic was proclaimed in 1991: the former Nagorno-Karabakh Autonomous Oblast (NKAO), the Shahumyan Region and the Getashen subdistrict; and those territories that formed part of the Republic of Artsakh before the Second Nagorno-Karabakh War. Also claimed by Artsakh was the Shahumyan Region of the Azerbaijan SSR, which has been under Azerbaijani control since the First Nagorno-Karabakh War. While the Shahumyan Region was not part of the NKAO, representatives from Shahumyan declared independence along with the Oblast, and the proclamation of Artsakh includes the Shahumyan region within its borders.

After the end of the Second Nagorno-Karabakh War, an agreement was signed according to which most of the controlled territories of the Republic of Artsakh were transferred to Azerbaijani control, but the Republic of Artsakh continues to claim these territories.

Following the Republic of Artsakh's declaration of independence, the Azerbaijani government abolished the NKAO and created Azerbaijani districts in its place. As a result, some of Artsakh's divisions corresponded with the Azerbaijani districts, while others had different borders.

Artsakh nominal administrative divisions

A comparative table of the established divisions of Artsakh and the corresponding districts of Azerbaijan follows:
#	Artsakh Province	Population (2005)	Capital	Former NKAO?	Equivalent Rayons of the Republic of Azerbaijan
1	Martakert Province	18,963	Martakert	Yes	Eastern part of Kalbajar, Western part of Tartar, part of Agdam
2	Askeran Province	16,979	Askeran	Yes	Khojali
3	Stepanakert (capital)	49,986	Stepanakert	Yes	Khankendi
4	Martuni Province	23,157	Martuni	Yes	Northern Khojavend
5	Shushi Province	4,324	Shushi	Yes	Shusha
6	Hadrut Province	12,005	Hadrut	Yes	Southern Khojavend
7	Shahumyan Province	2,560	Karvachar	No	Southern part of Goranboy, Western part of Kalbajar
8	Kashatagh Province	9,763	Berdzor	No	Lachin, Qubadli, Zangilan

=== Law enforcement ===
Law enforcement in Artsakh was inconsistent, as the region was a de facto independent republic and officially part of Azerbaijan. Law enforcement in Nagorno-Karabakh was the responsibility of the Interior Ministry and the NSS.

The Security Council (Armenian: Անվտանգության խորհուրդ, romanized: Anvtangut’yan khorhurd) was the highest decision-making defence and law enforcement body in the Republic of Artsakh.

The following served as secretaries of the council:

- Vitaly Balasanyan (November 2016 – November 2019)
- Samvel Babayan (29 May 2020 – 10 November 2020)
- Vitaly Balasanyan (December 2020 – 7 January 2023)
- Ararat Melkumyan (January 7–16, 2023)
- Samvel Shahramanyan (March 2023 - 10 September 2023)

==== Police of Artsakh ====
After the annexation of Artsakh to the Azerbaijan SSR, on 4 August 1923, the People's Commissariat for Internal Affairs of the NKAO was established. In the years following the First Nagorno-Karabakh War, the Republic of Artsakh created its own police force. In 2001, the National Assembly's law "On Police" was adopted on 30 November 2006. On 11 March 2014, Police Day in Artsakh was declared for 16 April. The police force followed an organisation similar to that of the Police of Armenia.

==== National Security Service ====
Artsakh had its own National Security Service, based on the NSS of Armenia. It was a republican body that elaborated and implemented the policies of the government in the national security sector. By decree of the NKR Supreme Council adopted on 18 January 2006, the NKAO State Security Department was named the State Department of National Security under the NKR Council of Ministers. By order of the NKR National Assembly on 26 November 2003, the NKR laws "On National Security Bodies" and "On Service in National Security Bodies" were adopted. The activities of the NSS were based in the decrees of 25 September 2012. The NSS was headed by Lieutenant General Kamo Aghajanyan.

=== Military ===
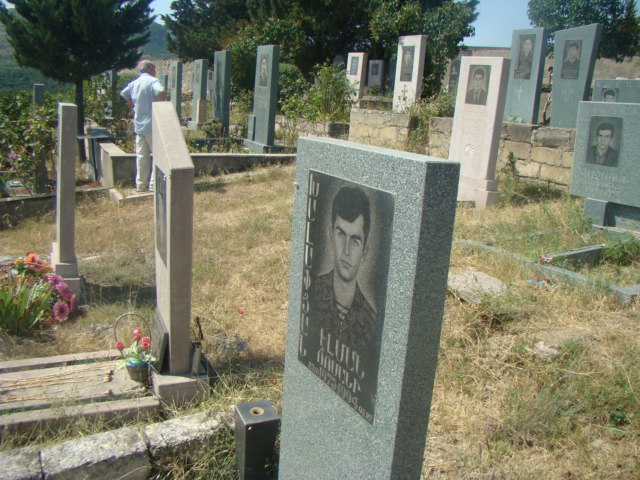
The graves of Armenian soldiers in Stepanakert.

According to the Constitution of Artsakh, the army was under the civilian command of the government. The Artsakh Defense Army was officially established on 9 May 1992 as a defence against Azerbaijan, but was subsequently disbanded on 21 September 2023 under the terms of Nagorno-Karabakh ceasefire agreement following the 2023 Azerbaijani military offensive.

It fought the Azerbaijani army to a ceasefire on 12 May 1994. At its peak, the Artsakh Defense Army consisted of around 18,000–20,000 officers and soldiers. However, only around 8,500 citizens from Artsakh served in the army; some 10,000 came from Armenia. There were also 177–316 tanks, 256–324 additional fighting vehicles, and 291–322 guns and mortars. Armenia supplied arms and other military necessities to Artsakh. Several battalions of Armenia's army were deployed directly in the Artsakh zone on occupied Azerbaijani territory.

The Artsakh Defense Army fought in Shusha in 1992, opening the Lachin corridor between Armenia and Nagorno-Karabakh (1992), and staged the defence of the Martakert front from 1992 to 1994.

=== Foreign relations ===
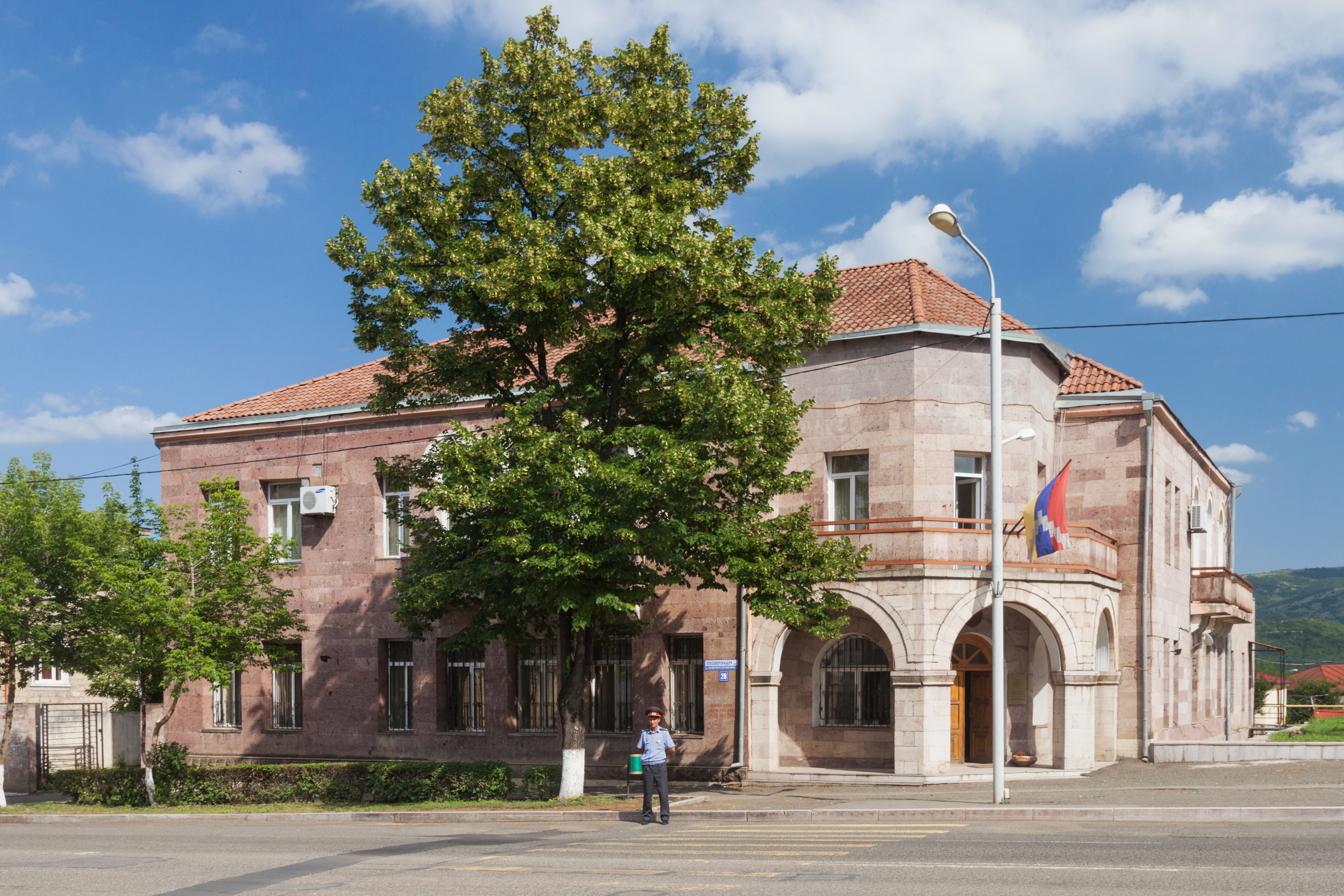
The Ministry of Foreign Affairs of Artsakh in Stepanakert

The Ministry of Foreign Affairs was based in Stepanakert. Since no UN member or observer ever recognised Artsakh, none of its foreign relations were of an official diplomatic nature. However, the Republic of Artsakh operated five permanent Missions and one Bureau of Social-Politic Information in France. Artsakh's Permanent Missions existed in Armenia, Australia, France, Germany, Russia, the United States, and one for Middle East countries based in Beirut. The goals of the offices were to present the Republic's positions on various issues, to provide information and to facilitate the peace process.

In his 2015 speech, the president of Armenia Serzh Sargsyan stated that he considered Nagorno-Karabakh "an inseparable part of Armenia".

The Republic of Artsakh was neither a member nor observer of the UN or any of its specialised agencies. However, it was a member of the Community for Democracy and Rights of Nations, commonly known as the "Commonwealth of Unrecognized States".

While no UN member states recognised Artsakh, some unrecognised and partially recognised states had done so, including Transnistria, Abkhazia, and South Ossetia. Various sub-national governments, including several U.S. states, had issued calls for recognition of Artsakh by their national governments.

== De facto independent Artsakh (1993–2023): conflicting ideologies and diplomacy ==
=== Artsakh–Armenia relations ===
Artsakh was a de facto independent state, calling itself the Republic of Artsakh. It had close relations with Armenia and used the same currency, the dram. According to Human Rights Watch, "from the beginning of the Karabakh conflict, Armenia provided aid, weapons, and volunteers. Armenian involvement in Artsakh escalated after a December 1993 Azerbaijani offensive. The Republic of Armenia began sending conscripts and regular Army and Interior Ministry troops to fight in Artsakh." The politics of Armenia and the de facto Artsakh are so intertwined that Robert Kocharyan served as the first President of the Nagorno-Karabakh Republic, from 1994 to 1997, then as prime minister of Armenia from 1997 to 1998, and then as the second President of Armenia, from 1998 to 2008.

However, Armenian governments have repeatedly resisted internal pressure to unite the two, due to ongoing negotiations under the auspices of the OSCE Minsk Group. In his case study of Eurasia, Dov Lynch of the Institute for Security Studies of WEU believes that "Karabakh's independence allows the new Armenian state to avoid the international stigma of aggression, despite the fact that Armenian troops fought in the war between 1991 and 1994 and continue to man the Line of Contact between Karabakh and Azerbaijan." Lynch also cites that the "strength of the Armenian armed forces, and Armenia's strategic alliance with Russia, are seen as key shields protecting the Karabakh state by the authorities in Stepanakert". Some sources consider Artsakh as functioning de facto as a part of Armenia.

=== Negotiations, outside mediation (2001–2007) ===
==== 2001 Paris, Key West talks ====
Representatives of Armenia, Azerbaijan, France, Russia and the United States met in Paris and Key West, in early 2001. Despite rumours that the parties were close to a solution, the Azerbaijani authorities – both during Heydar Aliyev's period of office, and after the accession of his son Ilham Aliyev in the October 2003 elections – have firmly denied that any agreement was reached in Paris or Key West.

==== 2004 Astana talks ====
Further talks between the Azerbaijani and Armenian presidents, Ilham Aliyev and Robert Kocharyan, were held in September 2004 in Astana, Kazakhstan, on the sidelines of the Commonwealth of Independent States (CIS) summit. Reportedly, one of the suggestions put forward was the withdrawal of the occupying forces from the Azeri territories adjacent to Artsakh and then holding referendums (plebiscites) in Artsakh and Azerbaijan proper regarding the future status of the region.

==== 2006 Rambouillet talks ====
On 10 and 11 February 2006, Kocharyan and Aliyev met in Rambouillet, France, to discuss the fundamental principles of a settlement to the conflict. Contrary to the initial optimism, the Rambouillet talks did not produce any agreement, with key issues such as the status of Artsakh and whether Armenian troops would withdraw from Kalbajar still being contentious.

==== 2006 Bucharest meeting ====
Talks were held at the Polish embassy in Bucharest in June 2006. Again, US, Russian, and French diplomats attended the talks that lasted over 40 minutes. Earlier, Armenian President Kocharyan announced that he was ready to "continue dialogue with Azerbaijan for the settlement of the Nagorno-Karabakh conflict and with Turkey on establishing relations without any preconditions".

According to the Armenian foreign minister in 2006, Vardan Oskanyan, no progress was made at this latest meeting. Both presidents failed to reach a consensus on the issues from the earlier Rambouillet conference. He noted that the Kocharyan-Aliyev meeting was held in a normal atmosphere. "Nevertheless," he added, "the foreign ministers of the two countries are commissioned to continue talks over the settlement of the Nagorno-Karabakh conflict and try to find common points before the next meeting of the presidents."

The major disagreement between both sides at the Bucharest conference was the status of Artsakh. Azerbaijan's preferred solution would be to give Artsakh the "highest status of autonomy adopted in the world". Armenia, on the other hand, endorsed a popular vote by the inhabitants of Artsakh to decide their future, a position that was also taken by the international mediators. On 27 June, the Armenian foreign minister said both parties agreed to allow the residents of Artsakh to vote regarding the future status of the region. The Azerbaijani Ministry of Foreign Affairs officially refuted that statement. According to Azeri opposition leader Isa Gambar, Azerbaijan did indeed agree to the referendum, but his claim was never substantiated.

==== 2006 Prague Process ====
The "Prague Process" overseen by the OSCE Minsk Group was brought into sharp relief in the summer of 2006 with a series of rare public revelations seemingly designed to jump-start the stalled negotiations. After the release in June of a paper outlining its position, which had until then been carefully guarded, U.S. State Department official Matthew Bryza told Radio Free Europe that the Minsk Group favoured a referendum in Karabakh that would determine its final status. The referendum, in the view of the OSCE, should take place not in Azerbaijan as a whole, but in Artsakh only. This was a blow to Azerbaijan, and despite talk that their government might eventually seek a more sympathetic forum for future negotiations, this did not occur.

==== 2007 Azerbaijan's PKK claim ====
On 10 December 2007 Azerbaijan's deputy foreign minister said Azerbaijan would be prepared to conduct anti-terrorist operations in Nagorno-Karabakh against alleged bases of the Kurdistan Workers' Party (PKK). Armenian Foreign Ministry Spokesperson Vladimir Karapetian previously rejected the allegations as "fabricated" and suggested the accusations of the PKK presence were a form of provocation.

=== Armenian, Artsakh fundamental positions (c. 2007–2010) ===
Armenia did not recognise Azerbaijani claims to Nagorno-Karabakh and believed the territory should have self-determination. Both the Armenian and Artsakhi governments emphasised that the independence of Artsakh was declared around the time the Soviet Union dissolved and its members became independent. The Armenian government insisted that the government of Artsakh be part of any discussions on the region's future, and rejected ceding occupied territory or allowing refugees to return before talks on the region's status.

In 2009, the president of the Nagorno-Karabakh Republic Bako Sahakyan declared that "Artsakh will never be a part of Azerbaijan. Artsakh security should never be an article of commerce either. As to other issues, we are ready to discuss them with Azerbaijan". In 2010 president of Republic of Armenia Serzh Sargsyan in his speech in the Chatham House of the British Royal Institute of International Affairs declared that "Karabakh was never a part of independent Azerbaijan: it was annexed to Azerbaijan by a decision of the Soviet Union party body. The people of Karabakh never put up with this decision, and upon the first opportunity, seceded from the Soviet Union fully in line with the laws of the Soviet Union and the applicable international law".

=== Aliyev: fundamental position on Armenia, Nagorno-Karabakh (2008) ===
In 2008, Azerbaijani president Ilham Aliyev stated that "Nagorno-Karabakh will never be independent; the position is backed by international mediators as well; Armenia has to accept the reality" and that "in 1918, Yerevan was granted to the Armenians. It was a great mistake. The khanate of Iravan was Azeri territory, the Armenians were guests here".

=== UN, EU, Minsk Group diplomacy (2008–2010) ===
On 14 March 2008, the United Nations General Assembly passed a non-binding resolution by a vote of 39 to 7, with 100 abstentions, reaffirming Azerbaijan's territorial integrity, expressing support for that country's internationally recognised borders and demanding the immediate withdrawal of all Armenian forces from all occupied territories there. The resolution was supported mainly by members of the Organisation of Islamic Cooperation (OIC) and GUAM. Azerbaijan is a member of both groups, which include other nations facing breakaway regions. The resolution was opposed by all three members of the OSCE Minsk Group.

On 20 May 2010, the European Parliament adopted a resolution "on the need for an EU strategy for the South Caucasus", which states that the EU must pursue a strategy to promote stability, prosperity and conflict resolution in the South Caucasus. The resolution "calls on the parties to intensify their peace talk efforts for the purpose of a settlement in the coming months, to show a more constructive attitude and to abandon preferences to perpetuate the status quo created by force and with no international legitimacy, creating in this way instability and prolonging the suffering of the war-affected populations; condemns the idea of a military solution and the heavy consequences of military force already used, and calls on both parties to avoid any further breaches of the 1994 ceasefire". The resolution also calls for the withdrawal of Armenian forces from all occupied territories of Azerbaijan, accompanied by the deployment of international forces to be organised with respect of the UN Charter in order to provide the necessary security guarantees in a period of transition, which will ensure the security of the population of Artsakh and allow the displaced people to return to their homes and further conflicts caused by homelessness to be prevented; and states that the EU believes that the position according to which Artsakh includes all occupied Azerbaijani lands surrounding Artsakh should rapidly be abandoned. It also notes "that an interim status for Nagorno-Karabakh could offer a solution until the final status is determined and that it could create a transitional framework for peaceful coexistence and cooperation of Armenian and Azerbaijani populations in the region."

On 26 June 2010, the presidents of the OSCE Minsk Group's co-chair countries, France, Russia, and United States made a joint statement, reaffirming their "commitment to support the leaders of Armenia and Azerbaijan as they finalize the Basic Principles for the peaceful settlement of the Nagorno-Karabakh conflict".

=== Armenian position (2019) ===
During his August 2019 visit to Stepanakert, the Prime Minister of Armenia Nikol Pashinyan presented the strategic development goals set for Armenia for the next three decades. He added that he made no special provision for Nagorno-Karabakh because "Artsakh is Armenia and there is no alternative". Soon afterwards, Armenia's Foreign Minister Zohrab Mnatsakanyan commented on Pashinyan's statement by saying he had "nothing to add" to Pashinyan's formulation of Armenia's position in the conflict.

== Displacement, landmines problem during conflict (1988–2023) ==
=== Displaced people ===
==== Azeri and other non-Armenian refugees ====
The first Nagorno-Karabakh conflict resulted in the displacement of 597,000 Azerbaijanis (this figure includes 230,000 children born to internally displaced people (IDPs) and 54,000 who had returned) including Artsakh, and 220,000 Azeris, 18,000 Kurds and 3,500 Russians fled from Armenia to Azerbaijan from 1988 to 1989. The Azerbaijani government estimated that 63% of IDPs lived below the poverty line, compared to 49% of the total population. About 154,000 lived in the capital, Baku. According to the International Organization for Migration, 40,000 IDPs lived in camps, 60,000 in dugout shelters, and 20,000 in railway cars. Forty-thousand IDPs lived in EU-funded settlements and UNHCR provided housing for another 40,000. Another 5,000 IDPs lived in abandoned or rapidly deteriorating schools. Others lived in trains, on roadsides in half-constructed buildings, or in public buildings such as tourist and health facilities. Tens of thousands lived in seven tent camps where poor water supply and sanitation caused gastrointestinal infections, tuberculosis, and malaria.

The government required IDPs to register their place of residence in an attempt to better target the limited and largely inadequate national and international assistance due to the Armenian advocated and US imposed restrictions on humanitarian aid to Azerbaijan. Many IDPs were from rural areas and found it difficult to integrate into the urban labour market. Many international humanitarian agencies reduced or ceased assistance for IDPs citing increasing oil revenues of the country. The infant mortality among displaced Azerbaijani children was 3–4 times higher than in the rest of the population. The rate of stillbirth was 88.2 per 1,000 births among the internally displaced people. As of 2003, the majority of the displaced had lived in difficult conditions for more than 13 years.

During the 2020 war President Aliyev stated he intended for refugees to return to the area. While many former cities are currently uninhabitable, the Azerbaijani government and some Azerbaijani companies have announced plans to rebuild infrastructure and invest in the newly controlled territories. The Azerbaijani military is clearing mines prior to resettlement, which may take 10–13 years.

==== Armenian refugees ====
280,000 people – virtually all ethnic Armenians who fled Azerbaijan during the 1988–1993 war over the disputed region of Artsakh – were living in refugee-like circumstances in Armenia. Some left the country, principally to Russia. Their children born in Armenia acquire citizenship automatically. Their numbers are thus subject to constant decline due to departure, and de-registration required for naturalisation. Of these, about 250,000 fled Azerbaijan (areas outside Nagorno-Karabakh); approximately 30,000 came from Nagorno-Karabakh. All were registered with the government as refugees at year's end.

=== Land mines ===
Mines were laid in the region from 1991 to 1994 by both conflicting parties in the first Nagorno-Karabakh War. In 2005, the United Nations Development Program (UNDP) claimed that 123 people had been killed and over 300 injured by landmines near Nagorno-Karabakh since the 1994 truce.

HALO Trust, a UK-based demining NGO, was the only international organisation conducting demining in Nagorno-Karabakh. They destroyed 180,858 small arms ammunition, 48,572 units of "other explosive items", 12,423 cluster bombs, 8,733 anti-personnel landmines, and 2,584 anti-tank landmines between 2000 and 2016. By 2018, they had cleared 88% of the territory's minefields, with a target to clear the rest by 2020. The main cities of Stepanakert and Shusha, as well as the main north–south highway, had been cleared and were safe for travel. The demining effort had been largely funded by the United States Agency for International Development (USAID).

== Economy ==
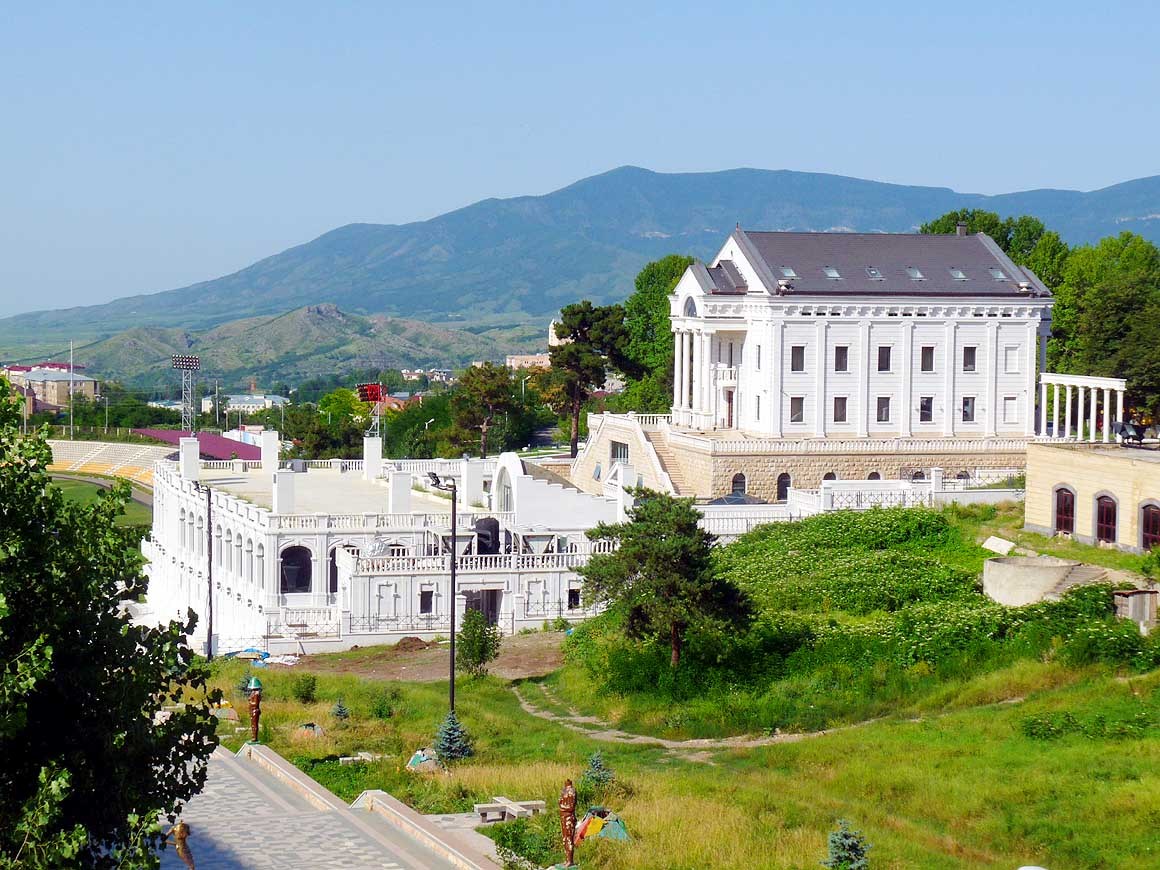
A hotel in downtown Stepanakert

The socio-economic situation of the Republic of Artsakh was greatly affected by the 1991–1994 conflict. Yet, foreign investments began to come. The origin of most venture capital comes from Armenians in Armenia, Russia, United States, France, Australia, Iran, and the Middle East.

Notably the telecommunications sector was developed with Karabakh Telecom investing millions of dollars in mobile telephony, spearheaded by a Lebanese company. Karabakh Telecom was disconnected from external communication on 27 September 2023, calls and internet traffic to the Nagorno-Karabakh region are carried out from then on only through telecom operators and providers of Azerbaijan.

Copper and gold mining has been advancing since 2002 with development and launch of operations at Drmbon deposit. Approximately 27–28 thousand tons (wet weight) of concentrates are produced with average copper content of 19–21% and gold content of 32–34 g/t. Azerbaijan considers any mining operations in Nagorno-Karabakh illegal and has vowed to engage an international audit company to determine the damages suffered by Azerbaijan's state-run ore management company as a result. In 2018, the government of Azerbaijan announced that it was planning to appeal to an international court and the law enforcement agencies of the countries where the mining companies involved are registered.

The banking system was administered by Artsakhbank (a Yerevan-based Armenian bank fulfilling the functions of the state bank of Nagorno-Karabakh) and a number of other Armenian banks. The republic used the Armenian dram.

Wine growing and processing of agricultural products, particularly wine (i.e., storage of wine, wine stuffs, cognac alcohol) was one of the prioritised directions of the economic development.

=== Tourism ===
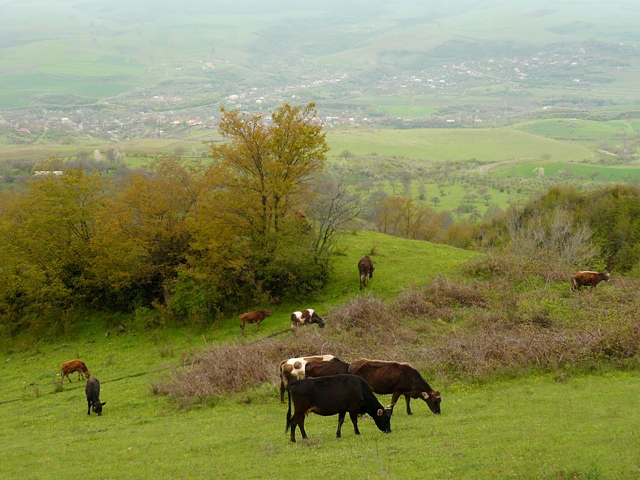
Karmir Shuka

The republic developed a tourist industry geared to Armenia and the Armenian diaspora. The republic showed a major increase in tourists over the last several years of its existence because of Artsakh's many cultural sights. Before the 2020 war there were nine hotels in Stepanakert. The Artsakh development agency said 4,000 tourists visited Artsakh in 2005. The figures rose to 8,000 in 2010 (excluding visitors from Armenia). The agency cooperated with the Armenia Tourism Development Agency (ATDA) as Armenia is the only way tourists (mainly Armenians) could access Artsakh. The Ministry of Foreign Affairs of Artsakh reported continuous expansion of visitors' geography. Tourist infrastructure was developed around sites such as monasteries that showcase the Armenian history in the region, with Islamic sites rarely restored, while some ghost cities and areas near the front line were off limit to tourists.

The Tourism Development Agency of Artsakh was established in Yerevan as a non-governmental organisation in the Republic of Armenia to promote tourism further in Artsakh. It made preparations for tour operators, travel agencies and journalists covering the region, and arranges for hotel services, shopping, catering, and recreation centres.

Tourist attractions included:

- Gandzasar monastery, main tourist attraction.
- Ghazanchetsots Cathedral of the Holy Savior (Under Azerbaijani control since 2020 war)
- Church of the Holy Mother of God "Kanach Zham" (Under Azerbaijani control since 2020 war)
- Amaras Monastery
- Tsitsernavank Monastery (Under Azerbaijani control since 2020 war)
- St. Yeghishe Arakyal Monastery
- Dadivank Monastery
- Gtichavank monastery (Under Azerbaijani control since 2020 war)
- Bri Yeghtsi monastery
- Yerits Mankants
- Katarovank Monastery (Under Azerbaijani control since 2020 war)

Other tourist attractions included:

- Fort Mayraberd (10th–18th centuries) served as the primary bulwark against Turko-nomadic incursions from the eastern steppe. The fort is found to the east of the region's capital city of Stepanakert.
- Govharagha Mosque (18th century), a mosque located in the city of Shusha, now under Azerbaijani control.

Janapar Trail is a marked trail, through mountains, valleys, and villages of Artsakh, with monasteries and fortresses along the way. It is not hikable since the Second Nagorno-Karabakh War. The trail was broken into day hikes, which brought tourists to a different village each night. The paths have existed for centuries but now are marked specifically for hikers. The Himnakan Janapar (backbone trail), marked in 2007, leads from the northwest region of Shahumian to the southern town of Hadrut, now under Azerbaijani control. Side trails and mini trails take one to additional parts of Artsakh. The important sites passed along this hike include Dadivank Monastery, Gandzasar monastery, Shusha, the Karkar Canyon with its high cliffs, Zontik Waterfall, and the ruins of Hunot and Gtichavank monastery.

One of the noteworthy side trails is the Gtichavank Loop Trail. This loop starts from Tugh Village, now under Azerbaijani control.

However, those who travelled to Artsakh without the Azerbaijani government's prior consent and permission were denied entry to Azerbaijan since the country considered Artsakh their territory unlawfully occupied by the Armenian army. The Azerbaijani government also kept and published online a list of foreign nationals who visited these occupied areas without prior approval. In late 2017, the list contained 699 names with additional details (date, country, profession, purpose of visit). The earliest entry recorded a visit to Artsakh that occurred on an unspecified date sometime between 1993 and 1996. The list included many journalists and members of parliaments of foreign countries.

==== Artsakh Wine Fest ====
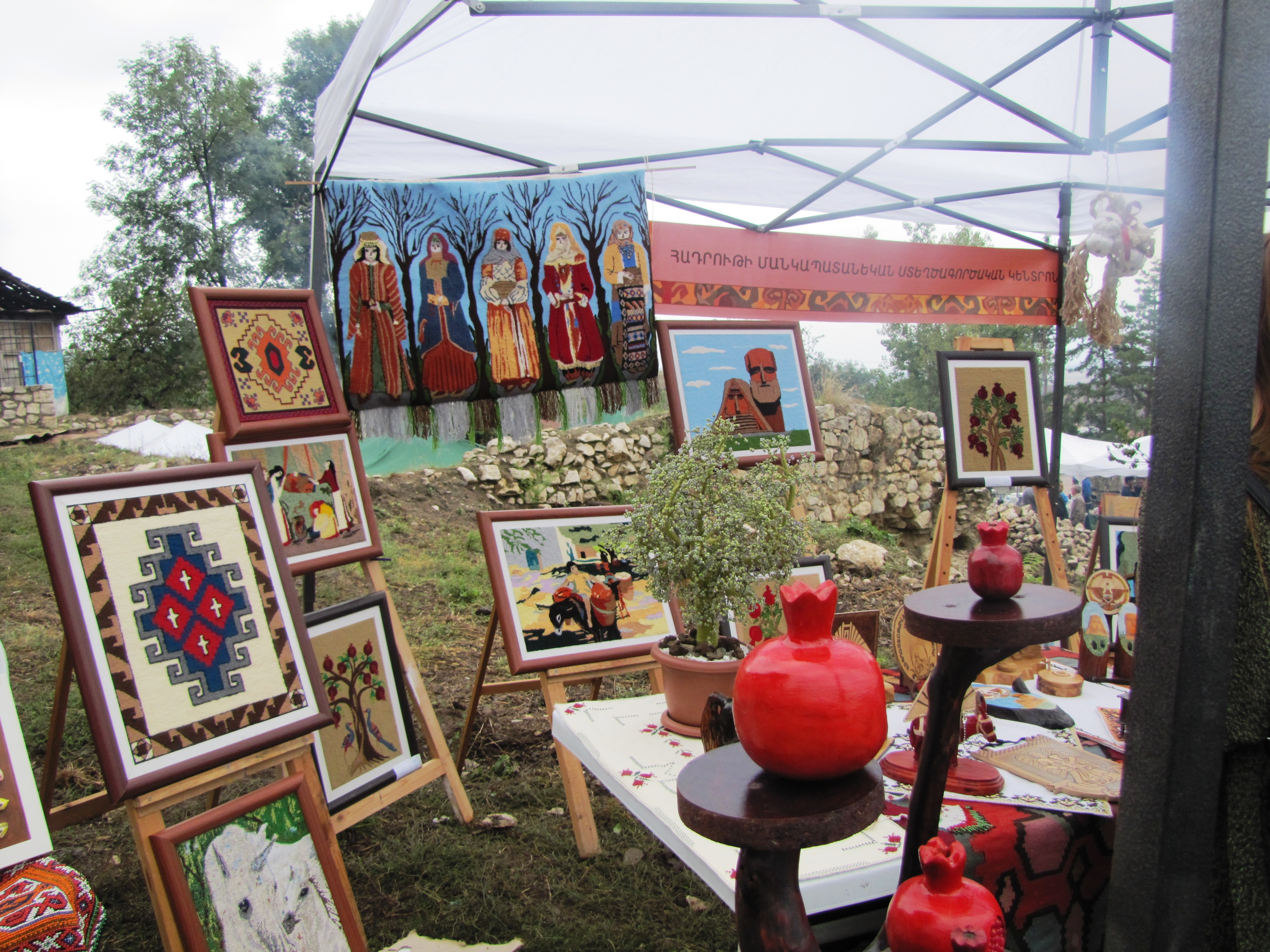
Exhibition of artworks at Artsakh Wine Fest

Before the 2020 war, the Artsakh Wine Fest took place annually in Togh since 2014. The festival was held on the third Saturday of each September.

The festival was initiated by the Department of Tourism and Protection of Historical Places of the Ministry of Culture, Tourism and Youth Affairs of the Republic of Artsakh and was aimed to develop tourism in Artsakh. It was meant to restore Artsakh winemaking traditions. The festival provided a platform to the winemakers of Artsakh and Armenia giving them an opportunity to sell their products, exchange knowledge, promote their wine etc. The annual festival's program included grape stomping, tasting of traditional Artsakh cuisine, an exhibition of artworks, an exhibition of ancient artefacts that belonged to the Melik Yegan's Palace, as well as an exhibition and sale of local wine, where one could find products from 5 different regions of Artsakh and Armenia. Traditionally, the festival was accompanied by Armenian national singing and dancing. The festival evolved into a national holiday.

=== Transportation ===
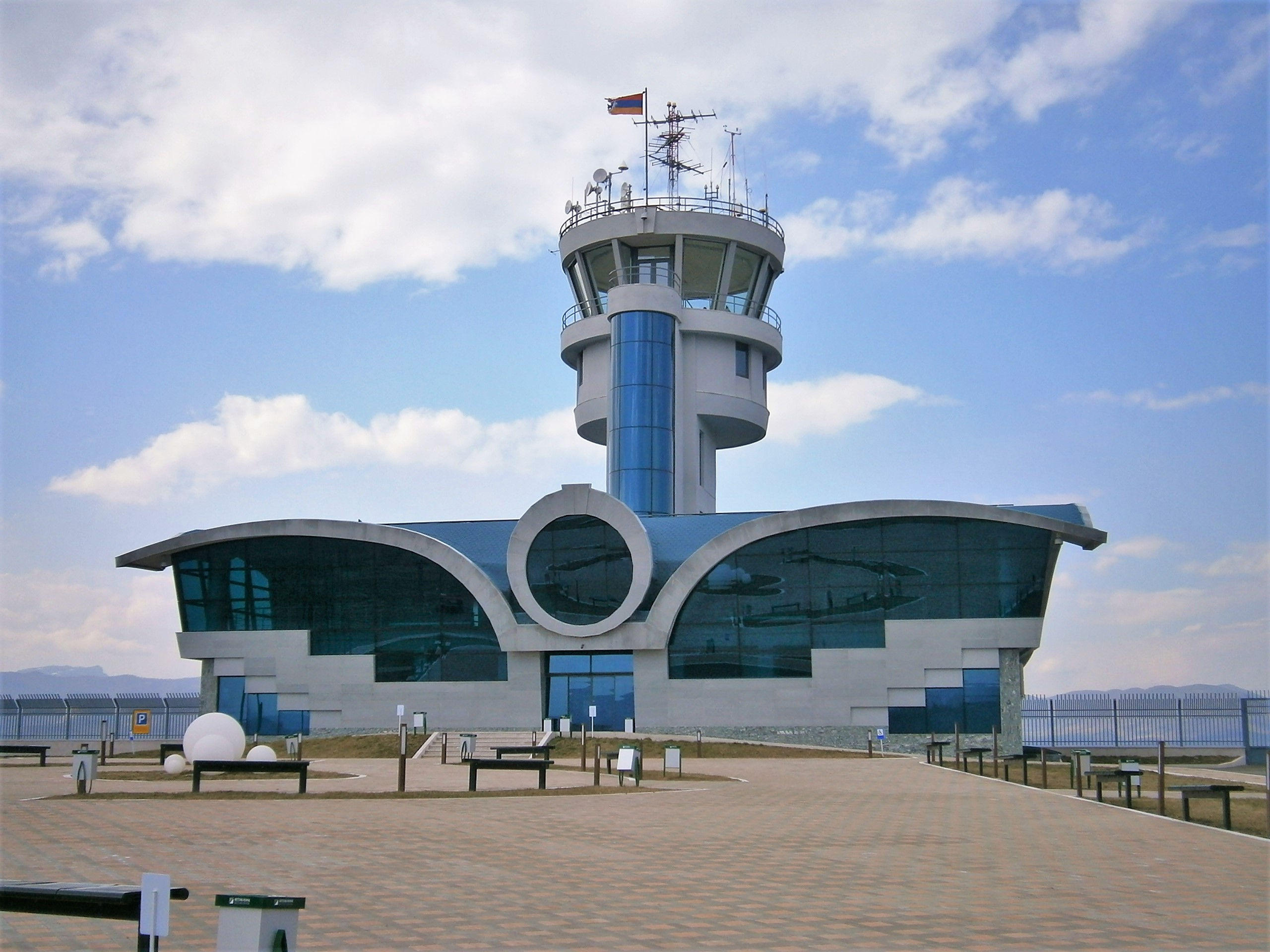
Stepanakert Airport

The transportation system had been damaged by the 1991–1994 conflict. The North–South Artsakh motorway alone largely facilitated the development of the transportation system. Before the 2020 war, the 169 km (105 mi) Hadrut-Stepanakert-Askeran-Martakert motorway was the lifeline of Artsakh, and US$25 million donated during the Hayastan All-Armenian Foundation telethons was allotted for the construction of the road. A new route from the Armenian capital Yerevan to Stepanakert was planned to bypass the 8–9 hours drive via the Lachin corridor. It was opened in September 2017. A third road was planned in 2019.

Authorities in the USSR opened a railway line in the NKAO in 1944. It connected the capital, Stepanakert, and Yevlax in Azerbaijan. It was built to Russian gauge of 1520mm. Due to the first Nagorno-Karabakh War, the line the railway was badly damaged and the line was closed.

Stepanakert Airport, the sole civilian airport of the Republic of Artsakh, located about 8 kilometres (5 miles) east of the capital, has been closed since the onset of the war in 1990. It was expected that the airport would have regular flight services only to Yerevan, Armenia, with state-owned carrier Artsakh Air, but no flights had ever started.

=== Communications ===
Karabakh Telecom (KT), the only telecommunications company in Artsakh, was started on 1 February 2002 by the Lebanese-Armenian businessman and Chairman Pierre Fattouch. In 2019, Fattouch was charged with tax evasion in Lebanon and in July 2019 a Lebanese Prosecutor General ordered a closure of quarries owned by Fattouch for failure to acquire a legal license. On 10 December 2020, the Organized Crime and Corruption Reporting Project (OCCRP) investigated the offshore firm Crossbridge Capital, which manages billions in shareholder assets, including those of Pierre Fattouch. KT was also run by the General Director Ralf Yerikian, a Lebanese-born businessman of Armenian origin. The company was considered a CJSC, a closed joint stock company, in which shares of company stock can be bought or sold by shareholders. The company had US$9.9 million in revenue in the 4th quarter of 2019. From Q1 of 2020 until Q2 of 2021, it shared the same amount in revenue for every quarter – US$11.1 million. The company has not publicly disclosed their accurate financials between 2020 and 2021. It has invested over US$12 millions in mobile telecommunication projects throughout Artsakh.

== Demographics ==
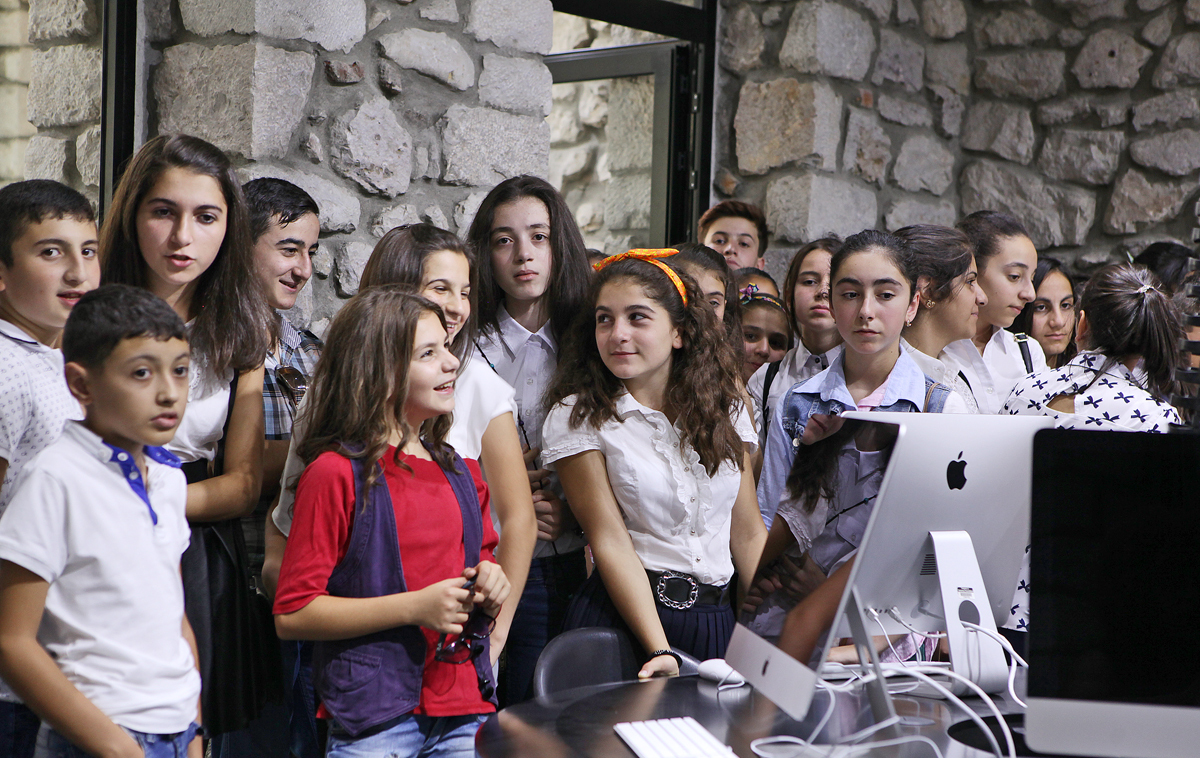
Children at Tumo Center Artsakh branch

In September 2023, over half of Artsakh's ethnic Armenian population fled the country. According to Armenian Prime Minister Nikol Pashinyan, 100,417 people arrived in Armenia from Artsakh. In 2015, the country's population was 145,000, made up of 99.7% Armenians. This composition represents a sharp change from the 1979 and 1989 census, when the Azerbaijani population was 23 and 21.5 per cent, respectively. The annual birth rate was recorded at 2,200–2,300 per year, an increase from nearly 1,500 in 1999.

OSCE report, released in March 2011, estimates the population of the "seven occupied territories surrounding Nagorno-Karabakh" to be 14,000, and states "there has been no significant growth in the population since 2005." An International Crisis Group report published in December 2019 recorded the population of these territories to be 17,000, or 11.48% of the total population: 15,000 west and southwest of the former oblast, and 2000 in the Agdam District.

Until 2000, the country's net migration was at a negative. For the first half of 2007, 1,010 births and 659 deaths were reported, with a net emigration of 27.

According to age group: 15,700 (0–6), 25,200 (7–17) 75,800 (18–59) and 21,000 (60+)

Population by province (2006):

- Stepanakert 54,500 (2013)
- Martuni 23,200
- Martakert 19,000
- Askeran 17,400 (2007)
- Hadrut 12,300 (2009)
- Kashatagh 9,800
- Shushi 5,000 (2009)
- Shahumyan 2,800

Population of the Republic of Artsakh (2000–2008)

Year	Population (000s)	Urban (000s)	Rural (000s)	Birth rate	Death rate	NGR	Net immigration
2000	134.4	68.4	66.0	16.6	8.8	7.7	16.1
2001	135.7	68.7	67.0	17.0	7.9	9.1	11.5
2002	136.6	69.3	67.3	16.0	9.1	6.9	4.9
2003	137.0	69.1	67.9	15.0	9.0	6.0	1.3
2004	137.2	69.8	67.4	15.3	9.5	5.8	−2.6
2005	137.7	70.5	67.2	14.6	9.2	5.4	1.7
2006	137.7	70.8	66.9	15.3	9.0	6.3	−3.2
2007	138.8	71.6	67.2	15.4	8.8	6.6	−1.4
2008	139.9	72.7	67.2	17.3	9.4	7.9	2.6

=== Resettlement attempts after 1994 ===
From 1989 to 1994, there was significant depopulation in the territory that ended up held by Artsakh, leaving only around 40% of the pre-war population. Much of this was due to the displacement and death of Azerbaijani residents in both the former NKOA and the surrounding territories, leaving some former urban areas virtually empty. The Russian minority present also declined, meaning the resulting population was almost 100% Armenian. Beginning in 1995, the population began to increase due to births and immigration.

While the territory captured outside the former NKAO was initially treated as a potential bargaining chip, it slowly began to be seen as part of the country by both officials and the general population. The Stepanakert-based administration launched various programs aimed at bringing in permanent Armenian settlers to the depopulated lands, including into regions previously populated by Azeris, with those that bordered Armenia – Lachin and Kalbajar – being the priority. Lachin was key to a land connection between Armenia and the former NKAO, and Kalbajar had water resources utilised by both Artsakh and Armenia.

Azerbaijan regards this as a violation of Article 49 of the Fourth Geneva Convention, to which Armenia became party in 1993, whereby "[t]he Occupying Power shall not deport or transfer parts of its own civilian population into the territory it occupies". The ruling party of Azerbaijan accuses the Armenian side of artificially changing the demographic situation and the ethnic composition of the occupied region so that it can lay future claims to them, comparing this to the 1950s campaign of resettling diaspora Armenians in previously Azeri-populated locales in Soviet Armenia where Azeris were forcibly deported from in 1948–1950.

In 1979, the total Armenian population of the districts of Kalbajar, Lachin, Qubadli, Zangilan, Jabrayil, Fuzuli and Agdam was around 1,400 people. An OSCE fact-finding mission established at Azerbaijan's request visited these regions in February 2005 with the intention to assess the scale of the settlement attempts. The mission's findings showed that these districts had as of 2005 an overall population of 14,000 people, mostly living in precarious social conditions. It consisted primarily of ethnic Armenians displaced from the non-conflict zones of Azerbaijan during the war. It was noted, however, that most of them had settled in the conflict zone after having lived in Armenia for several years and some held Armenian passports and even voted in Armenian elections. A smaller segment of the settlers was originally from the towns of Gyumri and Spitak in Armenia who had lived in temporary shelters following the devastating 1988 earthquake before moving to Karabakh, as well as a small number of natives of Yerevan who moved there for financial reasons. A field assessment mission revisited the region in October 2010, confirming that there had not been much growth in population or change in the living conditions of the settlers. The Co-Chairs of the Minsk Group who visited Nagorno-Karabakh, Kalbajar and Lachin in 2014 reported seeing signs of improvements in the infrastructure but could not observe any indications that the size of the population had changed in recent years.

By June 2015, an estimated 17,000 of Syria's once 80,000-strong Armenian population had fled the civil war and sought refuge in Armenia. David Babayan, spokesperson of the Artsakh leader Bako Sahakyan, confirmed that some of those refugees had been resettled in Artsakh. The Economist put the number of the resettled families at 30 as of June 2017. In December 2014, Armenian media cited local municipal authorities in stating that dozens of Syrian Armenian families had been resettled in the disputed zone, in particular in the city of Lachin and the village of Xanlıq in Qubadli. Azerbaijan's Minister of Foreign Affairs Elmar Mammadyarov expressed his concern over Armenia's attempts to change the demographic situation in the region and informed of his intention to raise this issue with the Minsk Group.

In February 2019, Armenia's National Security Service director Artur Vanetsyan visited Nagorno-Karabakh amid public concern about Nikol Pashinyan's government alleged readiness to cede some of the Armenian-controlled territories as part of a peace settlement. Vanetsyan pointed out that settling Armenians and investing into infrastructural projects along the Iranian border, in the previously Azeri-populated regions outside of the former autonomous province, was "a clear message" to the international community that there would be no territorial concessions. He referred to the ongoing settlement efforts as a method of "guaranteeing security". Azerbaijan's Foreign Ministry reacted by qualifying Vanetsyan's statement as an "attempt to undermine the peace talks and defy the work of the mediators" and vowed to address the issue to the UN and the OSCE.

The ceasefire ending the 2020 war stipulated that these territories were to be turned over to Azerbaijani control. Armenian settlers in these areas evacuated prior to the arrival of Azerbaijani forces.

=== Ethnic composition ===
Ethnic Groups of the Nagorno-Karabakh Autonomous Oblast (1926–1989) and the Republic of Artsakh (2015) according to census data

Eth.	1921		1926		1939		1959		1970		1979		1989		2005		2015 ^{1}	
Eth.	#	%	#	%	#	%	#	%	#	%	#	%	#	%	#	%	#	%
Arm.	122,800	89	111,694	89.1	132,800	88.0	110,053	84.4	121,068	80.5	123,076	75.9	145,450	76.9	137,380	99.7	144,683	99.7
Aze.	15,400	11	12,592	10.0	14,053	9.3	17,995	13.8	27,179	18.1	37,264	23.0	40,688	21.5	6	0.0		
Rus.			596	0.5	3,174	2.1	1,790	1.4	1,310	0.9	1,265	0.8	1,922	1.0	171	0.1	238	0.2
Ukr.					436	0.3			193	0.1	140	0.1	416	0.2	21	0.0	26	0.0
Yez.																	16	0.0
Ass.																	16	0.0
Geo.																	15	0.0
Oth.			416	0.3	374	0.2	568	0.4	563	0.4	436	0.3	609	0.3	159	0.1	59	0.0
Total	138,500		125,300		150,837		130,406		150,313		162,181		189,085		137,737		145,053	
The territorial borders of the Nagorno-Karabakh AO and the Artsakh Republic are different. The population of Artsakh-occupied territories surrounding Nagorno-Karabakh was at least 201,016 and at most 421,726 people in 1989.

=== Languages ===
Armenian functioned as the only state language and an official language in the Republic of Artsakh, and was the native language of over 99% of the population. Under Soviet rule, the ethnic Armenian population of Nagorno-Karabakh became more proficient in Russian than both Azerbaijanis in the region and Armenians in the Armenian SSR. Few Armenians learnt Azerbaijani, and the language was actively removed following the Nagorno-Karabakh War. While Russian remained in some use after this time, and was valued as a second language, it was not widely spoken at a native level.

Russian was widely spoken in Artsakh, with efforts having been made since late 2020 in the parliament in Stepanakert to establish it as an additional official language; the official justifications for this being that Russian was already the second language of many residents, and that it would create "conditions for deepening cooperation in all spheres, [as well as contributing] to the development of relations within the legal framework." The Parliament of Artsakh approved a bill grating Russian official status on 25 March 2021, with 27 votes in favour, 0 votes against and 2 abstentions.

=== Religion ===
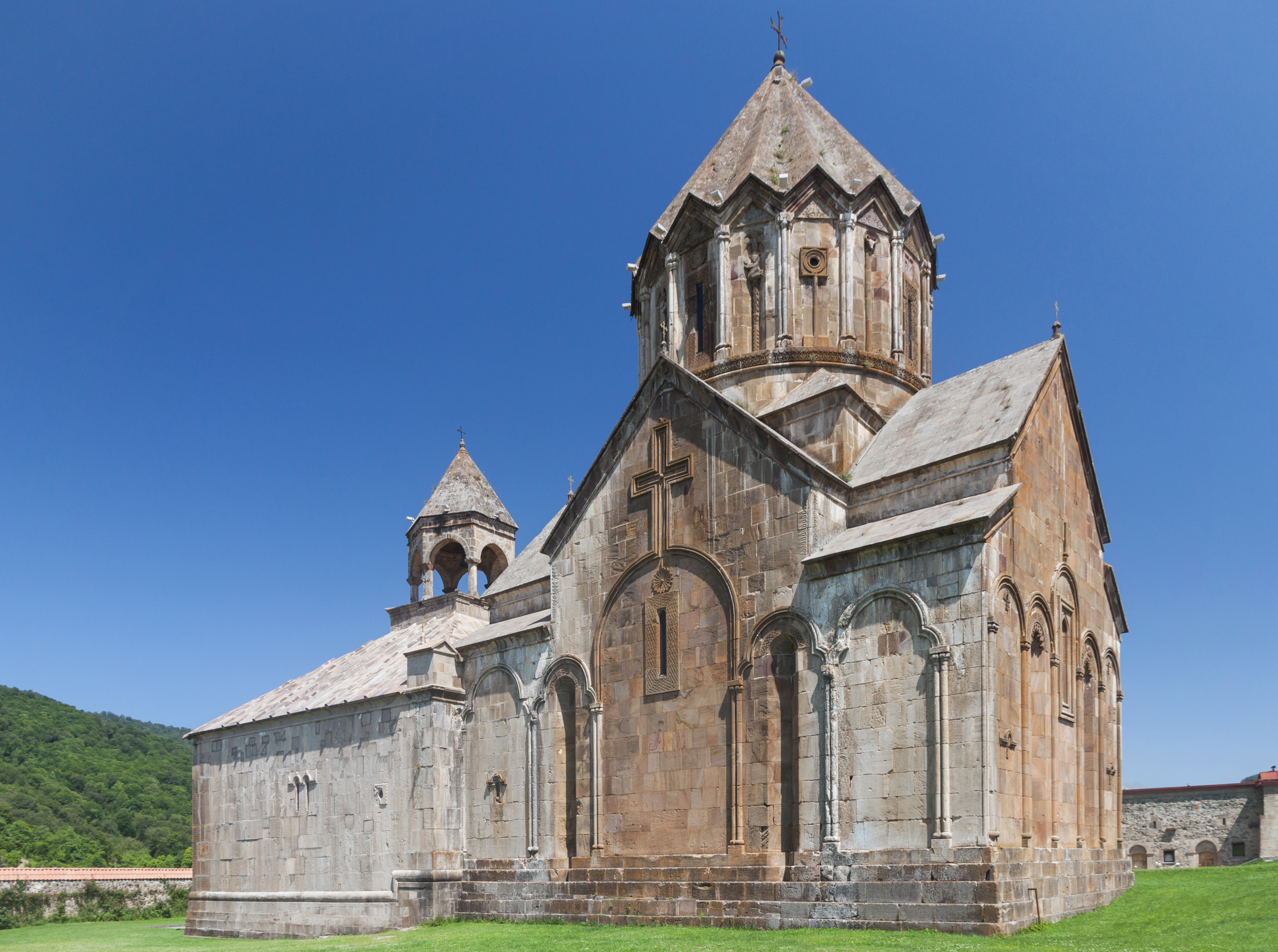
Gandzasar Cathedral

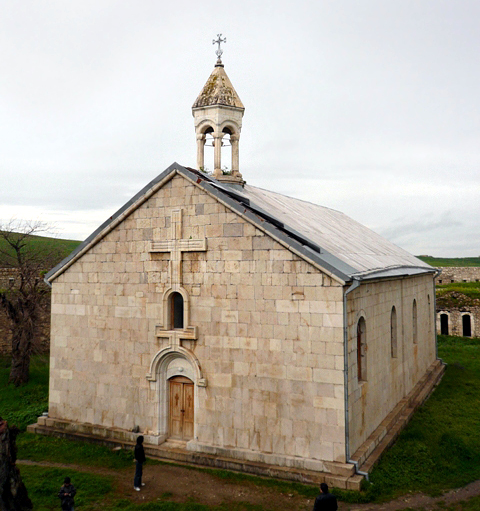
Church of St. Grigoris of the Amaras Monastery

Most of the Armenian population in Artsakh was Christian and were adherents of the Armenian Apostolic Church, which is an Oriental Orthodox Church. Some Eastern Orthodox and Evangelical denominations also existed.

==== Armenian monasteries and churches ====
- Amaras Monastery (4th century), located near the villages of Sos and Machkalashen in the Martuni Province. According to medieval chroniclers Faustus Byuzand and Movses Kaghankatvatsi, St. Gregory the Illuminator, the patron saint and evangeliser of Armenia, founded the Amaras Monastery at the start of the fourth century. At the beginning of the fifth century Mesrop Mashtots, the inventor of the Armenian alphabet, established in Amaras the first-ever school that used his script.
- Yeghishe Arakyal Monastery (5th–13th centuries) commemorating St. Yeghishe, the famous evangeliser of Armenia's eastern lands. The church serves as a burial ground for the fifth century's King Vachagan II the Pious, the most well-known representative of the Arranshahik line of east Armenian monarchs. The monastery is located in the Martakert Province.
- Bri Yeghtsi Monastery (13th century) that centres on embedded khachkars, unique-to-Armenia stone memorials with engraved crosses. The monastery is located near the village of Hatsi in the Martuni Province.
- Gandzasar monastery (13th century), ("Գանձասար" in Armenian) is a historical monastery in Artsakh. Artsakhi government's aim is to include the Gandzasar Monastery into the directory of the UNESCO's World Heritage Sites.
- Yerits Mankants Monastery (meaning "three infants" in Armenian; 17th century) is known for hosting the seat of Artsakh's rival clergy to that of the Holy See of Gandzasar. The monastery is located in the Martakert Province.
- Saint John the Baptist Church, located in the town of Martakert, built in 1883.
- Church of St. Nerses the Great, located in the town of Martuni, consecrated in 2004. It is dedicated to the famous Armenian Catholicos, Saint Narses the Great.
- Holy Mother of God Cathedral in the city of Stepanakert, consecrated in 2019.
- Katarovank Monastery was founded in the fourth century, and is located close to the village of Hin Tagher in the Hadrut Province. The present-day chapel is a 17th-century structure. There are Armenian khachkars near the chapel. The monastery offers a unique panoramic view to the River Araxes.
- Tsitsernavank Monastery (4th century) is the best-preserved example of an Armenian basilica with three naves. The monastery is located in the village of Tsitsernavank in the Kashatagh Province.
- Dadivank Monastery (Armenian: Դադիվանք), also known as Khutavank (Armenian: Խութավանք – Monastery on the Hill), that was built between the 9th and 13th century. It is one of the most architecturally and culturally significant monasteries in Artsakh. The western façade of Dadivank's Memorial Cathedral bears one of the most extensive Armenian lapidary (stone-inscribed) texts, and has one of the largest collection of medieval Armenian frescoes. Dadivank is named after St. Dadi, a disciple of Apostle Thaddeus who preached the Holy Gospel in Artsakh in the first century. St. Dadi's tomb was later discovered by archaeologists in 2007. The monastery is in the Shahumyan Province and has been placed under the protection of the Russian peacekeeping forces.
- Gtichavank Monastery (13th century) has design features shared with the architectural style of medieval Armenia's capital city of Ani. The monastery is located in the Hadrut Province.
- Ghazanchetsots Cathedral, built 1868–1888 (Սուրբ Ամենափրկիչ Ղազանչեցոց Եկեղեցի – "Surb Amenap'rkich Ghazanchets'ots' Yekeghets'i" in Armenian), also known as the Cathedral of Christ the Savior and the Shushi Cathedral, is an Armenian church located in Shusha. It is the main cathedral and headquarters of the Armenian Apostolic Church's "Diocese of Artsakh".
- Just uphill from the cathedral in Shusha is the church of Kanach Zham ('Green Church' in Armenian), built in 1847.

=== Education ===
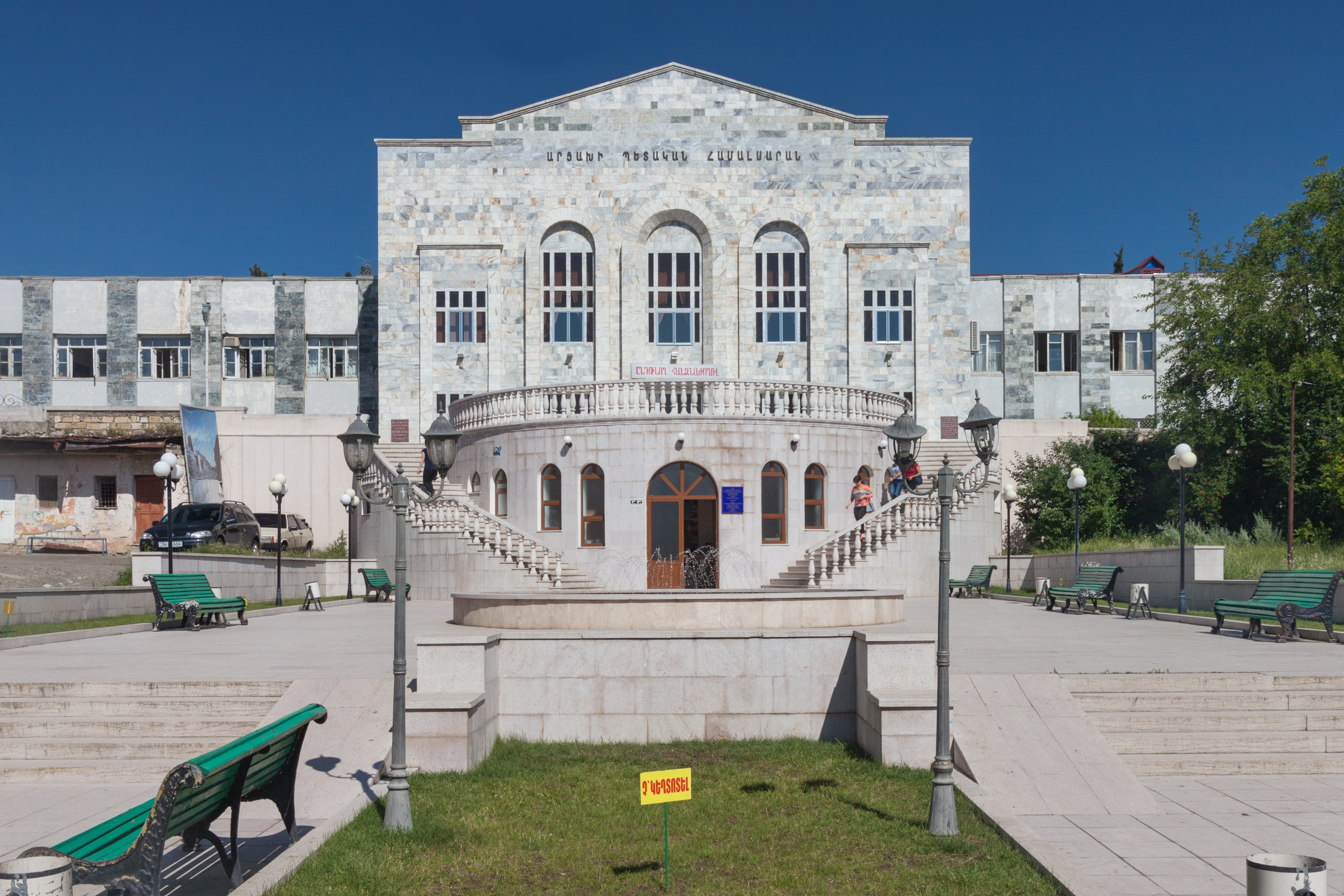
Artsakh State University

Education in Artsakh was compulsory, and was free up to the age of 18. The education system was inherited from the old system of the Soviet Union. Artsakh's school system was severely damaged because of the 1991–1994 conflict. However, the government of the Republic of Artsakh with considerable aid from the Republic of Armenia and with donations from the Armenian diaspora, rebuilt many of the schools. Prior to the 2020 war, Artsakh had around 250 schools of various sizes, with more than 200 lying in the regions. The student population was estimated at more than 20,000, with almost half in the capital city of Stepanakert.

Artsakh State University was founded by Artsakh and Armenian governments' joint efforts, with main campus in Stepanakert. The university opening ceremony took place on 10 May 1992. Yerevan University of Management also opened a branch in Stepanakert.

==== Universities ====
This is a list of universities in Republic of Artsakh, a former breakaway state in the Caucasus region.

===== State universities =====
- Artsakh State University (Stepanakert)
- Stepanakert branch of the Armenian National Agrarian University (Stepanakert)

===== Commercial universities =====
- Grigor Narekatsi University (Stepanakert)
- University Mesrop Mashtots (Stepanakert)
- Hagop Gyurjyan Institute of Applied Art (Shushi)

===== Colleges =====
- Stepanakert Agricultural College (Stepanakert)
- Stepanakert Choreographic College (Stepanakert)
- Stepanakert Medical College named after T. Kamalian (Stepanakert)
- Stepanakert Musical College named after Sayat-Nova (Stepanakert)
- Shushi Liberal Arts College named after Arsen Khachatryan (Shushi)

===== Military academies =====
- Suvorov and Madatov Military Academy (Stepanakert)
- Kristapor Ivanyan Military Academy (Stepanakert)

== Culture ==
=== Monuments ===
"We Are Our Mountains" (Armenian: Մենք ենք մեր սարերը) by Sargis Baghdasaryan is a monument located in Stepanakert. The sculpture was widely regarded as a symbol of the Republic of Artsakh. It is a large monument from tuff of an old Armenian man and woman hewn from rock, representing the mountain people of Artsakh. It is also known as Tatik yev Papik (Տատիկ և Պապիկ, "Grandma and Grandpa") in Armenian. The sculpture was featured prominently on Artsakh's coat of arms. Artsakh has often been portrayed as a "shield" to the Armenian nation that protects it from Pan-Turkism. When lecturing his fighters during the First Nagorno Karabakh-War, Monte Melkonian would say "If we lose this land, we turn the last page on Armenian history."

=== Museums ===
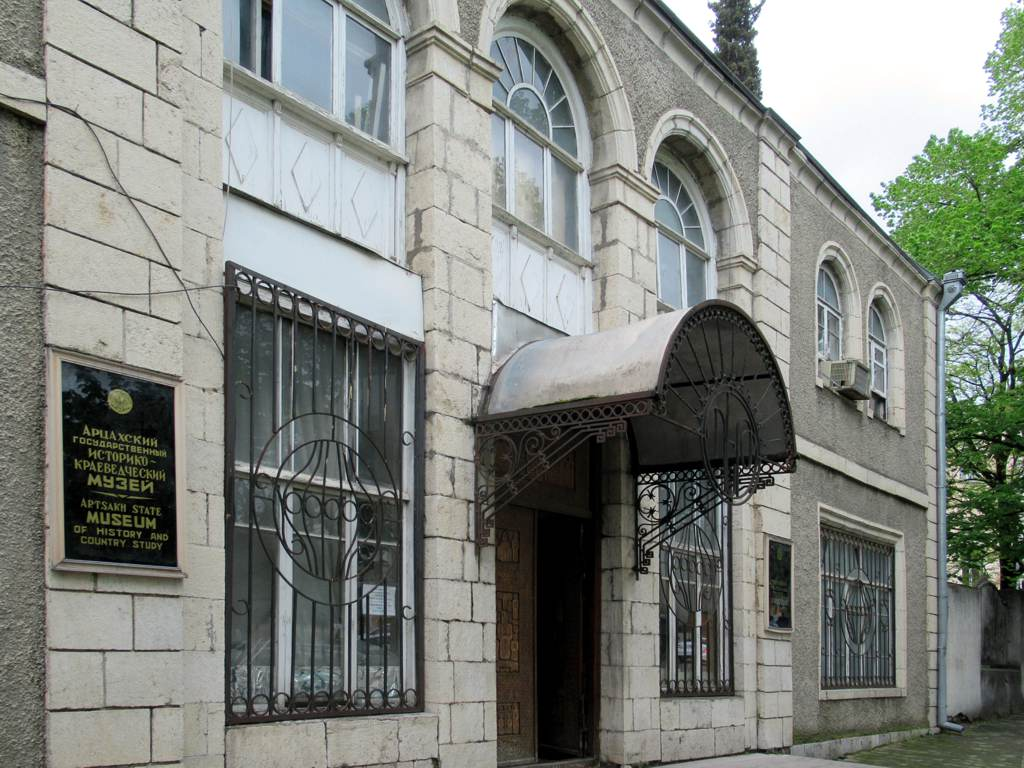
Artsakh State Museum

Artsakh State Museum was the historical museum of the Republic of Artsakh. Located at 4 Sasunstsi David Street, in Stepanakert, the museum offered an assortment of ancient artefacts and Christian manuscripts. There were also more recent items, ranging in date from the 19th century to World War II and from events of the Karabakh Independence War.

=== Publications ===
Azat Artsakh (Armenian: Ազատ Արձախ, lit. 'Free Artsakh') was the official newspaper of the Republic of Artsakh. It had a daily print and was offered in Armenian, English, and Russian. Typical topics included the Nagorno-Karabakh conflict, Armenian genocide, and other Armenian-related issues. Aside from Azat Artsakh, many print media were published in more than one language, usually offering Russian and English sections in addition to the main Armenian section.

=== Sports ===
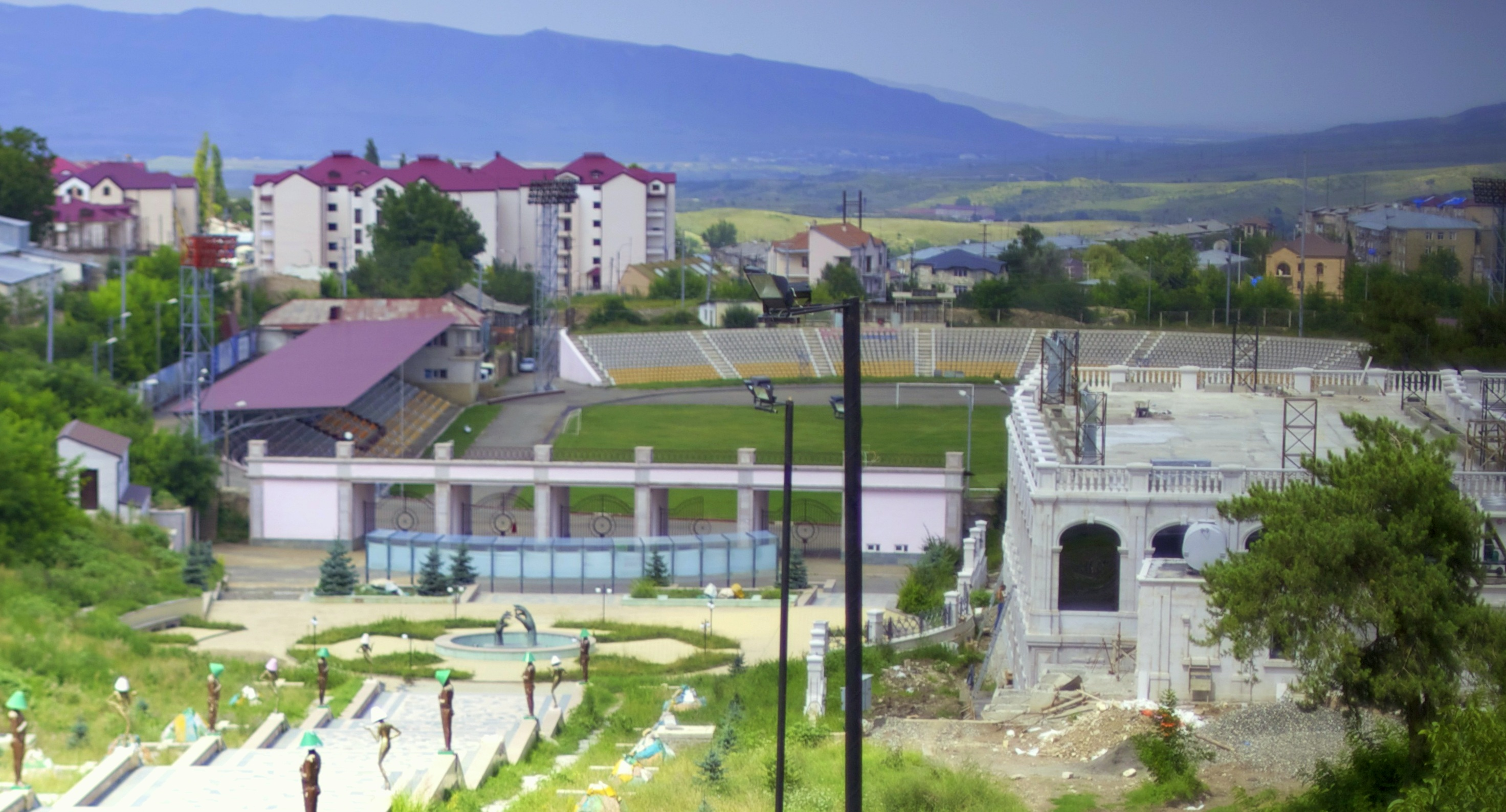
Stepanakert Republican Stadium in Stepanakert

Sports in the Republic of Artsakh were organised by the Artsakh Ministry of Culture and Youth. Due to the non-recognition of Artsakh, sports teams from the country could not compete in most international tournaments.

Football was the most popular sport in Artsakh. Stepanakert had a well-built football stadium. In mid-1990s, football teams from Artsakh started taking part in some domestic competitions in Armenia. Lernayin Artsakh FC represented the city of Stepanakert. In Artsakh, domestic football clubs played in the Artsakh Football League. The Artsakh football league was launched in 2009. The Artsakh national football team was formed in 2012 and played their first competitive match against the Abkhazia national football team in Sokhumi, a match that ended with a result of 1–1 draw. The return match between the unrecognised teams took place at the Stepanakert Stadium, on 21 October 2012, when the team from Artsakh defeated the Abkhazian team 3–0.

There was also interest in other sports, including basketball and volleyball. Sailing was practised in the town of Martakert. Artsakh sports teams and athletes also participated in the Pan-Armenian Games organised in Armenia.

=== Holidays ===
The following is a list of public holidays in the Republic of Artsakh:

Date	English name
31 December – 1 January	New Year's Day
6 January	Christmas
28 January	Homeland Defender's Day
20 February	Artsakh Revival Day
8 March	International Women's Day
7 April	Motherhood and Beauty Day
24 April	Armenian Genocide Remembrance Day
1 May	Worker's Solidarity Day
9 May	Victory, Armed Forces & Shushi Liberation Day
28 May	First Armenian Republic Day
1 June	Children's Day
29 June	Fallen Soldiers' and Missing in Action Memorial Day
2 September	Republic Day
7 December	Armenian Earthquake Memorial Day
10 December	Constitution Day

== See also ==
- Armenian-occupied territories surrounding Nagorno-Karabakh
- Community for Democracy and Rights of Nations
- Foreign relations of Artsakh
- Janapar – Multi-section hiking trail going through much of Karabakh
- Outline of the Republic of Artsakh

== Bibliography ==
- Waal, Thomas de (2004). Black garden: Armenia and Azerbaijan through peace and war. New York: New York University Press. p. 42. ISBN 9780814719459.
