= 2023 Nagorno-Karabakh ceasefire agreement =

Ceasefire agreement ending Azerbaijani military offensive

- Type: Armistice
- Context: 2023 Azerbaijani offensive in Nagorno-Karabakh
- Signed: 20 September 2023
- Effective: 21 September 2023
- Mediators: Russian peacekeeping forces

On 20 September 2023 a ceasefire agreement ending the Azerbaijani military offensive against the self-proclaimed ethnic Armenian Republic of Artsakh in Nagorno-Karabakh was reached. The agreement was brokered by the Russian peacekeeping contingent stationed in the region since the Second Nagorno-Karabakh War in 2020. Under the terms of the agreement, the Artsakh Defence Army was disbanded. The Russian peacekeepers sheltered at their base camp 2,261 people, of whom 1,049 were children.

== Background ==
Nagorno-Karabakh has been a disputed region between Azerbaijan and local ethnic Armenians. In 1991 the breakaway Armenian Republic of Artsakh, formerly the Nagorno-Karabakh Republic, was formed there, but the region remained internationally recognized as part of Azerbaijan. The Republic of Artsakh soon formed its own military, the Artsakh Defence Army (ADA).

On 19 September 2023, Azerbaijan launched a military offensive in the region against the Artsakhi armed forces. Azerbaijan cited several prior landmine incidents in the region: two separate explosions killed six people, another one killed two employees of the Azerbaijani highway department, four more were killed while responding to the incident, with another mine explosion killing four soldiers and two civilians. Russian Foreign Ministry spokeswoman Maria Zakharova said the Russian peacekeepers were notified only "a few minutes" before the Azerbaijani offensive began. The Azerbaijani Ministry of Defense reported that positions on the front line and in-depth, long-term firing points of the formations of the Artsakh Defence Army, as well as combat assets and military facilities had been incapacitated using high-precision weapons.

On 20 September, the ADA reported that Azerbaijani troops had broken through their lines and captured several heights and strategic road junctions. On the same day, at an early morning press conference, Azerbaijani Colonel Anar Eyvazov called upon local ethnic Armenian forces to lay down their arms and surrender. Shortly thereafter, the authorities of the Republic of Artsakh said they had accepted the proposal of the command of the Russian peacekeeping contingent regarding a ceasefire.

== Agreement ==
The ceasefire agreement was reached on 20 September 2023, at 13:00 AZT under the following terms: the Artsakh Defence Army and all Armenian armed formations in the region would lay down their arms, leave combat positions and military posts and completely disarm, all units of the Armenian armed forces would leave the internationally recognized territory of Azerbaijan, ethnic Armenian armed formations would be disbanded with the simultaneous surrender of all weapons and heavy equipment, while the implementation of those conditions would be ensured in coordination with the Russian peacekeeping contingent.

Russia-mediated negotiations began on 21 September 2023 in Yevlakh over the agreement's terms, particularly the disarmament of the ADA and the reintegration of the Nagorno-Karabakhi population into Azerbaijan.

=== Disarmament ===
By 26 September 2023, Azerbaijan had seized 251,308 pieces of ammunition, 1,674 accoutrements, 909 small arms and grenades, 226 air defense weapons, 164 optical and other devices, 75 non-armored vehicles, 47 pieces of artillery, 22 armored vehicles and 21 trailers from the ADA. On 28 September 2023, the updated list comprised 652,842 cartridges, 6,653 mortar shells, 2,722 cannon and howitzer shells, 2,627 anti-aircraft cannon shells, 2,266 grenades, 2,132 other pieces of ammunition, 2,076 assorted supply equipment, 1,368 hand grenades, 1,151 small arms, 984 rockets, 132 air defense weapons, 84 grenade launchers, 39 mortars, 18 armored vehicles and some other equipment.

== Reactions ==
In a televised address later on 20 September, Azerbaijan's president, Ilham Aliyev announced that the country had "restored its sovereignty" over Nagorno-Karabakh after the offensive, achieving the "complete surrender" of local Armenian forces.

Armenian Prime Minister Nikol Pashinyan distanced himself from the agreement, saying that Armenia had not been involved in drafting the ceasefire and that "Armenia doesn’t have an army in Nagorno-Karabakh". Nonetheless, Pashinyan said he supported the ceasefire and it was "very important" that it held. Protests in Yerevan, the capital of Armenia, began over the government's alleged failure to protect ethnic Armenians, with protestors demanding the resignation of Pashinyan.

== Aftermath ==
The Republic of Artsakh ultimately agreed to dissolve itself by 1 January 2024. On 22 December 2023, president Samvel Shahramanyan said that there was no official document stipulating the dissolution of government institutions, implying that the republic may continue as a government in exile. On 21 May 2025, his presidential term expired. As a result, Ashot Danielyan, who was also elected President of the National Assembly in exile, assumed presidential powers.

== See also ==
- 2020 Nagorno-Karabakh ceasefire agreement
- Bishkek Protocol
