= Ayb =

Ayb or AYB may refer to:

- Ayb (letter), a letter of the Armenian alphabet
- Ayb Educational Foundation, in Armenia
  - Ayb School
- All your base are belong to us (sometimes abbreviated as AYB), an internet meme
- Anchor Yale Bible Series

== See also ==
- Eyb
