= Cybiko =

Handheld game console and PDA

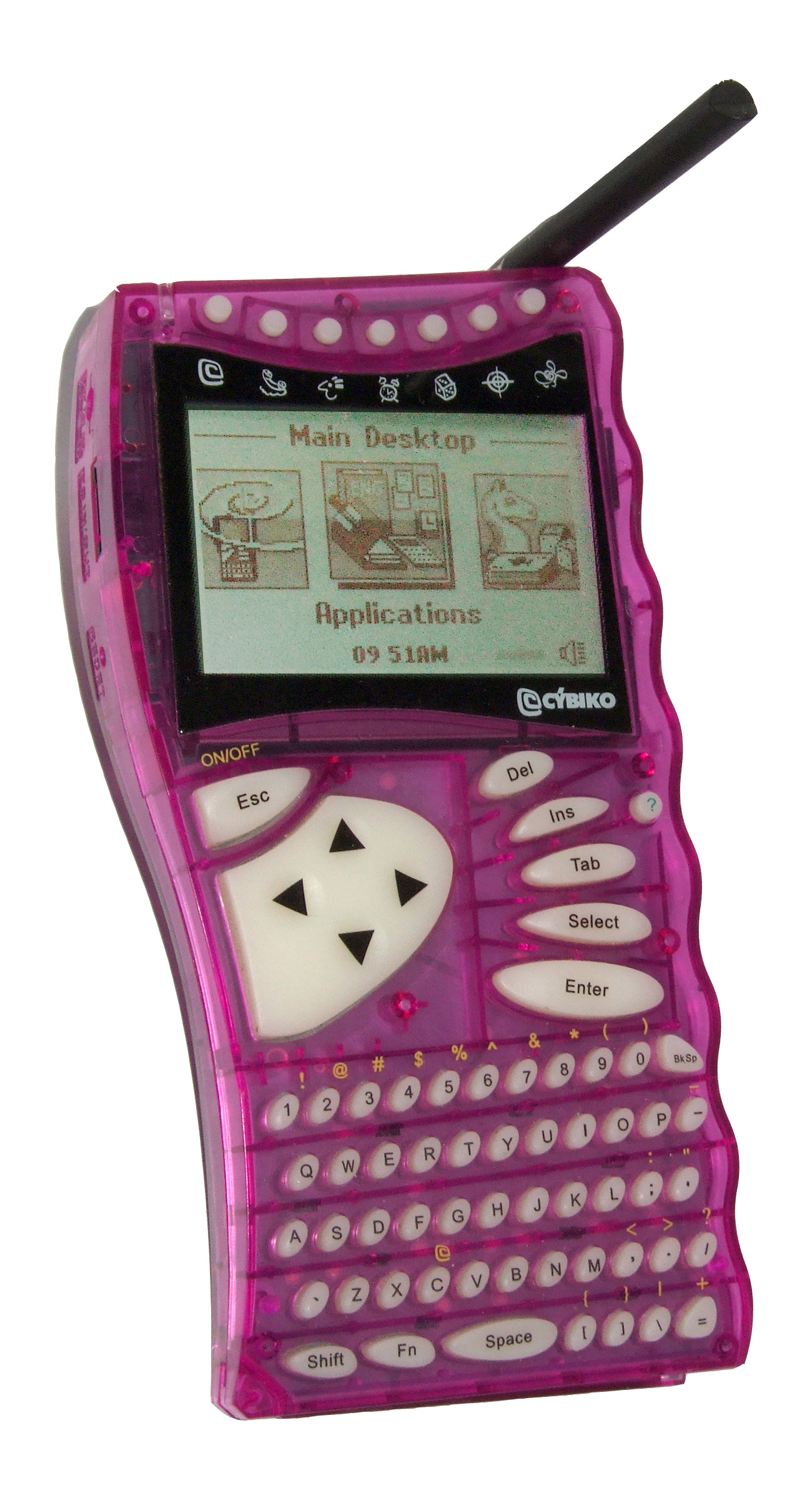
- Cybiko Classic with antenna extended, displaying the main desktop
- Developer: Cybiko Inc.
- Type: Handheld game console / PDA
- Generation: Sixth generation
- Released: April 2000
- CPU: Hitachi H8S Family
- Display: 160×100 4-bit greyscale LCD
- Dimensions: 2.2 by 7.1 by 14.5 centimetres (0.87 in × 2.80 in × 5.71 in)
- Weight: 122 grams (4.3 oz)
- Successor: Cybiko Xtreme

The Cybiko is a line of personal digital assistants and handheld game consoles first released by Cybiko Inc. in 2000. Cybiko Inc. was a startup company founded by David Yang; the eponymous PDA was first test marketed in New York in April 2000 and rolled out nationwide in May 2000. It was designed for teens, featuring its own two-way radio text messaging system. It has over 430 "official" freeware games and applications. It features a rubber QWERTY keyboard. An MP3 player add-on with a SmartMedia card slot was made for the unit as well. Cybikos can communicate with each other up to a maximum range of 100 meters (330 ft). Several Cybikos can chat with each other in a wireless chatroom. By the end of 2000, the Cybiko Classic had sold over 500,000 units. The company stopped manufacturing the units after two product versions and a few years on the market.

== History ==
Cybiko development was initiated in 1998 by Russian entrepreneur David Yang, founder of ABBYY Software House. The concept for the device emerged from social research conducted in six countries, which identified a need for digital communication among youth. The first prototype was completed by October 1998. By the end of 1999, three industrial samples had been produced, and a radio protocol was patented. This protocol allowed up to 3,000 Cybiko devices to form a network without using auxiliary stations. By early 1999, the Moscow-based development team had grown to 40 employees. The Cybiko was designed as a handheld computer for teenagers, combining communication capabilities with entertainment features. It included a QWERTY keyboard, a monochrome display, short-range radio messaging, and support for downloadable applications and games.

Inventec, a Taiwanese manufacturer, was contracted for device production, while marketing was entrusted to Poznik & Kolker, an American firm known for their successful promotion of Furby toys. Although initially scheduled for September 1999, Cybiko's launch was delayed until early 2000 due to difficulties in casing production. This issue consumed a significant portion of the project's initial budget, with $70,000 of the $120,000 allocated to casing development. Prior to Cybiko's official New York presentation, David Yang met with ICQ founder Yossi Vardi. Vardi, impressed by the device, introduced Yang to America Online CEO Steve Case, which subsequently led to substantial investment in the project.

Cybiko was released in the U.S. market in 2000 after securing $20 million in investments. The device launched in April with a trial run in select New York retailers, including FAO Schwarz, Virgin Megastores, and Software Etc/Babbage's, before expanding nationwide in mid-May. Its features, such as short-range messaging, file sharing, and the ability to discover nearby users, quickly garnered popularity and media attention. The initial retail price was set at $139. Sales performance was strong, with devices worth $25 million sold during the first three weeks of the holiday season, contributing to total first-year sales of approximately 250,000 units.

In 2001, Cybiko introduced an upgraded model, the Cybiko Xtreme, featuring improved design and specifications. However, the emergence of more affordable internet-capable mobile phones posed significant competition. Despite initial market success, the company encountered financial challenges exacerbated by the early 2000s dot-com crisis, which hindered new investment efforts. A planned London device launch on September 15, 2001, was canceled due to the September 11 attacks, further impacting the company's financial position.

Late 2001 saw the company restructure into two entities: Cybiko Advance Technologies, retaining ownership of the wireless network, and CWAG (Cybiko Wireless Applications and Games), which acquired the game development portfolio and other intellectual assets. -CWAG subsequently began collaborating with mobile companies such as Motorola, Sprint, and Nokia to adapt its software for mobile phone platforms. In 2003, Cybiko Inc. announced that it would cease production of its communicators.

== Models ==
=== Cybiko Classic ===
There are two models of the Classic Cybiko. Visually, the only difference is that the original version has a power switch on the side, while the updated version uses the "escape" key for power management. Internally, the differences between the two models are in the internal memory and the firmware location.

The CPU is a Hitachi H8S/2241 clocked at 11.0592 MHz and the Cybiko Classic also has an Atmel AT90S2313 co-processor, clocked at 4 MHz to provide some support for RF communications. It has 512KB flash memory-based ROM flash memory and 256KB RAM installed. An add-on slot is located in the rear.

The Cybiko Classics were sold in five colors: blue, purple, neon green, white, and black. The black version has a yellow keypad, instead of the white unit found on other Cybikos.

The add-on slot has the same pin arrangement as a PC card, but it is not electrically compatible.

=== Cybiko Xtreme ===
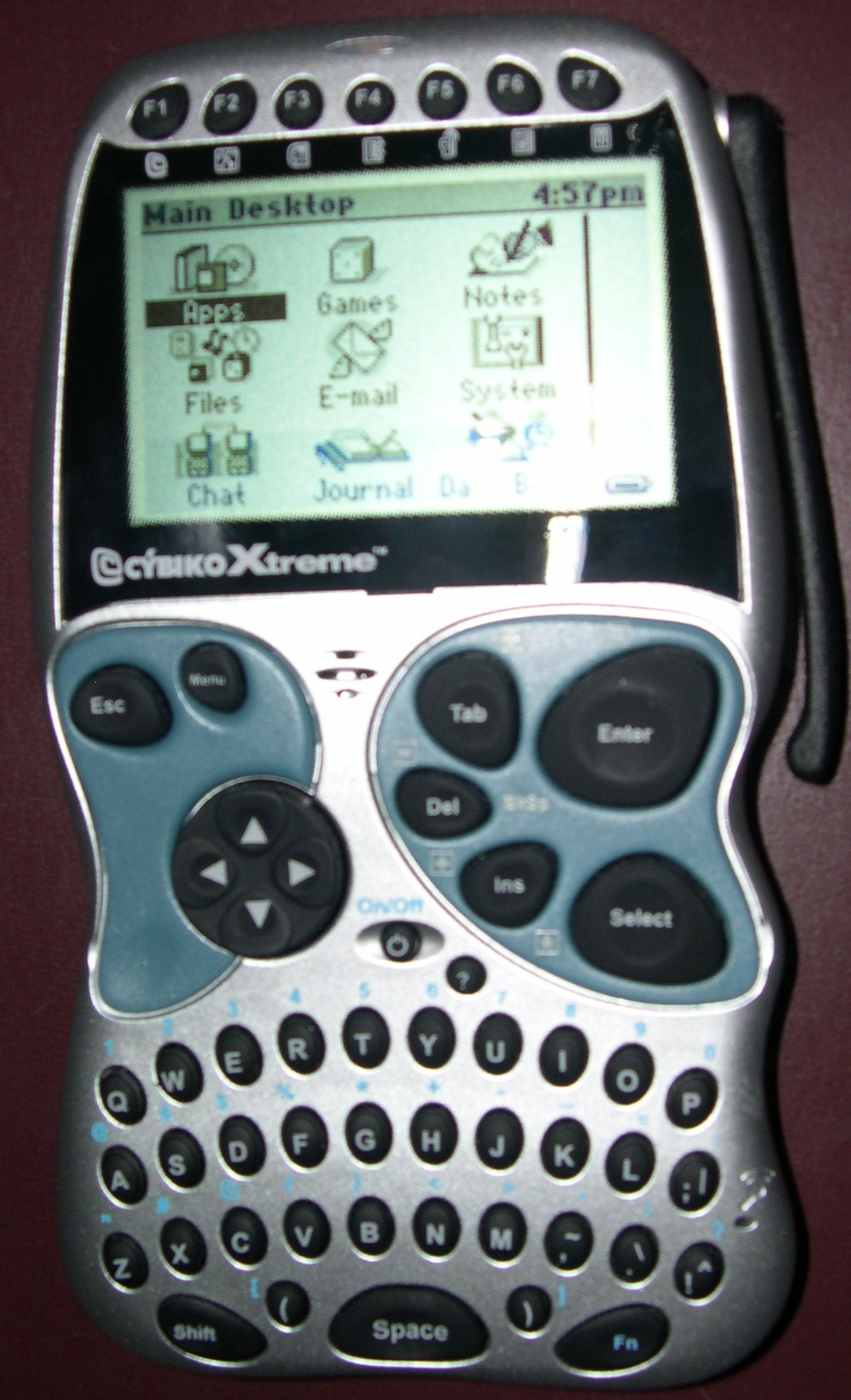
Cybiko Xtreme with antenna folded down, running the main desktop

The Cybiko Xtreme is the second-generation Cybiko handheld. It features various improvements over the original Cybiko, such as a faster processor, more RAM, more ROM, a new operating system, a new keyboard layout and case design, greater wireless range, a microphone, improved audio output, and smaller size.

The CPU is a Hitachi H8S/2323 at 18 MHz, and like the original version, it also has an Atmel AT90S2313 co-processor at 4 MHz to provide some support for RF communications. 512KiB ROM flash memory and 1.5MiB RAM is installed. It features an add-on slot in the rear, which is compatible with the MP3 player.

It was released in two variants. US variant (Model No. CY44801) has frequency range of 902-928 MHz and European variant (Model No. CY44802) with frequency range of 868-870 MHz. No other functional difference exists between these variants.

== Options ==
=== MP3 player ===
- Classic MP3 Player: The MP3 player for the Classic plugs into the bottom of the Cybiko and used SmartMedia cards; it can support a maximum size of 64 MB. The player has built-in controls.
- Xtreme MP3 Player: The MP3 player plugs into the rear of the Cybiko Xtreme. It has a slot for one MMC memory card. The MP3 player can only be controlled from the Cybiko. A memory card from the MP3 player can also be addressed from the Cybiko and used for data and program storage.

=== 1MB Expansion Memory ===
The memory expansion card plugs into the rear of the Cybiko. It provides 256 kilobytes of static RAM, and 1 megabyte of data flash memory. The RAM allows programs with larger memory requirements to run. The data flash allows more programs to be stored. Some Cybiko programs will not run unless the Expansion Memory is plugged in.

== Games ==
A large number of games were produced for the Cybiko. Programs were posted daily on the website and can be downloaded using the CyberLoad application. Many games support multiplayer mode with automatic saves, which allowed resuming the game in case of a connection loss. Some of the Gamos company games were ported to the Cybiko, including Color Lines under the Funny Balls title, and Snake Battle.

The first games on the Cybiko were initially created in the genre of classic board games – chess, checkers, backgammon, kalah, renju and seega. The "casual" puzzle games Phat Cash and Tooty Fruity were also made, with the latter requiring the Cybiko to be held horizontally. A first-person shooter engine was written, on which the game Lost in Labyrinth is built, similar in gameplay to Wolfenstein 3D. The popular skateboarding game Blazing Boards is based on the racing engine which was later used as the basis for Tony Hawk's Pro Skater for cell phones, in a collaboration between Cybiko and THQ. Turn-based strategy and real-time strategy games include Warfare and Land of Kings, with the latter requiring a memory card to work.

The flagship game on the system is CyLandia, which combines the tamagotchi and economic strategy genres. Cybiko devices with the game installed have pets called Cy-B (also called "cypets"), which the player has to raise. The game continues on switched-off devices, and in case of insufficient attention, Cy-B could "run away" to any other Cybiko within range. Players can also voluntarily send pets to other devices.

Toward the end of the Cybiko's lifecycle, quest and RPG genre games were being developed, but were not released. However, the fighting game Knight's Tournament contains role-playing elements, where player characters can be outfitted with various equipment won in tournaments. After the September 11 attacks, a problem of game censorship emerged, which led to the cancellation of the beat-'em-up game Renegade by the American management, in part because the main character is a police officer who beats up hooligans.

== Comparison ==
Name	Cybiko (Classic)	Cybiko Xtreme
Weight	122 g (4.3 oz)	
Dimensions (L × W × H)	71 × 22 × 145 mm (2.80 × 0.87 × 5.71 in)	
Colors	Blue, Purple, Neon Green, White, Black	Silver
Display	LCD with 4-bit grayscale, 59 × 40 mm (2.3 × 1.6 in)	
Resolution	160 × 100 pixels/dots	
Processor	Hitachi H8S/2241 @ 11.06 MHz	Hitachi H8S/2323 @ 18 MHz
Co-processor	Atmel AT90S2313 @ 4 MHz	
RAM	256 kB	1536 kB
Flash ROM	512 kB	
Wired communications	Serial (RS-232, proprietary cable)	Mini USB
Wireless communications	868–870 MHz (Europe); 902–928 MHz (USA)	
