= Swansea Bay Film Festival =

Film festival in Swansea, Wales

The Swansea Bay Film Festival was a film festival organized by The Academy of Media, Recording, Interactive, Television and Stage Arts that took place in Swansea, Wales, between 2006 and 2011. It ended in 2011 after significant criticism of their treatment of entrants

== Festival mission ==
The festival promised to "honour the individual voice". Its goal was to provide a worldwide public forum for independent and experimental film makers and to offer educational outreach. The Swansea Bay Film Festival was a qualifying festival for the British Independent Film Awards. The Academy of Media, Recording, Interactive, Television and Stage Arts (AMRITSA) organized the event and the festival's "Special Selection Committee", composed of seasoned filmmakers, representatives from The City and County of Swansea, The Dylan Thomas Centre, and The Department of Adult and Continuing Education at Swansea University.

== Critical response ==
Director Michael Attardi said that, "The Swansea Film Festival is better than Cannes."*

== Criticism ==
The festival was described by participants as "a sham" and "the worst film festival.". In June 2011 The Guardian headlined the Swansea Bay film festival as a 'disaster'. Filmmakers described an empty festival where they were expected to do all of their own promotion. Catherine Zeta-Jones has resigned as patron of the Swansea Bay Film Festival and Michael Sheen has resigned as vice president following criticism of the festival. Festival organiser Binda Singh has been singled out for the most criticism.

== Winners ==
2010 – main categories

- Best International Documentary:From Ararat to Zion (Armenia)– Edgar Baghdasaryan and Fr Mesrop Aramian
- Best International Feature Film: Carmilla Hyde (Australia) – Dave De Vries
- Best International Environment and Ecological Film: Poison Wind (USA) – Jenny Pond
- Best in the Festival: Shooter (UK) – Ronnie Goodwin
- Best Short Film (Under 20 Mins): Amid The Rubble - Mike Dunkin. D.O.P Jeremy Veale

2009 – main categories

- Best Documentary: War of the Gods (USA) – Jennifer Abbott
- Best International Feature Film: Blue Bus (USA) – Phil Scarpaci
- Best Feature Film: Gods of Circumstance (USA ) – Justin Golding
- Best in Festival: Jackson (USA) – JF Lawton

2008 – main categories

- Best International Short Film: Appassionata (Germany) – Mirko Echghi–Ghamsari

2006 – main categories

- Best Feature Film: Footsteps (UK) – Gareth Evans
- Best Feature Film Under 75 Minutes – Teenage Wasteland (UK) – Andrew Jones (filmmaker)
- Best Short Film (Under 20 Mins): Tomorrow Never Dais (UK) – Anthony James
- Best Short Film (Under 10 Mins): Virtual Insanity (UK) – Noel Hines
- Best Noir: The Girl the Gun & the Desert (UK) – Alun D Pughe
