= David Yang (businessman) =

Russian businessman

- Давид Ян
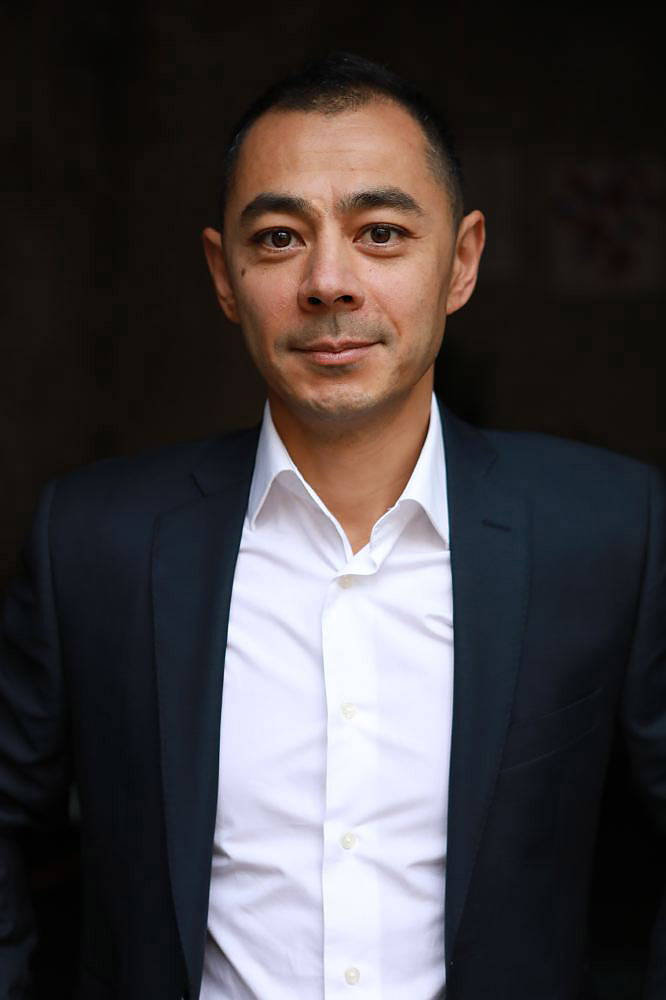
- David Yang in 2022
- Born: June 3, 1968 (age 57); Yerevan, Armenian SSR, Soviet Union
- Education: Moscow Institute of Physics and Technology
- Occupations: Businessman, entrepreneur in the field of IT technologies
- Known for: ABBYY, Fine Reader, Lingvo, iiko, Yva.ai, Cybiko

David Evgenievich Yang (Russian: Давид Евгеньевич Ян; born June 3, 1968) is a Russian businessman, entrepreneur in the field of IT technologies, founder and chairman of the Board of Directors of ABBYY, creator of Fine Reader, Lingvo, Iiko, and Yva.ai products.

== Biography ==
David Yang was born on June 6, 1968, in Yerevan, Armenia.

His father Yang Shi (Russian name Evgeny Andreevich) is a theoretical physicist and professor, originally from China. His mother, Silva Ashotovna, is originally from Armenia. The family lived in a small physical town in Armenia, where David studied.

In 1992 he graduated from the Moscow Institute of Physics and Technology.

In 2003 he defended his dissertation for the degree of Candidate of Physical and Mathematical Sciences.

David Yang is one of the founders of the Ayb Educational Foundation in Armenia, established to promote the development of education in 2006.

He also took part in the project of the Tumo educational center.

Since 2018 he has been building a house in Silicon Valley, which for the first time is controlled by an emotional artificial intelligence named Morpheus. There are more than 100,000 cameras and 40 microphones in the smart home.

In 2019 Yang was a member of the Board of Directors of Forbes Russia.

In 2023 David Yang became one of the founders of the INAU startup to help people with mental disabilities communicate. The service will be based on artificial intelligence.

== Entrepreneurial activity ==
ABBYY logo

=== ABBYY ===
In 1989 together with Alexander Moskalev, he founded Bit Software (ABBYY), David Yang is chairman of the board of directors of this company.

In 1998 ABBYY began developing the world's first communicator called Cybiko. The first samples were released for sale in the US in 2000. By the end of 2000, the company had managed to sell over 500 thousand devices. However, the project was soon closed.

For 2008 the company's annual turnover was $80–85 million, according to financial experts. The company's share in the IT market segment in Russia exceeded 95%, in Europe – more than 50%, in the USA – less than 30%.

In 2012, according to IC Finam, ABBYY's revenue amounted to $230–240 million.

In 2013 ABBYY participated in a project that created Gutenberg digital libraries.

As of 2014, ABBYY included 14 companies located in the US, Canada and Japan. The number of employees exceeded 1 250 people. In the same year ABBYY products had sales in 200 countries, and the number of users was more than 40 million people.

In 2016 ABBYY launched the project Findo.io. It helps the user to search for information among personal documents, contacts, mailboxes and social networks.

In 2018 ABBYY collaborated with both companies in the domestic IT market and global companies. ABBYY's partners were more than 400 companies from all over the world, including Samsung, Fujitsu, Epson, Hewlett Packard Enterprise, RICOH, Xerox and others.

Sberbank, VTB, Raiffeisenbank, Alfa-Bank, Tinkoff Bank, Soglasie, Vostokgazprom, SIBUR, MTS, Tele-2, PwC, the Federal Tax Service, the State Duma used ABBYY solutions based on artificial intelligence technology in their work.

In 2022 ABBYY left Russia, starting to position itself as an international company with headquarters in the United States.

=== Fine Reader ===
In 1993 Yang, together with programmer Alexander Moskalev, created the Fine Reader program, which recognizes texts. The company soon entered the global market.

As of 2006, more than 14 million copies of the product were sold per year.

As of 2014, the program had more than 20 million users.

=== Lingvo ===
In 1989 Yang became the developer of the electronic dictionary Lingvo.

For 2014 Lingvo was used by more than 7 million people.

=== Iiko ===
In 2005 David Yang and Maxim Nalsky founded the company Iiko, which creates automation systems for catering enterprises.

In 2013 Iiko was used by 3.8 thousand restaurants in 13 countries around the world.

Now more than 40 thousand restaurants in 17 countries use Iiko in their work.

=== Yva.ai ===
In 2017 David Yang launched the algorithm Yva.ai. This business performance management system is based on the use of artificial intelligence.

== Awards ==
2001 – Laureate of the Russian Government Prize in the field of science and technology

== Personal life ==
David Yang is married and has three children. A supporter of a healthy lifestyle and monitoring nutrition, in 2013 he wrote a book about healthy food called "Now I eat whatever I want!" (Russian: «Теперь я ем все, что хочу!»).
