= Color Line =

Color line may refer to:

- Color line (racism), term for racial segregation in the US
  - Baseball color line, racial exclusion policy in Major and Minor League Baseball until 1947
- Color Line (ferry operator)
- Color Line Arena or Barclays Arena, multipurpose indoor arena in Hamburg, Germany
- Color Line Stadion, football stadium in Ålesund, Norway
- Color Lines, 1992 puzzle video game
