= Ayb Educational Foundation =

Ayb Educational Foundation was founded in 2006 in Armenia. The objective of the foundation is to "shape a culture of excellence in learning" and support the development of Armenian education.

Ayb is actively implementing educational projects across Armenia, Artsakh, and the diaspora, benefiting children and youth. Each year, around 125,000 participants and 1,100 educational institutions in Armenia and Artsakh engage with Ayb's initiatives. The Ayb Educational Foundation has spearheaded several large-scale projects, including the establishment of Ayb School, scholarships for Ayb High School students, the development of Dilijan Central School, the Araratian Baccalaureate program, nationwide school contests, Khan Academy Armenia, AybLabs, and more.

== Structure ==
Ayb was founded in 2006. The founders of Ayb are:

- Ashot Aslanian (Armenia/Russia, founder of Aeorsib Company)
- David Pakhchanian (Armenia/Russia)
- Aram Pakhchanian (Armenia, vice president of ABBYY)
- Karo Sargsyan (Russia, businessman, founder of Spetstorg Company)
- Karen Musaelian (USA, co-founder of Duality Technology Inc.)
- David Yang (Russia, USA, president of ABBYY)
- Matevos Aramian (Armenia, chairman of Vem Radio)
- Oktagon LLC (Armenia, CEO David Saakian)

The supreme governing body of the Ayb Educational Foundation is the Board of Trustees. Members of the board of trustees serve two-year terms.

Aram Pakhchanian is the Chair of the Board of Trustees, and Sona Koshetsyan is the Executive Director of the Ayb Educational Foundation.

== Projects ==
The main programs implemented by the Ayb Educational Foundation are:

- Ayb School (Elementary, Middle and High), operating since 2011. 75% of the students receive full or partial scholarship.
- Dilijan Central School, which belongs to the family of Ayb Schools and is the first school project of Ayb realized by external order and funding.
- Araratian Baccalaureate, which the Ayb Educational Foundation implements in collaboration with the University of Cambridge and University College London Institute of Education.
- Two Fab labs: workshop laboratory created by the Massachusetts Institute of Technology (MIT), equipped with tools and materials.
- Khan Academy Armenia. More than 2,800 Armenian videos on YouTube and 12,000 Armenian articles and exercises.
- Mass school contests – The International Kangaroo Mathematics Contest, Meghu Armenian Language Contest, the Russian Bear International Contest of the Russian Language, All Armenian Tournament of Young Chemists, National Stage of World Robot Olympiad, and Tournament for Chemistry Students in the field of higher education.
- AybLabs, a modern subject laboratories.
- Intensive subject courses.
- Master classes.

== History ==
In February 2006, eight friends met in Moscow and decided to establish Ayb Educational Foundation and Ayb Club. In December, Ayb Educational Foundation was officially established. In the same month, Ayb’s first program, Intensive Subject Courses, was launched. Within the framework of this program, Ayb’s educational methodologies were conceived and tested.

In May 2007, Ayb opened the AybLab at the PhysMath School in Yerevan. As of today, there are eight AybLabs at five schools in four provinces (marzes) in Armenia. In the same year, Ayb made thousands of academic materials of MIT OpenCourseWare publication accessible for applicants, students and professors of 33 HEIs in Armenia, without the need to access the internet.

In May 2008, Ayb conducted the first pilot for the International Kangaroo Mathematics Contest in Armenia. In 2010, two other mass school contests were launched – All Armenian Tournament for Young Chemists and the Russian Bear International Contest of the Russian Language. In 2014, Ayb developed and for the first time implemented Meghu Armenian Language Contest in Armenia and Artsakh. Since 2016, the Ayb Educational Foundation has organized the national stage of school robotics contests – the World Robot Olympiad – in Armenia.

In August 2009, a series of master classes was launched for chemistry teachers of various Armenian schools.

In January 2010, in its first session of the year, the Government of Armenia passed a decree to allocate 6.5 ha land adjacent to the Tbilisi highway in Yerevan to Ayb Educational Foundation for the implementation of the Ayb Learning Hub (Ayb School) project. In October 2011, Ayb High School was opened. The Ayb Educational Foundation provides scholarships to around 75% of the students admitted to Ayb High School.

In July 2013, the Central Bank of Armenia and the Ayb Educational Foundation signed a cooperation agreement on opening a school in Dilijan equipped with Ayb’s educational technologies. In September 2013, the first academic year of the Dilijan Central School started in a temporary location and construction of the main school building was launched. The building was opened in September 2015.

In January 2014, collaborating with the University of Cambridge and University College London Institute of Education, Ayb Educational Foundation started a national educational initiative, the National Program for Educational Excellence (NPEE). Its main instrument, the Araratian Baccalaureate (AB), a globally competitive academic program developed by Ayb, was introduced at Ayb School in September 2015. In May 2016, Ayb School students took first-ever Araratian Baccalaureate exams, which are accredited by the Cambridge International Examinations (CIE) as being equivalent to Cambridge A Levels.

In October 2015, two fablabs (fabrication laboratories designed by MIT) were opened adjunct to the Ayb School in Yerevan and the Dilijan Central School.

In 2017, the Ayb Educational Foundation created Khan Academy Armenia, an online education platform.
