= H8 Family =

Family of microcontrollers

H8
- Bits: 8, 16, 32

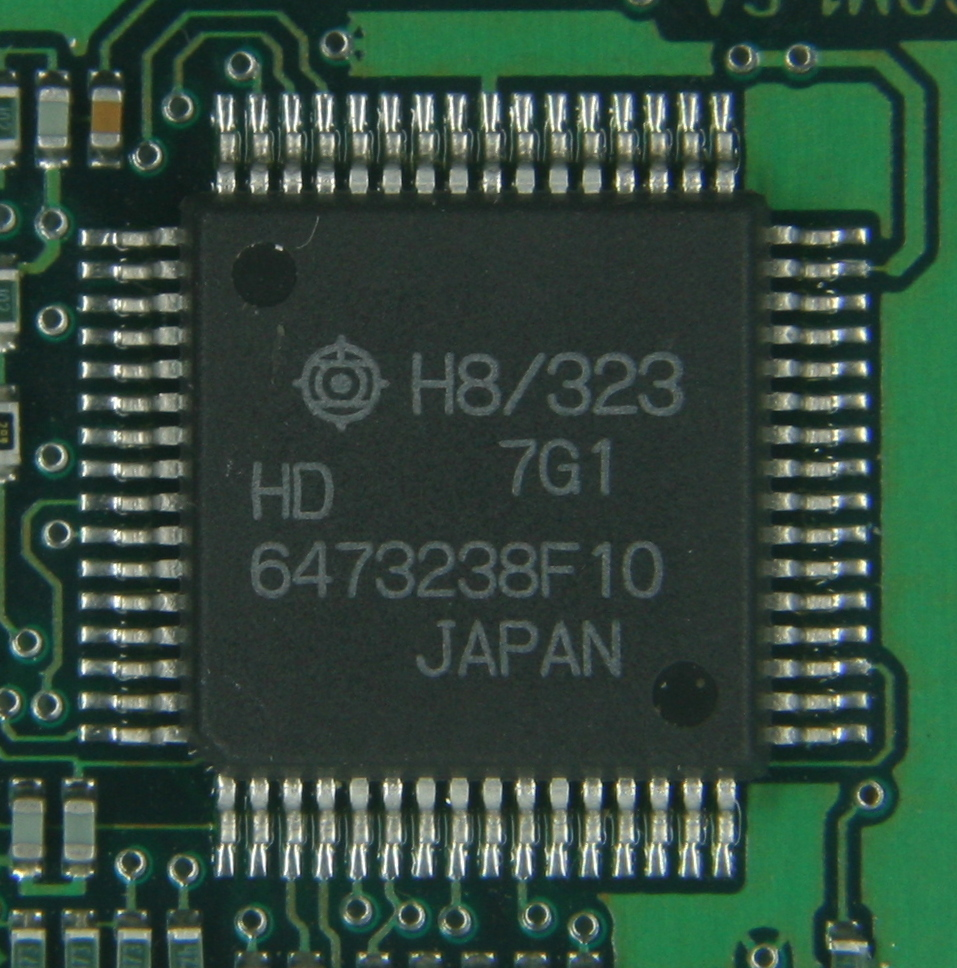
- Hitachi H8/323

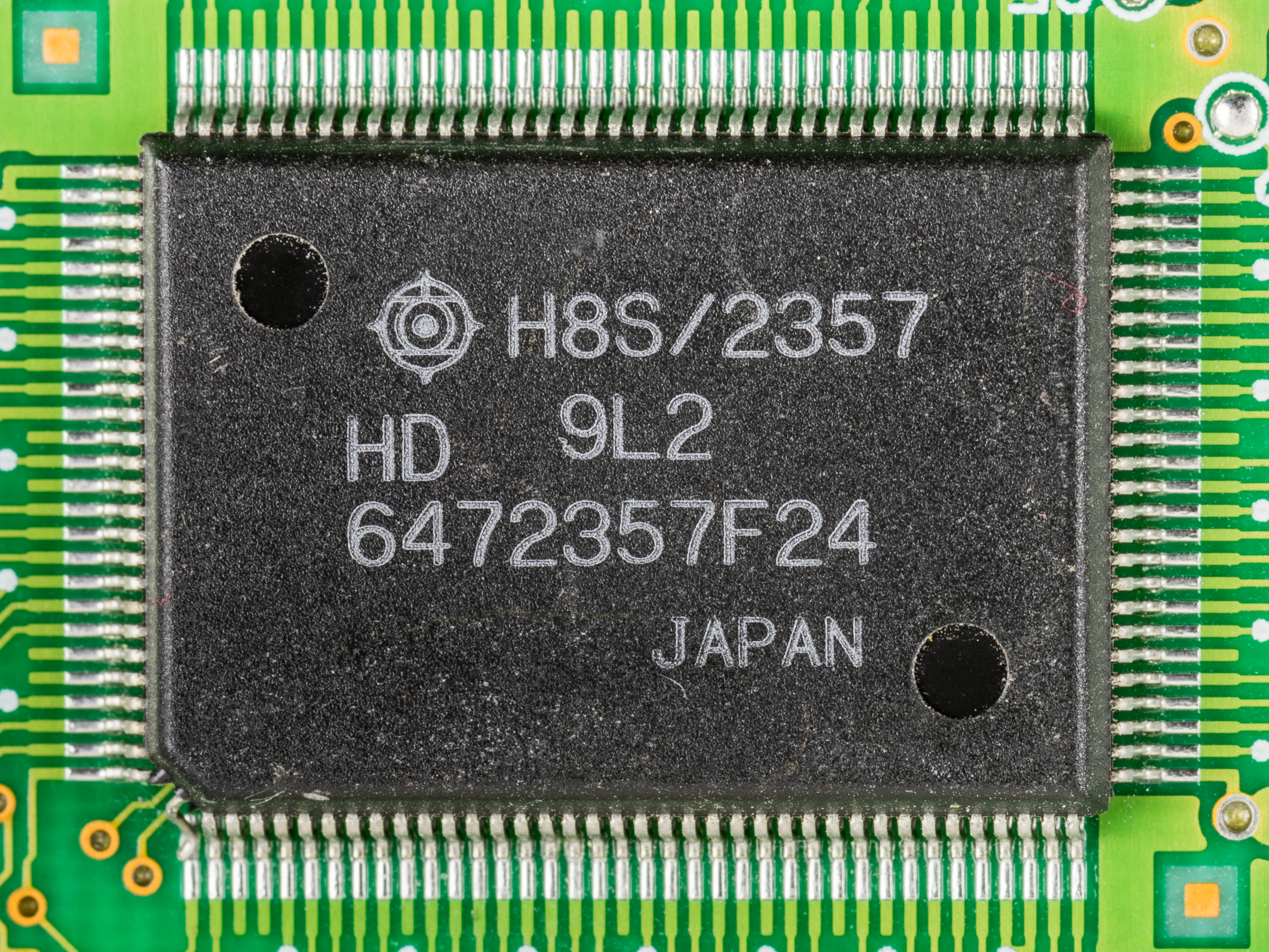
H8S/2357

The Hitachi H8 is a large family of 8-bit, 16-bit and 32-bit microcontrollers made by Renesas Technology, introduced in 1988 by Hitachi Semiconductor. The H8 was Hitachi's own design, replacing the Motorola-architecture chips Hitachi had made under licence. The original design, the H8/300, was an 8-bit processor that had 16-bit registers and ALU which allowed some 16-bit operations. Two upgraded versions were introduced, the H8/300L that expanded the instructions to become a full 16-bit machine while being optimized for low cost, and the H8/300H which further expanded the registers to allow 32-bit operations and was optimized for low-power/high-performance roles. Many variations exist.

== History ==
Hitachi announced the H8 microcontroller family in June 1988. It was Hitachi's own processor design. In October 1986, Hitachi had announced that all its new products would use its own architectures instead of Motorola's. Toshimasa Kihara, a Hitachi microcontroller developer, recalled in 2016:

We decided to go to the ... new architecture, different from the Motorola. It was very tough for us to go to the different architecture. So what we thought that trying to compete against the Motorola architecture in the assembler language level [is not wise strategy]. (Note: Square-bracketed words appear in the Computer History Museum transcript.) Instead, we thought that the ... market have to go to the C language. So we tried to make the good hardware architecture which fits to the C compiler most. And we released those products. We called it H8 Series. And that was a time that the market is going from the assembler to C compiler, I mean the C languages.

Kihara described the H8's instruction set as symmetric and its registers as general-purpose, a design suited to compilers for the C language.

Since 1975, Hitachi and Motorola had cross-licensed patents and made each other's chips under a series of second-source agreements. According to Tsugio Makimoto, a Hitachi semiconductor executive, the partnership broke down in 1986. In January 1989, Motorola sued Hitachi, alleging that the H8 infringed its patents, and Hitachi countersued over Motorola's 68030 microprocessor. The suits, first filed in the federal court in Chicago, were decided together by the federal district court in Austin, Texas. On 29 March 1990, the court ruled that the H8/532 infringed three Motorola patents and was not covered by the companies' 1986 patent licence, and that the 68030 infringed a Hitachi patent. It barred Motorola from selling the 68030 and Hitachi from selling "the H8". Two weeks later, it limited the ban on Hitachi to the H8/532. The companies settled in October 1990.

According to Makimoto, Canon was the first large customer to adopt the H8, using it in cameras as soon as the H8 went on sale. According to Makimoto, monthly H8 production passed one million units in June 1992 and two million in September 1993. Hitachi introduced its first microcontroller with on-chip flash memory, the H8/538F, in 1993, and later made flash versions in the H8/300, H8/300L, H8/300H, H8/500 and H8S series.

GCC added the H8/300 as a target in version 2.4 (May 1993), the H8/300H in version 2.6 (July 1994) and the H8S in version 2.8 (January 1998). Support for the H8SX was contributed in July 2004. As of 2026, the GCC manual documents code-generation options for all four. The Linux kernel supported H8/300H and H8S processors from version 2.5.68 (2003) to version 3.13 (2014), which removed them, and again from version 4.2 (2015) to version 5.19 (2022), which removed them again.

On 1 April 2003, Hitachi transferred its semiconductor operations other than DRAM, including microcontrollers, to Renesas Technology, a new company jointly owned with Mitsubishi Electric. In June 2003, Renesas announced the H8S/2615F, a 16-bit H8S microcontroller for automotive use with a CAN bus interface and on-chip flash memory.

As of 2023, Renesas sold H8 products only to existing customers. An administrator on the Renesas user community boards commented in 2011 that there are no plans for further development of H8 based products. For higher performance needs, Hitachi introduced its SuperH family of 32-bit RISC-like microcontrollers, which have largely replaced the H8.

== Variants ==
Subfamilies include the 8/16-bit H8/300 and H8/500, the 16/32-bit H8/300H and H8S and the 32-bit H8SX series, each with dozens of different variants, varying by speed, selection of built-in peripherals such as timers, interrupts and serial ports, and amounts of ROM, flash memory and RAM. Built-in ROM and flash memory tends to range from 16 KB to 1024 KB, and RAM from 512 B to 512 KB.

Both H8/300H and H8S have eight 32-bit registers, each of which can be treated as one 32-bit register, two 16-bit registers, or two 8-bit registers, with the H8S having an internal 32-bit configuration. Several companies provide compilers for the H8 family, and GCC supports the H8/300, H8/300H, H8S and H8SX. There are also various hardware emulators available.

== Applications ==
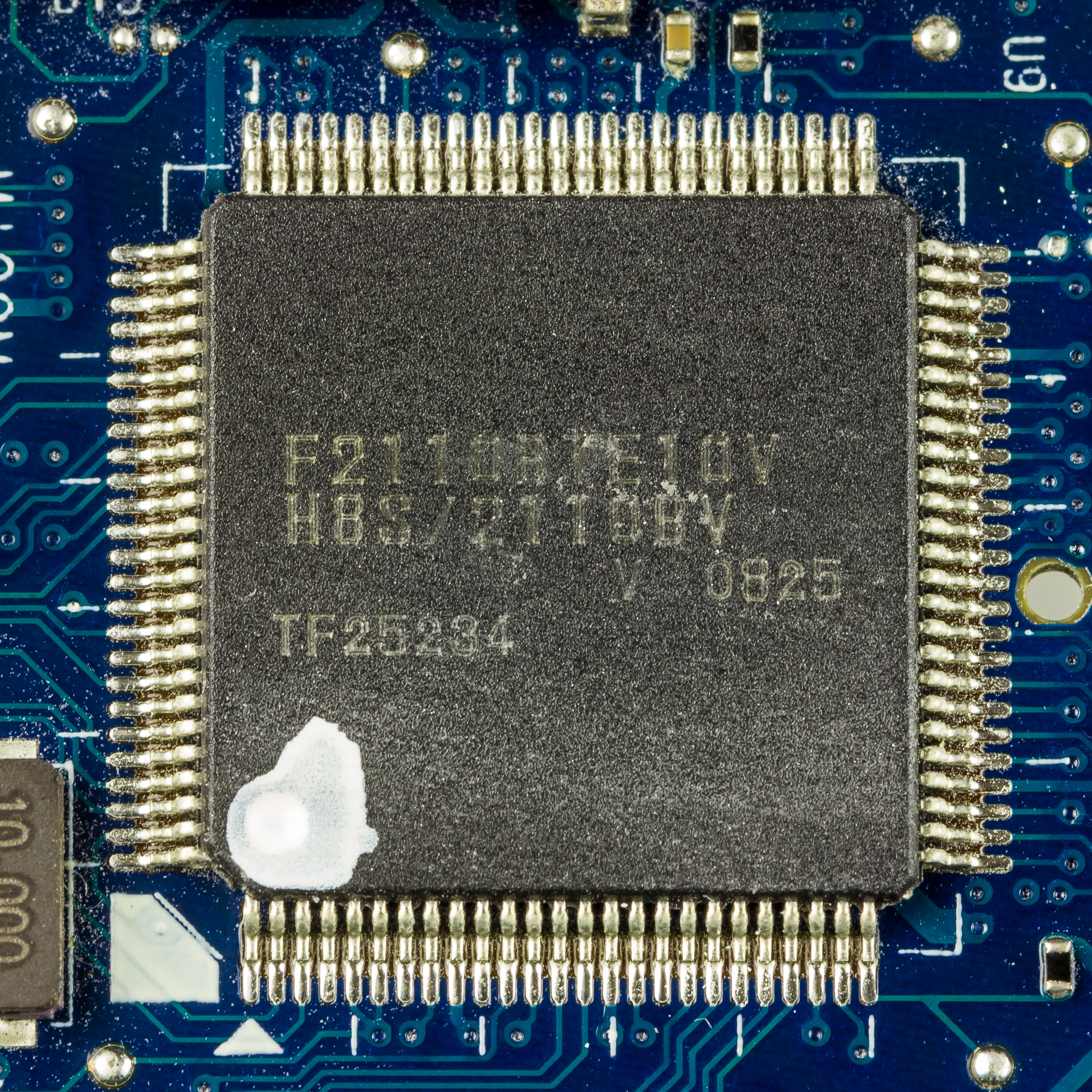
Renesas H8S-2110BV

H8 microcontrollers may be found in digital cameras, the Cybiko handheld computers, some ThinkPad notebooks, printer controllers, smart cards, chess computers, music synthesizers such as the Yamaha FS1R, Roland SC-55 and Roland JV880 and in various automotive subsystems. The LEGO Mindstorms RCX, an advanced robot toy/educational tool, uses the H8/300. An H8/3002 was used as a sound processor by Namco for various games it made in the late 1990s, notably those using its System 12 architecture and by Yamaha for the DB50XG and DB60XG daughterboards and the SW60XG ISA bus sound card.

H8/500 was being also used on a Nokia 2110 phone. According to Makimoto, Nokia, which made 15 million mobile phones a year in 1995, used H8 microcontrollers in almost all of its models.

== Architecture ==
The basic architecture of the H8 is patterned after the DEC PDP-11 architecture, with eight 16-bit registers (the H8/300H and H8S have an additional bank of eight 16-bit registers), and a variety of addressing modes. Unlike the PDP-11 however, the H8 architecture employs big-endian byte ordering.
