= Komitas Avenue =

Avenue in Yerevan, Armenia

Coordinates: 40°12′21″N 44°30′22″E

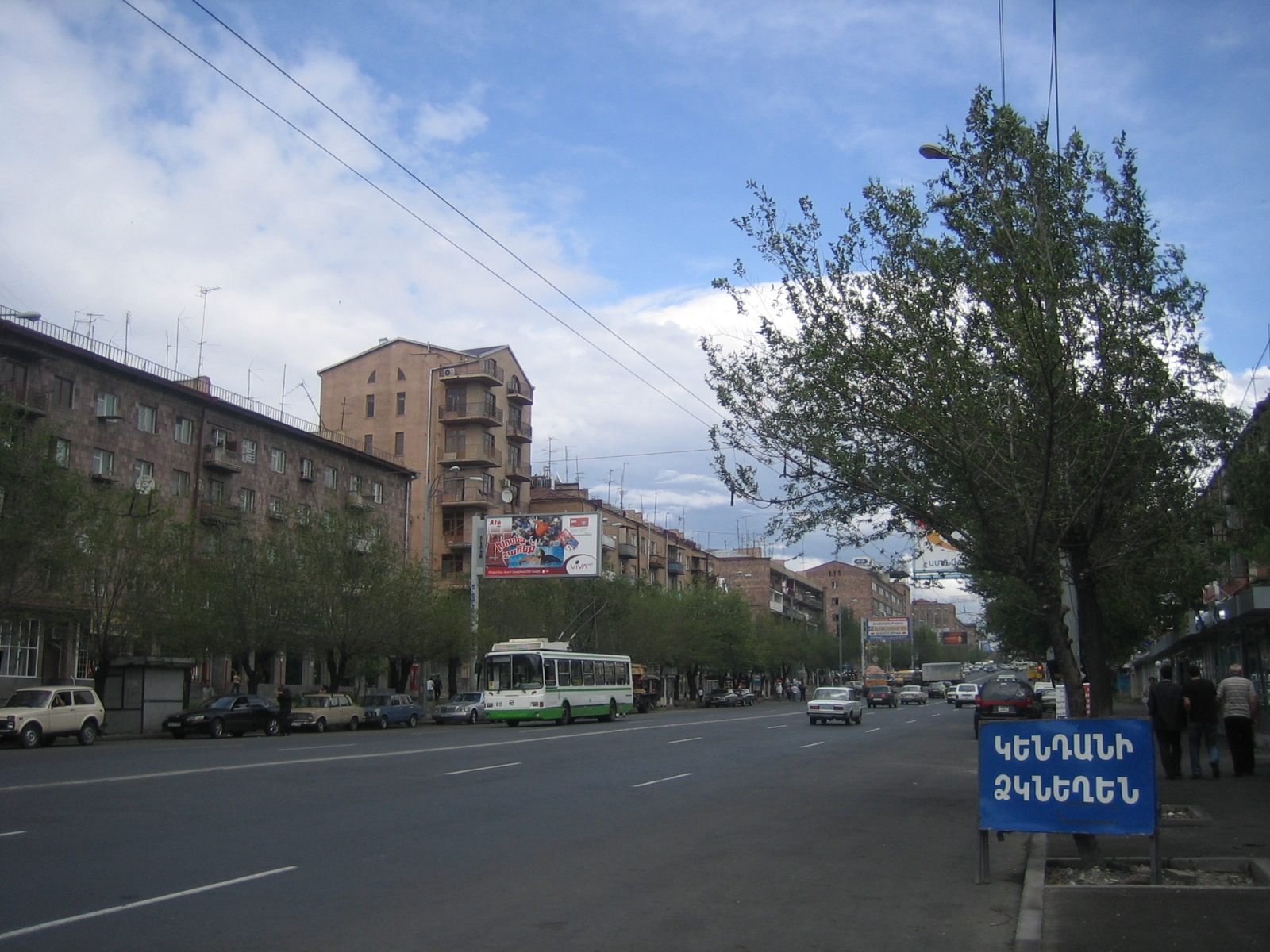
- Komitas Avenue at Arabkir district
- Interactive map of Komitas Avenue
- Native name: Կոմիտասի պողոտա (Armenian)
- Length: 3 km (1.9 mi)
- Location: Arabkir District, Yerevan, Armenia

Construction
- Inauguration: 1938

Komitas Avenue (Armenian: Կոմիտասի պողոտա) is a 3 km-long avenue in the Armenian capital of Yerevan. Named after the prominent Armenian composer Komitas, the avenue is the arterial road of the Arabkir district. The avenue which was opened in 1938, starts with the Mergelyan Institute of Mathematical Machines near Komitas square and ends up with the Lambada bridge junction crossed by the Azatutyan Avenue.

The avenue is mainly home to residential buildings, shopping and service centres, small shops, as well as schools and restaurants.

== Gallery ==
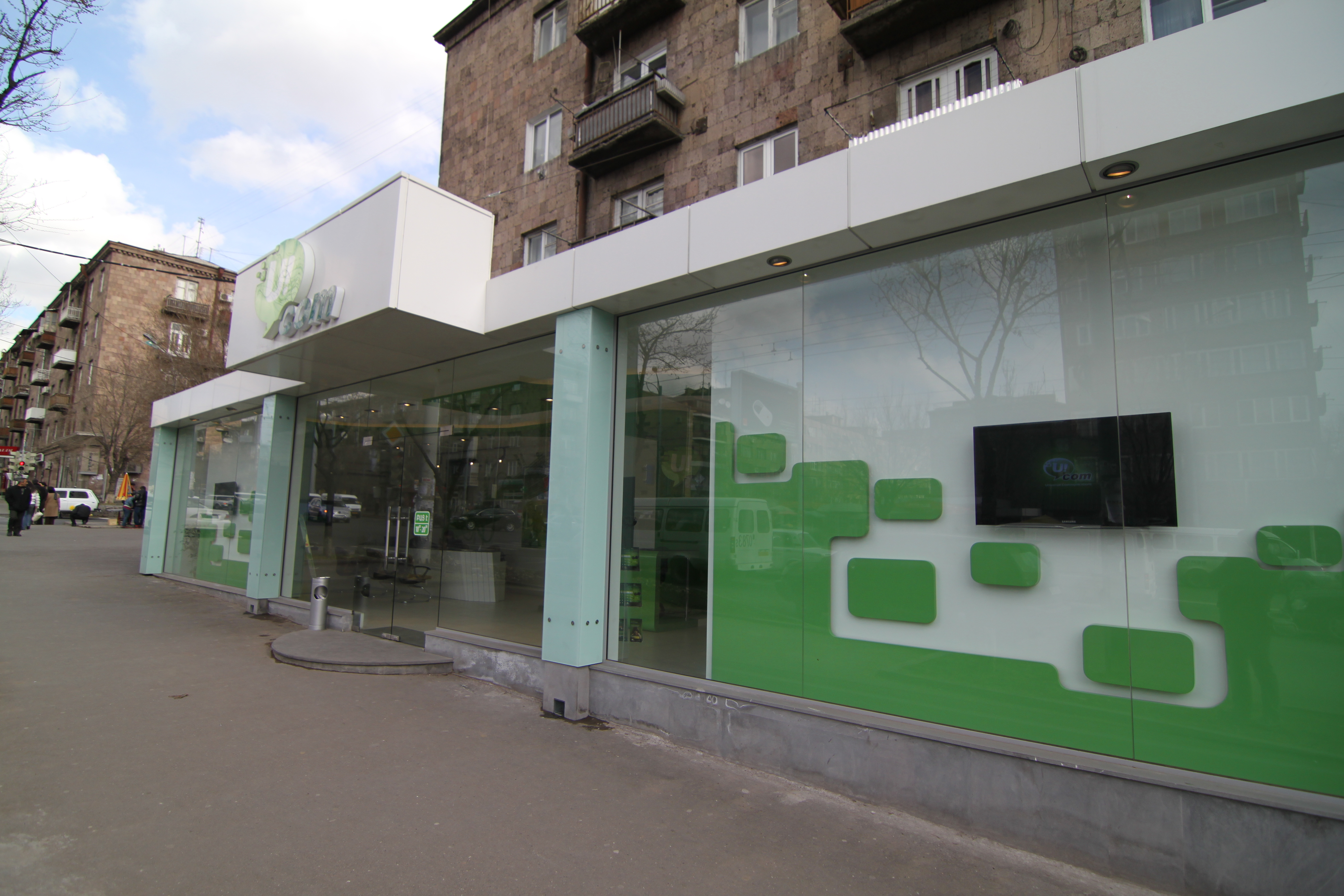
"Ucom" service centre

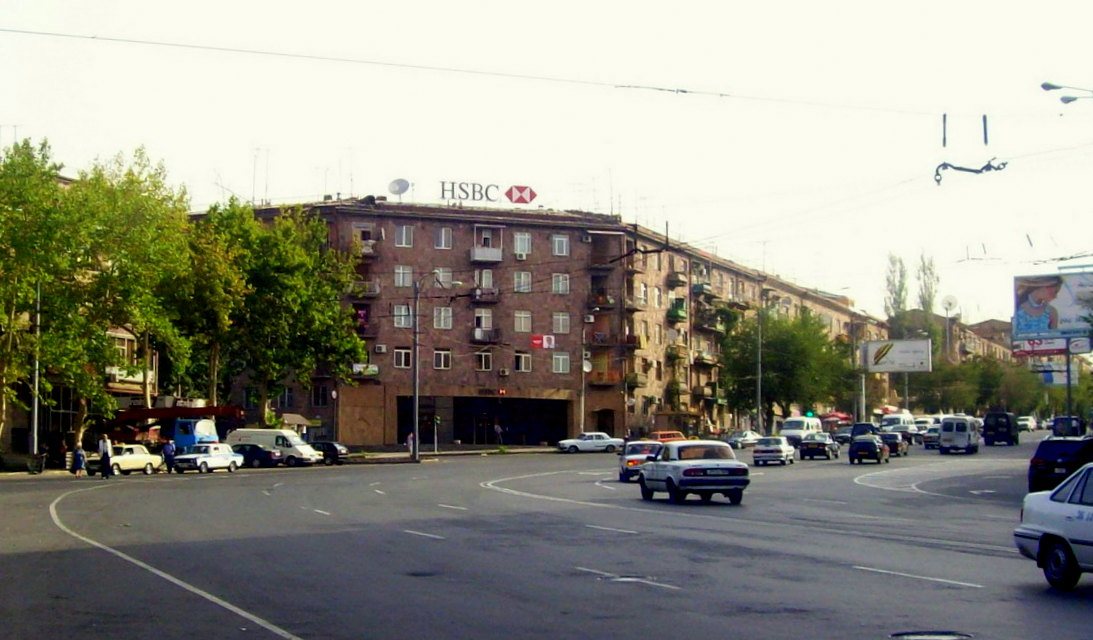
HSBC bank on the avenue

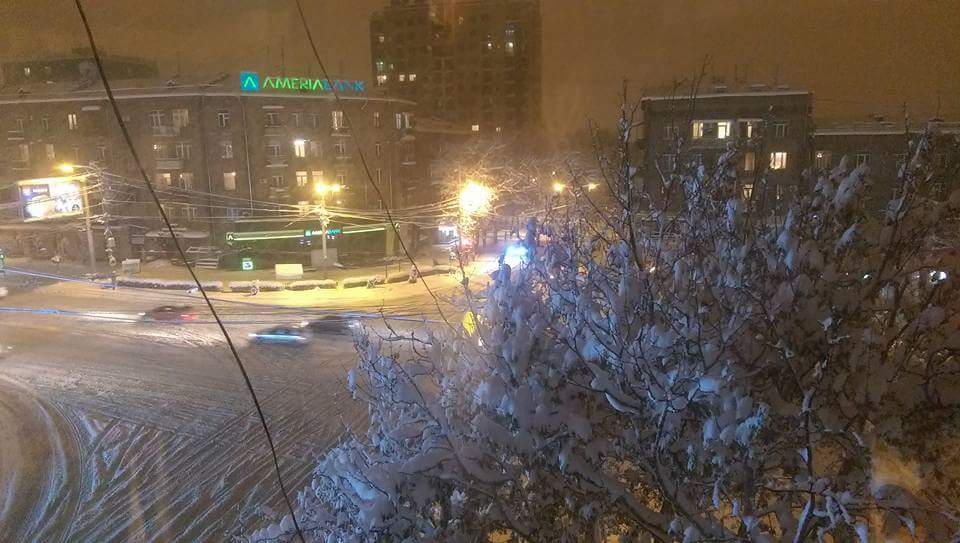
Komitas-Gyulbenkian intersection
