= Rusal Armenal =

Coordinates: 40°12′55.98″N 44°30′42.80″E

- Company type: Subsidiary
- Headquarters: Arabkir, Yerevan, Armenia
- Parent: Rusal

Rusal Armenal is a wholly owned subsidiary of Rusal which runs an aluminum foil mill in the Arabkir district of Yerevan, Armenia. The premises of the mill was formerly known as the Kanaker aluminum smelter, which was commissioned in 1950, and became one of the largest aluminum foil mills in the Soviet Union and Europe in the 1980s.
