= Arabkir District =

District in Yerevan, Armenia

Coordinates: 40°12′28″N 44°30′21″E

Arabkir Արաբկիր
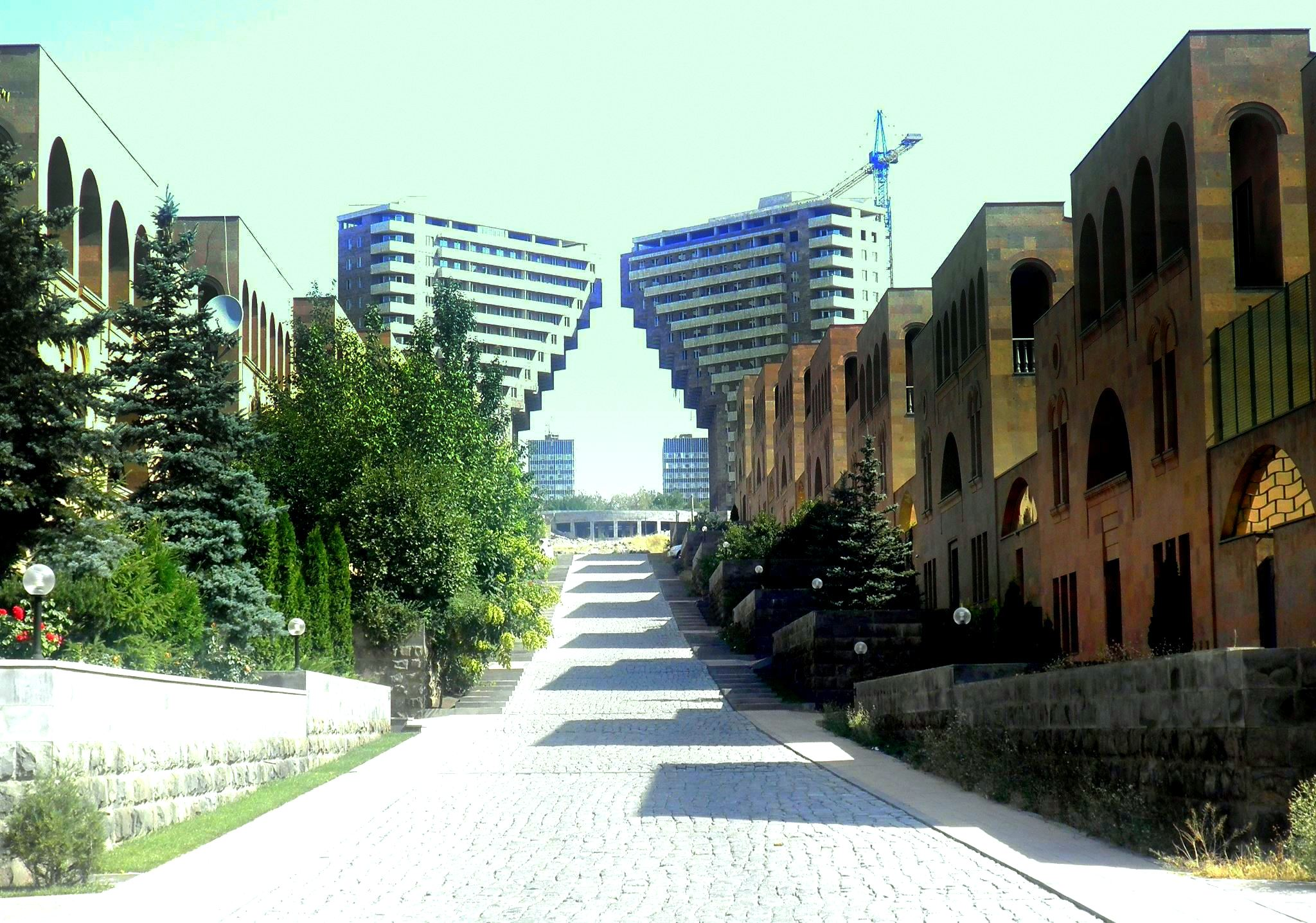
- The Northern Ray residential area at the Arabkir district

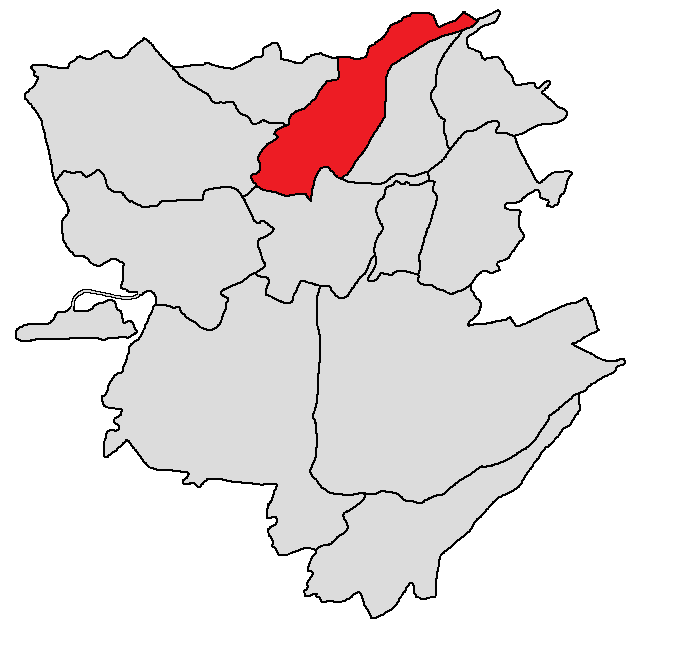
- Arabkir district shown in red

- Location within Armenia
- Country: Armenia
- Marz (Province): Yerevan

Government
  - Mayor of District: Aram Danielyan

Area
  - Total: 13.29 km^{2} (5.13 sq mi)
- Elevation: 1,150 m (3,770 ft)

Population (2022 census)
  - Total: 118,870
  - Density: 8,944/km^{2} (23,170/sq mi)
- Time zone: UTC+4 (AMT)

Arabkir (Armenian: Արաբկիր վարչական շրջան, romanized: Arabkir varch’akan shrjan), is one of the 12 districts of Yerevan, the capital of Armenia. Located to the north of the city centre, Arabkir is bordered by the Davtashen District from the northwest, Ajapnyak District from the west, Kentron District from the south, and Kanaker-Zeytun District from the east. Hrazdan River forms the natural border of the district from the north and the west. At the north, Arabkir has common borders with the community of Kanakeravan of Kotayk Province.

== Overview ==
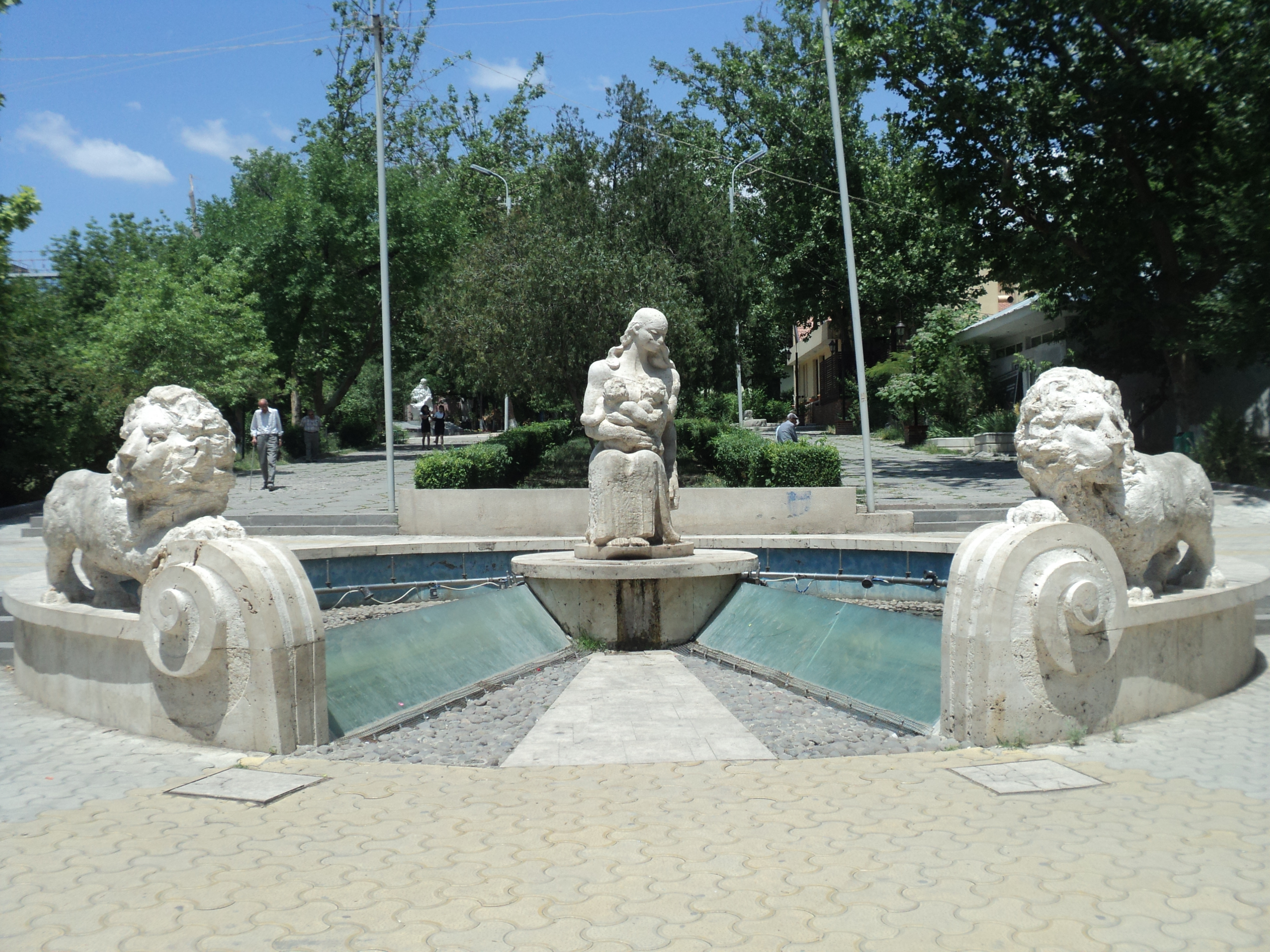
The sculpture of Tsovinar at the Vahagn Davtyan park

With an area of 12 km^{2} (5.38% of Yerevan city area), Arabkir is the 8th-largest district of Yerevan in terms of area. It is unofficially divided into smaller neighborhoods such as Nor Arabkir, Mergelyan, Aygedzor, Kanaker Hydropower Plant and Raykom. Arabkir's main thoroughfare is the Komitas Avenue, while the streets of Kievyan, N. Zarian, Hrachya Kochar, Mamikonian, Al. Griboyedov, A. Khachaturian, V. Vagharshyan, V. Papazian, and N. Adontz are among the notable ones. The two main squares of the district are Barekamutyun and Mher Mkrtchyan. Arabkir is separated from Kanaker-Zeytun by the Liberty Avenue (Armenian: Ազատության Պողոտա) and Tbilisi Highway.

Arabkir is mainly a commercial district with many retail shops, shopping and service centres. However, a large industrial district was formed at the northern part during the Soviet period. The majority of the residents of the district are middle class.

The district has many parks with the most notable ones are Vahagn Davtyan Park and Nor Arabkir Park.

As of 2016, the population of the district is around 115,800.

== Climate ==
Climate data for Arabkir, Yerevan(1991-2020, extremes 1981-2020)
| Month | Jan | Feb | Mar | Apr | May | Jun | Jul | Aug | Sep | Oct | Nov | Dec | Year |
|---|---|---|---|---|---|---|---|---|---|---|---|---|---|
| Record high °C (°F) | 13.5 (56.3) | 18.6 (65.5) | 25.3 (77.5) | 33.0 (91.4) | 34.1 (93.4) | 38.4 (101.1) | 41.0 (105.8) | 41.9 (107.4) | 38.0 (100.4) | 30.5 (86.9) | 23.5 (74.3) | 21.4 (70.5) | 41.9 (107.4) |
| Daily mean °C (°F) | −2.4 (27.7) | 0.5 (32.9) | 6.6 (43.9) | 12.3 (54.1) | 17.0 (62.6) | 22.2 (72.0) | 25.6 (78.1) | 25.7 (78.3) | 21.2 (70.2) | 14.5 (58.1) | 6.7 (44.1) | 0.2 (32.4) | 12.5 (54.5) |
| Record low °C (°F) | −18.3 (−0.9) | −18.1 (−0.6) | −16.4 (2.5) | −8.3 (17.1) | 1.1 (34.0) | 5.0 (41.0) | 7.3 (45.1) | 8.6 (47.5) | 2.6 (36.7) | −0.5 (31.1) | −9.8 (14.4) | −20.0 (−4.0) | −20.0 (−4.0) |
| Average precipitation mm (inches) | 27.9 (1.10) | 26.9 (1.06) | 35.3 (1.39) | 53.5 (2.11) | 51.6 (2.03) | 22.8 (0.90) | 19.2 (0.76) | 8.1 (0.32) | 13.6 (0.54) | 27.2 (1.07) | 28.6 (1.13) | 25.9 (1.02) | 340.6 (13.43) |
| Average precipitation days (≥ 1 mm) | 5.5 | 4.8 | 6.3 | 8.7 | 8.8 | 4.9 | 2.8 | 1.9 | 2.4 | 4.5 | 4.7 | 6 | 61.3 |
| Average relative humidity (%) | 77.8 | 69.8 | 60.3 | 58.9 | 59.2 | 52.6 | 51.7 | 51.1 | 53.6 | 62.3 | 69.4 | 79 | 62.1 |
Source: NOAA

== History ==
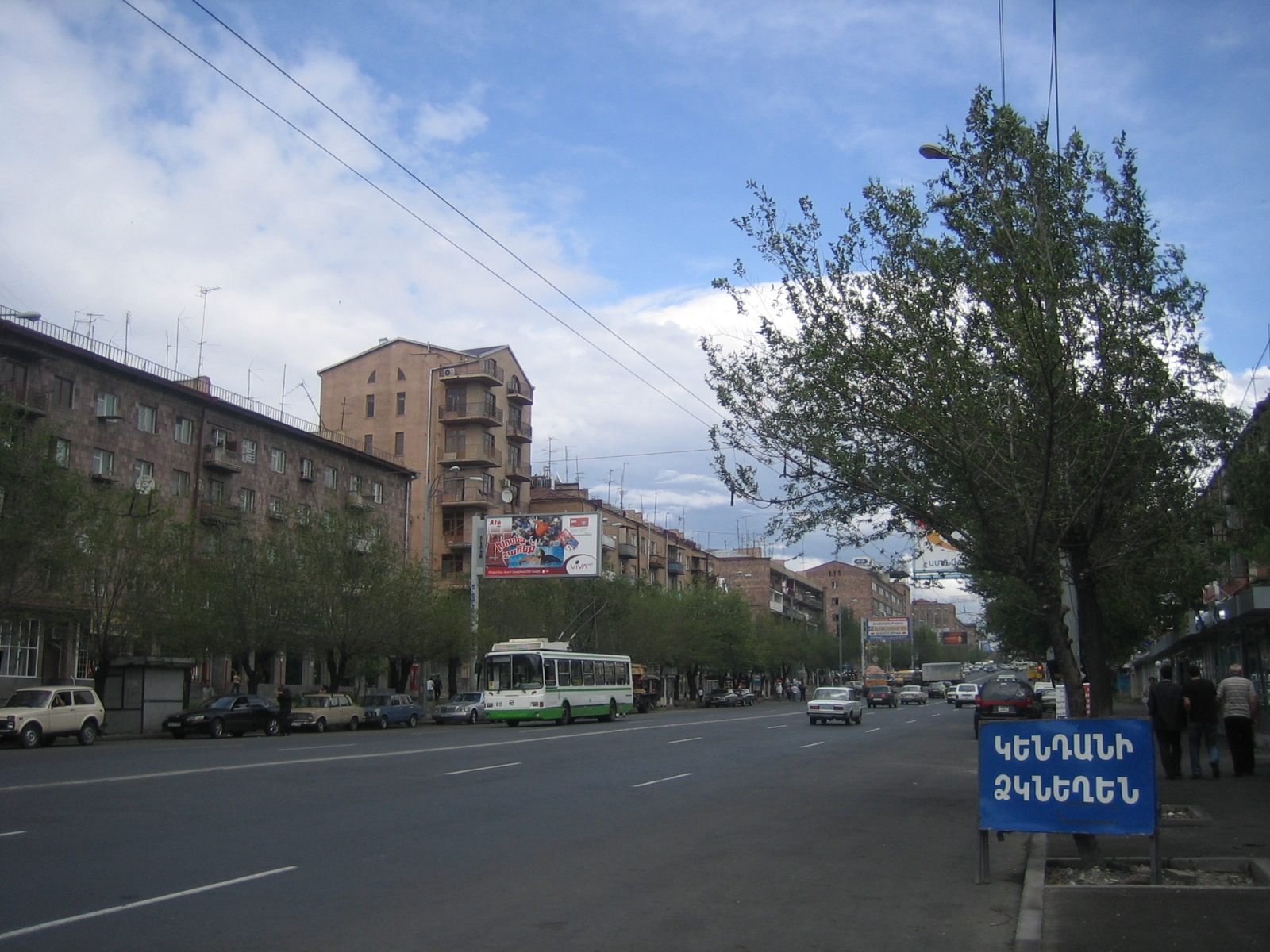
Komitas Avenue

On the eve of World War I, there were about 9,523 Armenians (1,300 houses) and 6,774 Turks living in the town of Arapgir near Malatya (modern-day Turkey). After the 1915 Armenian genocide, most of the Armenian population of Arapgir was either killed or deported. Starting in 1922, surviving Armenians of Arapgir found refuge in Soviet Armenia. Consequently, the Arabkir District was officially founded as a settlement north of the Yerevan city centre on November 29, 1925.

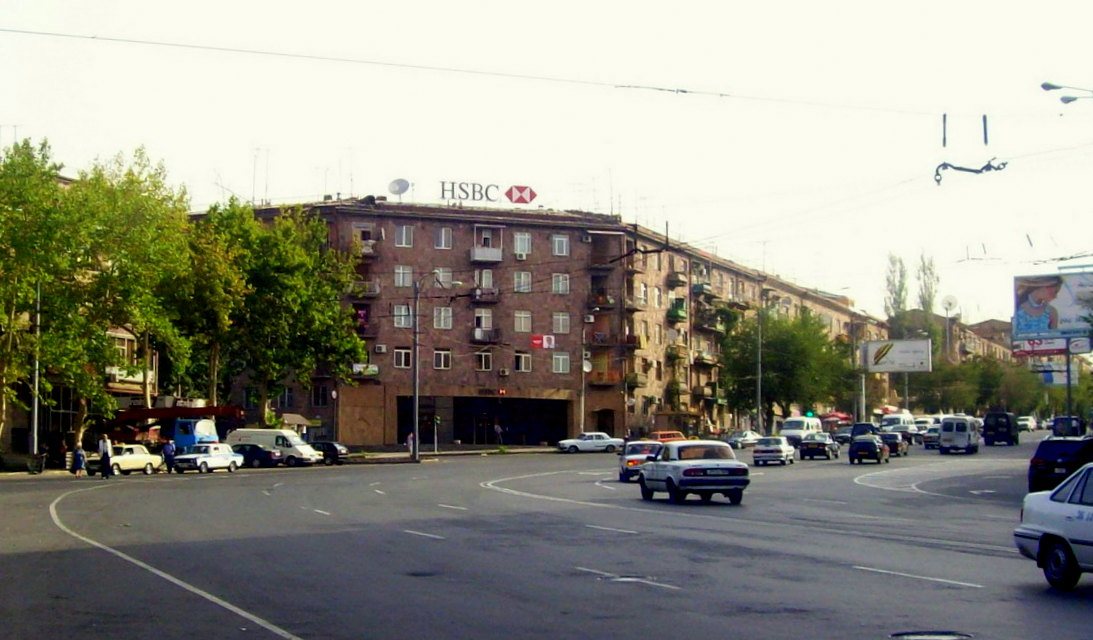
HSBC Bank Armenia, Komitas branch in Arabkir

Their original cemetery was located at the north end of the district near the street of the Molokan community. However, the cemetery was converted into a park around 1963 and the gravestones were removed. Only a handful of graves remain in the wooded areas of the park, as well as a memorial to soldiers from the Arabkir District who were killed in World War II.

Many large industrial plants of Armenia were opened in Arabkir during the Soviet period. However, after the collapse of the Soviet Union, most of the plants were abandoned. The site of ErAZ automobile factory is under development to become a residential neighbourhood.

== Demographics ==
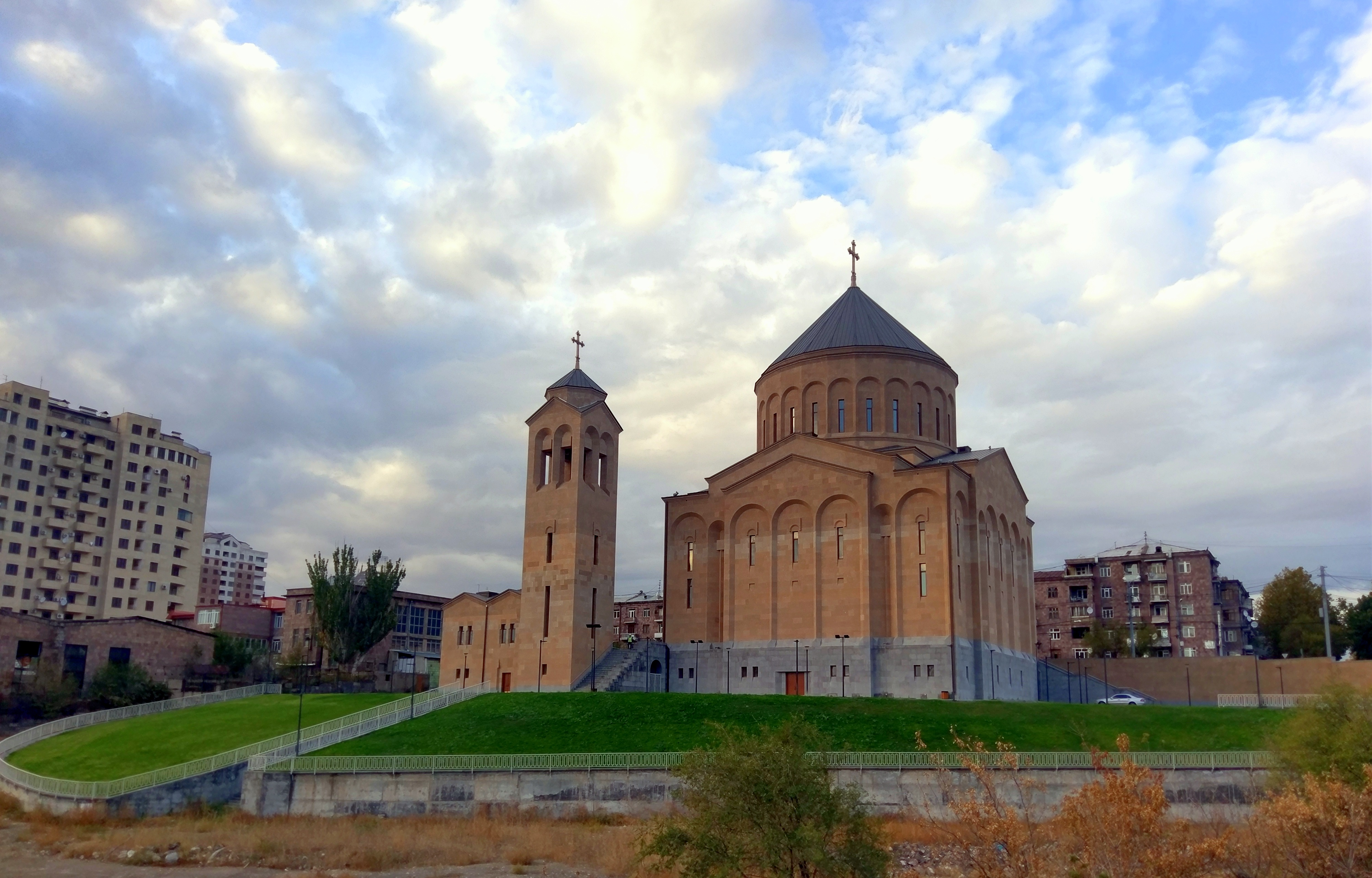
Church of the Holy Cross

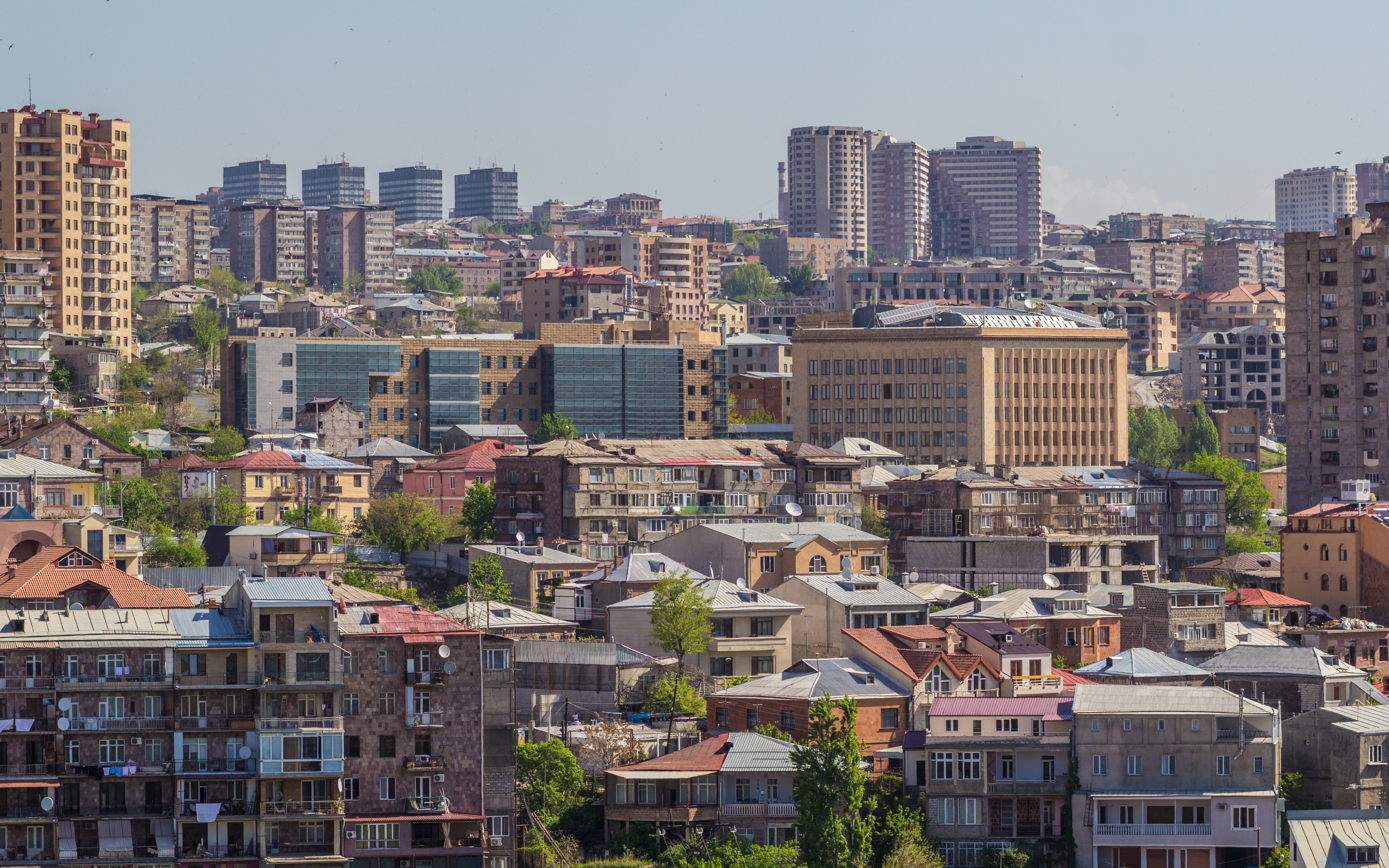
The AUA buildings and their neighbourhood

Arabkir is one of the most densely populated districts in Yerevan. As of the 2022 census, the district had a population of 118,870, which is 10.94% of Yerevan city population and ranked 6th among the Yerevan districts.

Arabkir is mainly populated by Armenians who belong to the Armenian Apostolic Church. In 2018, the Holy Cross Church of Arabkir was opened. Another church known as the Holy Translators is due to open in 2020.

Arabkir has community of 5 congregations of Spiritual Christian Dukh-i-zhizniki (map of meeting houses), a religious community of Russian origin. Many moved in from the northern regions of Armenia, and settled in different neighborhoods throughout Yerevan, mainly in Arabkir. There is a park there misnamed "Molokan Park" (because they Russians misunderstand their own history), which had been privatized before Armenia's 2018 revolution, but has since been returned to the city. A congregation of Spiritual Christian Molokane from Russia was in Nor Nork district.

== Culture ==
Arabkir has many public libraries including the Fundamental Scientific Library of the Armenian National Academy of Sciences (1943), Library No. 5 (1950), Scientific and Technical Library of the National Center of Innovation and Entrepreneurship (1963), Library No. 6 (1976), and Avetik Isahakyan Central Library branches No. 29 (1951), No. 33 for children (1947), and No. 36 (1958).

The Konstantin Sarajyan Music School and Alexey Hekimyan Music School are operating in the district since 1952 and 1982 respectively.

=== Museums ===
- Hovhannes Karapetyan Geological Museum (1937)
- Medicine History Museum of Armenia (1978)
- Galentz Museum (2010)
- Little Einstein Interactive Science Museum (2016)

== Transportation ==
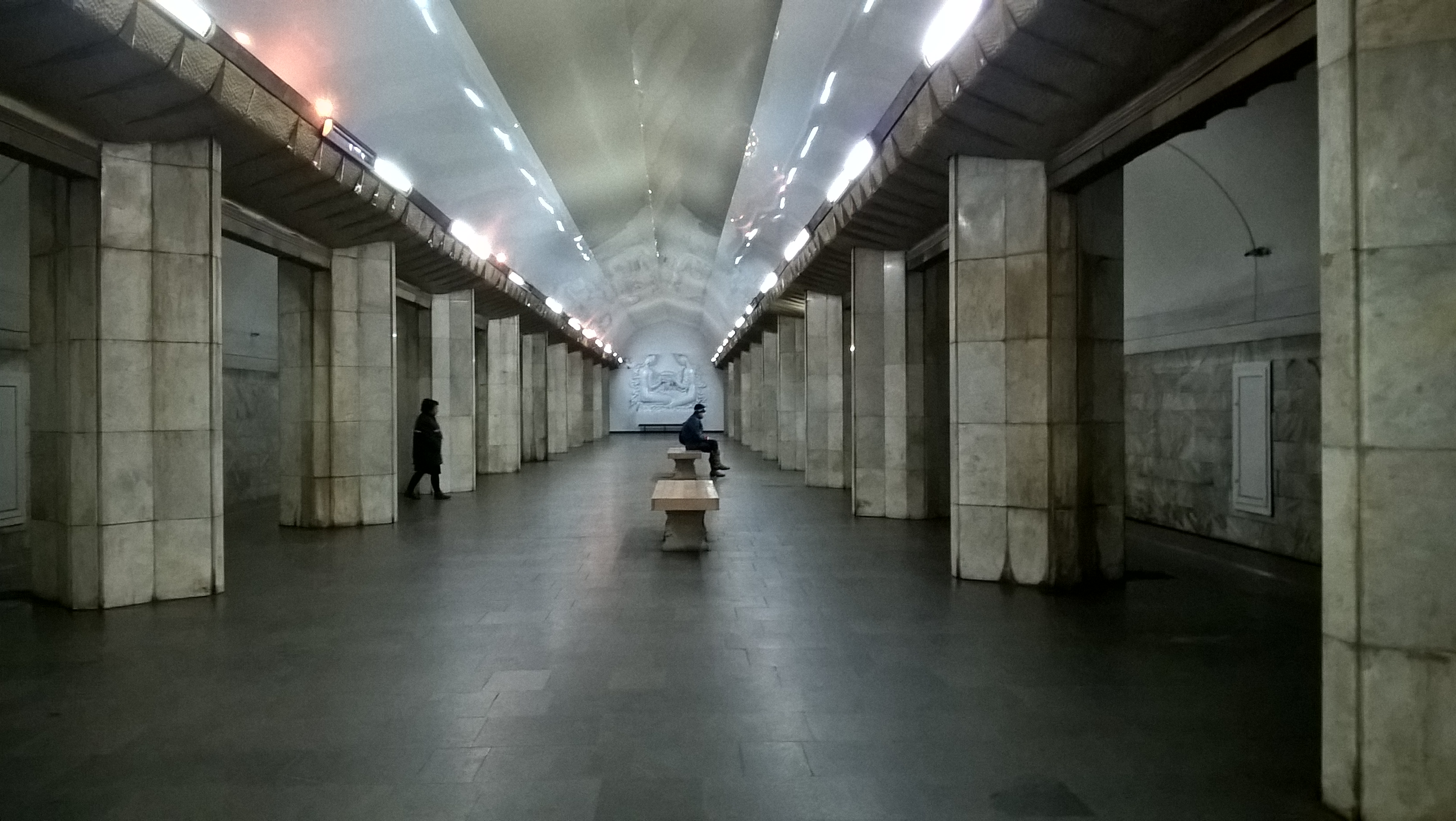
Barekamutyun underground station

The district is connected with the rest of Yerevan city mainly through the Komitas Avenue, Kiev Street and the Barekamutyun ('Friendship') metro station.

Arabkir District is also served by a public transport network of buses and trolleybuses. As of 2006 the district had:

- 40 hectares (99 acres) of streets and roads
- 553 hectares (1366 acres) of buildings, squares and yards
- 385 hectares (951 acres) of others areas

== Economy ==
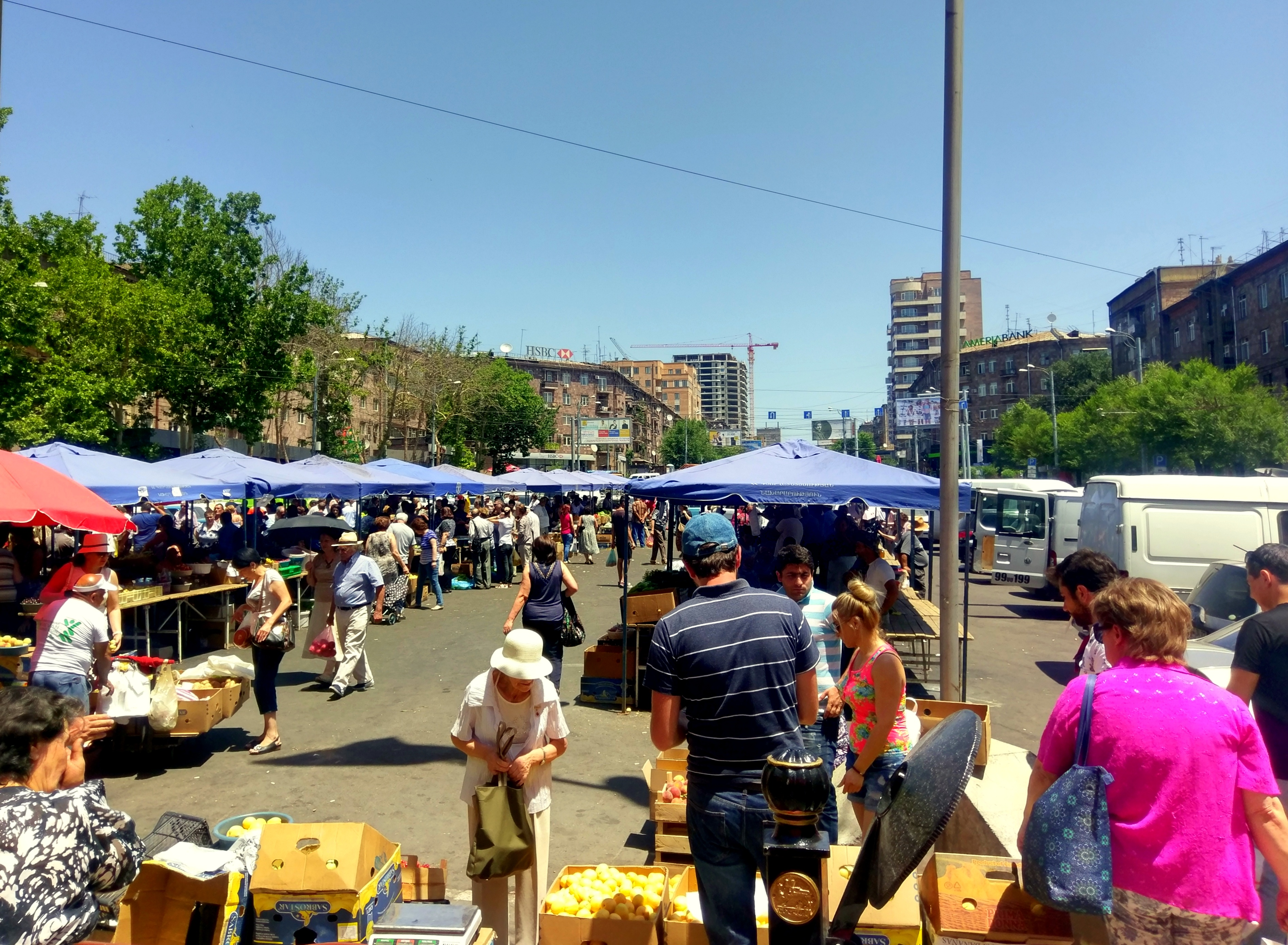
Weekly farmers' market in Arabkir

=== Industry ===
Currently, Arabkir is mainly a commercial centre within Yerevan. However, many large industrial plants were opened during the Soviet period at the north of district, forming a quite large industrial area. Kanaker Hydroelectric Power Station of the Sevan–Hrazdan Cascade was opened in the area in 1936. In 1943, the Yerevan Watch Factory (currently inactive) was opened, followed by the Precision Instruments Factory (currently abandoned) in 1946. The Kanaker aluminum smelter (known as Rusal Armenal since 2000) was opened in 1950. Later in 1964, the currently-defunct ErAZ automobile factory was opened, followed by the Yerevan Electrical Lamps Factory in 1966 (known as Grand Sun since 2000). In 1967, Urartu manufacturing plant for bread and bakery products was opened.

After Armenia gained its independence, many new firms were opened in Arabkir such as the Elnor butter factory in 2000, Rassi footwear factory in 2002, Sapironi lemonade factory in 2008, Goldshin roof manufacturing plant in 2009, and Litokol plant for building materials in 2009.

=== Services ===
Many large commercial centres and retailers are operating in Arabkir. Komitas Avenue and its intersections are home to many retail shops. The Yerevan City hypermarket is the largest shopping centre in the district. Another shopping mall is currently under construction in Arabkir. The Yerevan Expo exhibition centre is located within the Mergelyan centre in Arabkir.

The district is also home to many medical centres such as Arabkir Infant Medical Centre, Institute of Sergery Mickaelyan, Arabkir Joint Medical Center, SlavMed Medical Center, and the Russian Military Hospital.

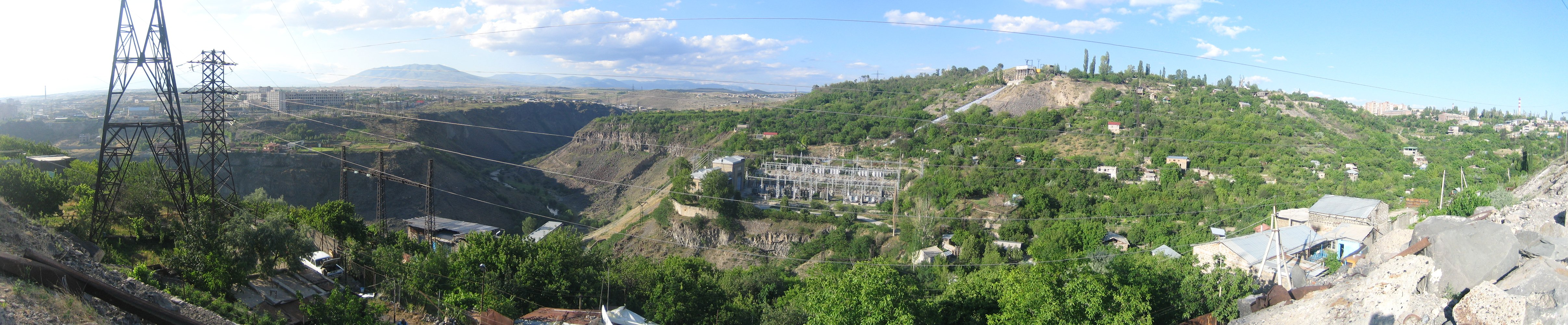
Panorama of gorge and hydroelectric power plant along the Hrazdan River in Arabkir

== Education ==
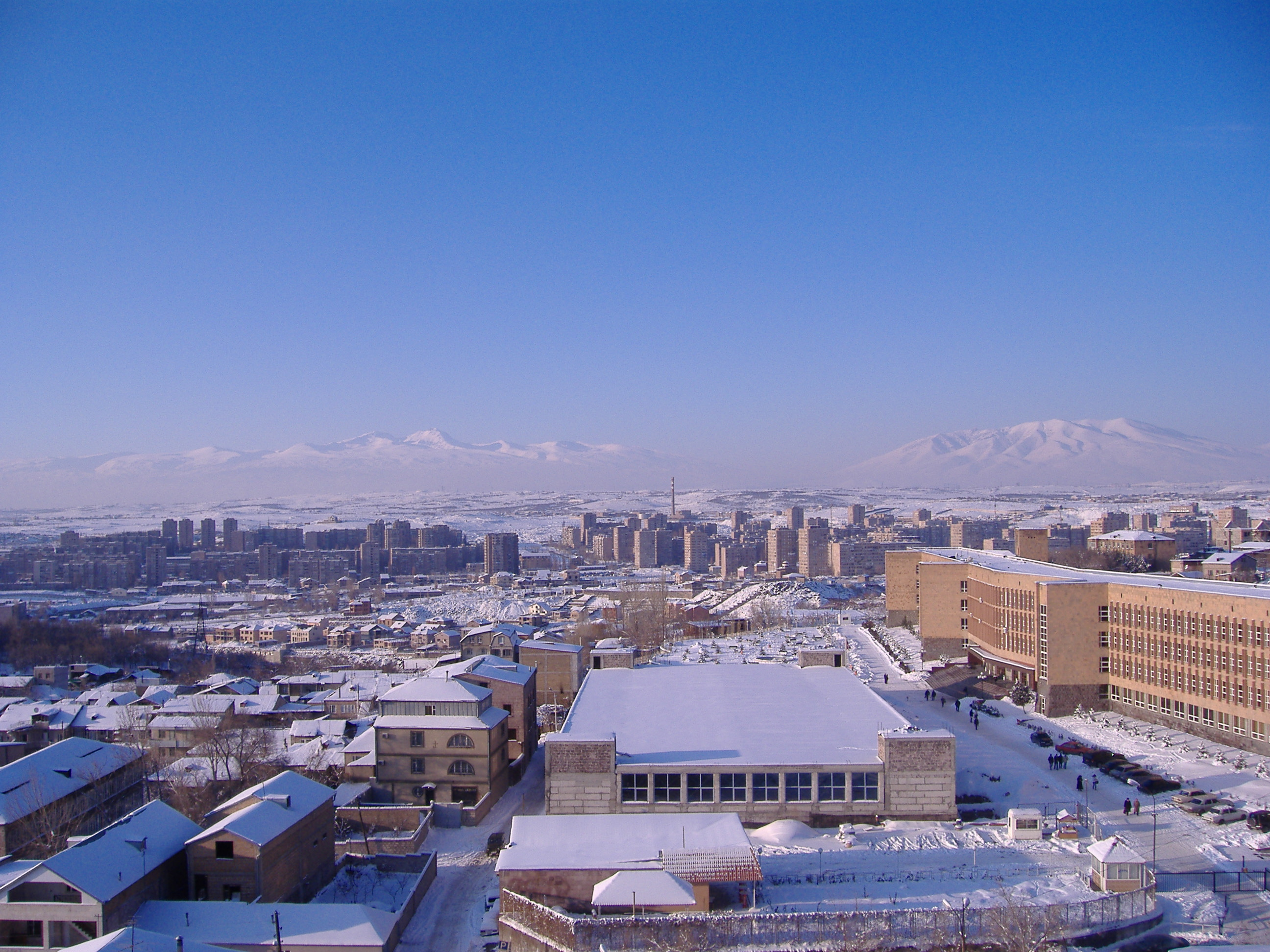
The Russian-Armenian (Slavonic) University in Arabkir

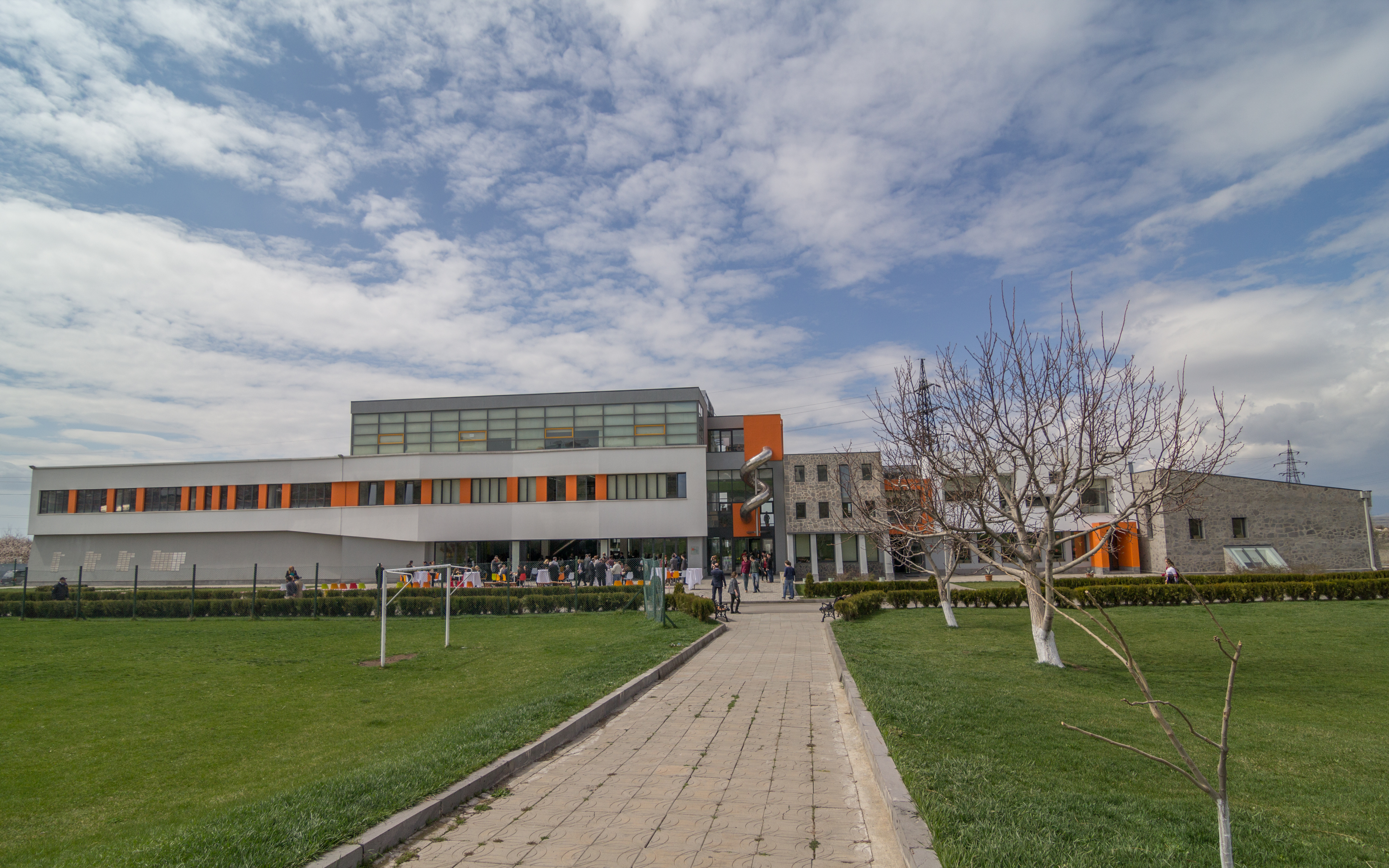
Ayb School

As of 2016–17, the district has 21 public education schools as well as 6 private schools, among them is the prominent Ayb School. 2 vocational schools are also operating in the district.

Many higher education institutes are operating in the district, including:

- American University of Armenia,
- Russian-Armenian (Slavonic) University,
- Yerevan University of Management,
- Yerevan Computer Research and Development Institute.

The Yerevan State Humanitarian College founded in 1881, is among the oldest research and education institutions in modern Armenia. It is currently headquartered in Arabkir.

== Sport ==
Arabkir is home to the following sport schools:

- Children's and Youth's sport school of sport games of Arabkir, opened in 1954, specialized in basketball, volleyball, football and chess.
- Children's and Youth's complex sport school of Arabkir, opened in 1970, specialized in basketball, football, volleyball, boxing, table tennis, karate, taekwondo and artistic gymnastics.
- Yerevan Children's and Youth's complex sport school, opened in 1984, specialized in Olympic wrestling, table tennis, chess, taekwondo, football and sport dances.
- Children's and Youth's single combat sport school of Arabkir, opened in 1985, specialized in judo, sambo, and Olympic wrestling.
- Yerevan sport committee, founded in 2010.
- Children's and Youth's chess school of Arabkir, opened in 2015.

A branch of Gold's Gym is also operating in Arabkir since 2004.

== International relations ==
The administration of Arabkir District made a number of official cooperation agreements with many European mayoralties including:

- Le Plessis-Robinson, Paris, France, since 2005.
- Central District, Riga, Latvia, since 2006.
- Deurne, Antwerp, Belgium, since 2006.
- Şişli, Istanbul, Turkey, since 2006.

== Panoramic view ==
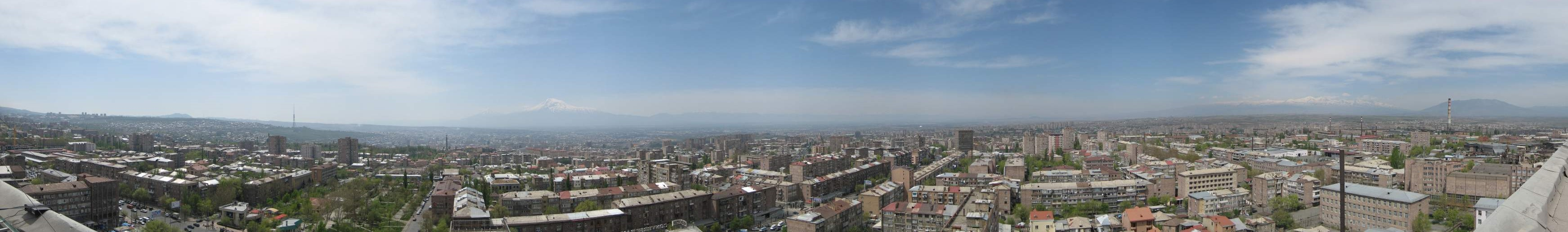
Panorama of Arabkir district

== See also ==
- Arabgir, Malatya Province, Turkey
