= ABBYY FineReader =

Optical character recognition application

FineReader PDF
- Developer: ABBYY
- Release: July 1993; 33 years ago
- Stable release: 16.0.14.7295 / 3 August 2023; 3 years ago
- Operating system: Windows, macOS, Linux
- Type: OCR
- License: Commercial proprietary software (Retail or volume licensing)
- Website: pdf.abbyy.com

ABBYY FineReader PDF is an optical character recognition (OCR) application developed by ABBYY. First released in 1993, the program runs on Microsoft Windows (Windows 7 or later) and Apple macOS (10.12 Sierra or later). Since v15, the Windows version can also edit PDF files.

Users can use the program to convert image documents (photos, scans, PDF files) and screen captures into editable file formats, including Microsoft Word, Microsoft Excel, Microsoft PowerPoint, Rich Text Format, HTML, PDF/A, searchable PDF, CSV and txt (plain text) files. Since Version 11, files can be saved in the DjVu format. Since Version 15, the program recognizes text in 192 languages and has a built-in spell check for 48 of them.

FineReader recognizes new characters in several ways. Users can train the app on characters, adding them to the recognition alphabet. Users can select characters from a list and add them to the alphabet of a selected language (for example, adding certain Icelandic characters to a German alphabet for a German text describing Iceland). Finally, users can add domain-specific vocabulary to the FineReader’s built-in lexicon.

The program also enables users to compare documents, add annotations and comments, and schedule batch processing.

As of 2015, there were more than 20 million users of ABBYY FineReader worldwide. ABBYY licenses the embedded OCR technology to various companies including Fujitsu, Panasonic, Xerox, Plustek, and Samsung.

In February 2020, version 15 of the software was rated "Highest-quality OCR on the market" by PC Magazine.
