= Ayb School =

Coordinates: 40°13′27″N 44°31′42″E

- Այբ դպրոց

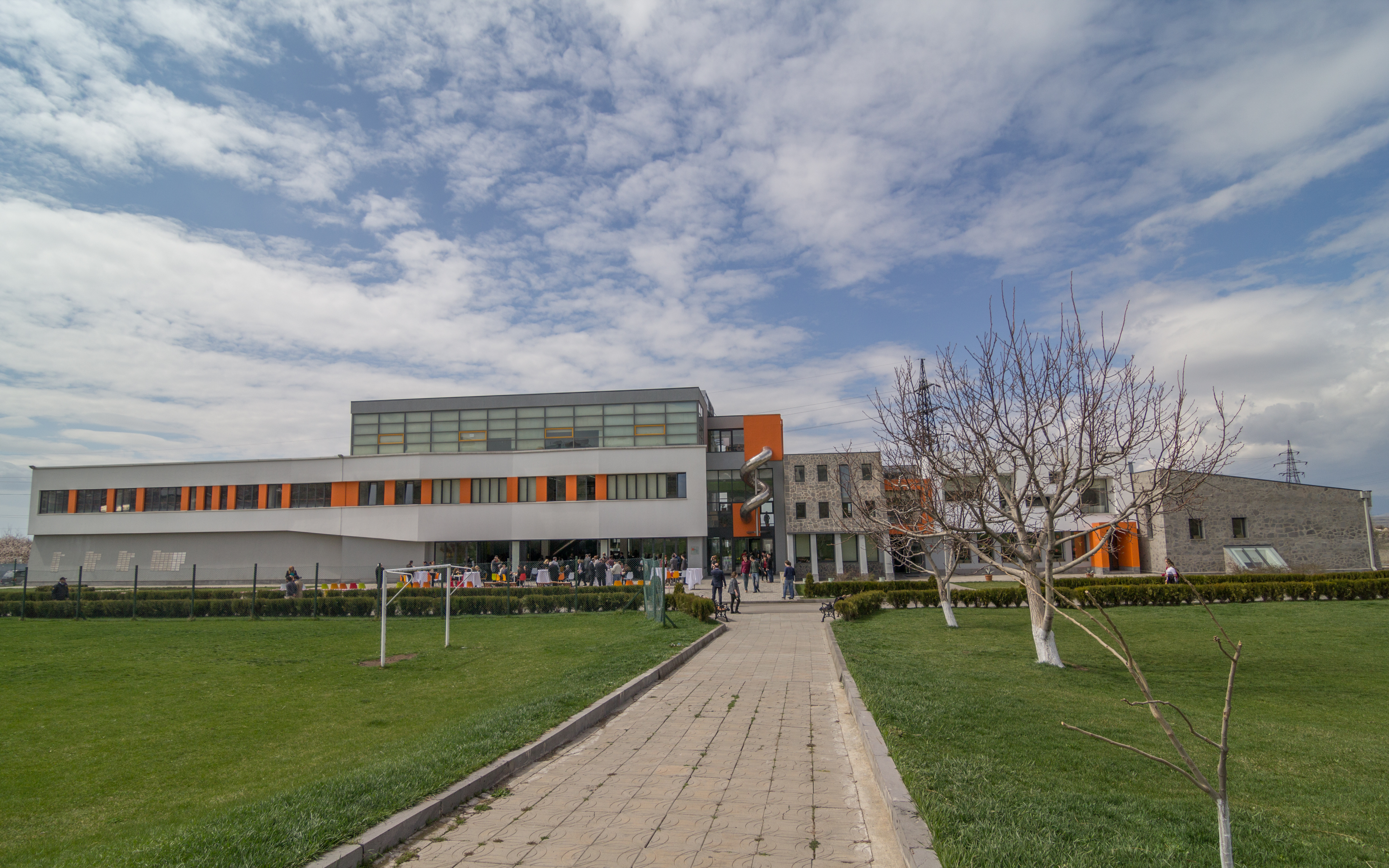

Location
- Tbilisi Highway 11/11, Arabkir District; Yerevan; Armenia

Information
- School type: Private, non-profit organization
- Motto: "Comprehend and Create"
- Established: 2011
- Head of school: Davit Sahakyan (Executive Director)
- Grades: 1-12
- Enrollment: 503 (2022–23)
- Language: Armenian, English, Russian
- Colors: White, Orange
- Affiliation: Ayb Educational Foundation
- Website: Official website

Ayb School (Armenian: Այբ դպրոց) is a private educational complex in Yerevan, Armenia, teaching grades 1 to 12. It was opened in 2011 by the Ayb Educational Foundation. The school is named after the first letter of the Armenian alphabet, Ayb (Armenian: Այբ).

The school is a non-profit organization and functions as a foundation, legally registered as the Ayb Learning Hub Foundation. The motto of the school is "Comprehend and Create" (Armenian: Իմա եւ արա).

The school is governed by a board of trustees. As of 2025, its executive director is Davit Sahakyan.

== History ==
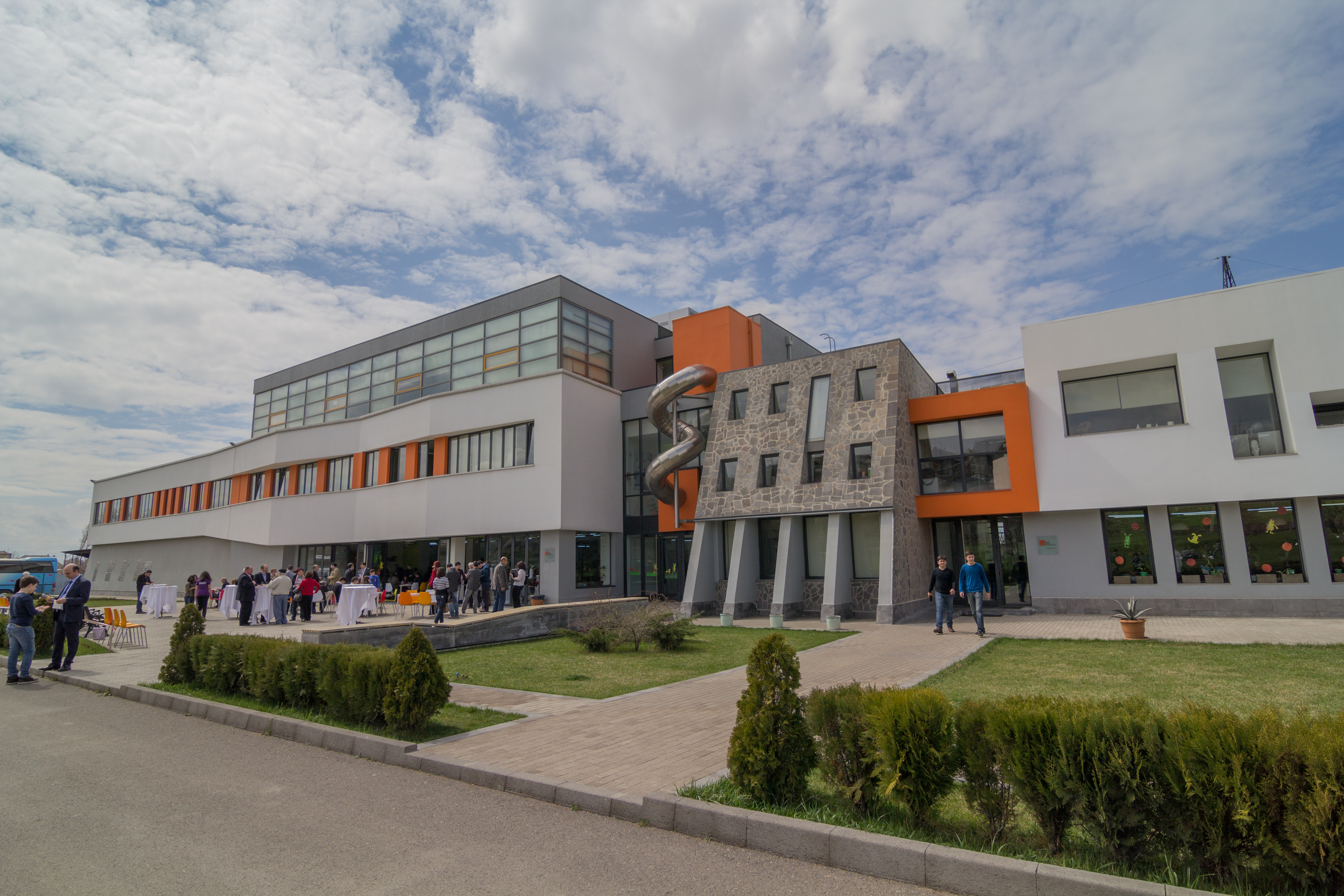
General view

Ayb Educational Foundation was established in 2006 to contribute to the development of education in Armenia. In 2010, the Government of Armenia allocated 6.5 hectares for the Ayb School project. The high school, the first part of the complex, opened on 8 October 2011. The elementary school opened in 2013 and the middle school in 2014. A third building, with four storeys and space for 180 students, opened in October 2017. The campus includes a Fab Lab, and the Church of the Holy Translators is under construction. In September 2025 the school announced that Bjarke Ingels Group would design a new high school building.

== Mission ==
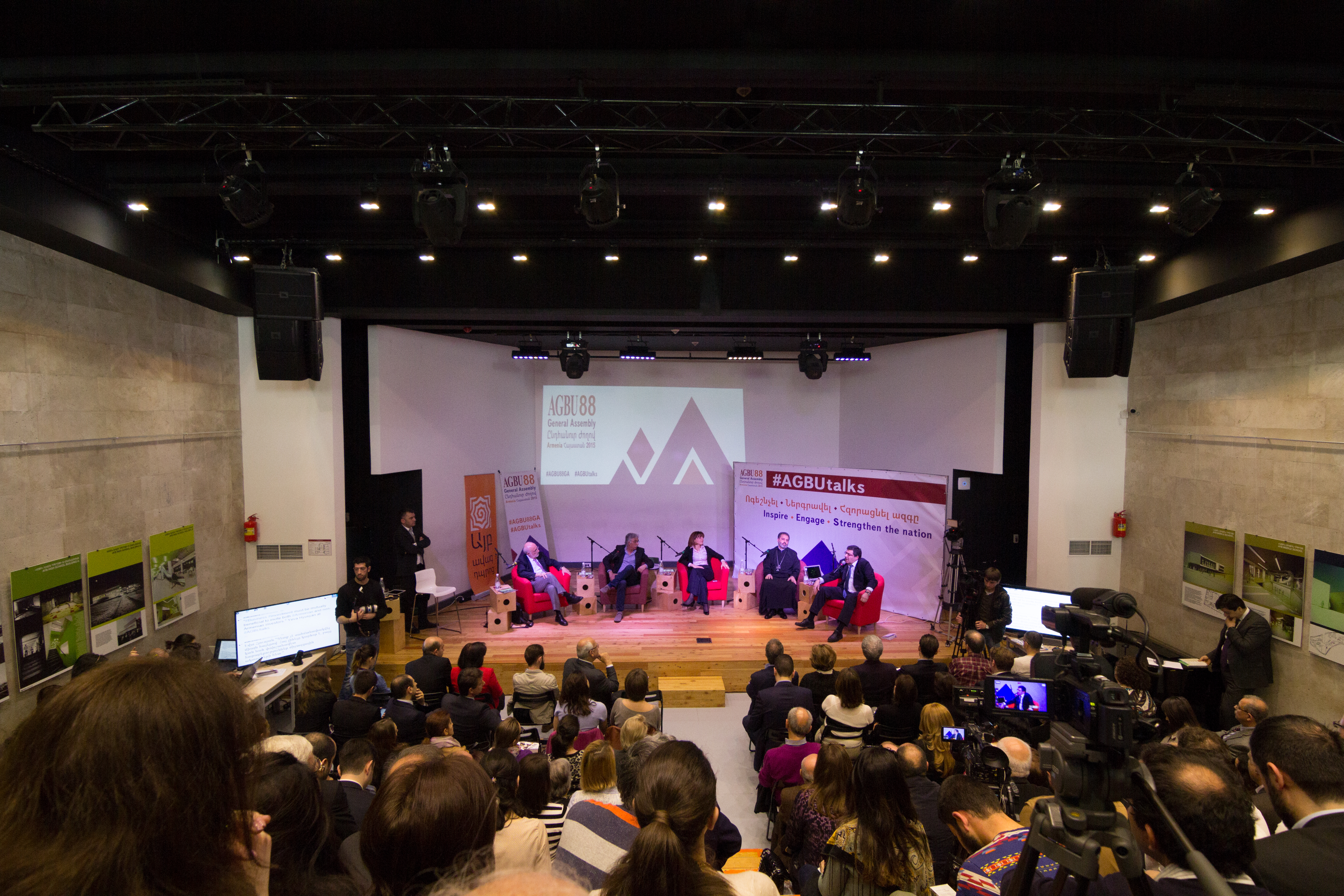
2015 AGBUtalks panel hosted in the auditorium

Dilijan Central School, a second school founded by the Ayb Educational Foundation with the Central Bank of Armenia in 2013, was officially opened in Dilijan, Tavush Province, in September 2015.

== Cooperation ==
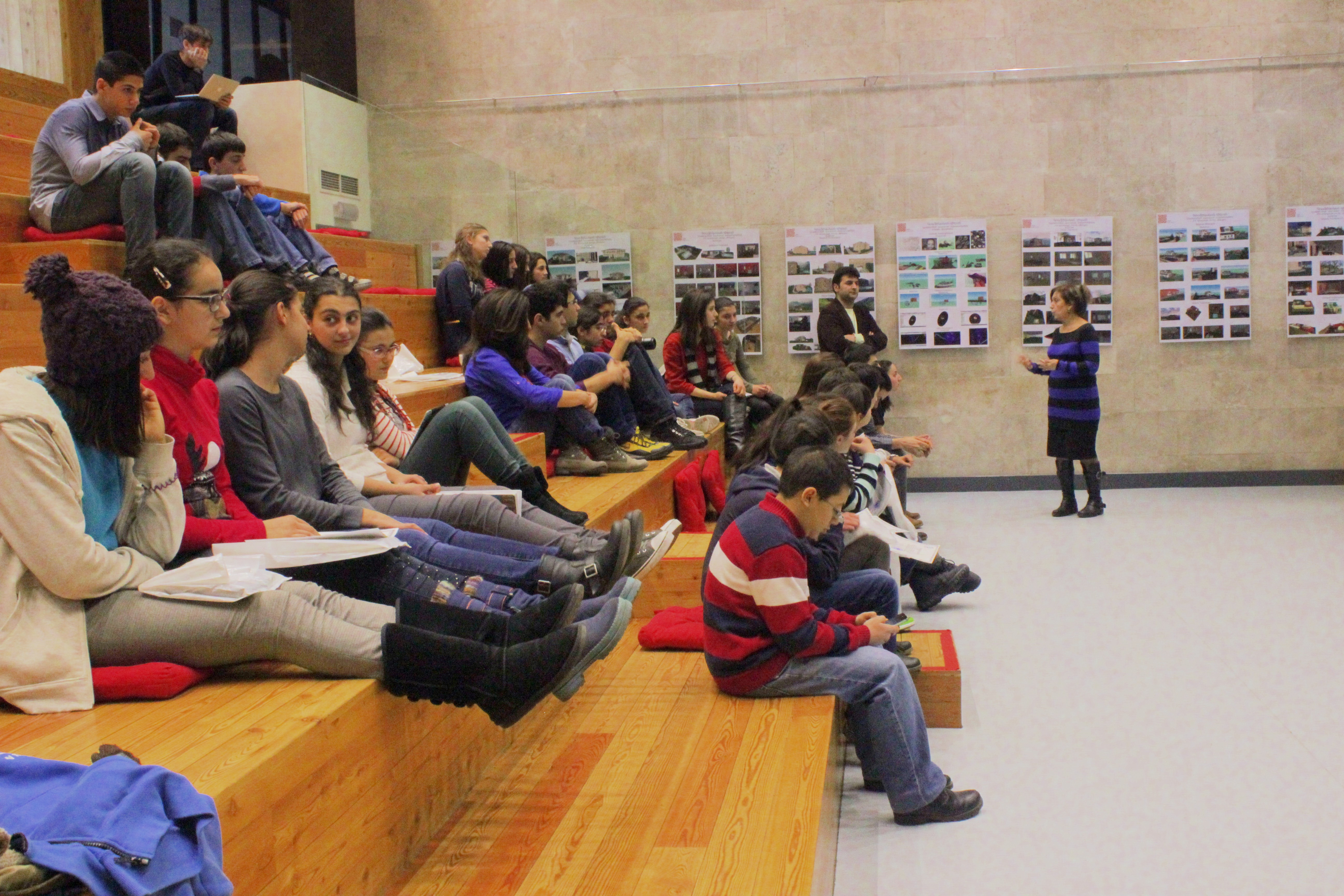
Wikimedia Armenia gathering at the school auditorium

In October 2016, Ayb School joined the Goethe-Institut's "Schools: Partners for the Future" (PASCH) network, after signing a three-way memorandum with the Goethe-Institut and the German Embassy in Yerevan.

== Education program ==
Ayb School teaches the Araratian Baccalaureate (AB), an Armenian-language program that the Ayb Educational Foundation created together with Cambridge Assessment International Education and the UCL Institute of Education. The AB was approved as a formal curriculum in Armenia in 2016. In high school, students choose between 8 and 16 subjects, each taken at either Standard or Extended level. The UK National Recognition Information Centre (UK NARIC) has benchmarked the AB as comparable to the GCE A Level and to US Advanced Placement qualifications. In June 2024 the foundation reported that 212 universities recognised the AB. From the 2026–27 school year, students may also sit Cambridge International AS and A Level exams in English. Students are graded on a 100-point scale.

== Project-based learning ==
Project-based learning is part of the Araratian Baccalaureate syllabus. High school students complete it alongside required courses in eight subject groups.

== Statistics ==
In the 2022–23 academic year, Ayb School had 503 students. According to the school, more than 70% of students receive scholarships (tuition fee reimbursement) every year.

== Admissions and tuition ==
Students are admitted only through entrance exams and interviews. For 2026–27, tuition for new students is AMD 3,987,000 a year, plus a transport fee. Before the school opened in 2011, the annual fee was set at AMD 2,250,000. Financial assistance is based on a family's financial need, and scholarships are offered only to students in grades 10 to 12. In 2019 Aram Pakhchanyan, then director of the school, said the school was not yet inclusive and could not admit children with special needs.
