= Color Lines =

1992 puzzle video game

- Developer(s): Oleg Demin
- Publisher(s): Gamos
- Designer(s): Oleg Demin
- Artist(s): Gennady Denisov; Igor Ivkin
- Platform(s): MS-DOS, Windows
- Release: 1992
- Genre(s): Puzzle
- Mode(s): Single-player

Color Lines (Russian: Цветные Линии) is a puzzle video game created in 1992 by Oleg Demin, Gennady Denisov and Igor Ivkin and published by Gamos Ltd.

== Gameplay ==
A game in progress

It is a turn-based board game. The playing field is a grid of 9 by 9 cells. The game starts with the 5 balls of random colors on the field. Each turn, a player can move any ball to another free cell in a way that its path should go through the other free cells only. If after the move there is a vertical, horizontal, or diagonal line of 5 or more balls of the same color, all these balls disappear, and the player can make another move. If after the move there is no such line, the turn goes to the computer. Computer places 3 new balls of random colors out of 7 possible in random cells. The game continues until the entire field is filled with balls.

The goal of the game is to score the maximum number of points. If a player can place in line more than 5 balls of the same color, he receives significantly more points. During his turn, the player can see 3 balls that will be placed on the next turn by computer.

== Development ==
The first version of the game was released for MS-DOS in 1992.

According to the director of Gamos, Evgeniy Sotnikov, the author and developer of the game was Oleg Demin. But because he was working at Moscow City Hall, his management wouldn't approve his association with Gamos. For that reason, the very first version of the game listed Olga Demina, the wife of Oleg, as the author.

In 1995 the game was ported to Windows 3.1 and Windows 95.

Due to weak copyright laws and widespread pirated software in Russia, by 1996 Color Lines had millions of players and was considered one of the most popular games among office employees, while the publisher sold only 300 legal copies.

== Legacy ==
In 1996 the right for the game was sold to Namco, and based on that the game Golly! Ghosts! Goal! was released, which is part of Golly! Ghost! series of games.

Clones of Color Lines include Five or More, which is part of the GNOME Games, Rainbow Lines, and Park-o-Nora.
