= Mesrop Aramian =

Armenian priest (born 1966)

Mesrop Aramian Մեսրոպ Արամեան
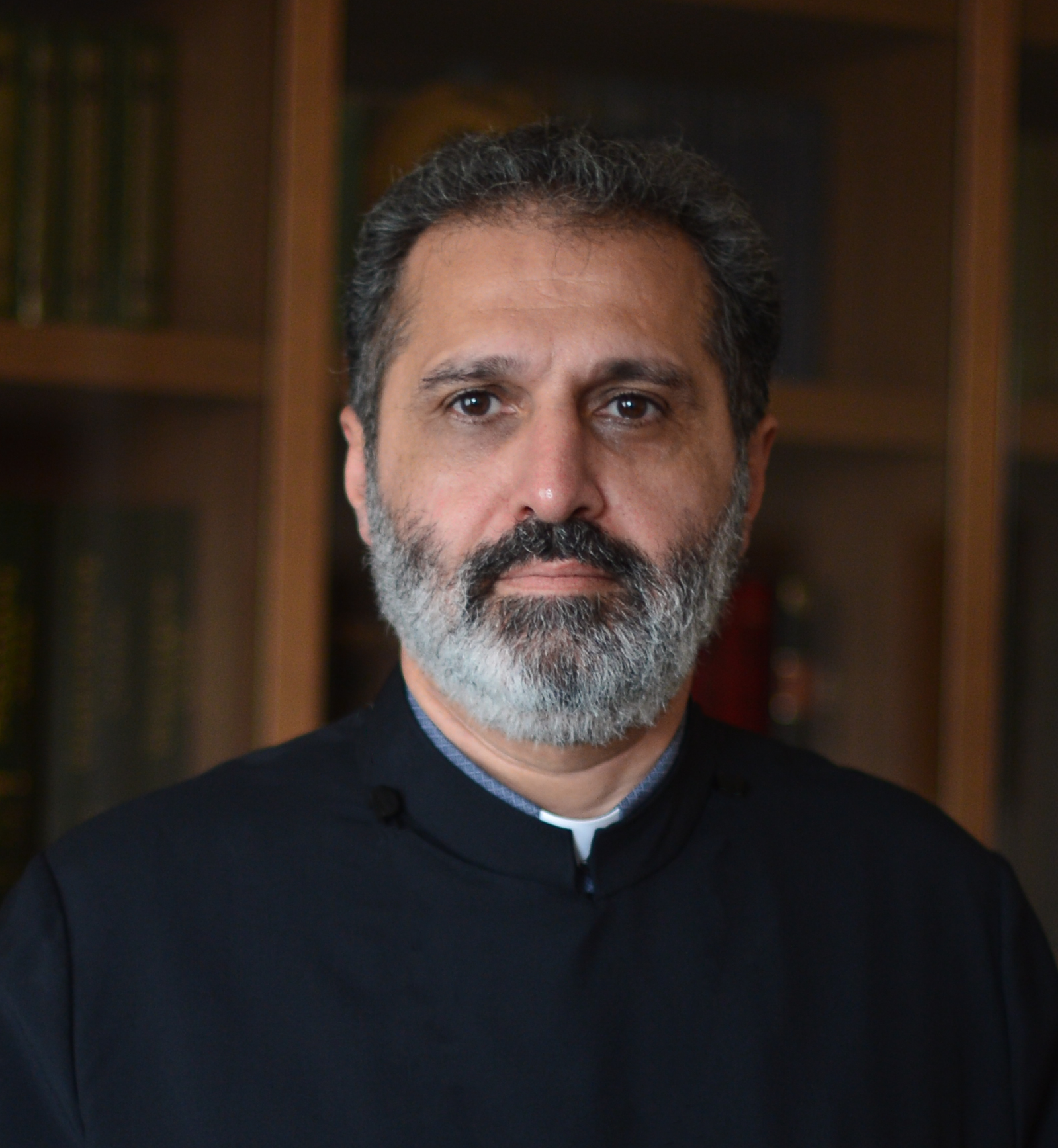
- Born: Matevos Aramian; June 20, 1966 (age 59); Yerevan, Armenian SSR, Soviet Union
- Citizenship: Armenian
- Education: Moscow Institute of Physics and Technology
- Church: Armenian Apostolic Church
- Title: Father

Mesrop Aramian (Armenian: Մեսրոպ Արամեան; born Matevos Aramian, June 20, 1966, in Yerevan, Armenian SSR) is a priest of the Armenian Apostolic Church, theologian, scholar, writer, film producer, social entrepreneur and educator. Author of Ayb School's educational program (Araratian Baccalaureate) and founding chairman of the board of trustees.He is a co-founder of the Ayb Educational Foundation. He is a co-founder and member of the Board of Trustees of the Foundation for Armenian Science and Technology (FAST.) Fr. Mesrop Aramian is a member of the AUAC Board of Trustees. Fr. Mesrop Aramian is the chief editor and founding director of "Gandzasar" Theological Center. He is the founder and director of "Vem Media Arts" and "Vem" Radio Station. He is the scriptwriter and producer of the documentary From Ararat to Zion, creative producer of the film The Book and the author of its idea. Fr. Mesrop has authored an Eastern Armenian translation of The Book of Lamentations by St. Gregory of Narek. He has also authored publications, articles, research studies, radio and TV shows, as well as educational projects and programs.

== Early life and education ==
Fr. Mesrop (baptismal name Matevos) Aramian was born on June 20, 1966, in Yerevan.

Fr. Mesrop is a graduate of Physics-Mathematics Special School in Yerevan. He graduated from the Moscow Institute of Physics and Technology (MIPT) with a Master of Science degree in Engineering and Theoretical Physics in 1990. He successfully passed Lev Landau's "Theoretical Minimums" in 1995-1996 and joined Vitaly Ginzburg's theoretical physics group in 1998. He was ordained a priest of the Armenian Apostolic Church on May 28, 1991.

== Professional life ==
In 1991, Fr. Mesrop Aramian founded Gandzasar Theological Center and heads it as Director and Editor-in-Chief. To date, the center has published over 80 publications.

In 2002, he founded Vem spiritual-cultural radio station and has since been its Editor-in-Chief.

In 2004, he created and still heads Vem Media Arts film production studio, which has released 12 environmental documentaries. Vem Media Arts has also produced two television shows: Catechism and Spiritual Discussions.

In 2006, in association with a group of friends, he established the Ayb Educational Foundation.

In 2010, Vem Media Arts released the internationally acclaimed documentary feature film, From Ararat to Zion, depicting the centuries-old Armenian presence in the Holy Land. Fr. Mesrop Aramian is the writer and producer of the film.

In 2011, the Ayb Educational Foundation established Ayb School. Fr. Mesrop Aramian is the author of the educational curriculum of Ayb School (Araratian Baccalaureate), as well as founding chairman of the school Board of Trustees.

From 2013 to 2018, he was Adviser to the RA President on Education on a voluntary basis.

In 2014, Vem Media Arts studio released the film The Book. Fr. Mesrop Aramian is the creative producer and author of the film idea.

In 2014, the RA Ministry of Education and Science and Ayb Educational Foundation in cooperation with the University of Cambridge and UCL Institute of Education launched a major educational initiative - the National Program for Educational Excellence (NPEE), based on Ayb School's curricula. From 2014 to 2018, Fr. Mesrop Aramian was the Program Director.

In 2016, Fr. Mesrop Aramian was elected to the Board of Trustees of AUAC.

Since 2017, he has been a co-founder and member of the Board of Trustees of the Foundation for Armenian Science and Technology (FAST.)

In 2019, Vem Educational and Cultural Foundation published The Book of Lamentations by St. Gregory of Narek (translation by Fr. Mesrop Aramian).

== Affiliations ==
He is a member of the Artsakh Diocesan Council and was twice elected a delegate for the National Ecclesiastic Assembly from the Artsakh Diocese.

He is a member of the International Association of Patristic Studies.

== Awards and honors ==
On June 5, 2010, Artsakh President Bako Sahakyan awarded Fr. Mesrop Aramian with Mesrop Mashtots order.

On June 2, 2017, Fr. Mesrop Aramian received a 2nd Class Medal for Services to the Motherland․

== Personal life ==
Fr. Mesrop Aramian is married. Together with his spouse Irina, they raise seven children: Nerses, Mariam, Marta, Gayane, Mikayel, Sofia, and Hovhannes.

== Articles ==
- “St Gregory of Narek: Genius of Prayer,” April 18, 2015.
- “Jumping over the Abyss,” April 3, 2015
- “Values,” March 16, 2015.
- “A Mission that Unites Us All,” April 7, 2015.
- “Competitive Education and Armenian Realities,” April 10, 2011.
- “Restoring the Orthography of the Armenian Nation: A Task for Our Generation,” January 18, 2009.

== Interviews ==
- Interview to "Yerkir Media", December 15, 2021 (in Armenian)
- Interview to "Наша Среда online" April 27, 2021 (in Russian)
- "Systemic christianity" article series, January 25, 2021 (in Armenian)
- Interview to Tert.am on an Eastern Armenian translation of the Book of Lamentations by St. Gregory of Narek, June 19, 2019. (in Armenian)
- Yerkir Media TV hosted Fr. Mesrop Aramian, September 20, 2018. (in Armenian)
- Interview to Aravot, October 14, 2016. (in Armenian)
- Interview to Mediamax: “Fr. Mesrop Aramyan: FAST is a Strategic Project,” August 30, 2016.
- Interview to Mediamax, April 22, 2015.
- Armenia TV’s R-Evolution show hosted Fr. Mesrop Aramian, September 1, 2013. (in Armenian)
- Interview to Aniv (The Wheel) Russian-language magazine: “Discussions with Fr. Mesrop Aramian: We Haven’t Agreed around Anything,” January 15, 2013. (in Russian)
  - Continuation--(N4, (43), January 28, 2013. (in Russian)
- Interview to Shant TV, March 7, 2011. (in Armenian)
- Interview to Yerevan Russian-language magazine: "Following the Guiding Star" (“Za putevodnoy zvezdoy”), January-February 2010 issue. (in Russian)
- Interview to Aniv (The Wheel) magazine: “Spiritual Labor,” July 25, 2009. (in Russian)

== Published works ==
=== Collection of works ===
- Fr. Mesrop Aramian. Works, Volume I, Yerevan, 2016.
- Fr. Mesrop Aramian. Works, Volume II, Yerevan, 2016.

=== Theological studies ===
- "The Confession of Faith of the Three Ecumenical Councils: A Theological Sketch". Yerevan. Gandzasar Theological Review 1 (1992): 110–140.
- "An Outline of the Christological Thought of the Armenian Church (IV–VIII Centuries): Dogmatic Study". Yerevan. Gandzasar Theological Review 2 (1992): 86–122.
- "The Theology of the Rite of Baptism". Yerevan. Gandzasar Theological Review 3 (1993): 57–88, 4 (1993): 72–94.
- "The Principle of Oneness in Theology". Yerevan. Gandzasar Theological Review 5 (1994): 81–96.
- "Hovhannes Sarkavag's Collection 'On the Confession of Faith of the 318 [Fathers] of Nicea'". Yerevan. Gandzasar Theological Review 6 (1996): 44–78.
- "The Confession of Orthodox Faith as the Basis for Spiritual Life". Yerevan: Vem. Gandzasar Theological Review 7 (2002): 27–49.
- "The Transfiguration of Christ". Yerevan. Gandzasar Theological Review 8 (2010): 11–20.

=== Translations and other studies ===
- S. Nerses Shnorhali. Encyclical. Translated into Eastern Armenian by Fr. Mesrop Aramian, Tigran Khachatryan, and Seda Stamboltsyan. Yerevan, 1991. Gandzasar series.
- St. Nilus of Sinai. On Prayer. Yerevan. Gandzasar Theological Review 1 (1992): 177–196. Translated into Eastern Armenian.
- Song of Songs, With Commentary of the Ancient Fathers. Yerevan, 1993. Gandzasar series. Study.
- St. John Mandakuni. Epistles, 1–4. Yerevan. Gandzasar Theological Review 3 (1993): 122–146. Translated into Eastern Armenian.
- St. Gregory the Illuminator. Stromata, 1, 2, 16. Yerevan. Gandzasar Theological Review 4 (1993): 134–164. Translated into Eastern Armenian.
- On Spiritual Life. Yerevan, 1997. Gandzasar series. Collection of discourses by medieval Armenian Fathers. Five of the discourses were translated by Fr. Mesrop Aramian.
- Prayer Book. Yerevan: Vem, 2000. [Compiler, co-translator, and author of additional materials]. Classical Armenian texts with parallel Eastern Armenian translations.
- St. Athanasius of Alexandria. On the Incarnation of the Son and on the Holy Trinity. Translated from Classical Armenian by Fr. Mesrop Aramian and Deacon Sahak Ghazaryan. Yerevan: Vem. Gandzasar Theological Review 7 (2002): 188–212.
- St. John of Odzun. Against Docetists. Translated from Classical Armenian by Fr. Mesrop Aramian and Deacon Ara Nalchajyan. Yerevan: Vem. Gandzasar Theological Review 7 (2002): 237–273.
- The Divine Liturgy of the Holy Armenian Apostolic Orthodox Church. Yerevan: Gandzasar Theological Center, 2010. Study and Eastern Armenian translation with parallel Classical Armenian text.
- St. Gregory of Narek. The Book of Lamentations. Translated into Eastern Armenian by Fr. Mesrop Aramian. Yerevan, 2019.

=== Critical Editions of Classical Armenian Texts ===
- On the Confession of Faith of the 318 [Fathers] of Nicea. Discourse 1. Yerevan. Gandzasar Theological Review 6(1996): 278–297.
- Word of Faith Against Heretics. Yerevan: Vem. Gandzasar Theological Review 7 (2002): 298–331.
- On the Confession of Faith of the 318 [Fathers] of Nicea. Discourses 5–7, 10–11. Yerevan: Vem. Gandzasar Theological Review 7 (2002): 332–370.
- John of Erznka's Discourse on the 140th Psalm, Yerevan: Vem. Gandzasar Theological Review 7 (2002): 384–386.
- On the Confession of Faith of the 318 [Fathers] of Nicea. Discourses 2–4, 8–9, 12–14. Yerevan. Gandzasar Theological Review 8 (2010): 351–455.

=== Other ===
- The Holy Week (coloring book)]. Yerevan: Gandzasar Theological Review, 1992. (Author of the texts).
