= ABBYY =

American digital intelligence company

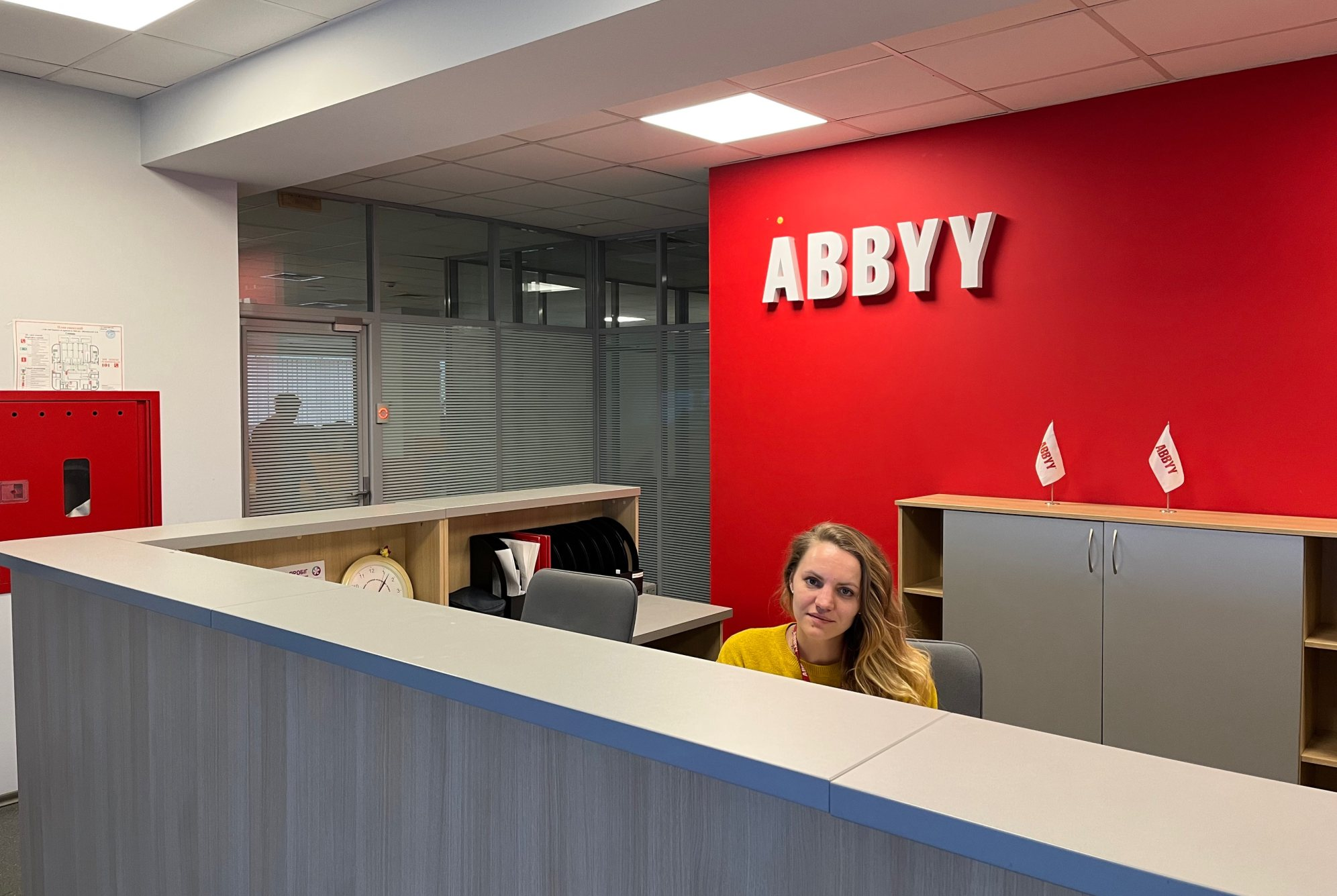
- Office of ABBYY in Kyiv, Ukraine
- Type: Private
- Founded: 1989
- Founder: David Yang
- Headquarters: Austin, Texas, United States
- Area served: Worldwide
- Number of employees: 500 (2023)
- Website: abbyy.com

ABBYY is an American technology company specializing in Optical character recognition (OCR), AI document processing, and automation, data capture, process mining and optical character recognition (OCR). It was founded in the USSR and operated in Russia for nine years before moving to the United States. Primarily focused on software as a service model, the company serves clients worldwide. ABBYY offers ABBYY FineReader, an OCR computer program.

== History ==
ABBYY began in 1989, when David Yang founded BIT Software company in Moscow. In the early 1990s, the company introduced optical character recognition (OCR) and since then kept investing in artificial intelligence (AI), natural language processing (NLP) and machine learning (ML). In July 1993, the company released the first version of its ABBYY FineReader text-recognition software.

In 2019, ABBYY acquired TimelinePI, a process mining company, and Marlin Equity Partners became its biggest shareholder in 2021.

After the full-scale invasion of Ukraine by Russia began in 2022, ABBYY began closing its sales, development, and service provision in Russia and Belarus. As of October 2024, ABBYY’s former Russian legal entities are liquidated. On 1 October 2024, Radio Liberty reported that, according to accounts from employees, ABBYY employees with Russian citizenship had been dismissed from branches in Serbia, Hungary and Cyprus.

== Offices & management ==
The company was headquartered in Milpitas, California, with regional offices in 15 countries. As of May 2023, ABBYY Group had about 500 employees across 13 countries.

In September 2024 ABBYY dismissed part of its personnel, including some software developers. In October 2024, the company announced that it would move its headquarters to Austin, Texas, but keep the Milpitas office for sales, marketing and operations.

ABBYY's CEO is Ulf Persson.

== Company products ==
- ABBYY FineReader, an application for documents and PDF files, based on ABBYY OCR technology.
- ABBYY Vantage, a platform for AI document processing (recognition, classification, and data retrieval).
- ABBYY FlexiCapture, another AI document processing platform. In 2019, natural language processing technologies were added.
- ABBYY Timeline, a platform for business process analysis and task mining.

Additional products include NeoML, a cross-platform open-source machine learning library.
