= Urdaneta-Armsat =

Series of Spanish-Armenian nanosatellites

- COSPAR ID: 2022-057AK
- SATCAT no.: 52765

Spacecraft properties
- Spacecraft type: 16U CubeSat
- Launch mass: 16.4 kilograms (36 lb)

Start of mission
- Launch date: 25 May 2022
- Rocket: Falcon-9

Urdaneta-Armsat is a series of Spanish-Armenian nanosatellites developed by the Basque company Satlantis Microsats in collaboration with the Armenian national company Geocosmos, in the CubeSat (16U) format.

The first satellite in this series, Armsat-1, was launched into orbit by Armenia in May 2022, thus becoming the first Armenian satellite.

== History ==
=== Background and Design ===
Armenia has been seeking to develop a space program since the 2020s, particularly aiming to achieve strategic autonomy in the satellite field. The country embarked on a dual program, enlisting the services of the Spanish company Satlantis Microsats in collaboration with its national company Geocosmos to develop a series of research satellites called Urdaneta-Armsat. Additionally, Armenia began developing a fully Armenian program to achieve strategic autonomy, including the launch of the Hayasat-1 satellite towards the end of 2023.

The Urdaneta-Armsat series consists of satellites commissioned by Armenia, equipped with the Satlantis iSIM-907 optical device. These satellites are intended for non-military observation purposes, such as agricultural organization and security. They weigh 16.4kg and are designed to operate in a sun-synchronous orbit at an altitude of approximately 530km. The expected lifespan of these satellites is around 4 years.

=== Urdaneta-Armsat-1 ===
The first satellite of the series, named Urdaneta-Armsat-1, was launched into orbit on 25 May 2022, from Cape Canaveral using a SpaceX Falcon 9 rocket. It was the first Armenian satellite in orbit and was also described as the first Basque satellite, as Satlantis is a Basque company.

The Armenian side expressed satisfaction with the launch and operation of Armsat-1, leading them to sign a longer contract with Satlantis.

=== Future Developments ===
At least a second satellite is planned. During the 2023 Azerbaijani offensive in Nagorno-Karabakh, the satellite captured images of areas affected by conflict, although Armenian authorities stated that it was not used for military purposes. As a development, Armenia is constructing a control center within its borders to enhance its monitoring and development capabilities in relation to this satellite and future ones.
