= Garov =

Garov may refer to

- Harov, a village in Azerbaijan
- Iliyan Garov (born 1984), Bulgarian football defender
