= Chapar, Nagorno-Karabakh =

Village in Aghdara District, Azerbaijan

Chapar Չափար
- Village
- Çapar
- Location within Azerbaijan Location within East Zangezur Economic Region
- Coordinates: 40°09′13″N 46°25′26″E
- Country: Azerbaijan
  - District: Aghdara

Population (2015)
  - Total: 355
- Time zone: UTC+4 (AZT)

Chapar (Armenian: Չափար; Azerbaijani: Çapar) is a village located in the Aghdara District of Azerbaijan, in the disputed region of Nagorno-Karabakh. Until 2023 it was controlled by the breakaway Republic of Artsakh. The village had an ethnic Armenian-majority population until the expulsion of the Armenian population of Nagorno-Karabakh by Azerbaijan following the 2023 Azerbaijani offensive in Nagorno-Karabakh.

== History ==
During the Soviet period, the village was a part of the Mardakert District of the Nagorno-Karabakh Autonomous Oblast.

== Historical heritage sites ==
Historical heritage sites in and around the village include the fortress of Hakarakaberd (Armenian: Հակառակաբերդ) from between the 9th and 13th centuries, the 12th/13th-century monastery of Karmir Kar (Armenian: Կարմիր քար), a 12th/13th-century cemetery and khachkar, the chapel of Sorpen Duz (Armenian: Սորփեն Դուզ) built in 1273, the medieval shrine of Ojakh (Armenian: Օջախ), and the village of Hin Chapar (Armenian: Հին Չափար, lit. 'Old Chapar') dating from between the 17th and 19th centuries.

== Economy and culture ==
The population is mainly engaged in agriculture and animal husbandry. As of 2015, the village has a municipal building, a secondary school, a kindergarten, two shops, and a medical centre.

== Demographics ==
The village had 252 inhabitants in 2005, and 355 inhabitants in 2015.
