= Machkalashen =

Village in Khojavend District, Azerbaijan

Machkalashen Մաճկալաշեն
- Cütcü
- Location within Azerbaijan
- Coordinates: 39°41′38″N 47°01′44″E
- Country: Azerbaijan
  - District: Khojavend

Population (2015)
  - Total: 546
- Time zone: UTC+4 (AZT)

Machkalashen (Armenian: Մաճկալաշեն; Azerbaijani: Cütcü) is a village located in the Khojavend District of Azerbaijan, in the region of Nagorno-Karabakh. Until 2023 it was controlled by the breakaway Republic of Artsakh. The village had an ethnic Armenian-majority population until the expulsion of the Armenian population of Nagorno-Karabakh by Azerbaijan following the 2023 Azerbaijani offensive in Nagorno-Karabakh. The Amaras Monastery is located close to the village.

== History ==
During the Soviet period, the village was a part of the Martuni District of the Nagorno-Karabakh Autonomous Oblast.

== Economy and culture ==
The population is mainly engaged in agriculture and animal husbandry. As of 2015, the village has a municipal building, a house of culture, a secondary school, a kindergarten, and a medical centre.

== Demographics ==
The village had 593 inhabitants in 2005, and 546 inhabitants in 2015.
