= Hayasat-1 =

Miniaturized satellite

- Mission type: Technology
- Operator: Bazoomq
- SATCAT no.: 58471

Spacecraft properties
- Spacecraft type: 1U CubeSat
- Launch mass: 1 kilogram (2.2 lb)

Start of mission
- Launch date: 1 December 2023
- Rocket: Falcon-9

End of mission
- Decay date: 28 April 2025

Hayasat-1 (in Armenian: Հայասաթ-1) is an Armenian nano-satellite developed by Bazoomq Space Research Laboratory and CSIE (Center for Scientific Innovation and Education) in the CubeSat format. It is the second Armenian satellite to be launched into orbit, but the first one designed and created entirely by Armenians.

It is intended to serve for purposes of natural disaster management, border control, and satellite science research. Hayasat-1 was launched into orbit on December 1, 2023. It reentered the atmosphere on 28 April 2025.

== History ==
=== Conception ===
Although Armenia had already launched its first satellite, named ArmSat-1, in May 2022, Hayasat-1 is the first satellite entirely created in Armenia by Armenian entities. It is a significant achievement for the country, which aims to achieve strategic autonomy in the satellite domain. The project to create Hayasat-1 was initiated in January 2022.

The satellite was developed by a laboratory at the CSIE of Armenia in collaboration with the Armenian company Bazoomq. It weighs approximately 1 kg and is built in the CubeSat (1U) format. It consists of sensors designed to understand the specific conditions in space and is powered by a combination of batteries and solar panels. Hayasat-1 has a cube-shaped form, measuring 10 centimeters by 10 centimeters. On one of its sides, it bears the inscription in capital letters and in English: "Armenia in space for science." It is expected to orbit at an altitude of 550 km, with an estimated lifespan of about 5 years according to Bazoomq. Its orbit is sun-synchronous, completing a full revolution around the Earth every 90 minutes. The satellite successfully met the required conditions after a series of tests.

Its objectives include monitoring natural disasters, conducting satellite science research, and enhancing border control capabilities for Armenia.

=== Launch ===
After being delayed for two days, the satellite was launched on December 1, 2023, from the Vandenberg Space Force Base, using a Falcon-9 rocket. It was part of a mission that included 25 satellites, including the first South Korean reconnaissance satellite.

The launch was live-streamed on YouTube by Bazoomq.

=== Post-launch ===
A few days after the launch, successful communications were established with the satellite.
