= Khachmach =

Khachmach Խաչմաչ
- Xaçmaç
- Location within Azerbaijan Location within Karabakh Economic Region
- Coordinates: 39°45′09″N 46°52′27″E
- Country: Azerbaijan
  - District: Khojaly

Population (2015)
  - Total: 227
- Time zone: UTC+4 (AZT)

Khachmach (Armenian: Խաչմաչ; Azerbaijani: Xaçmaç) is a village in the Khojaly District of Azerbaijan, in the region of Nagorno-Karabakh. Until 2023 it was controlled by the breakaway Republic of Artsakh. The village had an ethnic Armenian-majority population until the expulsion of the Armenian population of Nagorno-Karabakh by Azerbaijan following the 2023 Azerbaijani offensive in Nagorno-Karabakh.

== History ==
During the Soviet period, the village was a part of the Askeran District of the Nagorno-Karabakh Autonomous Oblast.

Khachmach was controlled by the breakaway state Artsakh until its dissolution in 2024.

== Historical heritage sites ==
Historical heritage sites in and around the village include a 13th-century khachkar, St. Stephen's Church (Armenian: Սուրբ Ստեփանոս եկեղեցի, romanized: Surb Stepanos Yekeghetsi) built in 1651, a 17th-century cemetery, and the 18th-century church of Shoshkavank (Armenian: Շոշկավանք), restored in the 20th century.

== Economy and culture ==
The population is mainly engaged in agriculture and animal husbandry. As of 2015, the village has a municipal building, a house of culture, a secondary school, and a medical centre.

== Demographics ==
The village had 202 inhabitants in 2005, and 227 inhabitants in 2015.
