= Mayrakahag =

Fortified colony in Nagorno-Karabakh

Mayrakahag (Armenian: Մայրաքաղաք, romanized: Mayrakaghak, also called Kahakatekh) — is a fortified colony in Nagorno-Karabakh. It was the residence of the Israelyan family, one of the families of the Armenian lords (meliks) in Karabakh. Mayrakahag is located on the east bank of the Tartar river in the Vaghuhas village, today located in the de facto independent Republic of Artsakh.

It represents a complex of several ruined buildings, an old cemetery and the Tiramayr Monastery. The monastery and the cemetery was badly destroyed in the period from 1920 to the 1930s. The Armenians called the surviving fortress towers "Sergevlaser" (meaning "quince pass" in Armenian).
