= Vaghuhas =

Vaghuhas Վաղուհաս
- Qozlu
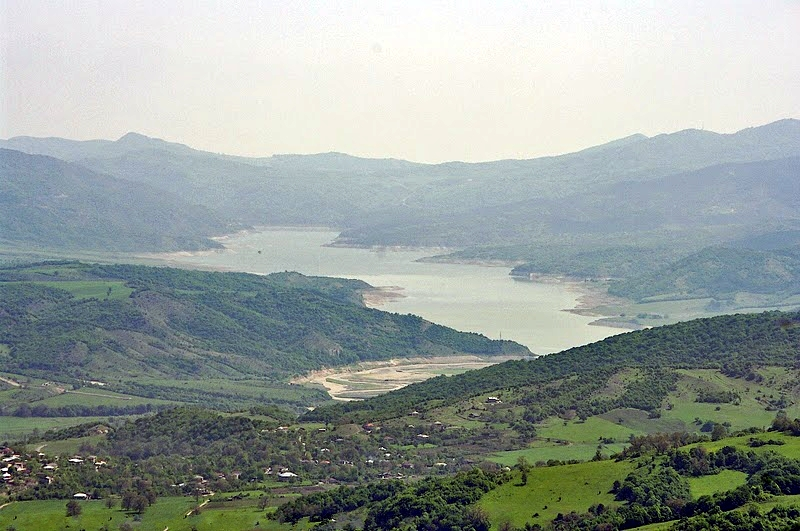

- Location within Azerbaijan Location within East Zangezur Economic Region
- Coordinates: 40°06′52″N 46°28′47″E
- Country: Azerbaijan
  - District: Aghdara
- Elevation: 988 m (3,241 ft)

Population (2015)
  - Total: 678
- Time zone: UTC+4 (AZT)

Vaghuhas (Armenian: Վաղուհաս) or Gozlu (Azerbaijani: Qozlu) is a village located in the Aghdara District of Azerbaijan, in the region of Nagorno-Karabakh. Until 2023 it was controlled by the breakaway Republic of Artsakh. The village had an ethnic Armenian-majority population until the expulsion of the Armenian population of Nagorno-Karabakh by Azerbaijan following the 2023 Azerbaijani offensive in Nagorno-Karabakh.

== History ==
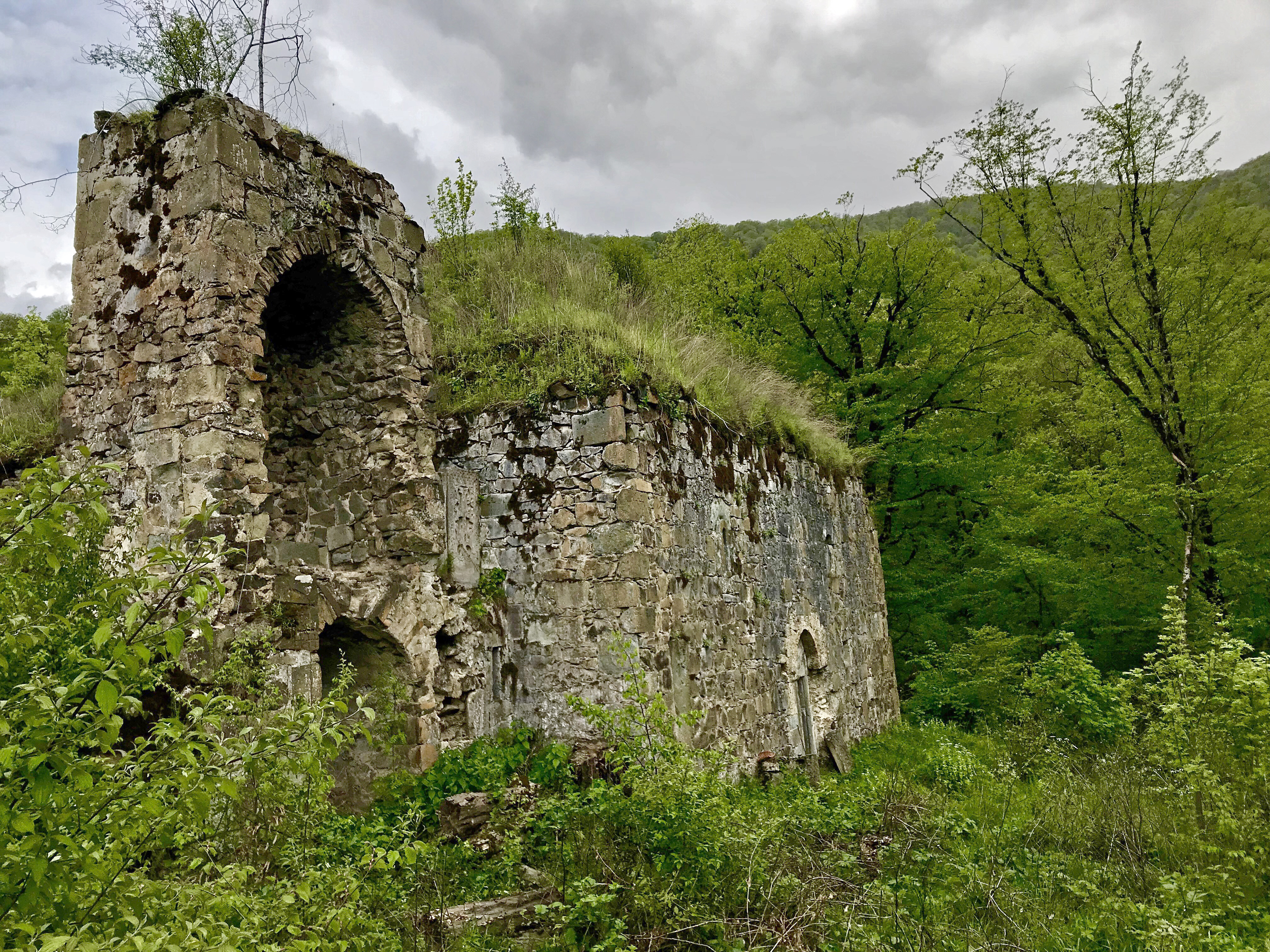
The monastery of Khatravank (Armenian: Խաթրավանք) built in 1204, near Vaghuhas

During the Soviet period, the village was a part of the Mardakert District of the Nagorno-Karabakh Autonomous Oblast.

According to civilian reports, during the 2023 Azerbaijani offensive in Nagorno-Karabakh, Azerbaijani soldiers entered the village and forcibly demanded that its entire Armenian population leave while firing their weapons in the air.

== Historical heritage sites ==
Historical heritage sites in and around the village include the ruins of the ancient Armenian settlement of Mayrakahag (Armenian: Մայրաքաղաք), including the Tiramayr Monastery (Armenian: Տիրամայր Վանք) built in 1183, an 8th/9th-century chapel, a 12th/13th-century cemetery, the monastery of Khatravank (Armenian: Խաթրավանք) built in 1204, the monastery of Karmiravan (Armenian: Կարմիրավան) built in 1224, also known as the Red Monastery – Karmir Vank, Կարմիր վանք, and the medieval village of Hin Vaghuhas (Armenian: Հին Վաղուհաս, lit. 'Old Vaghuhas').

== Economy and culture ==
The population is mainly engaged in agriculture and animal husbandry. As of 2015, the village has a municipal building, a house of culture, a secondary school, seven shops, and a medical centre.

== Demographics ==
The village had 638 inhabitants in 2005, and 678 inhabitants in 2015.

== Gallery ==
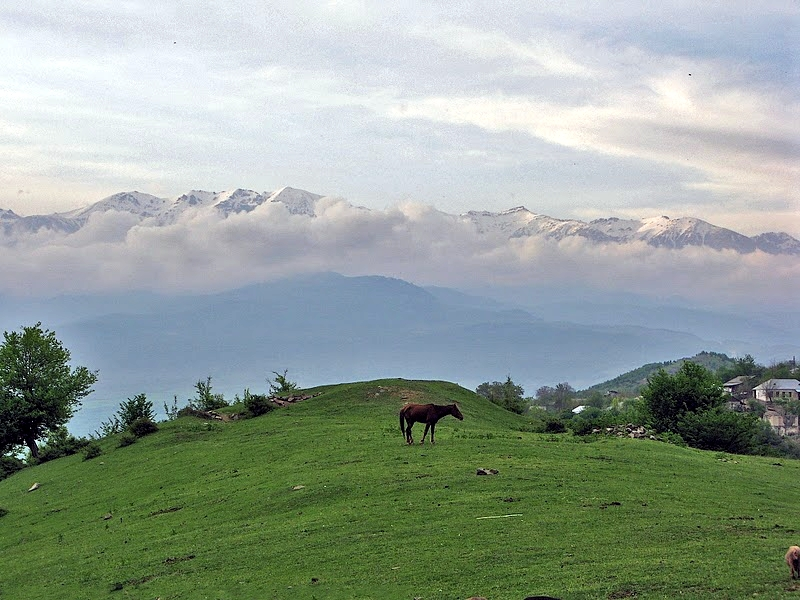
Scenery around Vaghuhas

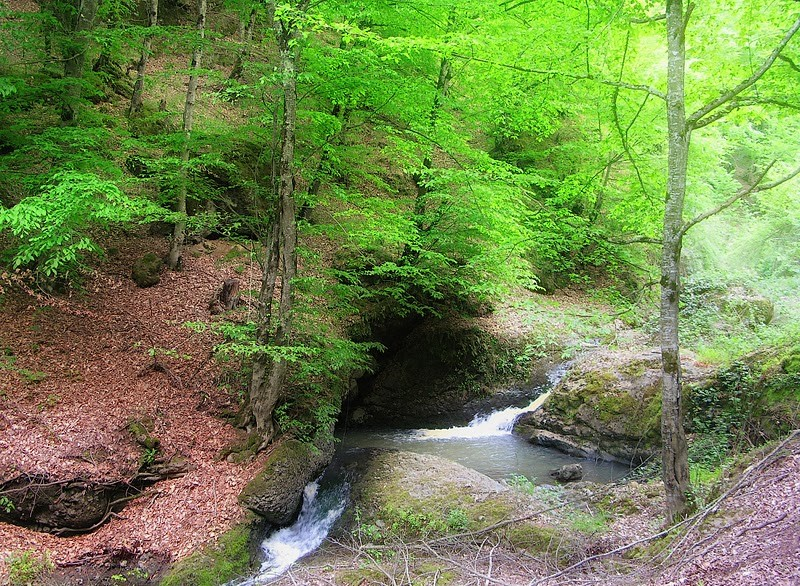
Forest near the village

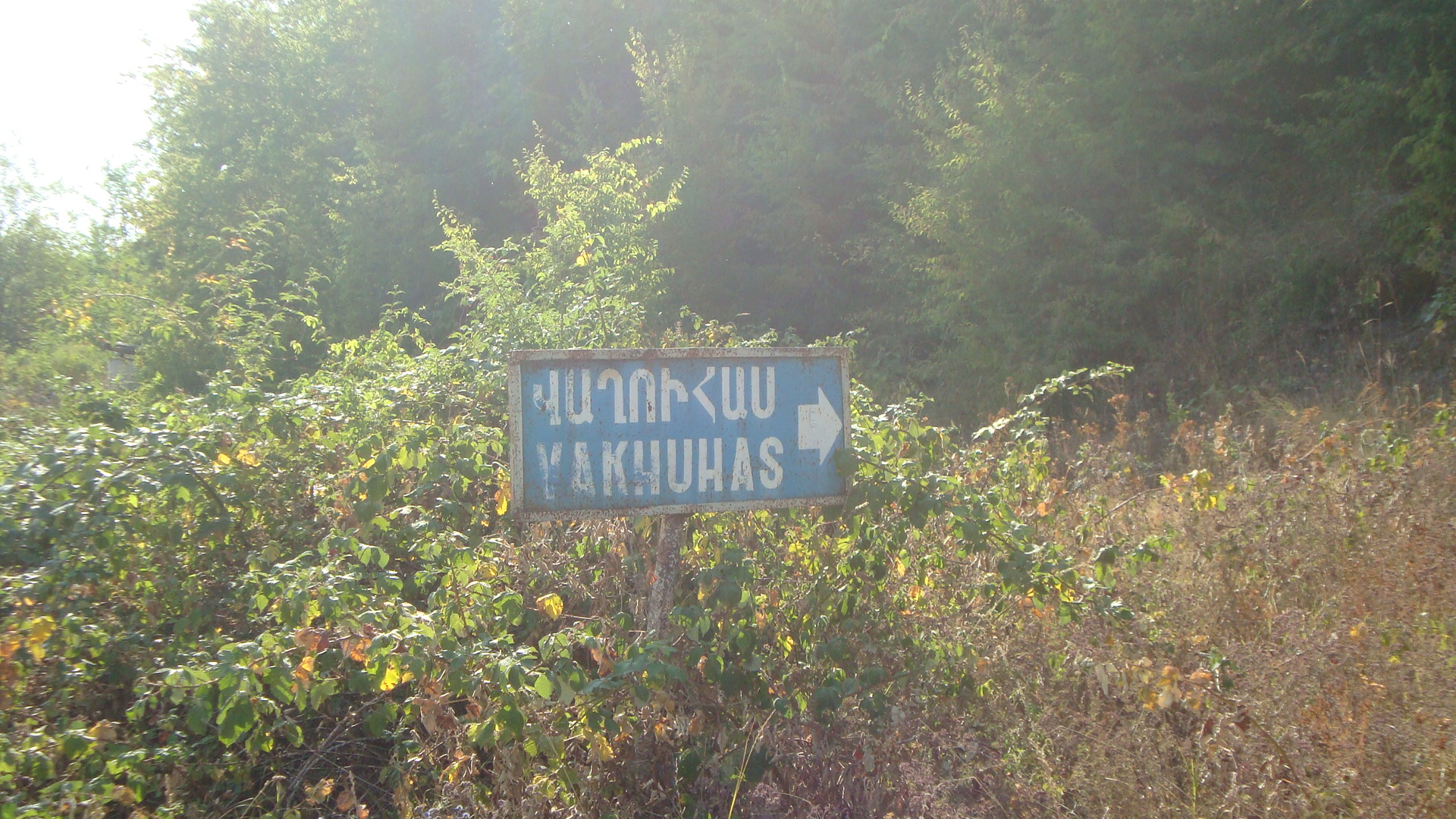
A sign in Armenian reading "Vaghuhas"

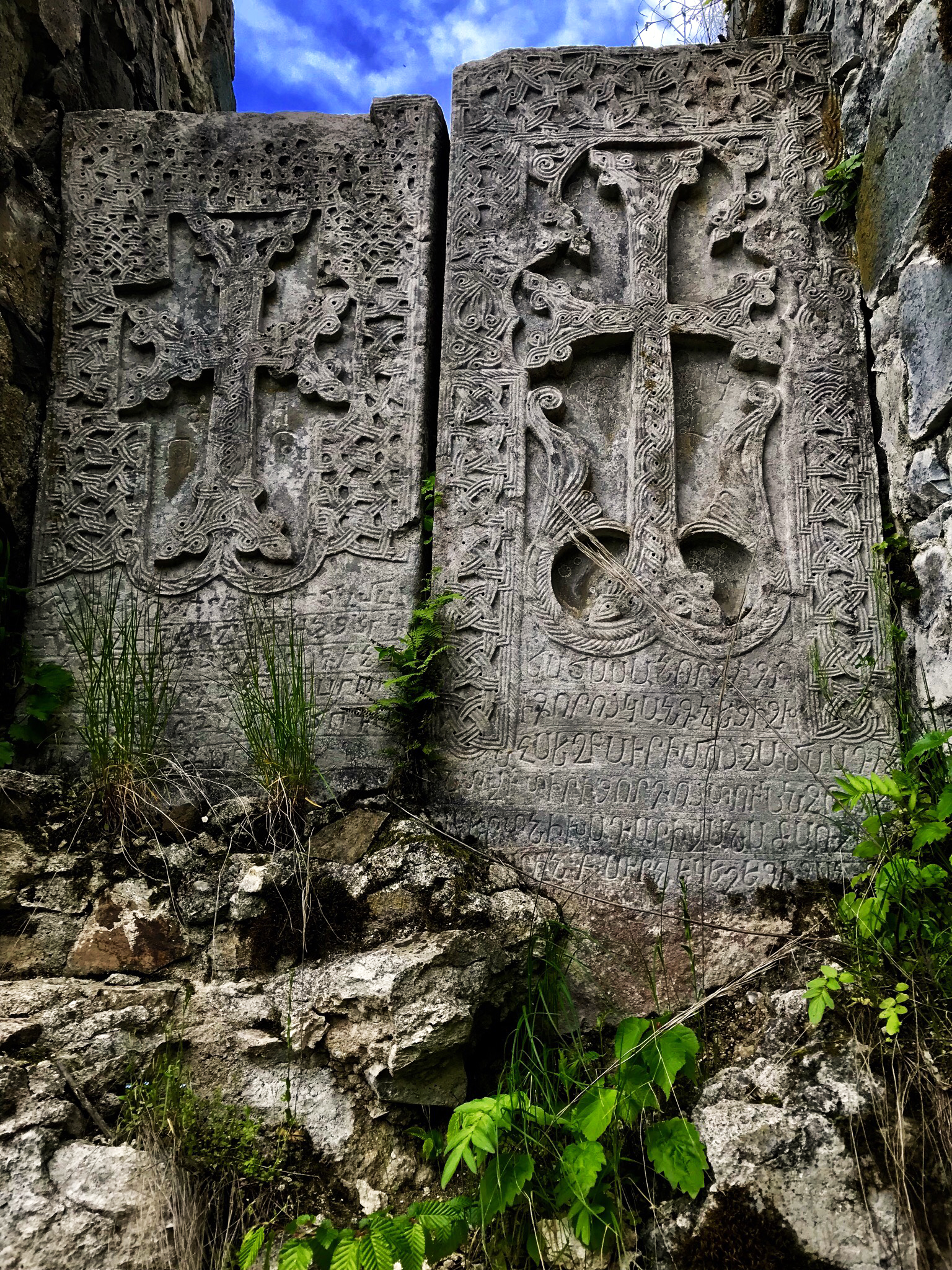
Khachkars of Khatravank

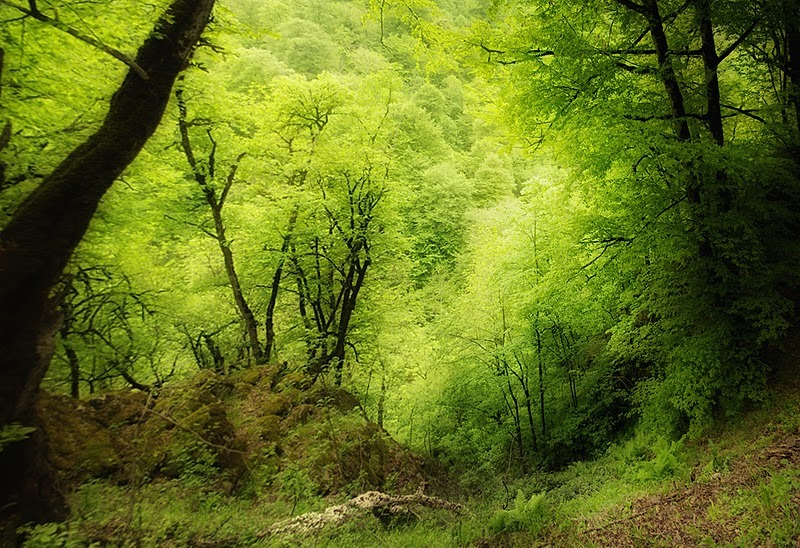
Forest near the village

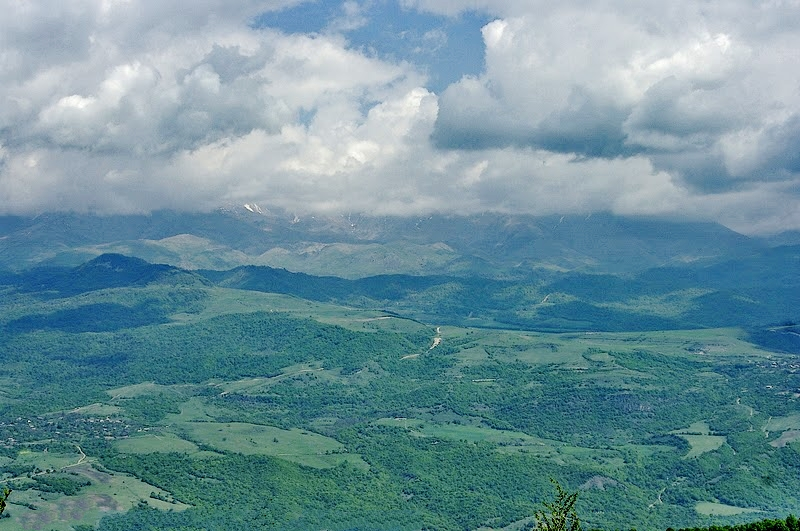
Aerial view of Vaghuhas

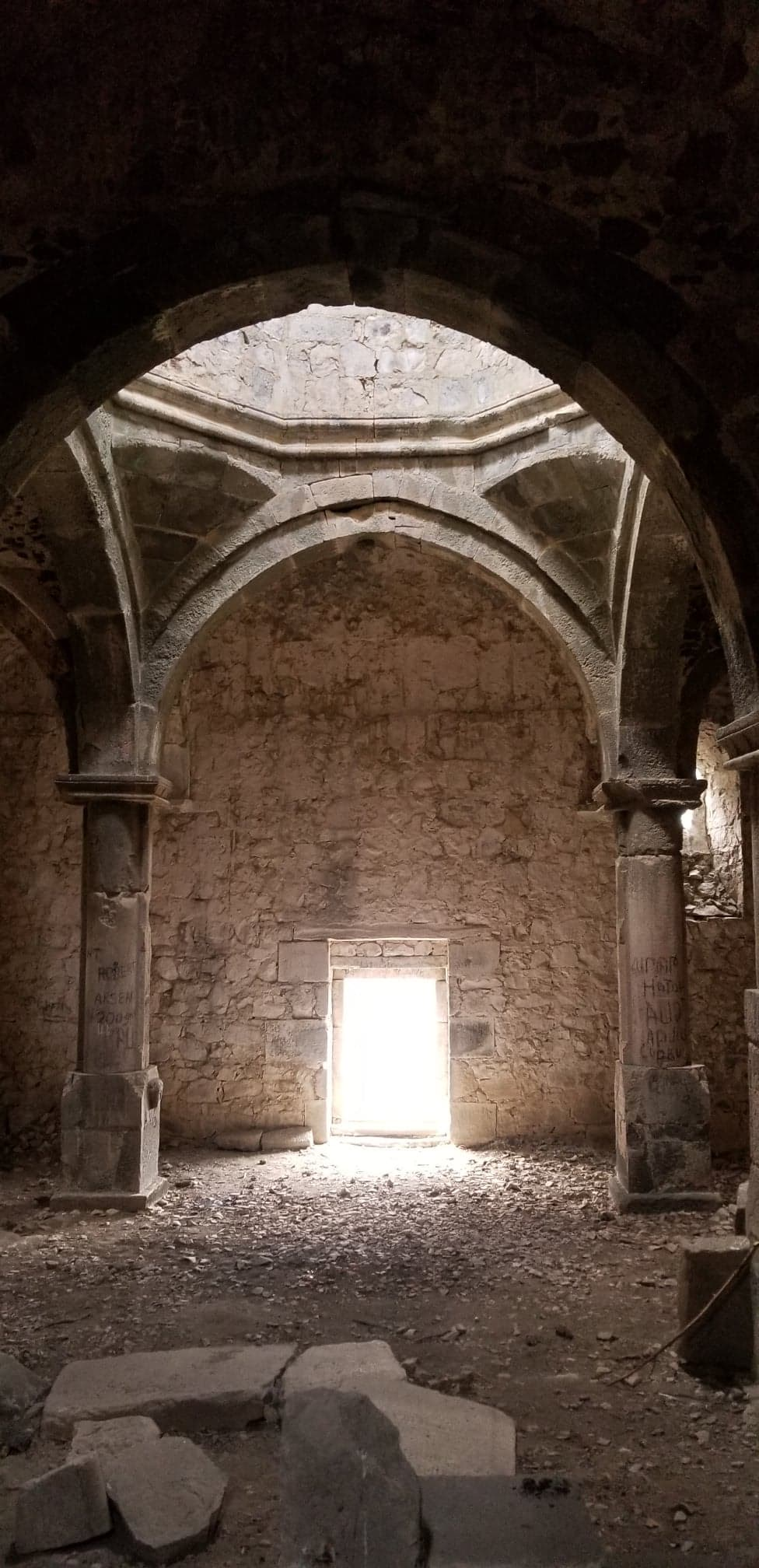
Interior of Khatravank

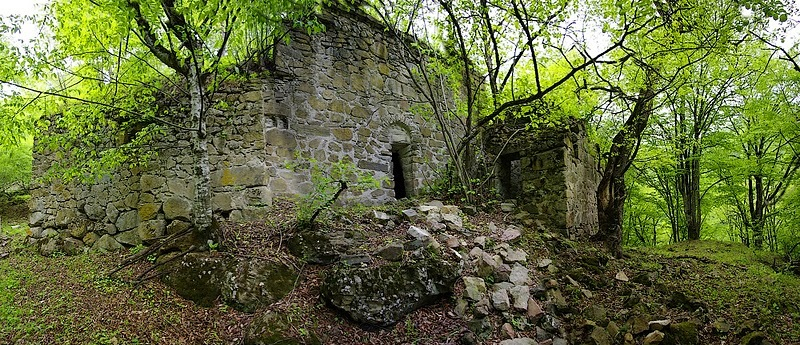
The 13th-century Karmiravan Monastery

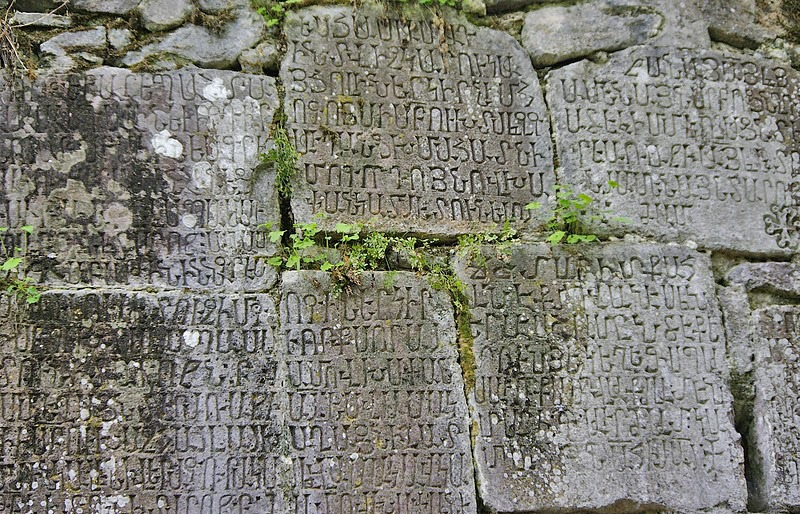
Inscriptions in Armenian on the walls of the Karmiravan Monastery
