= 2023 Azerbaijani offensive in Nagorno-Karabakh =

Azerbaijani offensive in Nagorno-Karabakh
- Part of the Nagorno-Karabakh conflict
- Military situation in Nagorno-Karabakh on 20 September 2023 Areas of internationally recognised Armenian territory occupied by Azerbaijan Areas captured by Azerbaijan during the offensive Areas of internationally recognised territory of Azerbaijan in Nagorno-Karabakh proper that were de facto under the control of Artsakh
Date	19–20 September 2023 (1 day)
Location	Nagorno-Karabakh
Result	Azerbaijani victory
Territorial changes	Azerbaijan regains control of Nagorno-Karabakh

Belligerents
Azerbaijan (Note: See § Foreign involvement for more details.)	Artsakh (Note: See § Foreign involvement for more details.)

Commanders and leaders
Ilham Aliyev	Samvel Shahramanyan

Casualties and losses
192 killed 511 wounded	200+ killed 400+ wounded
- Civilian and other; Azerbaijan: 1 killed, 1 injured; Artsakh: 10 killed, 40 injured; 100,617 ethnic Armenians fled Nagorno-Karabakh; 5 Russian peacekeepers killed (Note: Killed by Azerbaijan)

On 19 and 20 September 2023, Azerbaijan launched a large-scale military offensive against the self-declared breakaway state of Artsakh, violating the ceasefire agreement signed in the aftermath of the Second Nagorno-Karabakh War in 2020. The offensive took place in the disputed region of Nagorno-Karabakh, which is de jure a part of Azerbaijan, and was a de facto independent republic. The stated goal of the offensive was the complete disarmament and unconditional surrender of Artsakh, as well as the withdrawal of all Armenian soldiers present in the region. The offensive occurred in the midst of an escalating crisis caused by Azerbaijan's 10-month-long blockade of Artsakh, which resulted in significant scarcities of essential supplies such as food, medicine, and other goods.

One day after the offensive started on 20 September, a ceasefire agreement described as a written agreement for the surrender of Artsakh was reached at the mediation of the Russian peacekeeping contingent where it was agreed that the Artsakh Defence Army would be disarmed. Ceasefire violations by Azerbaijan were nonetheless reported by both Artsakhi residents and officials until early October. On 28 September, the president of Artsakh, Samvel Shahramanyan signed a decree to dissolve all state institutions by 1 January 2024, bringing the existence of the breakaway state to an end.

The offensive and subsequent surrender resulted in the expulsion of Nagorno-Karabakh Armenians, in which nearly the entire population fled to Armenia through the Lachin corridor. Human rights organizations and experts in genocide prevention issued multiple alerts (Note: Attributed to multiple references:) that the region's Armenian population was at risk or actively being subjected to ethnic cleansing and genocide, as well as war crimes and crimes against humanity.

== Background ==
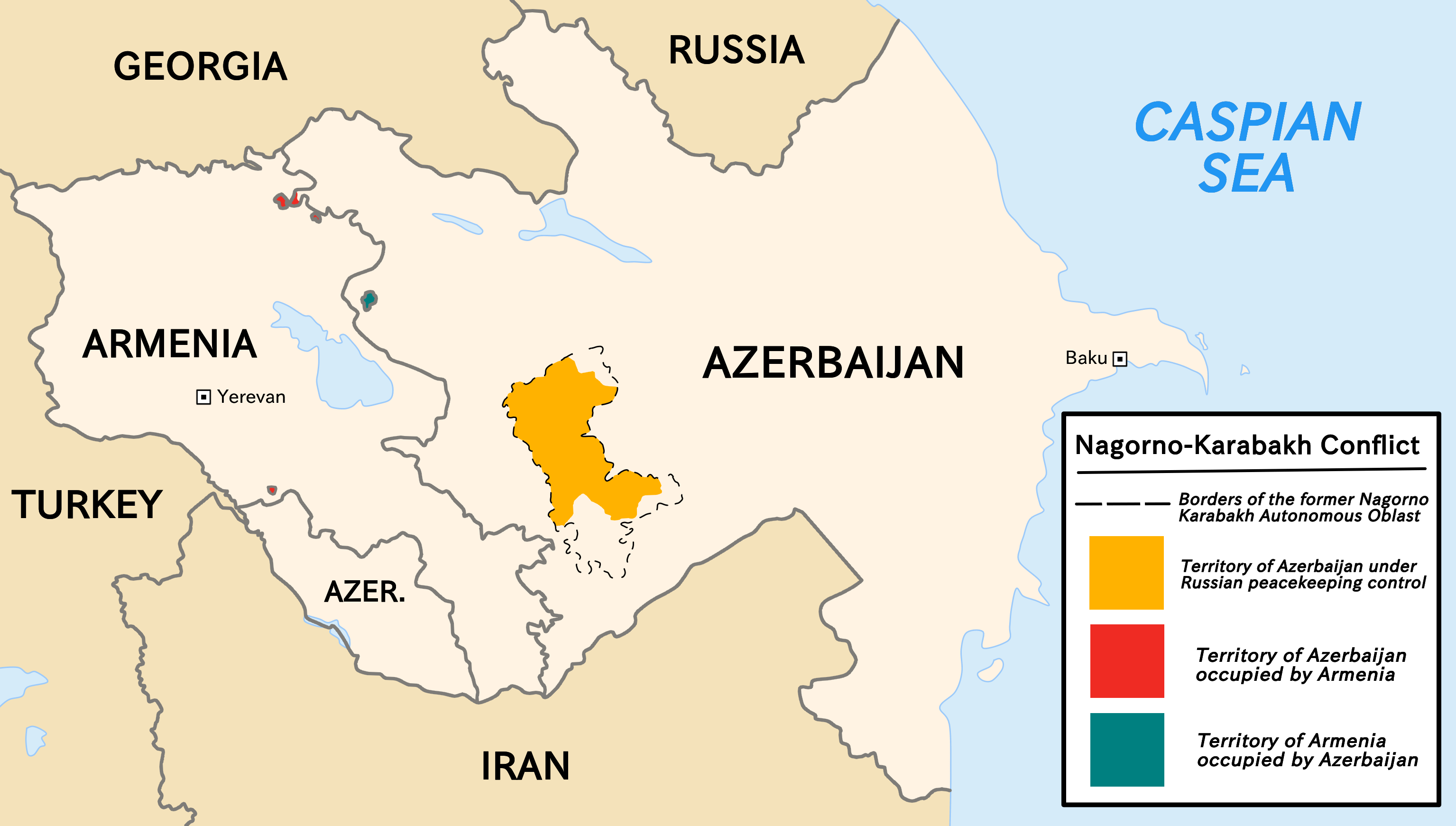
Situation in Nagorno-Karabakh following the 2020 ceasefire

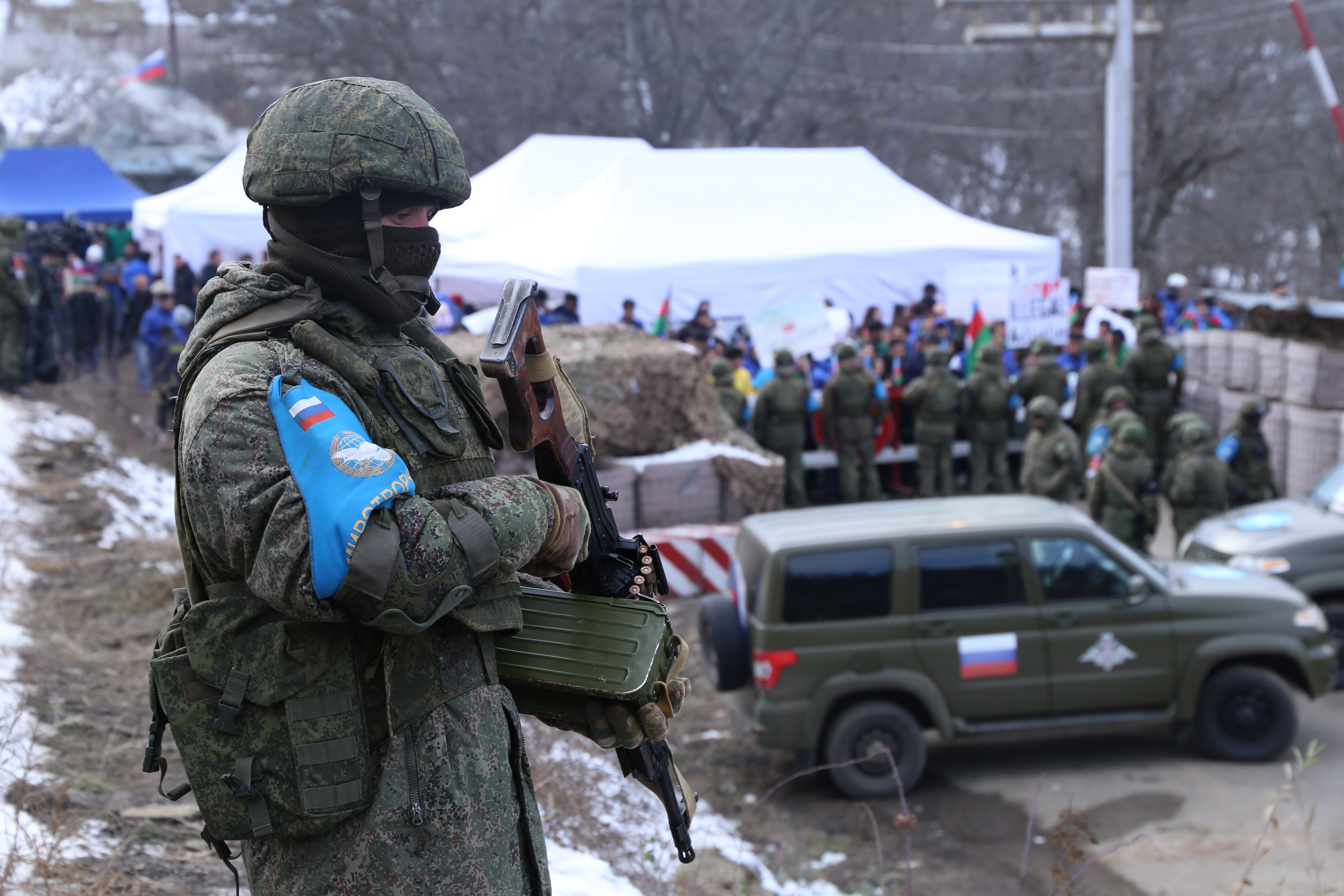
Russian peacekeepers patrolling the Lachin corridor

All the above efforts have only one goal: ensure irreversible normalization of relations between Baku and Yerevan for the benefit of all populations on the ground. It is now time for courageous compromise solutions, also in light of today's escalation.

— Spokesperson of Charles Michel, President of the European Council, on 1 September 2023.

The Nagorno-Karabakh conflict is an ethnic and territorial conflict between Armenia and Azerbaijan over the region of Nagorno-Karabakh, inhabited mostly by ethnic Armenians until the offensive. The Nagorno-Karabakh region was once entirely claimed by, and partially de facto controlled by the breakaway Republic of Artsakh, but is recognized internationally as part of Azerbaijan.

The conflict escalated in 1988, when the Karabakh Armenians demanded the transfer of the region from Soviet Azerbaijan to Soviet Armenia, triggering the First Nagorno-Karabakh War that ended in 1994 with Azerbaijan losing control of about 13.6% of its territory, including Nagorno-Karabakh, to Karabakh Armenians and the army of Armenia. In 1993, the United Nations Security Council adopted four resolutions that supported the territorial integrity of Azerbaijan and demanded the immediate withdrawal of the occupying Armenian forces from Azerbaijan, which was reaffirmed by the 2008 United Nations General Assembly Resolution 62/243.

In late 2020, the large-scale Second Nagorno-Karabakh War resulted in thousands of casualties and a significant Azerbaijani victory. An armistice was established by a tripartite ceasefire agreement on 10 November, resulting in Armenia and Artsakh ceding the territories surrounding Nagorno-Karabakh as well as one-third of Nagorno-Karabakh itself to Azerbaijan Ceasefire violations in Nagorno-Karabakh and on the Armenian–Azerbaijani border occurred following the 2020 war, leading to several casualties.

Subsequent to the 2020 war, Azerbaijan rescinded its offer of granting special status and autonomy to its ethnic Armenian residents and insisted on their "integration" into Azerbaijan. Several international mediators and human rights organizations advocated for self-determination for the local Armenian population and did not believe that Artsakh Armenians could live safely under the authoritarian regime of Azerbaijani President Ilham Aliyev, which is institutionally anti-Armenian.

== Prelude ==
In December 2022, Azerbaijan began blockading the Republic of Artsakh from the outside world, in violation of the 2020 ceasefire agreement and international legal rulings. The Azerbaijiani government seized territory around the Lachin corridor both within Artsakh and Armenia, blocked alternative bypass routes, and installed a military checkpoint. Azerbaijan also sabotaged critical civilian infrastructure of Artsakh, including gas, electricity, and internet access.

The blockade created a humanitarian crisis for the population of Artsakh. Imports of essential goods, including humanitarian convoys of the Red Cross and the Russian peacekeepers were blocked. 120,000 residents of the region were trapped. There were widespread shortages of essential goods, including electricity, fuel, and water reserves, and emergency reserves were rationed, alongside massive unemployment, and closures of schools and public transportation.

Azerbaijan claimed its actions were aimed at preventing the transportation of weapons and natural resources. It also said its goal was for Artsakh to "integrate" into Azerbaijan, despite opposition from the population, and threatened military action if the Artsakh government did not disband. The spokesperson for Charles Michel, President of the European Council called for the "irreversible normalization" of Armenian-Azerbaijani relations and "courageous compromise solutions".

Numerous countries, international organizations, and human rights observers condemned Azerbaijan's blockade and considered it to be a form of hybrid warfare and ethnic cleansing. Multiple international observers also considered the blockade and the inaction of the Russian peacekeepers to be violations of the tripartite 2020 Nagorno-Karabakh ceasefire agreement signed between Armenia, Azerbaijan, and Russia, which ended the Second Nagorno-Karabakh War and guaranteed safe passage for Armenia through the Lachin corridor. Azerbaijan and Russia ignored calls from various countries and international organizations to restore freedom of movement to Armenia through the corridor.

Two weeks before the clashes, the Lemkin Institute for Genocide Prevention issued a report stating that there was "alarming evidence that President [Ilham] Aliyev may be planning a military assault on Artsakh in the very near future." The report noted that Aliyev had recently signed a new decree ordering all eligible citizens 18 years of age or older to report for military service between 1 and 31 October 2023. The Lemkin Institute also warned that a "military assault on Artsakh could lead to the mass murder stage of genocide. It would almost assuredly result in the forced displacement of Armenians from Artsakh and the widespread commission of genocidal atrocities...[and]...Artsakh's Armenians would lose their distinct identity as Artsakhsis, an identity that has been forged through centuries—millennia—of independent cultural flourishing in their mountains and valleys."

== Offensive ==
=== 19 September ===
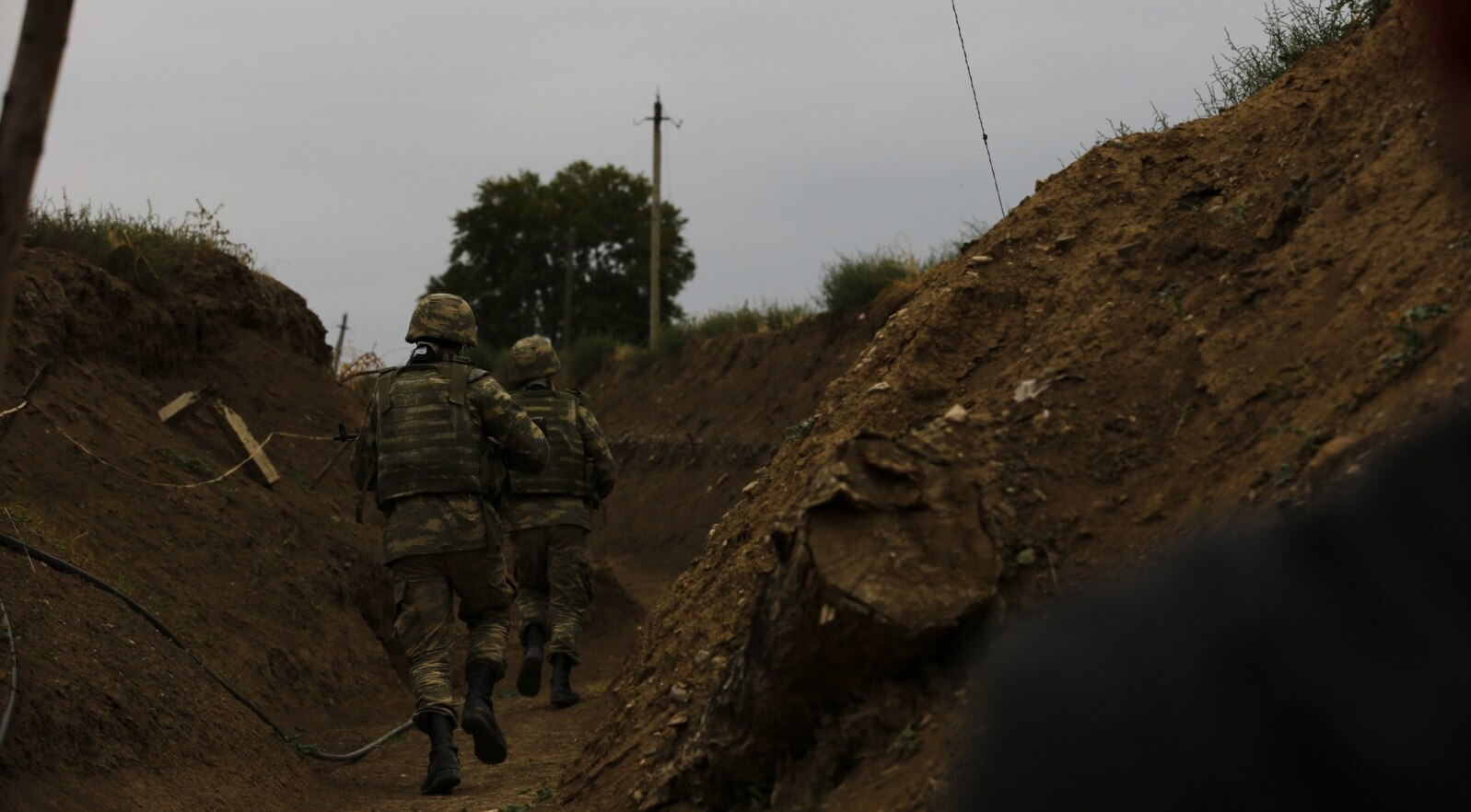
Azerbaijani soldiers in trenches

On 19 September 2023, in violation of the 2020 ceasefire, Azerbaijan launched a large-scale offensive against Republic of Artsakh. The Azerbaijan Ministry of Defense claimed to be undertaking "local anti-terrorist activities" and cited land mines allegedly planted by Armenians killing two Azerbaijani civilians and four police officers as a pretext for the offensive. The ministry demanded the disarmament and withdrawal of all ethnic Armenian soldiers, as well as the unconditional surrender and dissolution of the Republic of Artsakh. The statement from the ministry claimed that the Russian peacekeeping contingent and the joint Russian-Turkish Monitoring Centre were informed about the operation. Russia denied this claim, stating that its peacekeepers were only informed of the offensive a "few minutes" before it started.

Azerbaijan claimed that no civilian targets were attacked with weaponry, but witnesses reported strikes conducted in close proximity to large cities and densely populated areas. The attacks occurred in the midst of Azerbaijan's ongoing blockade of the region. Azerbaijan said that it had set up "humanitarian corridors and reception points on the Lachin road and in other directions" which would "ensure the evacuation of the population from the dangerous area". These announcements were disseminated through text messages, leaflets, and social media, triggering fears of ethnic cleansing amongst the residents. Artsakhi authorities warned its residents that "the Azerbaijani propaganda machine uses large-scale information and psychological influence measures." The Cyber Security Service of Azerbaijan temporarily restricted access to TikTok in Azerbaijan.

Late in the afternoon, Nagorno-Karabakh's leadership offered to negotiate with Azerbaijan after it launched its military offensive and called on Azerbaijan to "immediately cease the hostilities and sit down at the negotiation table with the aim of settling the situation". The Presidential Administration of Azerbaijan responded that it was ready to meet with representatives of Nagorno-Karabakh Armenians in the Azerbaijani town of Yevlakh. It stressed at the same time that the Azerbaijani offensive would continue unless Artsakh disband its government bodies and armed forces. The Azerbaijani Defence Ministry later stated that its forces had captured more than 60 military posts and destroyed up to 20 military vehicles. The Armenian daily Azg reported claims that Azerbaijan had captured the villages of Charektar and Getavan. The Prosecutor General's Office of Azerbaijan claimed that Armenian forces attacked Shusha with large-caliber weapons, killing one civilian.

Artsakh authorities stated that the state's de facto capital, Stepanakert, and other cities were being heavily shelled, accusing Azerbaijan of attempted ethnic cleansing. Artsakh's human rights ombudsman Gegham Stepanyan said two civilians, including a child, were killed, while 11 others were injured, eight of whom were children. By the end of the day, Artsakh reported that 27 people had been killed and more than 200 were injured.

Artsakh authorities reported that they had evacuated over 7,000 people from 16 rural settlements, while Russian peacekeepers evacuated 5,000 others. Russian Foreign Ministry spokesperson Maria Zakharova stated that Russian food and medicine arrived in Artsakh via the Lachin and Agdam routes.

=== 20 September ===
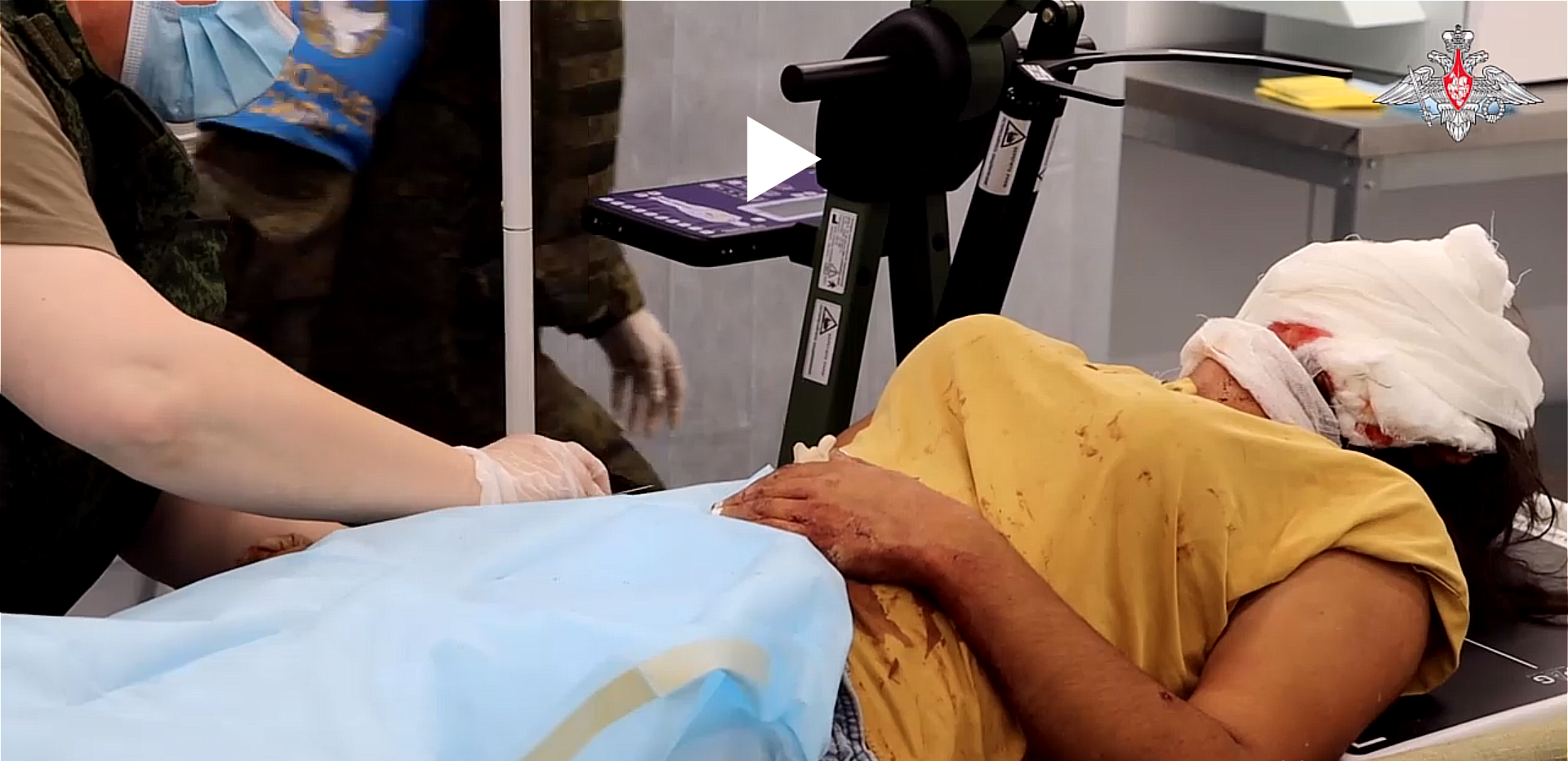
Wounded Armenian civilian

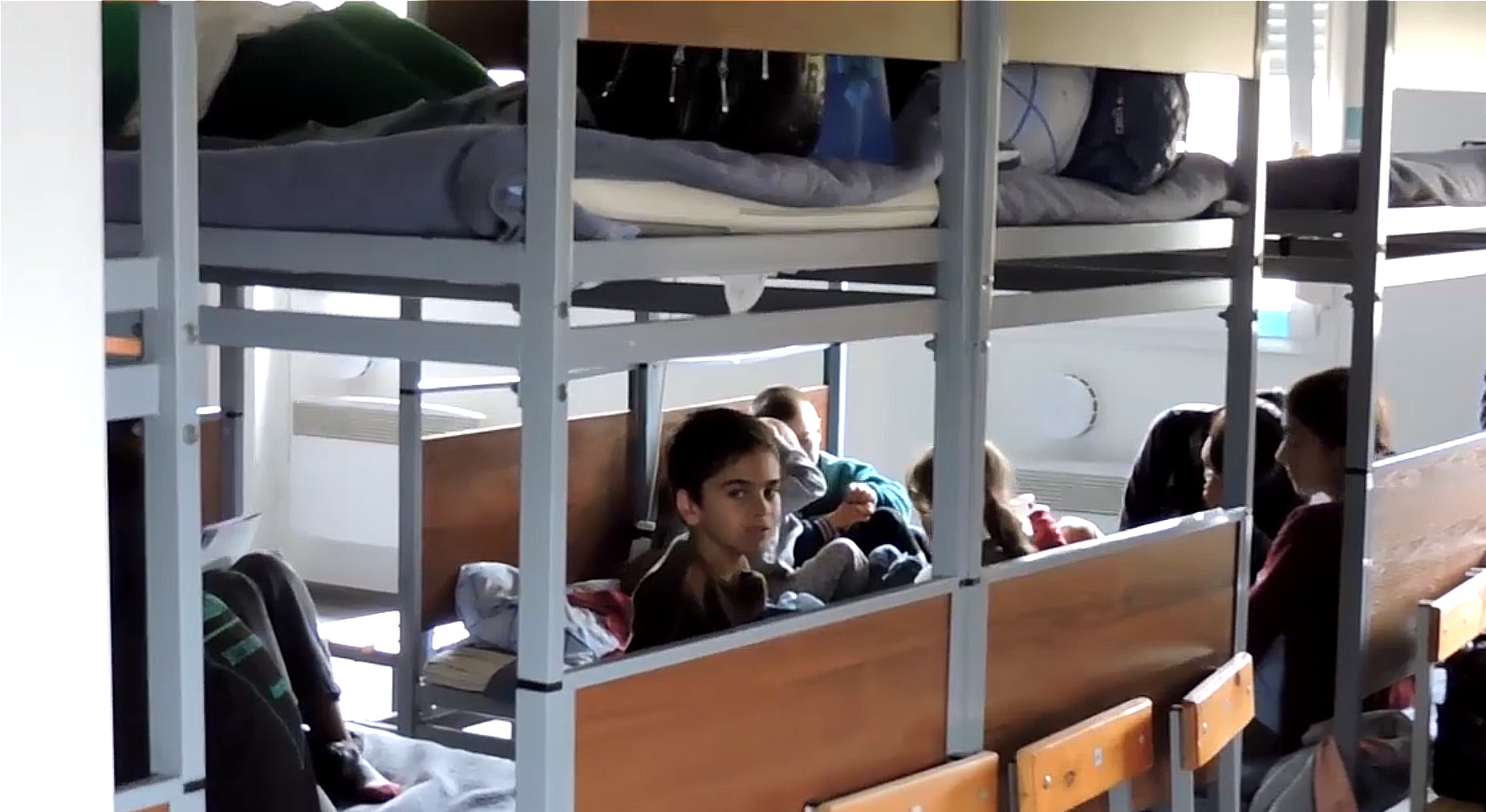
Armenian children hiding during the Azerbaijani attacks

Armenian sources reported that Aznavur Saghyan, the mayor of Martuni, was killed by an Azerbaijani sniper. It was also reported that the Amaras Monastery near Sos had fallen under Azerbaijani control. Azg reported that Azerbaijani forces had captured the settlements of Drmbon and Harav; later that day, Chankatagh, Chapar, Karmir Shuka, Khachmach, Machkalashen, Sarushen, Shosh and Vaghuhas were also reported to have been captured. Furthermore, the Armenian daily Aravot reported that the Kashen mine, one of the biggest sources of tax revenue for the Artsakhi government, had fallen under Azerbaijani control. Artsakhi president Samvel Shahramanyan said "Nagorno-Karabakh will have to take relevant steps to ensure physical security of population".

Artsakhi authorities agreed to a proposal by Russian peacekeeping forces to establish a ceasefire from 13:00 on 20 September. Under the terms of the agreement, the government of the Republic of Artsakh agreed to disarm and to enter into talks with the government of Azerbaijan regarding the reintegration of the territory. Among the Azerbaijani demands was a requirement for Artsakh and Armenia to surrender a list of individuals to Azerbaijan for prosecution and trial, including former and current Artsakhi civilian and military leaders. Large masses of Armenian civilians began fleeing Artsakh after the ceasefire announcement, with many of them gathering at Stepanakert Airport. Later, Nikol Pashinyan commented on this that "it is obvious to me that this is being done to cause internal political upheavals and chaos". The Armenian government said it was not involved in the drafting of the ceasefire agreement, while Azerbaijani presidential envoy Elchin Amirbeyov said that Russian peacekeepers helped facilitate the ceasefire.

Colonel Anar Eyvazov, Spokesperson for the Azerbaijani Defense Ministry, announced that during the operation, Azerbaijan had captured 90 combat positions. He also said that Azerbaijani forces had captured seven combat vehicles, one tank, four mortars and two infantry fighting vehicles from Armenian military units as trophies.

Shelling of Stepanakert continued until the city's electrical grid was knocked out several hours after the ceasefire was supposed to go into effect. According to a statement from the Russian Ministry of Defense, several peacekeepers were killed near the village of Chankatagh in Tartar District after their vehicle was attacked while they were returning from an observation post. Azerbaijani official Elin Suleymanov admitted that Azeri forces had killed the peacekeepers, calling it an accident, expressed condolences to Russia, and vowed to launch a probe into what happened. Among those killed was Captain First Rank Ivan Kovgan, the deputy commander of Russia's Northern Fleet submarine forces, and a concurrent deputy commander of the peacekeeping force. With Azerbaijani cooperation, Russian peacekeepers detained suspects, and an Azerbaijani commander was suspended. President Ilham Aliyev subsequently apologized over phone to Russian President Vladimir Putin for the incident. According to the Prosecutor General's Office of Azerbaijan, a group of military personnel of the Azerbaijan army opened fire on a car with Russian peacekeepers, mistaken believing they were Armenian forces due to the difficult terrain and foggy-rainy weather conditions. As a result, five peacekeepers were killed.

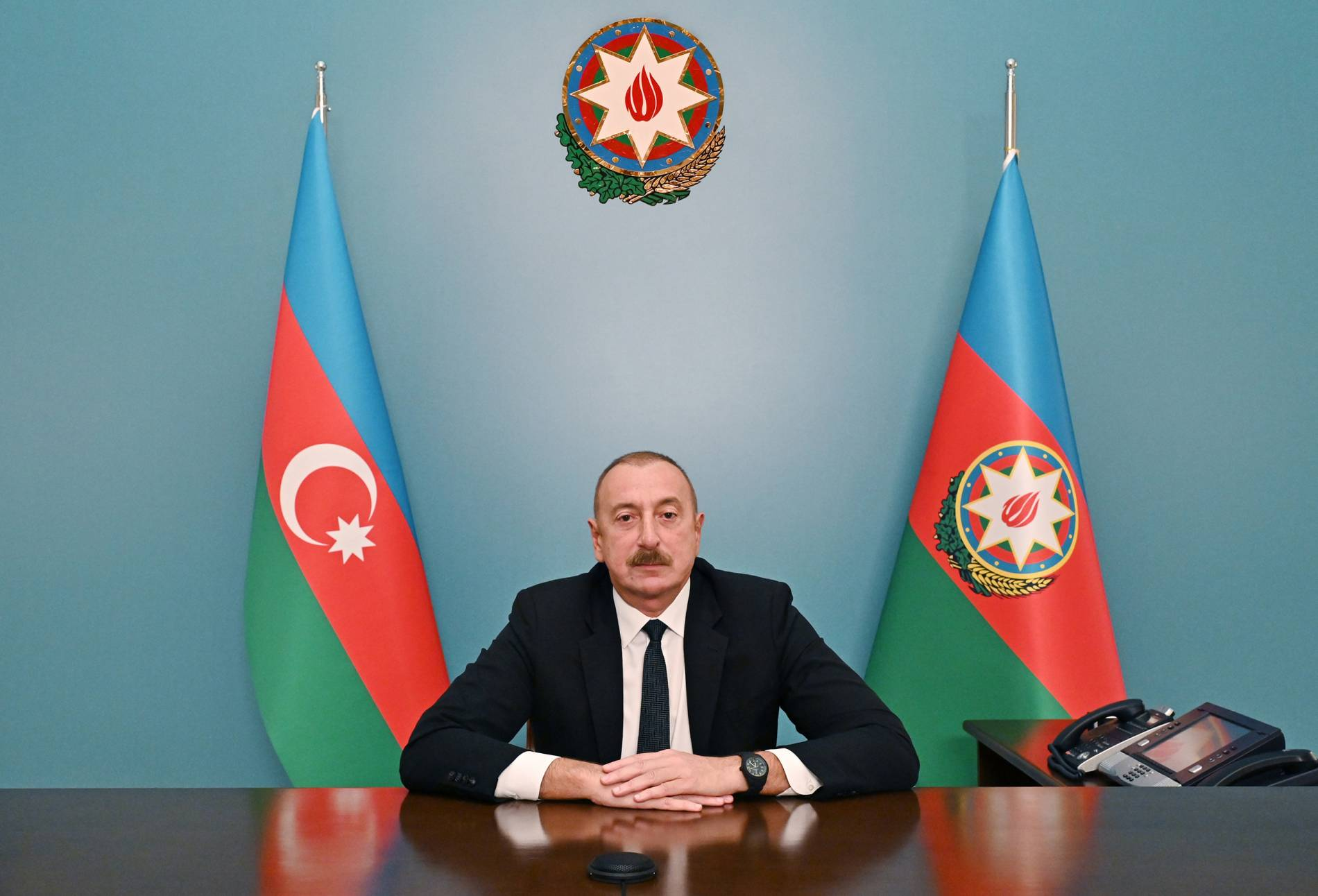
Ilham Aliyev addressing the nation on 20 September 2023

Armenia accused Azerbaijan of firing at its soldiers in the border town of Sotk, which Azerbaijan denied.

In a televised address that evening, President Aliyev reiterated that "Karabakh is Azerbaijan", adding that his "iron fist" had consigned the idea of Karabakh being a separate Armenian state to history.

== Aftermath ==
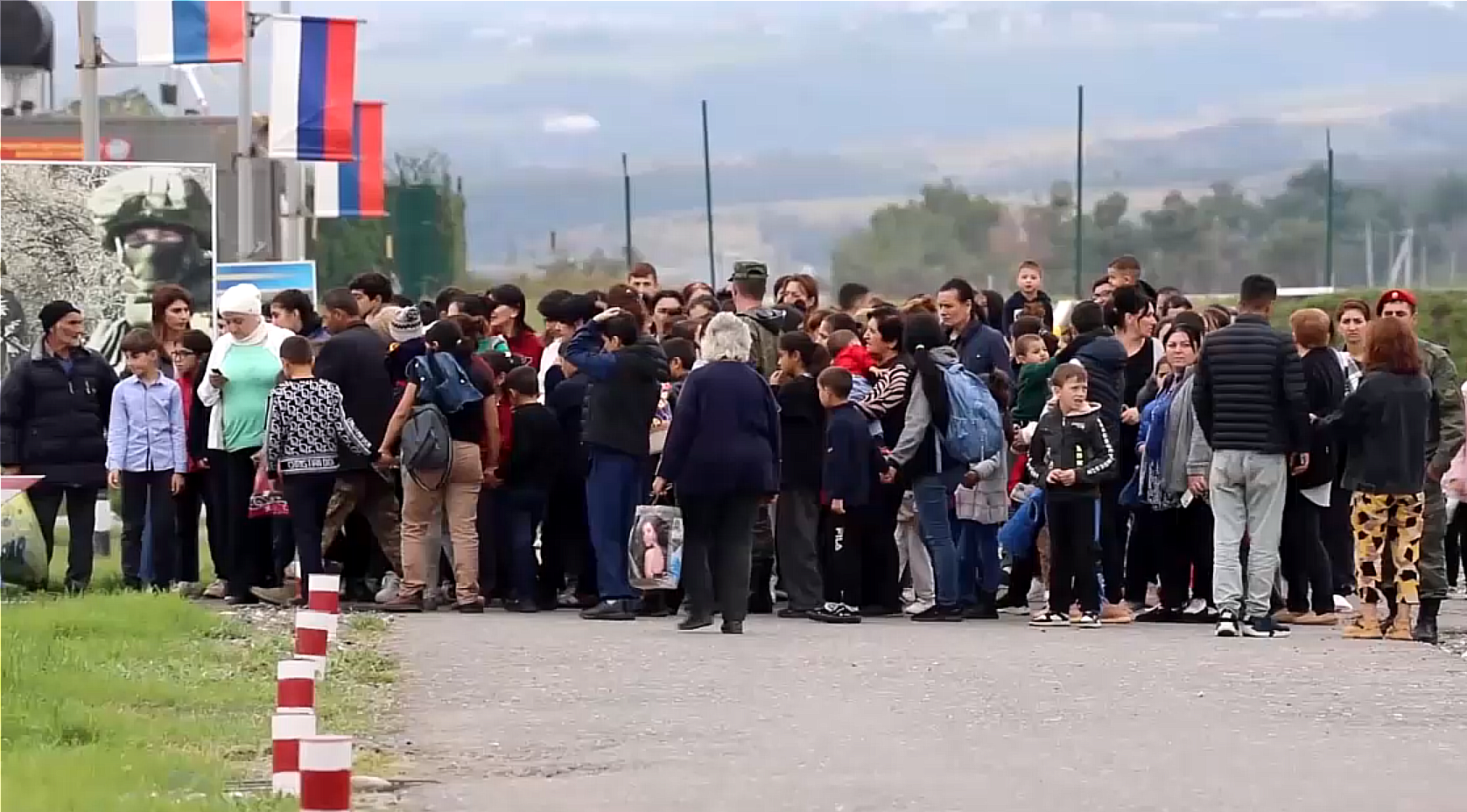
Armenians evacuated from their homes

=== Expulsion of Armenians from Nagorno-Karabakh ===
After the fighting ended on 21 September, Azerbaijan opened the border for the first time in months to allow people to leave, and tens of thousands of Armenians began to flee out through the military checkpoint at the Lachin corridor. On 24 September, Azerbaijan opened the Lachin corridor for residents of Nagorno-Karabakh to travel one-way to Armenia despite its ongoing blockade. A mass evacuation of ethnic Armenian civilians from the region then started, fearing persecution and ethnic cleansing if they remain. The first group of refugees arrived in Armenia through the border post at Kornidzor. By the end of the day, the Armenian government said 1,050 refugees had arrived in the country.

The last scheduled evacuation bus out of Nagorno-Karabakh left on 2 October carrying 15 refugees. On the same day, the Artsakhi government said that some officials would stay on until search operations for people killed and missing were completed. Journalists who visited Stepanakert said the city was virtually abandoned except for a few residents, Azerbaijani police officers and Russian peacekeepers. They also added that Azerbaijani telecommunications firms and signals were already present in the city. A United Nations report released the same day found that there were between 50 and 1,000 ethnic Armenians left in Nagorno-Karabakh. The Armenian government said the number of refugees from Nagorno-Karabakh had reached 100,617 on 3 October, nearly the entire current population of Nagorno-Karabakh. A total of 21,043 vehicles were recorded to have crossed the Hakari Bridge going to Armenia in the week since the exodus began.

The government of Artsakh said that families left homeless due to Azerbaijan's military offensive and who expressed a desire to leave Artsakh will be transferred to Armenia, accompanied by Russian peacekeepers. It was reported that 23 ambulances, accompanied by specialists and the Red Cross, were transporting 23 severely injured people from Artsakh to Armenia. In Armenia, the theatre in the city of Goris was converted into a base for the Red Cross to accommodate refugees. A secondary hub was later opened in Vayk. Armenian Health Minister Anahit Avanesian said some refugees died in transit due to exhaustion brought about by malnutrition, the lack of medicines and the travel time which took up to 40 hours. The Armenian government promised a one-off payment to each refugee of 100,000 drams and provide a monthly subsidy of 50,000 drams for at least six months, adding that it had so far managed to provided temporary accommodation for 53,000 refugees.

During the movement of refugees, at least 170 people were killed and more than 290 people were injured after an explosion at a fuel storage facility in Berkadzor, 6 kilometres (3.7 miles) from Stepanakert on 25 September. Most of the victims were queueing to obtain fuel for their vehicles while on their way to Armenia. Victims with various degrees of burns were treated in the Republican Medical Center of Artsakh, facilities of the Arevik community organization, medical facilities in Ivanyan, and the medical station of Russian peacekeepers. The Presidential Administration of Azerbaijan said it sent an ambulance carrying medical supplies. 142 of the injured were later brought to Armenia.

=== Arrests of Artsakhi officials ===
Azerbaijani forces were reported to be screening refugees fleeing to Armenia as part of its search for "war criminals" in border checkpoints. The Azerbaijani State Border Service detained several Artsakhi officials in the Lachin corridor while attempting to cross into Armenia, including former army commander and defence minister Levon Mnatsakanyan, former deputy army commander Davit Manukyan, and Russian-Armenian billionaire Ruben Vardanyan, who was the former state minister. Former foreign minister David Babayan surrendered to Azerbaijani authorities in Shusha. Azerbaijani presidential adviser Hikmat Hajiyev later confirmed that up to six people had been arrested on charges of committing "war crimes".

On 1 October, Azerbaijani Prosecutor-General Kamran Aliyev issued arrest warrants against former Artsakhi President Arayik Harutyunyan and military commander Jalal Harutyunyan over their role in the 2020 Ganja missile attacks during the Second Nagorno-Karabakh War, adding that 300 other separatist officials were under investigation for alleged war crimes.

On 3 October, the State Security Service of Azerbaijan detained former presidents Arkadi Ghukasyan, Bako Sahakyan and Arayik Harutyunyan, as well as President of the National Assembly Davit Ishkhanyan.

=== Negotiations and dissolution of Artsakh ===
On 21 September, negotiations between representatives of Nagorno-Karabakh and Azerbaijan took place in Yevlakh to discuss security, rights and "issues of re-integration". The Artsakhi delegation consisted of Sergey Martirosyan and Davit Melkumyan, and was escorted by Russian peacekeepers. The Azerbaijani delegation consisted of Ramin Mammadov, Bashir Hajiyev and Ilkin Sultanov. The head of the Joint Russian-Turkish Monitoring Center, Oleg Semyonov, was also present. The talks, which lasted two hours, ended without a formal agreement, however a statement from the Azerbaijani government said that they were "constructive and positive" and that further negotiations would continue in October. According to the Artsakhi delegation, the negotiations stalled due to a "whole host of questions", but specifically when they requested security guarantees that the Azerbaijani government would not force ethnic Armenians to leave the Nagorno-Karabakh region, however, both sides agreed on the cessation of military action. Azerbaijan agreed to send food and fuel supplies to the region.

On 22 September, Hikmet Hajiyev, foreign policy adviser to Azerbaijani president Ilham Aliyev, stated that his government would ensure that civilians can travel safely in their own vehicles on roads that connect Nagorno-Karabakh to Armenia. He also suggested that an amnesty would be offered to former combatants who agree to disarm. Some ethnic Armenian armed groups vowed to continue fighting. Rumors spread on some Internet news publications that these included former colonel Karen Jalavyan and his subordinates. A journalist from Hraparak contacted Jalavyan and asked him if the rumors were true, but he did not answer the question directly. Noticeably upset, he stated that "the entire nation has washed its hands from the people of Karabakh" and told Pashinyan to "go defend Artsakh".

The second day of negotiations also ended in deadlock despite the amnesty offer to Artsakhi commanders and fighters as the Artsakhi delegation stated the questions of humanitarian aid, security guarantees, and a promise from the Azerbaijani delegation to not drive Armenians from Nagorno-Karabakh were unresolved. According to Armenian journalist Tatul Hakobyan, a meeting between the head of State Security Service of Azerbaijan, Ali Naghiyev, and Artsakh's president Samvel Shahramanyan took place in Shusha.

Elements of the Artsakh defense force began transferring their weapons to Russian peacekeepers, with the Russian defence ministry confirming the turnover of six armored vehicles, more than 800 small arms units and 5,000 rounds of ammunition. The memorial tank monument, a restored T-72 tank of Gagik Avsharyan commemorating the capture of Shusha and located on Shusha road, was reportedly dismantled by Azerbaijan. Additionally, a convoy of 15 trucks from the Russian peacekeepers left Armenia for Nagorno-Karabakh, crossing the Lachin corridor. More than 50 tonnes of humanitarian aid was delivered to Nagorno-Karabakh by Russian peacekeepers, according to the Russian defence ministry. On 24 September, the town of Martakert was reported to have come under Azerbaijani military control.

A second round of negotiations between representatives of Nagorno-Karabakh Armenians and Azerbaijan took place in Khojaly, where according to Azerbaijan, humanitarian issues were discussed. The two sides agreed to a third meeting taking place in a few days time.

On 26 September, Azerbaijani forces reportedly took control of Martuni (Khojavend).

On 28 September, Artsakh president Samvel Shahramanyan signed a decree stating that all state institutions would be dissolved by 1 January 2024, bringing the existence of the breakaway republic to an end. However, on 22 December, Shahramanyan, who was by then in exile in the Armenian capital Yerevan, said that there was "no document... of the Republic of Artsakh (Karabakh) stipulating the dissolution of government institutions," while his office said that the decree issued in September was "empty paper," adding that "no document can lead to the dissolution of the republic, which was established by people's will."

Azerbaijani media reported on 29 September that a third meeting between representatives of the Karabakh Armenian community and officials from the government of Azerbaijan took place in Yevlakh. Azerbaijani police vehicles were seen in Stepanakert and officials placed the Azerbaijani flag on the city's We Are Our Mountains monument.

A fourth round of talks was held in Stepanakert on 2 October, during which Azerbaijani authorities outlined their plans for the "reintegration" of the region.

On 3 October, Azerbaijani officials were reported to have reissued a 2021 map of Stepanakert renaming one of its streets after Enver Pasha, one of the main perpetrators of the Armenian genocide. When approached for comment, the State Service on Property Issues of the Ministry of Economy of Azerbaijan and the State Committee on Urban Planning and Architecture of Azerbaijan stated they were unaware of any street renaming initiated by Azerbaijani authorities in Stepanakert.

On 15 October, President Ilham Aliyev visited Stepanakert and raised the Azerbaijani flag. A video was also released showing him stepping on an Artsakhi flag placed on the floor in the building that housed the former government.

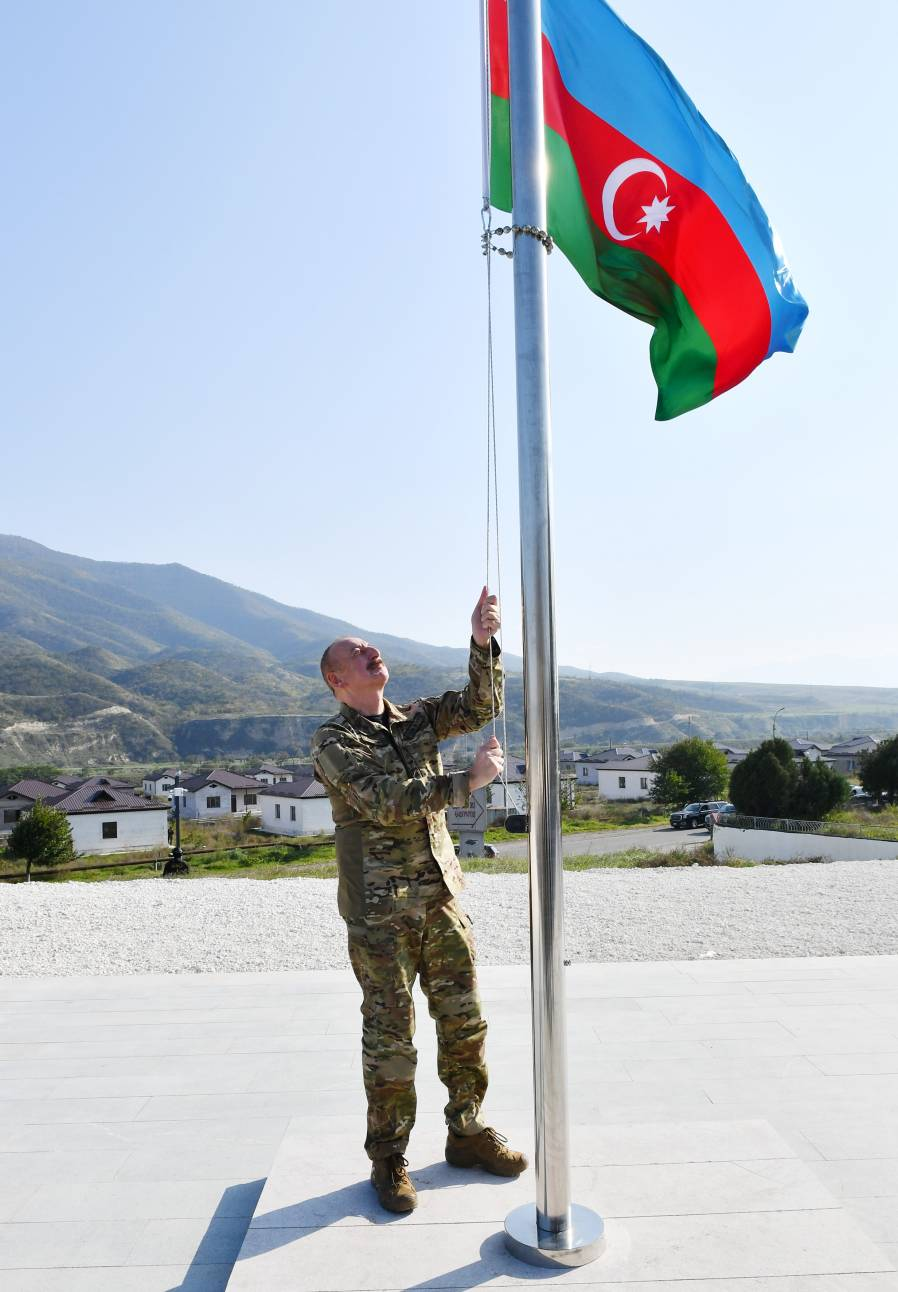
Ilham Aliyev raising the flag of Azerbaijan in Khojaly, a town previously controlled by Artsakh until the offensive

=== Ceasefire violations ===
The Artsakh Ministry of Internal Affairs stated on 21 September that the Azerbaijani military violated the ceasefire and continued to shell Stepanakert "with different types of small arms". Rheinische Post reported ceasefire violations by Azerbaijani forces and gunfire in Stepanakert, according to residents. It was reported that electricity in Artsakh cannot be supplied because a number of substations that feed the electrical grid were under Azerbaijani control, with "Artsakhenergo" CJSC carrying out restoration works in Stepanakert. Russia recorded two instances of ceasefire violations in Shusha District and three other instances in Mardakert District. Artak Beglaryan, former Artsakhi Minister of State, reported that Karkijahan, a suburb of Stepanakert, was "empty" following a ceasefire violation. Many residents took refuge in Stepanakert itself. He stated that Azerbaijani troops entered several houses in the neighborhood. To avoid further tensions, Russian peacekeepers were deployed in the outskirts of Stepanakert, including in Karkijahan. Artsakhi armed forces were also deployed to the area.

On 22 September, Artsakhi government spokesperson Armine Hayrapetyan told Agence-France Presse that Azerbaijani forces had positioned themselves around Stepanakert, prompting residents to hide in basements for fear of killings. She also added that since the Azerbaijani offensive, Stepanakert and other parts of Nagorno-Karabakh have lost most basic services such as electricity, gas, food, fuel, internet and telephone connections.

On 23 September, the Russian Ministry of Defense said one ceasefire violation was recorded in the Mardakert region, which resulted in one Azerbaijani soldier being injured following a shootout.

On 24 September, the Azerbaijani Defence Ministry claimed that two of its soldiers were killed after their truck hit a landmine.

On 30 September, Azerbaijan claimed that one of its soldiers was killed by an Armenian army sniper in Aşağı Ayrım, Kalbajar District, which Armenia immediately denied.

On 2 October, Armenia accused Azerbaijani forces of opening fire on a vehicle delivering food to military outposts around the village of Kut, killing a soldier and injuring two others. On the same day, the Russian Defence Ministry said that a joint Russian-Azerbaijani patrol in Stepanakert was shot at by an unidentified sniper without causing any injury.

On 5 October, Armenia and Azerbaijan accused each other of firing at military targets on each other's territory.

=== Humanitarian aid ===
On 22 September, Azerbaijan said it had sent two 20-tonne trucks with food and hygiene products and well as two trucks with bread to Nagorno-Karabakh from Aghdam.

For the first time since the Azerbaijani offensive, a Red Cross aid convoy was spotted at the Armenia–Azerbaijan border heading for Nagorno-Karabakh on 23 September. The Red Cross later evacuated 17 people who were injured during the clashes. In a separate delivery, Russia sent 50 tons of aid to Stepanakert.

On 28 September, USAID sent a Disaster Assistance Response Team to the region to help coordinate the U.S. humanitarian response.

Other countries and international organizations that have provided humanitarian assistance to civilians in Nagorno-Karabakh and to ethnic Armenians that have fled the region include Argentina, Australia, Canada, the Czech Republic, Denmark, the European Union, France, Greece, Hungary, Japan, Iran, Italy, Norway, Poland, Spain, Sweden, Switzerland, and the United Kingdom. Cyprus offered to shelter some of the displaced Armenians who have fled the region.

=== Diplomatic efforts ===
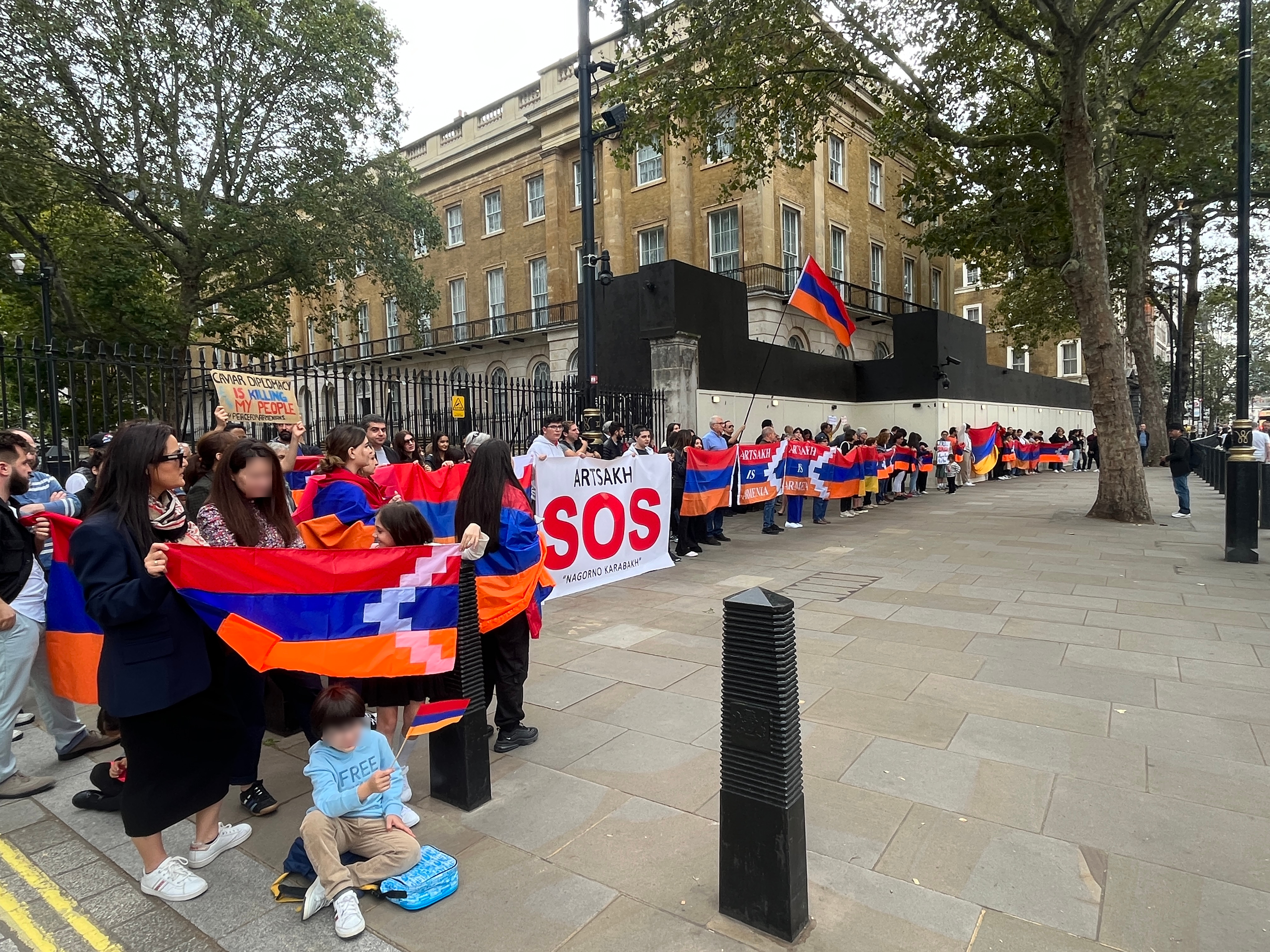
Armenian protesters in London

At a meeting of the United Nations Security Council, Armenia proposed that a United Nations peacekeeping mission should be deployed to Nagorno-Karabakh and called for the establishment of an international mechanism for dialogue between Azerbaijan and representatives of the ethnic Armenian community in the region.

On 26 September, a meeting between Armen Grigoryan, head of Armenia's Security Council and Hikmat Hajiyev, Foreign Policy Advisor to the President of Azerbaijan, was hosted by the European Union in Brussels. At the meeting the EU emphasized the need for access for humanitarian and human rights organizations into Nagorno-Karabakh. It also wanted more details about the Azerbaijani government's plans for the future of Karabakh Armenians in Azerbaijan. Azerbaijan outlined its plans to provide humanitarian assistance and security to the local population in the region. On the same day, United States Secretary of State Antony Blinken spoke with President Aliyev by telephone and urged him to refrain from further hostilities and to allow an international observer mission into Nagorno-Karabakh. German foreign minister Annalena Baerbock also urged that independent observers be allowed into the region. Russia insisted that any international observer mission in the region can only happen with permission from the government of Azerbaijan.

On 27 September, US State Department spokesperson Matthew Miller announced the government of Azerbaijan had given assurances that it would welcome an international monitoring mission to the region and that the United States and its allies would discuss the composition and mandate of such a mission in the coming days.

Azerbaijan announced on 29 September that it would facilitate a visit by United Nations observers to the region "in the coming days". The UN later confirmed that it would send a mission to Nagorno-Karabakh for the first time in 30 years to address humanitarian needs. On the same day, Armenia formally requested the International Court of Justice to order Azerbaijan to withdraw its troops from civilian areas of Nagorno-Karabakh to ensure safe access by UN personnel. It later petitioned the court to impose 10 "provisional measures" aimed at protecting the rights of ethnic Armenians from Nagorno-Karabakh and prevent Azerbaijan's "ethnic cleansing" of the region from becoming irreversible. On 17 November, the court ruled that Azerbaijan had an obligation to allow the return of residents who fled following the offensive and protect those who had stayed behind.

The United Nations in Azerbaijan, led by the UN Resident Coordinator in Azerbaijan Vladanka Andreeva, sent a mission to Nagorno-Karabakh to address humanitarian needs on 1 October. While visiting Stepanakert, the team claimed to have found no evidence of damage to public infrastructure in the areas it visited. The mission saw that the Azerbaijani government was preparing for the resumption of health services and some utilities. The mission reportedly "was struck by the sudden manner in which the local population left their homes". It was reported to the team that between 50 and 1,000 ethnic Armenians remain in the region. It encountered no civilian vehicles on the Lachin road to the border crossing used by the refugees. The mission also had limited access to rural areas. The mission was criticized for failing to mention the numerous casualties and injuries among Armenian civilians, the targeting of civilian infrastructure by Azerbaijan, and blockade of Nagorno-Karabakh by Azerbaijan over the previous nine months along with the humanitarian crisis it caused. The delegation returned to the region on 9 October.

On 4 January 2024, the US State Department placed Azerbaijan on its watchlist on religious freedom, following a recommendation by the US Commission on International Religious Freedom over concerns for the preservation of Christian religious sites in Nagorno-Karabakh following the Azerbaijani takeover and government oversight in religious activities.

==== Normalisation efforts ====
On 7 December, Armenia and Azerbaijan agreed to hold a prisoner exchange and move towards normalising relations, stating in a joint statement their agreement to seize "a historical chance to achieve a long-awaited peace in the region". The exchange was conducted on 13 December, with two Azerbaijani soldiers being released in return for 32 Armenian soldiers.

Several countries have offered themselves to become a mediator between both sides in their peace talks and normalisation efforts, such as Georgia, Iran, the European Union and the United States. Armenian Prime Minister Nikol Pashinyan and Azerbaijan President Ilham Aliyev have met several times for talks mediated by the EU, but progress towards normalisation stalled when Aliyev refused to attend French-mediated talks in Spain on October and U.S.-mediated talks in Washington D.C. on November, claiming both mediators had a "biased" position.

Iran hosted talks between the foreign ministries of Armenia and Azerbaijan in Tehran on October, with Turkey and Russia also participating. Georgia was invited to the talks but refused to attend. Iranian president Ebrahim Raisi emphasized Iran's rejection of "interference by Western powers in the Caucasus," signifying the country's discontent with U.S.- and EU–mediated talks.

== Risk of genocide ==
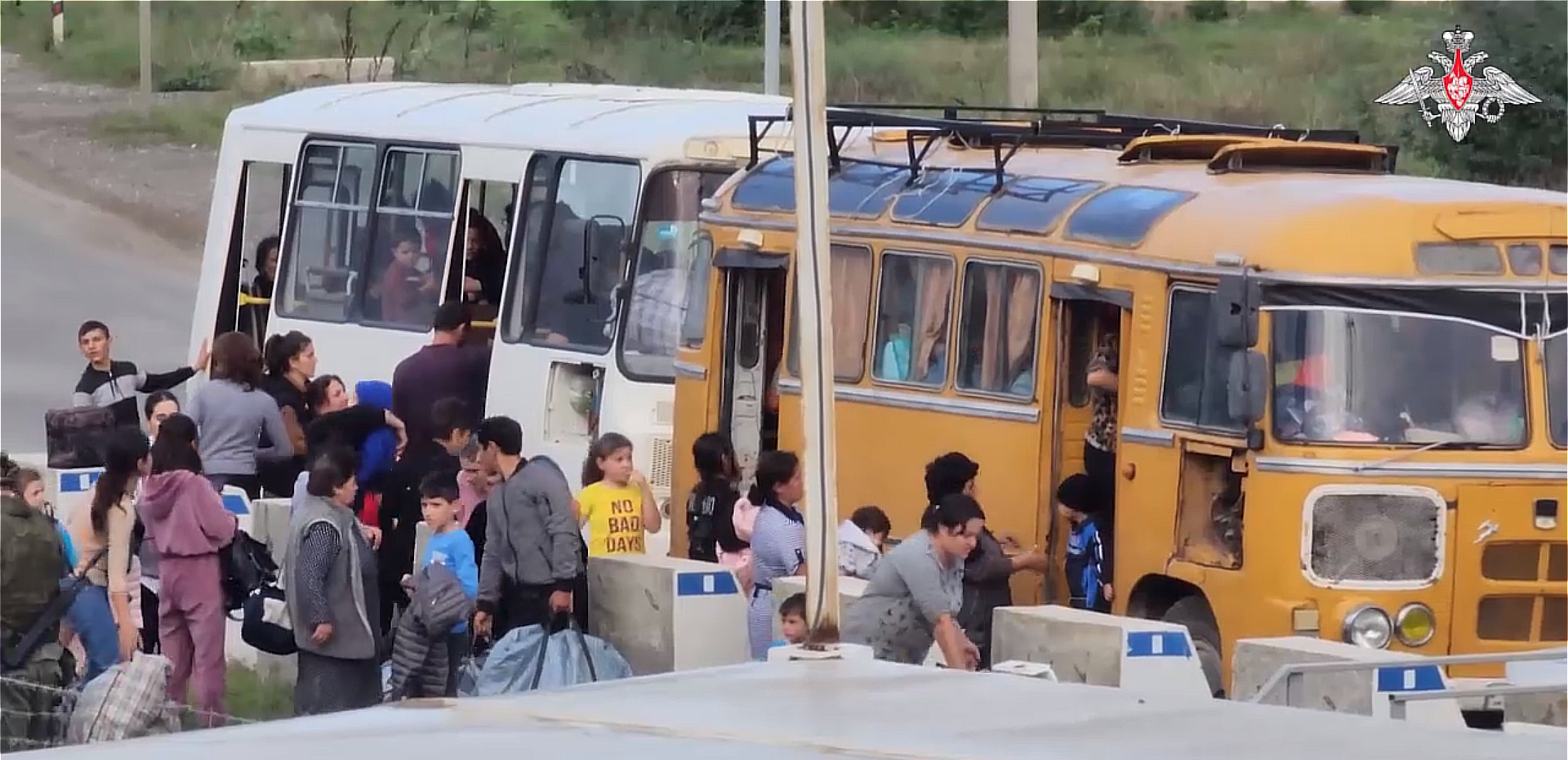
Armenians seeking refuge due to attacks by Azerbaijani forces

Human rights organizations and experts in genocide prevention issued alerts stating that the ethnic Armenian population in Nagorno-Karabakh was at risk of genocide, (Note: Attributed to multiple references:) while others stated that Azerbaijan was already carrying out such actions. The Lemkin Institute for Genocide Prevention states "There is no doubt in the minds of experts in genocide prevention – at the Lemkin Institute, but also at Genocide Watch, the International Association of Genocide Scholars, and among legal experts such as former ICC chief prosecutor Luis Moreno Ocampo – that what Armenians are facing from Azerbaijan is genocide." Experts in genocide prevention have stated that Azerbaijan's ongoing blockade of Artsakh and sabotage of public infrastructure constitutes genocide under Article II, (c) of the Genocide Convention, "Deliberately inflicting on the group conditions of life calculated to bring about its physical destruction". There are various indicators that Azerbaijan possesses genocidal intent: President Aliyev's public statements, his regime's openly Armenophobic practices and noncompliance with the International Court of Justice orders to end the blockade.

Christian Solidarity International emphasized that the "United States has had ample notice of the forced deportation that is now unfolding in Nagorno Karabakh, starting with Genocide Watch Emergency Alerts in 2020, 2021, 2022, and a Genocide Warning issued by the Save Karabakh Coalition in December 2022. These warnings were followed by two Genocide Emergency Alerts issued by Genocide Watch in 2023, and a declaration of genocide by the first Chief Prosecutor of the International Criminal Court, Luis Moreno Ocampo." Thomas de Waal, a senior fellow at Carnegie Europe, commented on Azerbaijan's ongoing nine-month long blockade of the region: "Armenians fear that this is a prelude to an Azerbaijani attempt to fully drive them all out of their homeland."

=== Reports of violence against Armenians ===
Kavita Belani, United Nations Refugee Agency Representative in Armenia, who spoke with Karabakh Armenians in Armenia, stated on 29 September 2023 that "there were no recorded incidents or cases of mistreatment against people on the move". A UN mission that visited Nagorno-Karabakh on 1 October 2023 reported that "they did not come across any reports — either from the local population or from others — of violence against civilians following the latest ceasefire."

Lawyer Anoush Baghdassarian was onsite in Goris to interview Armenian refugees and document possible war crimes and crimes against humanity. On 19 October 2023, Anahit Manasyan, the Human Rights Defender of Armenia, announced that the bodies of numerous Armenian civilians massacred in Nagorno-Karabakh had been transported to Armenia. Manasyan stated that the bodies showed signs of torture and included women and children.

== International aspects ==
=== Reactions ===
==== Armenia ====
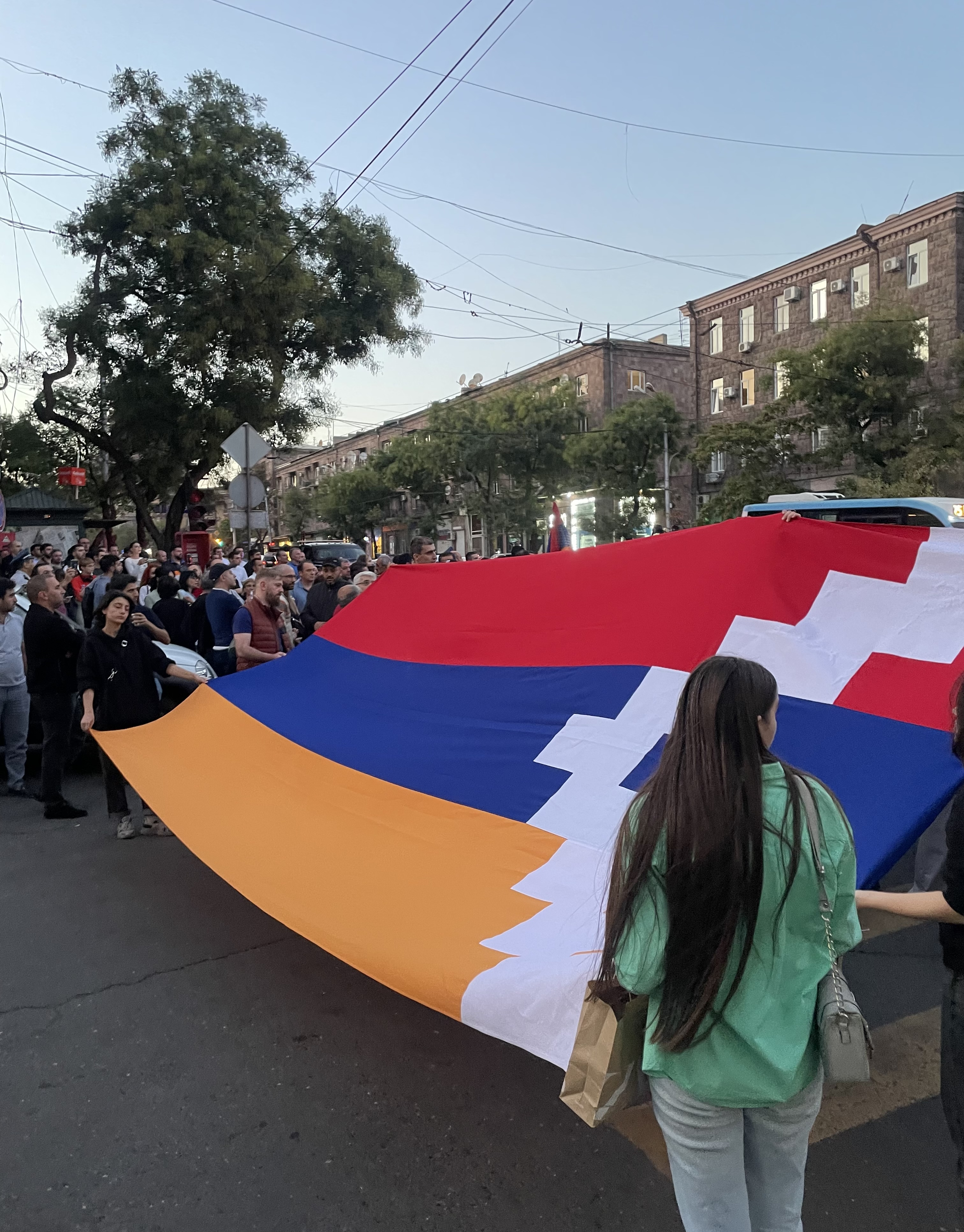
Protesters in front of the Russian embassy in Yerevan carried the Artsakh flag.

Armenian Prime Minister Nikol Pashinyan reiterated that the situation in the Armenia-Azerbaijan border was stable and said that Azerbaijan was trying to ethnically cleanse the region. Pashinyan also said that Azerbaijan's motivation for the attack was to draw Armenia into a military confrontation. Following the ceasefire on 20 September, Pashinyan said the country was preparing for an influx of 40,000 families from Nagorno-Karabakh. The Armenian foreign ministry accused Azerbaijan of unleashing "large-scale aggression" against Karabakh and attempting "ethnic cleansing" in the region. Armenia called on the United Nations Security Council and Russia to take action to end the military operation, while Pashinyan called an emergency meeting of the country's National Security Council. The council's secretary, Armen Grigoryan, accused Russian peacekeepers of failing to protect Nagorno-Karabakh, which was also echoed by Pashinyan. Following the announcement of the ceasefire, protests erupted in the capital Yerevan over the impending loss of Nagorno-Karabakh. The pro-Western National Democratic Alliance blamed the situation on Russia's failure to intervene, while members of the pro-Russian political opposition blamed Pashinyan for the defeat and accused him of betraying Nagorno-Karabakh's residents "in favor of the interests of the West."

On 3 October, the National Assembly of Armenia voted 60–22 in favor of ratifying the Rome Statute, which would enable Armenia to join the International Criminal Court. Although the government claimed that the move to create additional guarantees for Armenia in response to Azerbaijani aggression, it was also seen as a sign of worsening relations with Russia, whose president, Vladimir Putin, is wanted by the court on charges of war crimes in the invasion of Ukraine. The measure was signed into law by President Vahagn Khachaturyan on 14 October.

On 28 November 2023, the president of the National Assembly of Armenia Alen Simonyan stated that the Nagorno-Karabakh conflict is over and Armenia should not prioritize the quick return of the recently displaced Karabakh Armenians to their homes in peace talks with Azerbaijan. Simonyan confirmed that "Armenia fully recognizes the territorial integrity of Azerbaijan, including Nagorno-Karabakh." On 1 February 2024, Armenia became the 124th member of the International Criminal Court.

===== Armenian diaspora =====
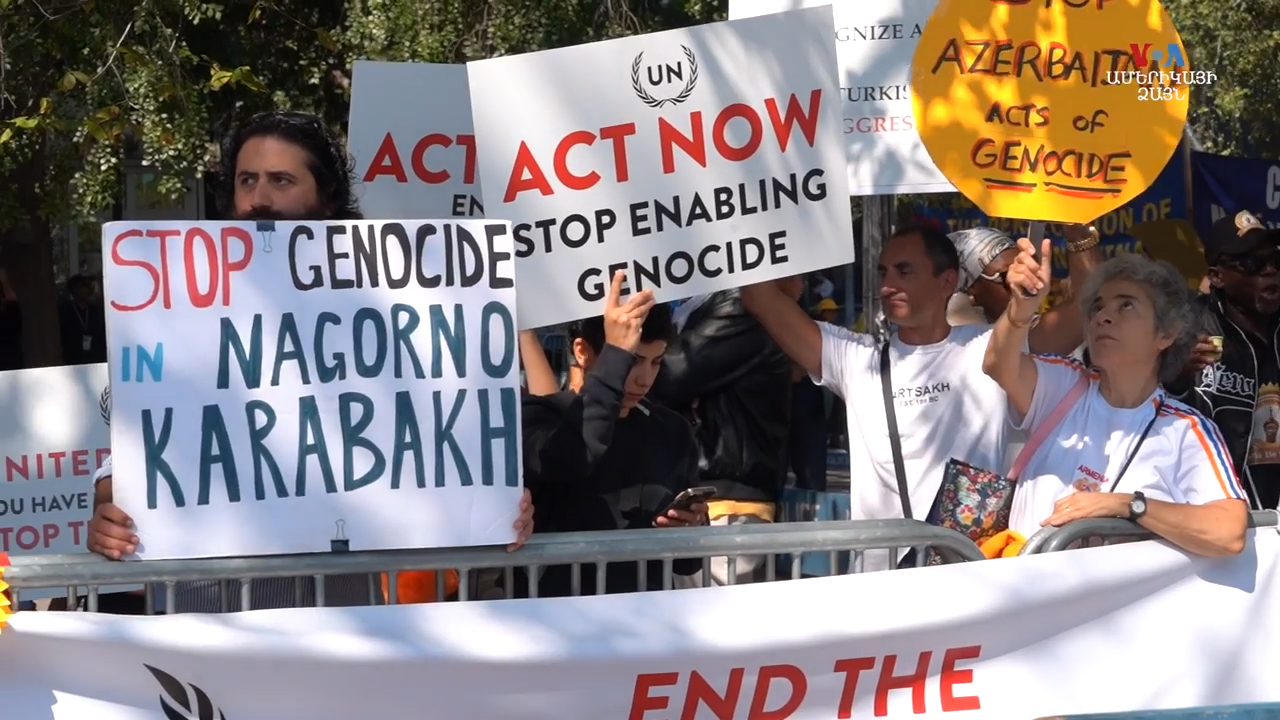
Armenians protesting in front of the UN headquarters

In Los Angeles, members of the Armenian community used a trailer truck to block a major freeway for several hours to draw attention to the situation in Nagorno-Karabakh on 19 September, causing major traffic jams. Actress Kim Kardashian, who is of Armenian descent, called on United States President Joe Biden "to stop another Armenian genocide" on social media. Armenian students of the University of Southern California protested the presence of Turkish ambassador to the United States Hasan Murat Mercan at a foreign policy conference held in the university campus. The university refused to cancel the event, maintaining their stance on freedom of speech.

In Lebanon, firecrackers were thrown at the Azerbaijani embassy in the Ein Aar suburb of Beirut during a protest by Lebanese Armenians on 28 September, prompting riot police to disperse them with tear gas. Armenian Argentines also held a protest in front of the Azerbaijani embassy in Buenos Aires.

==== Russia ====
Russian foreign ministry spokeswoman Maria Zakharova said that Russia was "deeply alarmed by the sharp escalation." Chairman of the Security Council of Russia Dmitry Medvedev said that Russia will not defend Armenia from the Azerbaijani offensive, while strongly criticizing Armenian Prime Minister Nikol Pashinyan for "[flirting] with NATO" and "defiantly going to [Russia's] enemies with cookies". This comes despite Russia and Armenia both being members of the Collective Security Treaty Organization mutual defense pact and Russia stationing several thousand soldiers in Armenia and Nagorno-Karabakh as peacekeepers.

Presidential spokesperson Dmitry Peskov denied accusations from Armenia that the country's peacekeepers had failed to protect Nagorno-Karabakh from the Azerbaijani attack, calling them "unfounded". Peskov later said that the future of the peacekeeping mission was to be decided between Russia and Armenia now that their area of operation was effectively in Azerbaijani territory. A week before the fighting, President Vladimir Putin said that the country could do nothing if Armenia had already recognized Nagorno-Karabakh as part of Azerbaijan, referring to statements made by Pashinyan in May that appeared to recognize Azerbaijani sovereignty over Nagorno-Karabakh in exchange for security guarantees towards the Armenian population.

The independent Russian media outlet Meduza said it had obtained a guidance document from the Kremlin circulated on 19 September to state media outlets that recommended blaming Armenia and the West, rather than Azerbaijan, for the escalation of the conflict in Nagorno-Karabakh. Speaking at the 78th United Nations General Assembly in New York City on 23 September, Foreign Minister Sergei Lavrov accused the Armenian leadership of adding "fuel to the fire", referring to the conflict, and reiterated that agreements made following the collapse of the Soviet Union in 1991 stated that the existing borders of its former constituent republics were inviolable, hereby recognizing Nagorno-Karabakh as part of Azerbaijan.

==== Turkey ====
Hakan Fidan, the Minister of Foreign Affairs, offered diplomatic support to Azerbaijan, stating that their military operation was "justified" and that "Azerbaijan has taken the measures it deems necessary on its own sovereign territory." Addressing the United Nations General Assembly, Turkish President Recep Tayyip Erdoğan stated "As everyone now acknowledges, Karabakh is Azerbaijani territory. Imposition of another status [to the region] will never be accepted," and that "[Turkey] support[s] the steps taken by Azerbaijan — with whom we act together with the motto of one nation, two states — to defend its territorial integrity." Erdoğan also met with Aliyev in the Nakhchivan Autonomous Republic.

==== European Union ====
The President of the European Council of the European Union Charles Michel condemned Azerbaijan's hostility and urged the country to immediately stop its military activities and return to dialogue, through a social media post.

On 21 September, Josep Borrell, the High Representative of the European Union for Foreign Affairs and Security Policy released a statement which condemned the military operation by Azerbaijan against the Armenian population of Nagorno-Karabakh and deplored the casualties and loss of life caused by the offensive. According to RFE/RL's journalist Rikard Jozwiak, this was not issued as a joint statement of the entire bloc because it was vetoed by Hungary. Hungarian Foreign Minister Péter Szijjártó denied this and said that the country, "along with several other member states, provided feedback and proposed amendments for a joint statement." However, he said that a consensus was not reached, which led Borrell to issue the statement on his own behalf.

David McAllister, chair of the European Parliament's foreign affairs committee, warned of "serious consequences" if Armenians were pressured to leave.

The President of the European Commission, Ursula von der Leyen condemned "the military operation by Azerbaijan against the Armenian population of Nagorno-Karabakh and reaffirmed the need to respect the sovereignty and territorial integrity of Armenia". She also announced preparations for a joint EU-US event to support Armenia.

==== United Nations ====
United Nations spokesman Stéphane Dujarric told Al Jazeera that the situation in Nagorno-Karabakh was "very concerning". He urged both sides to halt hostilities and go back to "sustained dialogue". The UN Secretary-General's Special Adviser on the Prevention of Genocide, Alice Wairimu Nderitu, expressed alarm at the military escalation by Azerbaijan, saying that: "Military action can only contribute to escalate what is already a tense situation and to put the civilian population in the area at risk of violence, including risk of genocide and related atrocity crimes."

The United Nations Human Rights Council adopted a joint statement on 12 October, signed by delegates from countries including Armenia, United Kingdom, Germany, Canada, United States, France and Japan (Note: Other countries that signed the joint statement include Australia, Austria, Belgium, Bulgaria, Greece, Denmark, Ireland, Iceland, Spain, Cyprus, Latvia, Liechtenstein, Lithuania, Luxembourg, Malta, Netherlands, New Zealand, Norway, Portugal, Slovakia, Slovenia, Uruguay, Finland, Croatia, Sweden and Switzerland.) expressing concern over the humanitarian and human rights crisis in Nagorno-Karabakh. Urging both Armenia and Azerbaijan to offer the OHCHR assistance and ensure the rights and safety of those remaining in the region. They also urged compliance with interim measures adopted by the European Court of Human Rights and provisional measures of the International Court. Lastly, the statement called for continued humanitarian assistance to those displaced by the crisis and for international access to Nagorno-Karabakh, supporting dialogue among all parties to ensure comprehensive and lasting peace.

==== Council of Europe ====
The Council of Europe stated that it was "extremely concerned about the serious humanitarian and human rights situation in Nagorno-Karabakh".

The Council of Europe Commissioner for Human Rights Dunja Mijatović visited Armenia and Azerbaijan, including the Karabakh region, from 16 to 23 October 2023, and published on 12 January 2024 her observations. Testimonies provided to the Commissioner by Karabakh Armenians reveal a deep-rooted fear for their lives and future amid armed conflicts, exacerbated by Azerbaijan's control resulting from unresolved past atrocities and ongoing intimidation. Feeling abandoned by all parties and with no security guarantees, the heightened vulnerability experienced during the blockade, and the unexpected reopening of the Lachin corridor in late September 2023, prompted Karabakh Armenians to believe that leaving the region immediately was the only option available to ensure their survival and future well-being. The Commissioner also stated that all displaced persons have the right to return to their homes, regardless of whether they have been displaced internally or across borders, and that both Armenia and Azerbaijan have the obligation to ensure that any return is voluntary, safe and dignified.

==== Other countries ====
Map of international reactions to the offensive: Azerbaijan Artsakh and Armenia Countries that have condemned Azerbaijan Countries that have maintained a neutral stance or called for peace Countries that have supported Azerbaijan Unknown

- Albanian Minister for Europe and Foreign Affairs Igli Hasani called on both sides to "prioritize the protection of civilians and preservation of residential areas and the civilian infrastructure". He urged Armenia and Azerbaijan to find a peaceful solution to the issue.
- Argentine President Alberto Fernández condemned Azerbaijan for the blockade of the Lachin corridor and urged the international community to "act preemptively" to avoid "new persecutions."
- The Brazilian Ministry of Foreign Affairs stated that the country was following the conflict with "great concern" and called for peaceful dialogue between both sides with the mediation of the European Union, the United States and Russia. Ambassador to the United Nations Sérgio França Danese condemned the military operation, stressing that it would "risk the fragile stability achieved after the 2020 ceasefire".
- President of Republika Srpska Milorad Dodik expressed his support for the full integration of Karabakh into Azerbaijan.
- Canadian Minister of Foreign Affairs Mélanie Joly expressed grave concern with Azerbaijan's military intervention, calling for immediate cessation of hostilities, asking the Azerbaijani government to refrain from any actions and activities that pose a risk to the safety and welfare of the civilian population of Nagorno-Karabakh, labelling the military action as "unjustifiable" and the Lachin corridor blockade as "illegal". Member of Parliament Garnett Genuis said that Azerbaijan "is launching an aggressive war of choice, calling it a 'military operation' and taking a page out of Russia's playbook in the process"
- China's Deputy Permanent Representative to the United Nations Geng Shuang said during a United Nations Security Council emergency meeting on Nagorno-Karabakh that China was "carefully monitoring the situation", he added that he hoped that the Russian-mediated ceasefire would be upheld by both sides and result in the end of the conflict. He also expressed regret over the five Russian peacekeepers that were killed during the conflict.
- Cyprus's Ministry of Foreign Affairs stated that the country "categorically condemns the ongoing large-scale military aggression by Azerbaijan against the Armenian-populated Nagorno Karabakh" and called on Azerbaijan to de-escalate immediately.
- President of the Senate of the Czech Republic Miloš Vystrčil expressed support for Armenia's territorial integrity and sovereignty, welcoming the latest European Parliament resolution condemning the offensive in Nagorno-Karabakh during a meeting with Vice Speaker of Parliament of Armenia Hakob Arshakyan.
- The French Ministry of Foreign Affairs strongly condemned the military operation and called for Azerbaijan "to immediately cease its assault and return to respect for international law" and requested an emergency meeting of the United Nations Security Council. It stated that France had been "working closely with its European and American partners" to effectively respond to the attack, which it described as "unacceptable". Foreign Minister Catherine Colonna said it would hold Azerbaijan "responsible for the fate of Armenians of Nagorno-Karabakh." President Emmanuel Macron accused Russia of complicity with Azerbaijan in its offensive and also accused Turkey of threatening Armenia's borders.
- Gabon's Representative to the United Nations Edwige Koumby Missambo stressed that "everything must be done to avoid a return" to the 2020 war. She called on both sides to adhere to the ceasefire agreement and facilitate access of humanitarian personnel to population in need without restriction.
- Georgia offered to act as a mediator between Azerbaijan and Armenia in peace talks and normalisation of relations. This was accepted by Azerbaijan but Armenia did not comment.
- German Foreign Minister Annalena Baerbock accused Azerbaijan of breaking its promise not to resort to military action in Nagorno-Karabakh and called on it to stop and return to negotiations.
- Ghana's Representative to the United Nations Carolyn Abena Anima Oppong-Ntiri said the conflict was a reminder of the "fragile peace in the region", extending condolences to the families of civilians and Russian peacekeepers killed. She said an escalation of tensions in Nagorno-Karabakh was one that Europe and the rest of the world "can ill afford at this time of immense global security and political upheavals" and appealed for unrestricted humanitarian access as well as free movement along the Lachin Corridor.
- Greece's Foreign Ministry condemned Azerbaijan's offensive in Nagorno-Karabakh and urged the country to respect the human rights of ethnic Armenians and guarantee their safety.
- The Holy See urged both sides to cease hostilities and seek a peaceful solution to the crisis.
- Hungarian prime minister Viktor Orbán met with Azerbaijani President Ilham Aliyev and congratulated Aliyev on the successful offensive.
- India said that it encouraged both parties to ensure long-term peace and security in the region through dialogue and diplomacy, which includes the safety and well-being of all civilians.
- Iran offered to mediate the conflict between Azerbaijan and Armenia a day before the military operation began. Foreign Ministry spokesman Nasser Kanaani urged both sides to adhere to the 2020 ceasefire agreement.
- The Irish Foreign Ministry condemned Azerbaijan's military operation and called for the ceasefire in Nagorno-Karabakh to be respected and for immediate genuine and comprehensive dialogue.
- Japanese Foreign Minister Yōko Kamikawa expressed serious concern over the worsening of the situation in Nagorno-Karabakh, calling for the immediate discontinuation of hostilities and asking Azerbaijan to cease the current military activities.
- Kazakhstan's ambassador to Azerbaijan Alim Bayel said that the country welcomed Azerbaijan's initiative to hold talks with "representatives of the Armenian population of Karabakh." He also said that the country hoped "for a speedy resolution of the current situation through peaceful dialogue within the internationally recognized borders of the Republic of Azerbaijan."
- Luxembourg's Minister for Foreign Affairs Jean Asselborn condemned Azerbaijan's military operation in Nagorno-Karabakh. He also stressed that military operations in populated areas must immediately stop to protect the lives of civilians, and Azerbaijan must abide by its international commitments.
- Maltese Minister for Foreign and European Affairs and Trade Ian Borg expressed support to the sovereignty and territorial integrity of both Armenia and Azerbaijan as he called for all hostilities to stop and both sides to commit to dialogue and negotiation.
- Mozambique's Representative to the United Nations Domingos Estêvão Fernandes voiced concern about the conflict and offered condolences for the lives lost. He urged both sides to adhere to the 2020 and the current ceasefire agreements.
- Norway's Ministry of Foreign Affairs expressed concern that the population of Nagorno-Karabakh may be forced to leave the region due to Azerbaijan's offensive, which it said would lead to a humanitarian disaster. It stressed that such events must be prevented at all costs and that Azerbaijan was responsible for ensuring the safety and well-being of the Armenian people in the region.
- Pakistani Foreign Ministry spokeswoman Mumtaz Zahra Baloch reaffirmed "unwavering" support for Azerbaijan's sovereignty and territorial integrity, she added that Karabakh is a sovereign territory of Azerbaijan aligning with international resolutions and laws. He also expressed condolences for lives lost in mine explosions and hope for lasting peace in Karabakh. Foreign Minister Jalil Abbas Jilani met with his Azerbaijani counterpart Jeyhun Bayramov, and reiterated the country's support for the territorial integrity of Azerbaijan.
- Poland's Ministry of Foreign Affairs expressed serious concern about the escalation of the conflict in Karabakh and called on Azerbaijan to cease hostilities and for both sides to resume dialogue involving the European Union and the United States.
- Qatar's Minister of Foreign Affairs described the offensive as "deeply concerning" and urged all parties to stop the military escalation.
- Serbian President Aleksandar Vučić said that Serbia supports the "territorial integrity of member countries of the United Nations" but called for avoiding armed conflicts and further escalation.
- Switzerland's Permanent Representative to the United Nations Pascale Baeriswyl said that the military operation placed "additional burden on the already suffering civilian population of the Nagorno-Karabakh region". Following the ceasefire, she called for a lasting halt to hostilities on the ground. She urged both sides to adhere to the 2020 ceasefire agreement and rulings of the International Court of Justice.
- United Arab Emirates Minister of State Ahmed Bin Ali Al Sayegh welcomed the Russian-mediated ceasefire and stressed that all parties involved "must commit to protecting civilians and ensuring their security and safety". He also expressed appreciation for the role played by Russian peacekeepers in providing safe haven for civilians during the conflict and expressed regret on civilians and peacekeepers killed.
- In a statement to the Organization for Security and Co-operation in Europe (OSCE), the United Kingdom said that the military offensive by Azerbaijan was "unacceptable" and urged Azerbaijan to return to dialogue, welcoming the announcement of a ceasefire.
- United States Secretary of State Antony Blinken met with Turkish diplomats about the crisis. Meanwhile, the Senate Committee on Foreign Relations called on the U.S. and the international community to act to stop Azerbaijan while Representative Brad Sherman stated that the renewed fighting made it clear that "Azerbaijan cannot receive U.S. military aid until it ends the crisis it has created." The US military said its ongoing joint military exercise with Armenia, codenamed Eagle Partner 2023, was unaffected by the conflict, and the ten-day exercise concluded as scheduled on 20 September. On 26 September, the United States Agency for International Development chief Samantha Power called on Azerbaijan "to maintain the ceasefire and take concrete steps to protect the rights of civilians in Nagorno-Karabakh". United States ambassador to the United Nations Linda Thomas-Greenfield urged Azerbaijan to comply with international law and humanitarian law, and ensure humanitarian organizations can provide necessary assistance without roadblocks.
- First vice-speaker of the Senate of Uzbekistan Sodiq Safoyev expressed support for Azerbaijan and its military operation and praised Azerbaijan for "restoring territorial integrity and justice in Nagorno-Karabakh".

==== Other international organizations ====
- The human rights organization Genocide Watch issued a new genocide alert on Azerbaijan, saying that the objective of President Aliyev's regime was "to drive all Armenians out of Artsakh through war and genocide," adding that "the silent genocide has become overt" and elevated their assessment of the situation to Stage 9: Extermination.
- Organization of Turkic States Secretary General Kubanychbek Omuraliev expressed "serious concern regarding the Armenian provocations against Azerbaijan's sovereignty and territorial integrity" and condemned "the recent terror acts committed against Azerbaijan". He also expressed the "anti-terror measures conducted by Azerbaijan, will ensure reintegration of the Armenian residents into the constitutional system of the Republic of Azerbaijan".

=== Foreign involvement ===
==== Belarus ====
According to leaked documents, Belarus provided advanced weaponry to Azerbaijan, including artillery and drones, that were used in this conflict, prompting Armenian withdrawal from the Collective Security Treaty Organization in June 2024.

==== Israel ====
Israel is one of the major arms exporters to Azerbaijan, accounting for 27% of Azerbaijan's major arms imports from 2011 to 2020, and 69% of Azerbaijan's major imports from 2016 to 2020, according to research from the Stockholm International Peace Research Institute. According to Efraim Inbar, an expert on Israel-Azerbaijan relations and president of the Jerusalem Institute for Strategy and Security, ties between the two countries have grown stronger since the 2020 war.

The offensive involving heavy artillery, rocket launchers and drones were suspected to be largely supplied by Israel alongside Turkey. Weeks before the offensive, Azerbaijani military cargo planes repeatedly flew between a southern Israeli airbase and an airfield near Nagorno-Karabakh, according to flight tracking data and Armenian diplomats. Armenia's ambassador to Israel Arman Akopian said that he voiced his concerns about Israeli weaponry shipments to the Israeli government.

==== Turkey ====
An official of the Turkish Ministry of National Defense stated that while Turkey was using "all means" to support Azerbaijan, including the modernisation of the Azerbaijani military and military training, denied that the country played a direct role in the offensive, instead limiting its support for Azerbaijan to diplomatic means.

==== Armenia ====
Armenian Prime Minister Nikol Pashinyan stated that the Armenian Armed Forces were not involved in the fighting and that its forces were not stationed in Nagorno-Karabakh. Armenia's Ministry of Defense accused Azerbaijani officials of spreading misinformation, saying that there is no Armenian military equipment or personnel present in Nagorno-Karabakh.

== Analysis ==
Various political analysts and Artsakh residents consider Azerbaijan's underlying goal for the offensive to be ethnic cleansing.

Luis Moreno Ocampo, the first Prosecutor of the International Criminal Court, warned that another Armenian genocide was about to take place. Citing the 1948 Genocide Convention, he stated that Azerbaijan was purposely inflicting living conditions to physically destroy a specific group by blocking the Lachin corridor, and was proceeding to kill and cause "serious bodily and mental harm". Moreno Ocampo stated the inaction of the international community would encourage Azerbaijan in the belief that it would face no serious consequences for committing genocide. He also discredited Aliyev's claims that his regime was not seeking ethnic cleansing, pointing out that Aliyev regularly referred to Armenia as "Western Azerbaijan" and claimed "present-day Armenia is our land".

Thomas de Waal said that Azerbaijan was emboldened to start its offensive during a downturn in relations between Russia and Armenia, and the loss of the Russian peacekeeping force's "best commanders" to the invasion of Ukraine. He also said that Russia could use such a crisis to instigate regime change in Armenia.

A group of 123 Turkish academics released a statement warning the international community about Azerbaijan's intentions to commit genocide in Nagorno-Karabakh. In response, the Federation of Eurasian Turkic Associations called for the academics to have their citizenship revoked and for them to be expelled to Armenia.

Belarusian Nobel Prize laureate Ales Bialiatski coined the term "Azerbaijanization" to describe NATO member countries' tendency to ignore violations of human rights when it suits their interests.

Sergey Radchenko, a historian on Cold War politics and professor at Cardiff University, questioned the lack of international intervention in Nagorno-Karabakh, comparing the situation to that of NATO's intervention in Kosovo in 1999.

Nikolay Mitrokhin, a researcher at the University of Bremen, attributed the speed of Azerbaijan's victory to its demographic superiority over both Nagorno-Karabakh and Armenia and the failure of the latter to strengthen their defenses and strategies against the modernized Azerbaijani military. He also attributed the collapse of the Nagorno-Karabakh military to the weakness and corruption of both the Nagorno-Karabakh and Armenian economies which turned away potential investors in their militaries and noted that these factors had already contributed to the previous Azerbaijani victory in 2020.

== See also ==
- 2016 Nagorno-Karabakh conflict
- 2023 Artsakhian presidential election
- Armenia–Azerbaijan relations
- List of conflicts between Armenia and Azerbaijan
