= Chankatagh =

Village in Aghdara District, Azerbaijan

Chankatagh / Janyatag Ճանկաթաղ / Canyataq
- Location within Azerbaijan Location within Karabakh Economic Region
- Coordinates: 40°08′19″N 46°46′09″E
- Country: Azerbaijan
  - District: Aghdara

Population (2015)
  - Total: 385
- Time zone: UTC+4 (AZT)

Chankatagh (Armenian: Ճանկաթաղ) or Janyatag (Azerbaijani: Canyataq) is a village located in the Aghdara District of Azerbaijan, in the region of Nagorno-Karabakh. Until 2023 it was controlled by the breakaway Republic of Artsakh. The village had an ethnic Armenian-majority population until the expulsion of the Armenian population of Nagorno-Karabakh by Azerbaijan following the 2023 Azerbaijani offensive in Nagorno-Karabakh.

== History ==
During the Soviet period, the village was a part of the Mardakert District of the Nagorno-Karabakh Autonomous Oblast.

On September 20, 2023, 5 Russian peacekeepers were killed by the Azerbaijani military in the vicinity of the village.

== Historical heritage sites ==
Historical heritage sites in and around the village include tombs from the 1st century BCE, a medieval village and cemetery, a 13th-century khachkar, St. George's Church (Armenian: Սուրբ Գևորգ եկեղեցի, romanized: Surb Gevorg Yekeghetsi) built in 1609, and a 17th-century chapel.

== Economy and culture ==
The population is mainly engaged in agriculture, animal husbandry, and mining. As of 2015, the village has a municipal building, a house of culture, a secondary school, three shops, and a medical centre.

== Demographics ==
The village had 272 inhabitants in 2005, and 385 inhabitants in 2015.
