= Joint Russian-Turkish Monitoring Centre =

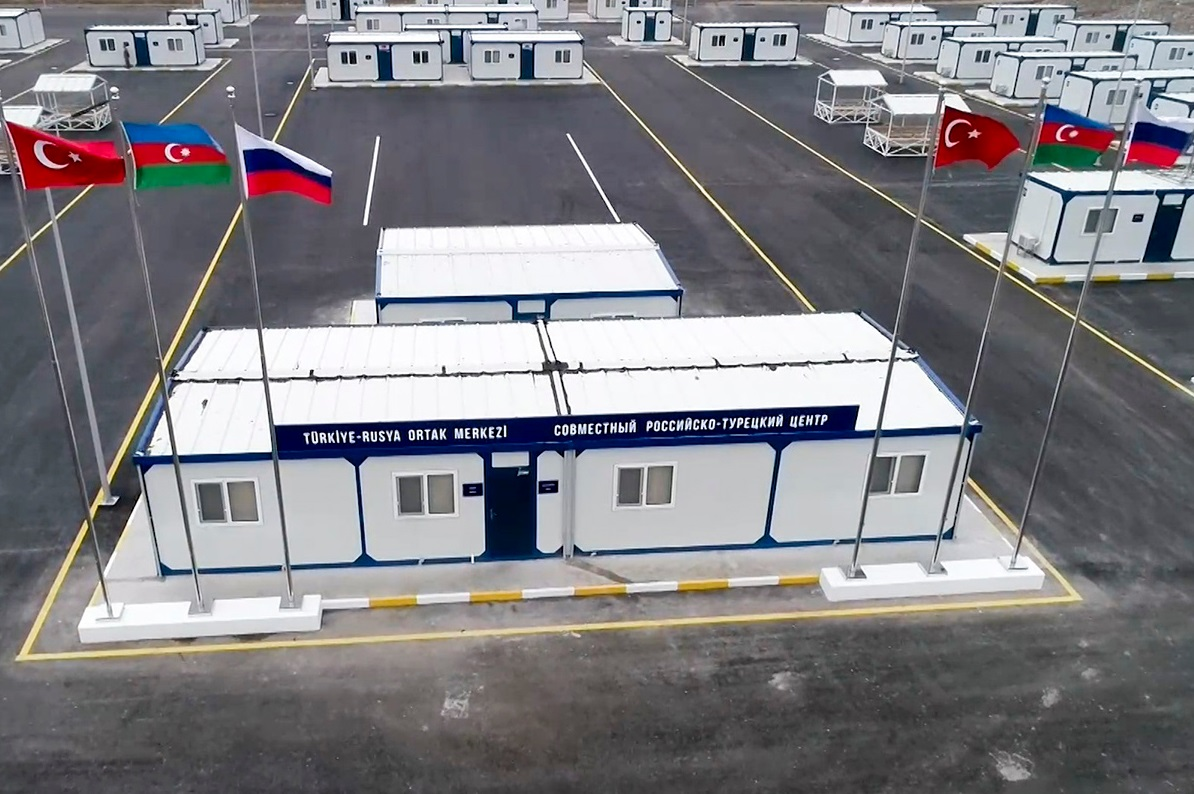

The joint Russian-Turkish center for monitoring the ceasefire regime and all military operations in the Nagorno-Karabakh conflict zone (RTJMC, Azerbaijani: Rusiya-Türkiyə Birgə Monitorinq Mərkəzi, Turkish: Rusya-Türkiye Ortak Merkezi) is a ceasefire monitoring center in the Aghdam district. The main purpose of the center is to monitor the implementation of the terms of the trilateral statement signed on November 10, 2020, by the Presidents of Russia, Azerbaijan and the Prime Minister of Armenia, and the agreements that were reached between them.

The total area of the center is approximately 4 hectares. There are 65 office premises, working rooms and living rooms on the territory.

== History ==
On November 11, 2020, the Ministers of Defence of Russia and Turkey signed a memorandum of understanding on the establishment of a joint monitoring center in Azerbaijan.

On November 16, the Turkish Government submitted a proposal to the Grand National Assembly of Turkey on the deployment of peacekeepers in Azerbaijan. On December 2, the Minister of Defence Hulusi Akar said that the Russian and Turkish governments reached the agreement and that the joint center was under construction.

On January 30, 2021, the joint center was opened on the territory of the Aghdam district near the village of Qiyamaddinli.

== See also ==
- 2020 Nagorno-Karabakh war
- 2020 Nagorno-Karabakh ceasefire agreement
