= Harav =

Harav Հարավ Harov
- Location within Azerbaijan
- Coordinates: 39°49′22″N 46°50′53″E
- Country: Azerbaijan
  - District: Khojaly
- Elevation: 1,129 m (3,704 ft)

Population (2015)
  - Total: 324
- Time zone: UTC+4 (AZT)

Harav (Armenian: Հարավ) or Harov (also Garov) is a village located in the Khojaly District of Azerbaijan, in the region of Nagorno-Karabakh. Until 2023 it was controlled by the breakaway Republic of Artsakh. The village had an ethnic Armenian-majority population until the expulsion of the Armenian population of Nagorno-Karabakh by Azerbaijan following the 2023 Azerbaijani offensive in Nagorno-Karabakh.

== History ==
During the Soviet period, the village was a part of the Askeran District of the Nagorno-Karabakh Autonomous Oblast.

== Historical heritage sites ==
Historical heritage sites in and around the village include a 13th-century khachkar, the 16th/17th-century monastery-fortress of Bovurkhan (Armenian: Բովուրխան), a 17th/18th-century cemetery, and the St. Mesrop Church (Armenian: Սուրբ Մեսրոպ եկեղեցի, romanized: Surb Mesrop Yekeghetsi) built in 1795.

== Economy and culture ==
The population is mainly engaged in agriculture and animal husbandry. As of 2015, the village has a municipal building, a house of culture, a secondary school, a kindergarten, and a medical centre.

== Demographics ==
The village had 300 inhabitants in 2005, and 324 inhabitants in 2015.
