= Ulubabyan =

Ulubabyan (Armenian: Ուլուբաբյան, derived from Turkish ulubaba [ulu "great" + baba "father"], meaning "great father/elder") is an Armenian surname. Notable people with the surname include:

- Bagrat Ulubabyan (1925–2001), Armenian writer and historian
- Vardges Ulubabyan (born 1968), politician from Nagorno-Karabakh
