= Harutyunyan government =

Governing body of the Republic of Artsakh

Government of Arayik Harutyunyan
- government of Artsakh
- Date formed: 21 May 2020
- Date dissolved: 1 September 2023

People and organisations
- Head of state: Arayik Harutyunyan
- Head of government: Arayik Harutyunyan
- No. of ministers: 12
- Member parties: Free Motherland - UCA Alliance (Free Motherland, UCA Party)
- Status in legislature: Minority with support from United Motherland
- Opposition parties: Justice; Armenian Revolutionary Federation; Democratic Party

History
- Election: 2020 Artsakhian general election
- Predecessor: Sahakyan government
- Successor: Shahramanyan government

The Second Harutyunyan government was the governing body of Artsakh between 21 May 2020 to 1 September 2023. Arayik Harutyunyan is the President, who was elected in 2020 general election was the head of state and head of government.

It was a minority government of Free Motherland - UCA Alliance with the support of the United Motherland party.

== Structure ==
The structure of the government of Artsakh consisted of twelve ministries and three other bodies. Each ministry was responsible for elaborating and implementing governmental decisions in its respective sphere.

Office	Name	Party	
President	Arayik Harutyunyan		Free Motherland
State Minister	Grigory Martirosyan		Independent
Minister of Defence	Jalal Harutyunyan		Independent
Minister of Foreign Affairs	Masis Mayilyan		Independent
Minister of Economy and Industrial Infrastructures	Levon Grigoryan		Independent
Minister of Finance	Vahram Baghdasaryan		Free Motherland
Minister of Justice	Ararat Danielyan		Independent
Minister of Education Science and Culture	Lusine Gharakhanyan		Independent
Minister of Healthcare	Arayik Baghryan		Independent
Minister of Agriculture	Ashot Bakhshyan		Independent
Minister of Military Patriotic Upbringing, Youth, Sports and Tourism	Samvel Shahramanyan		Independent
Minister of Labour, Social Affairs and Housing	Samvel Avanesyan		Independent
Minister of Territorial Administration and Development	Zhirayr Mirzoyan		Independent
Minister of Urban Planning	Aram Sargsyan		Free Motherland
Minister of Internal Affairs	Karen Grigory Sargsyan	Non-party	
