= Ruben Vardanyan (politician) =

Armenian-born Russian businessman, oligarch and politician (born 1968)

- Ռուբեն Վարդանյան
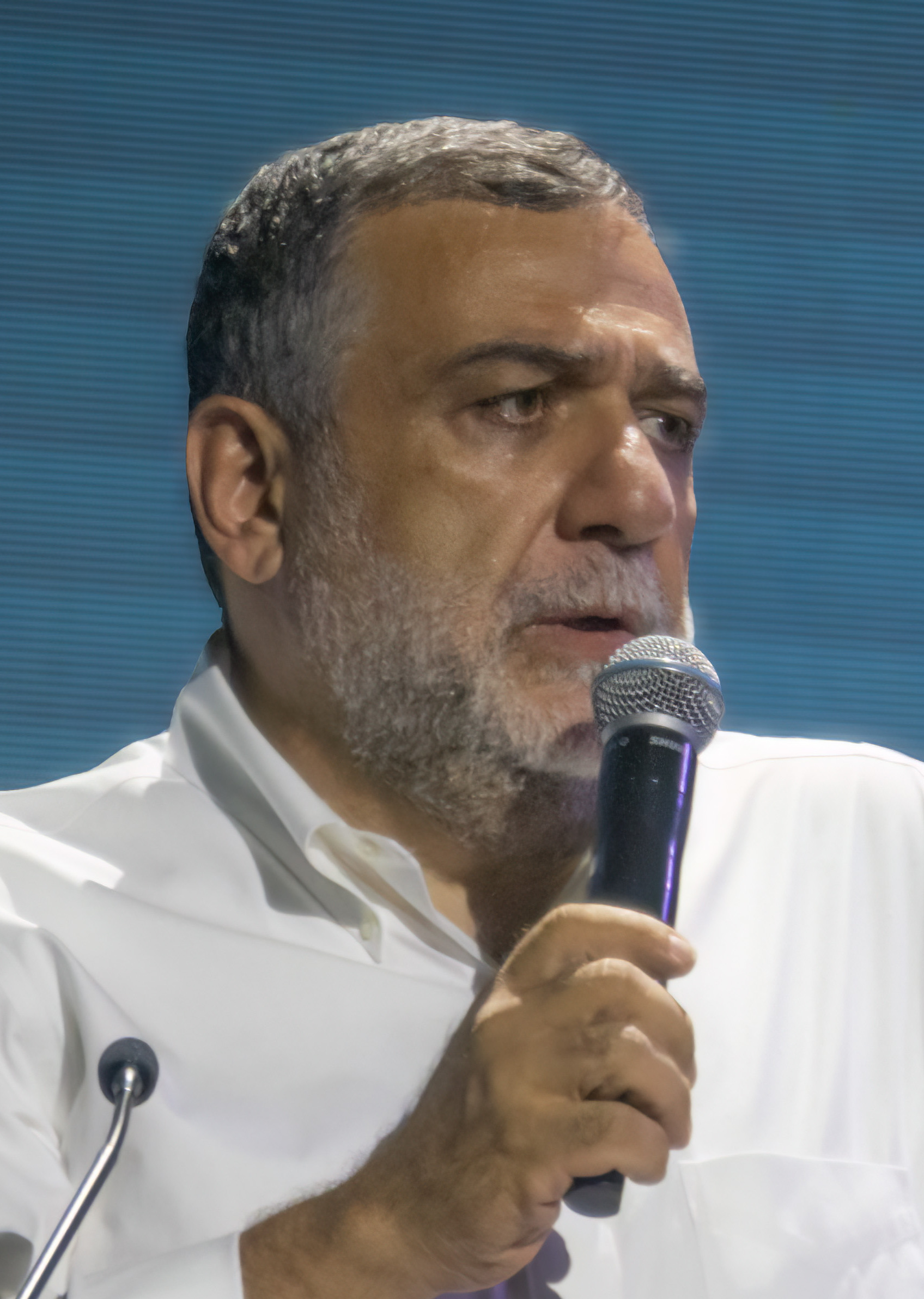
- Vardanyan in 2022

4th State Minister of Artsakh
- In office 4 November 2022 – 23 February 2023
- President: Arayik Harutyunyan
- Preceded by: Artak Beglaryan
- Succeeded by: Gurgen Nersisyan

Personal details
- Born: 25 May 1968 (age 58) Yerevan, Armenian SSR, Soviet Union
- Spouse: Veronika Zonabend
- Children: 4
- Education: Moscow State University

Ruben Karleni Vardanyan (Armenian: Ռուբեն Կառլենի Վարդանյան, Russian: Рубен Карленович Варданян; born 25 May 1968) is a Russian and Armenian oligarch and a politician who served as the State Minister of the Republic of Artsakh (Nagorno-Karabakh), an unrecognized state in the South Caucasus, from 4 November 2022 until 23 February 2023. Vardanyan was close to Vladimir Putin and likely had influential access to him. Vardanyan continued his support and work in Artsakh following his dismissal from the post of State Minister in 2023. Vardanyan has engaged in efforts to promote economic and social advancement in Armenia and Republic of Artsakh, focusing on long-term development projects.

Prior to his political career, Vardanyan was a businessman and philanthropist. He is the former chief executive officer and shareholder of the Troika Dialog investment bank, which was the hearth of the Troika laundromat. In 2021, his net worth was estimated by Forbes at $1 billion.

On 27 September 2023, following the Azerbaijani offensive in Nagorno-Karabakh and subsequent flight of Nagorno-Karabakh Armenians, Vardanyan was detained by Azerbaijani authorities in the Lachin corridor. A number of internationally renowned public figures and organizations have called for the release of Vardanyan along with other former de facto Nagorno-Karabakh officials, considering his detention to be politically motivated or in violation of international laws. On 17 February 2026, Vardanyan was sentenced to 20 years' imprisonment.

== Early life and education ==
Ruben Vardanyan was born on 25 May 1968, in Yerevan, Armenian SSR. In 1985 he graduated with honours from Yerevan School No. 35. In 1985, he enrolled in Moscow State University's Faculty of Economics. After completing his first year, he did military service in Soviet Azerbaijan and Armenia. In 1992 he graduated with honours from the Faculty of Economics.

Vardanyan was trained at Cassa di Risparmio di Torino Italian savings bank in Turin and completed a course on developing markets at Merrill Lynch in New York in 1992. Later, he completed short-term courses at INSEAD (Fontainebleau, France, 2000), Harvard Business School (2001, 2005, 2018), Yale University and Stanford GSB (2012, 2013).

== Career ==
=== Business activities (1999-2012) ===
Vardanyan and Peter Derby founded Troika Dialog on 18 March 1991. Vardanyan first worked as an expert and then headed the IPO department. In 1992, Vardanyan entered the executive board and became an executive director. As director of Troika Dialog, Vardanyan established relationships with Western investors and helped develop the legal framework and infrastructure for the Russian securities market.

Vardanyan became CEO of Troika Dialog in 1996. In the same year, Troika Dialog Asset Management (“TDAM”) was registered as the asset management arm of Troika Dialog which, in partnership with US-based Lexington Management Corporation, established the first mutual fund (the Lexington Troika Dialog Russia Fund) allowing US investors to participate in the Russian equity market.

Later he became the president, CEO, and chairman of the board of directors of the company. He held the post until the company was sold. In the early 2000s, Troika had offices in New York and London. In 2004, Vardanyan was named as both Ernst & Young's Entrepreneur of the Year in Russia and Investment Banker of the Year by the National Association of Securities Market Participants (“NAUFOR”).

As of 2011, the partners held 63.6% of Troika Dialog shares, with 40% owned by Vardanyan. At the end of financial year 2010, Troika’s assets totaled $5.75 billion, $872 million in equity and $42.346 million in revenue. On March 11, 2011, Sberbank announced its 100% acquisition of Troika Dialog for $1 billion; the transaction was finalized on January 23, 2012. The agreement also included Troika's partners’ bonuses for three years, thus the overall deal totaled $1.4 billion. Before the sale, Vardanyan owned the major block of shares (40%), estimated at $560 million. In requital, he was offered a 20.5% stake in AvtoVAZ and a 27.3% stake in Kamaz, later sold with a profit.

The merger resulted in the launch of Sberbank CIB (renamed from Troika Dialog), Sberbank’s corporate and investment banking business. Vardanyan had initially intended to sell his stake to Troika Dialog management before the Sberbank deal. From the sale of "Troika Dialog" until 2015, Vardanyan co-headed Sberbank CIB, also holding posts of adviser to the CEO of Sberbank and chairman of the board.

Vardanyan stepped down from his role at Sberbank CIB in 2015.

By 2013, Forbes estimated Vardanyan's net worth at $800 million.

=== Business activities (post-2012) ===
After the sale, Vardanyan devoted a significant portion of the funds to philanthropic causes and long-term infrastructure projects like the Skolkovo Business School, which he had founded in 2006.

In 2013 Vardanyan, along with Mikhail Broitman, started Vardanyan, Broitman and Co, an investment company. As of 2018, Vardanyan owned 75% of the company. Its assets include shares in Ameriabank, UFS Transport operator, and several venture projects (Lamoda, Pronutria, NtechLab). Major investments are placed in real estate management. In 2013 Vardanyan acquired a 50% share in Avica Management Company, an investment fund, established by Gagik Adibekyan's RD Group. In February 2018 the partners announced a split, dividing real estate assets worth an estimated $1 billion. According to the settlement, Vardanyan was to keep office spaces, including Romanov Dvor and Vozdvizhenka business centers. Also in 2018, Vardanyan and Global Blue announced the launch of Global Blue Russia, a first tax-refunding company in Russia.

In 2015 Ruben Vardanyan launched "Phoenix Advisors", a company engaged in family welfare protection, management and succession planning.

Vardanyan also co-founded the Future Armenian initiative, which contributes to a number of philanthropic ventures, with a focus on the promotion of entrepreneurship and in particular on the development of his home country, Armenia. He and the other founders have contributed to around 700 projects in Armenia with a total investment of over $700 million.

In 2020, the Anti-Corruption Foundation, a Russian NGO led by Russian opposition figure Alexei Navalny, published an investigation which concerned Santerna Holdings Limited, a company owned by Vardanyan. Citing Santerna's publicly available annual reports, the investigation found that, in 2016, Santerna invested almost $33.45 million in Luchano, a spa business owned by Gulsina Minnikhanova, the wife of the President of Tatarstan Rustam Minnikhanov. The annual reports showed that Santerna's auditors applied a $26.8 million impairment charge shortly after the investment, reducing Santerna's stake in Luchano to $6.6 million. In 2018, Santerna made another investment of $10 million in Luchano. Months later, the same auditors applied another impairment charge, further bringing down the value of Santerna's investment, to $5 million. Based on this financial activity, whereby Santerna willingly overpaid twice, the Anti-Corruption Foundation asserted that Vardanyan's company made two disguised gifts, or bribes, to the wife of the President of Tatarstan. In the aftermath of both investments, investigative journalists found millions of dollars of luxury real estate owned by Minnikhanov's family. Vardanyan denied these accusations.

=== Corporate governance roles ===
In 2004, Vardanyan was CEO of Rosgosstrakh. He also headed Troika Dialog at the same time. As of October 2019, Vardanyan is one of the members of board of directors at Kamaz, Ameriabank and Global Blue Russia Holdings B.V. He also is a member of the investment committee Avica Property Investors International, a member of the supervisory board at Investment and Venture Fund of the Republic of Tatarstan. Vardanyan is the chairman of the editorial committee international at BRICS Business Magazine. He previously had served as an expert and executive member of advisory boards at Sollers JSC, AvtoVAZ, Sibur, Novatek, Sukhoi Civil Aircraft Company, Sheremetyevo International Airport, Rosgosstrakh, International Finance Corporation, Standard Bank, Marsh & McLennan Companies, Russian Trading System, Moscow Stock Exchange, the Federal Commission on Securities Market, the Depository Clearing Company, the National Association of Stock Market participants etc. He also headed the National Association of Stock Market participants during 1997 and 1998. Since 2000, Vardanyan has been a member of the Russian Union of Industrialists and Entrepreneurs (RSPP) where he was one of the members of executive board till 2012. In 2009 he entered the Committee on Innovative Policy and Entrepreneurship. Vardanyan was one of the co-founders of the 2015 Club, an informal Russian businessmen organization, that worked on strategic planning for the Russian economy up to 2015. Since 2010 Vardanyan is a member of trustees at the Alexander Gorchakov Public Diplomacy Fund. In 2015 he co-founded the Primakov Center for International Cooperation, currently Vardanyan is a member of its advisory board. In 2019, Vardanyan was invited to join the executive board of Moscow-based ACRA rating agency.

== Move to Armenia and Nagorno-Karabakh ==
In June 2021, Vardanyan acquired Armenian citizenship. He stated that he made his decision to move back to Armenia following the Second Nagorno-Karabakh War. In the past, Vardanyan had denied any intention to take up any government position in Armenia; however, he was viewed as a potential political player and is rumored to be involved with the newly founded political party Country of Living. In November 2021, Vardanyan gave an interview in which he spoke about his plans to start a political career in Armenia and also considered the possibility of becoming the president of Armenia.

In September 2022, Vardanyan declared that he was moving to the unrecognized Republic of Artsakh (in the region of Nagorno-Karabakh) and announced that he was no longer a Russian citizen. Following Russia's 2022 invasion of Ukraine, Vardanyan was named in a draft bill in the U.S. House of Representatives which called for him to be targeted for individual sanctions. Vardanyan denied that his renunciation of Russian citizenship was an attempt to escape international sanctions against Russia. In his words, his actions stemmed from a desire to be with his nation during a time of crisis: “Today the people of Artsakh are in a very difficult psychological state, they have no confidence in the future. The inhabitants of the republic, who survived two wars and lost their loved ones in the struggle for independence, feel abandoned,” he stated.

Initially he was reluctant to take any political post, but a couple of month later, in October, Vardanyan was suddenly offered the position of State Minister, which was equivalent of prime minister, with "broad powers" by President of Artsakh Arayik Harutyunyan. Harutyunyan appointed Vardanyan Minister of State on 4 November 2022. Vardanyan submitted a request to Russian state authorities to annul his citizenship so that he could become a citizen of Artsakh, which was officially granted in December 2022. Vardanyan was dismissed from the position of State Minister on 23 February 2023, having held office for less than four months. Vardanyan’s dismissal was one of the key demands made by Azerbaijan for it to end its blockade of Nagorno-Karabakh. Prior to this, Vardanyan had rejected Azerbaijani demands that he leave the region. Following his dismissal, Vardanyan vowed to continue living and working in Artsakh.

=== Azerbaijan's 2023 offensive in Nagorno-Karabakh and detainment ===
In September 2023, following the Azerbaijani offensive in Nagorno-Karabakh and subsequent flight of Nagorno-Karabakh Armenians, Vardanyan was detained by Azerbaijani authorities in the Lachin corridor on charges of "financing terrorism, creating illegal armed formations and illegally crossing a state border". A number of internationally renowned public figures and organizations have called for the release of Vardanyan along with other former de facto Nagorno-Karabakh officials, describing the charges as fabricated and considering his detention to be politically motivated or in violation of international laws.

Following his arrest, Vardanyan’s wife was quoted as saying that “Ruben stood with the people of Artsakh, during the 10-month blockade and suffered with them in the struggle for survival. I ask for your prayers.” US senator Ed Markey has stated that Vardanyan and several others have been illegally detained in violation of international laws.

The court extended Vardanyan’s pre-trial detention by another four months in January 2024. He then went on a hunger strike in April to demand a speedy trial, but his family reported on 25 April 2024 that he ended it. In June 2024, a team of international attorneys representing Vardanyan filed a complaint with the UN that Vardanyan had been tortured in the Azeri prison.

The United Nations Human Rights Council’s Working Group on Arbitrary Detention (UNWGAD), at its 101st session held in November 2024, adopted an opinion that the detention of Ruben Vardanyan was not arbitrary and did not violate international law on the grounds of discrimination. The impartiality of the UNWGAD was challenged by former ICC prosecutor Luis Moreno Ocampo, who asserted that Ganna Yudkivska, the Chair-Rapporteur of the Working Group, had "professional, financial, and family ties with Azerbaijan," including links to a law firm representing the Azerbaijani state oil company, which he described as "gross contraventions of UN rules" that compromised the body’s neutrality. Similar concerns were raised by former UN official Hasmik Egian.

On 17 January 2025 Vardanyan and 15 other Karabakh Armenian officials went on trial for terrorism, crimes against humanity and crimes against the state of Azerbaijan. Vardanyan stated that he faced 42 charges in all, and also that he had not been given a chance to properly review the indictment. He began another hunger strike in February 2025. In testimony before the Tom Lantos Human Rights Commission, Jared Genser, legal counsel to Ruben Vardanyan, further characterized the case against Vardanyan as a "mockery of justice," citing “egregious due process abuses," including trial before a military tribunal, lack of access to fully translated documents, closed hearings, denial of access to international counsel, and torture.

On 17 February 2026, Vardanyan was convicted on 19 charges including "crimes against peace and humanity", "war crimes" and "terrorism" and sentenced to 20 years' imprisonment.

== Philanthropy and social entrepreneurship ==
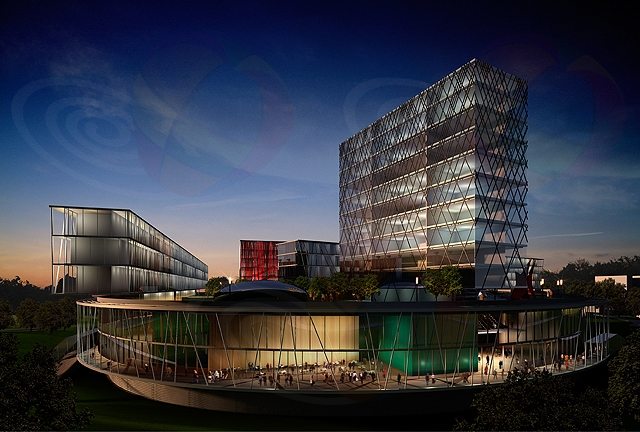
Moscow School of Management SKOLKOVO

Vardanyan through his philanthropic activities has been involved with Pushkin Museum council, Russian National Orchestra and The American Russian Youth Orchestra. He co-founded Moscow School of Management SKOLKOVO and was its president from 2006 to 2011. As of 2019, Vardanyan holds is the vice-chairman at the Skolkovo advisory board. Vardanyan also heads the supervisory board at Skolkovo Institute for Emerging Market Studies (SIEMS). From 2000 till 2016, Vardanyan was a member of the university endowment supervisory board at Russian New Economic School, During 2008-09 he was one of the members of the advisory board. He had previously held served in supervisory boards of Russian Presidential Academy of National Economy and Public Administration (since 2014), MSU Faculty of Economics (2014-2017), international councils at Brazilian Fundação Dom Cabral' (since 2009), Japanese International Christian University (2011-2015), and GuangHua management school in China.

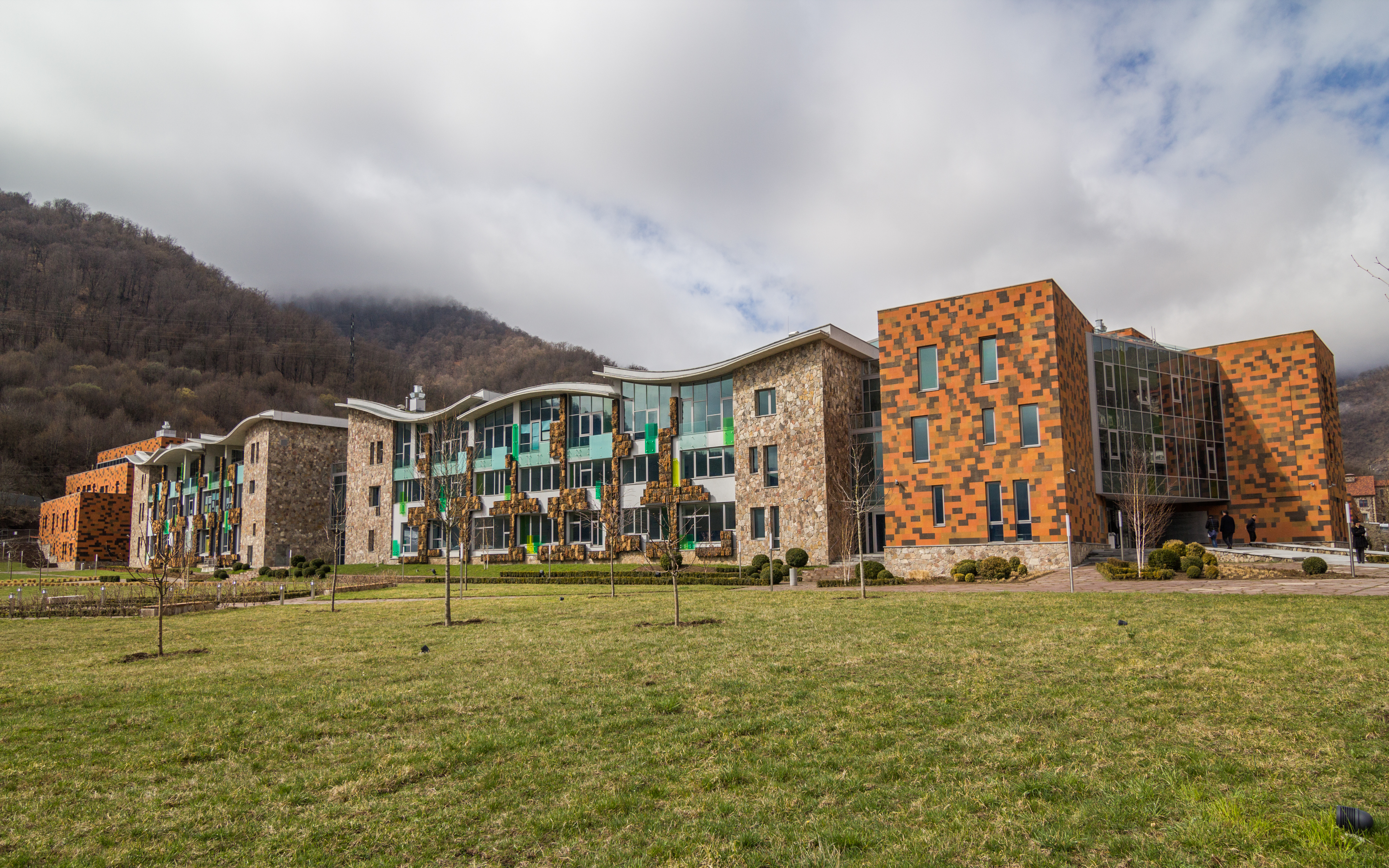
United World College Dilijan

In 2013 Vardanyan, together with Veronika Zonabend and Partners, established UWC Dilijan College. The college is an international boarding school aimed at educating exceptionally talented youth, located in the Armenian city of Dilijan.

In early 2000s Ruben Vardanyan and Noubar Afeyan initiated the Armenia 2020 project. Vardanyan's philanthropic organization IDea Foundation undertakes the Tatev Revival Project that supports the restoration of Tatev Monastery in southern Armenia. Vardanyan has supported other restoration initiatives, such as that of the Saint George's Church in Tbilisi in 2015. Vardanyan was one of the benefactors of the Armenian Cathedral of Moscow, consecrated in 2017. In May 2017, the restored Holy Mother of God Church was opened Mushkapat, Artsakh. in 2019, the restoration of Yukhari Govhar Agha Mosque in Shusha was supported by Vardanyan's Revival of Oriental Historical Heritage Foundation.

In 2016 the Foundation for Armenian Science and Technology was established jointly by Vardanyan, Noubar Afeyan, Fr. Mesrop Aramian and Artur Alaverdyan. In 2014 Vardanyan also co-funded the prize money of the Aurora Prize for Awakening Humanity jointly with Noubar Afeyan, and Vartan Gregorian.

Ilya Shumanov, president of Transparency International Russia, accused Vardanyan in January 2024 of only pretending to be a philanthropist "rather than like someone who is taking money out of the bank and working with dubious, corrupt individuals who, as is now evident, are the ones who started this war."

== Controversies ==
=== Sanction by Ukraine ===
Following the Russian invasion of Ukraine, Vardanyan was placed on the Ukrainian government's list of sanctioned people for his role as a board member of the Russian air cargo company Volga Dnepr, which plays a major role in Russian military air transport. According to Kyiv, his commercial ventures "undermine or threaten Ukraine's territorial integrity, sovereignty, and independence." He is wanted by the Ukrainian Secret Service (SSU).

=== Troika laundromat ===
On 4 March 2019, the Organized Crime and Corruption Reporting Project (OCCRP) published an investigation on the Troika laundromat, reporting on its network of 76 offshore companies, facilitating around $4.6 bln. Ruben Vardanyan was the head of Troika Dialog at the time. He supposedly provided a loan to a business that was a part of the plan, according to one document that bears his signature, but the OCCRP claims there is no "definitive evidence" that he was aware of the fraud.

According to Vardanyan, who was mentioned by the OCCRP, his bank did not do anything improper, and was run similarly to other investment banks at the time. He did point out, however, that he "couldn't possibly know" about every transaction that his bank carried out on behalf of customers. Lithuanian government prosecutors raised concerns about the bank's transfers being too lightly inspected. Data shows that shell company named Quantus sent nearly $500,000 to pay Vardanyan's credit card bills. Other than that, his wife and mother-in-law received 935,000 euros and 900,000 euros respectively.

On March 14, 2019, 22 members of EU Parliament from 14 countries including Lithuania, Germany, the United Kingdom, Belgium, Finland, Sweden and Poland wrote an open letter to Jean-Claude Juncker – president of the European Commission – asking that he take "appropriate measures" against Troika Dialog and Vardanyan.

=== U.S. sanctions draft and alleged complicity with the Kremlin ===
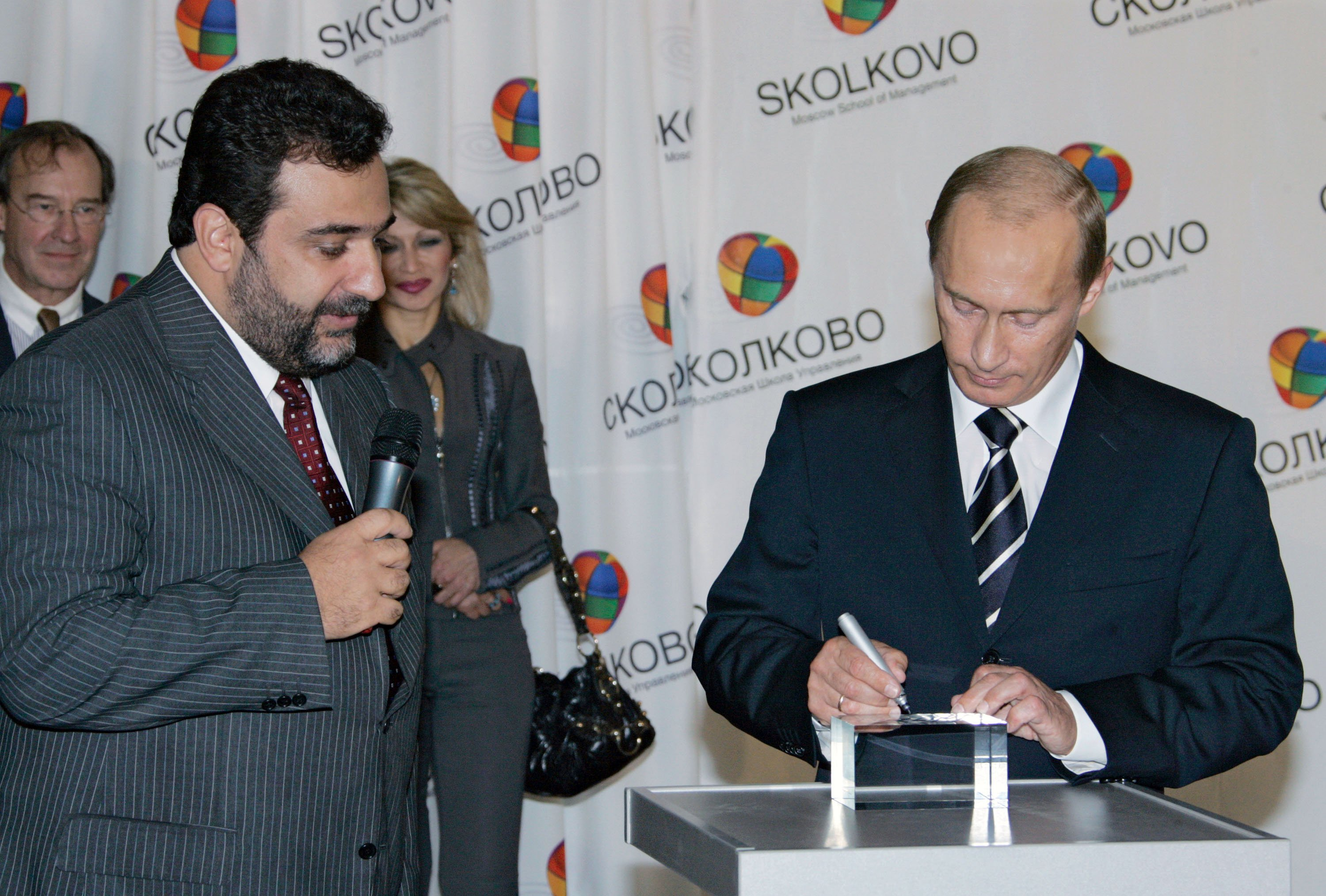
Vardanyan and Putin at the ceremony to launch the construction of the Moscow School of Management

In January 2022, Ruben Vardanyan was listed as one of several individuals that the Biden administration was considering to place under sanctions in House Resolution 6422, formally known as the Putin Accountability Act. The bill was never passed and has had no action since November 2022.

Eight months later, Vardanyan renounced his Russian citizenship and moved to Azerbaijan's breakaway Nagorno-Karabakh region. Some people suggested that that move was intended to avoid sanctions, but Vardanyan refuted this idea, saying “If sanctions were my concern, I'd choose Uruguay. It boasts wonderful weather, affordable cuisine, and excellent soccer. To suggest that sanctions prompted my move to Artsakh is to wildly misconstrue the situation.

Other sources, in Azerbaijan, Armenia and elsewhere, including Brenda Shaffer, a lobbyist for Azerbaijan, suggested that he was sent by the Kremlin in order to disrupt peace talks and bolster Russia's influence in the region. Specifically, questions were raised about Vardanyan's ability to abandon his Russian citizenship so fast. The process takes 6 to 12 months for average individuals, and you have to gather a lot of paperwork. He has close ties to Vladimir Putin.

In some Armenian circles, Vardanyan was accused of and criticized for supposedly suggesting that Armenia be subjected to the Russian Federation in much the same way as the autonomous republic of Tatarstan. Vardanyan denied this, saying that rather "Pashinyan is doing so that the Republic of Armenia can become a part of Russia."

=== Urge to remove Vardanyan from the Nobel Peace Prize list ===
In April 2024, the official representative office in Ukraine of the International Nobel Information Center sent an appeal to the Norwegian Nobel Committee, signed by 18 people's deputies of the Verkhovna Rada of Ukraine, which contains a call to reject the candidacy of Russian billionaire Ruben Vardanyan as a nominee for the Nobel Peace Prize.

A little later, in May of the same year, the Parliamentary Group of the Romanian Parliament of the National Liberal Party called for Vardanian's withdrawal from the list of candidates for the Nobel Peace Prize, labeling him an "enemy of Ukraine" and "sponsor of Russian aggression in the post-Soviet territories". At the same time, 12 other members of the Romanian House of Representatives, including Romanian MEP Cristian Terheș, signed letters with similar appeals.

On May 11 of the same year, a parliamentary majority of 71 members of the Seimas of Lithuania signed a collective letter calling on the Nobel Committee to reject the candidacy of billionaire Ruben Vardanyan for the Nobel Peace Prize in 2024 and any subsequent years.

== Personal life ==
Vardanyan is married to Veronika Zonabend, who is of Jewish origin, but was baptized into the Armenian Apostolic Church. Zonabend is the co-founder of the Armenian UWC Dilijan College. She also holds a post at the American University of Armenia advisory board. Zonabend is the head of the executive board at the Teach For Armenia Educational Foundation.

Vardanyan's elder sister Marine Ales is a composer and songwriter, a member of the Aurora Prize Creative Council, and co-founder of the Grant Life Armenia charity fund.

== Awards ==
In 1999, Vardanyan was recognized as the Businessman of the Year by American Chamber of Commerce in Russia. For the subsequent couple of years he was named the "best business manager on Russia's capital market" by Career magazine. Ernst & Young recognized Vardanyan as the Entrepreneur of the Year in 2004. The National Association of Stock Market participants declared Vardanyan as the "investment banker of the year" in 2004 during the "stock market elite" competition. Russian GQ named him as "Man of the Year" as Best Entrepreneur in 2010. In 2001 Fortune magazine included Vardanyan in its list of "25 Rising Stars of the New Generation". The same year, Vardanyan was included in the list of "100 Global Leaders of Tomorrow" at the World Economic Forum.

Vardanyan was awarded the Order of St. Mesrop Mashtots by the President of Armenia in 2011, the Order of Saint Gregory the Illuminator by Armenian Church in 2013, and Order of Friendship by the president of Tatarstan Rustam Minnikhanov in 2018. The same year, Vardanyan received the Academy of International Business Presidential Award for contribution to the development of education, and, with co-founder of the Aurora humanitarian initiative Noubar Afeyan, the Search for Common Ground prize to honor accomplishments in conflict resolution, negotiation, community building, and peace-building.

Political offices
Preceded by Artak Beglaryan	State Minister of Artsakh; 2022–2023	Succeeded by Gurgen Nersisyan
