= Third Sahakyan government =

Former government of the Republic of Artsakh (2017–2020)

Government of Bako Sahakyan
- government of Artsakh

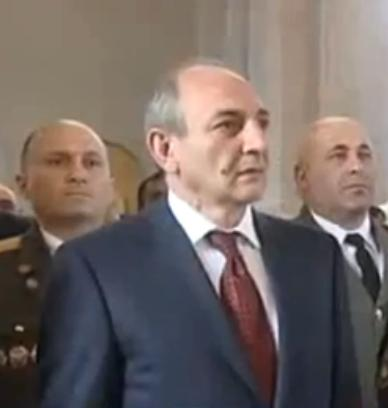
- Date formed: 25 September 2017
- Date dissolved: 21 May 2020

People and organisations
- Head of state: Bako Sahakyan
- Head of government: Bako Sahakyan
- No. of ministers: 12
- Member parties: Free Motherland; Armenian Revolutionary Federation; Democratic Party
- Status in legislature: Coalition
- Opposition parties: Movement 88; National Revival
- Opposition leader: Eduard Aghabekyan

History
- Predecessor: Second Sahakyan government
- Successor: Harutyunyan government

Sahakyan's government was the governing body of Artsakh from 25 September 2017 to 21 May 2020. It is the first cabinet after constitutional referendum in 2017, after which the country was transitioned from a semi-presidential system to a presidential system. As a result, presidential elections were delayed until 2020 in order to be held alongside legislative elections. In July 2017 the National Assembly elected the President for the next three years until the general election. 28 members of National Assembly voted for Bako Sahakyan, 4 of them voted for Eduard Aghabekyan, while one of the MPs did not vote for any of the candidates.

This was a coalition government formed by three parliamentary groups: Free Motherland, Armenian Revolutionary Federation, and Democratic Party.

The structure of the government of Artsakh consists of twelve ministries and three other bodies. Each ministry is responsible for elaborating and implementing governmental decisions in its respective sphere.

== Structure ==
Office	Name	Party
President	Bako Sahakyan	Independent
State Minister	Grigory Martirosyan	Independent
Minister of Economy and Industrial Infrastructures	Levon Grigoryan	Independent
Minister of Nature Protection and Natural Resources	Felix Gabrielyan	Independent
Minister of Agriculture	Zhirayr Mirzoyan	Independent
Minister of Culture, Youth Affairs and Tourism	Lernik Hovhannisyan	ARF
Minister of Defence	Levon Mnatsakanyan	Independent
Minister of Education Science and Sport	Narine Aghabalyan	Independent
Minister of Finance	Artur Harutyunyan	Independent
Minister of Foreign Affairs	Masis Mayilyan	Independent
Minister of Healthcare	Arayik Baghryan	Independent
Minister of Justice	Ararat Danielyan	Independent
Minister of Labour, Social Affairs and Resettlement	Samvel Avanesyan	Independent
Minister of Urban Planning	Karen Shahramanyan	Independent
Director of National Security Service	Samvel Shahramanyan	Independent
Chief of Police	Igor Grigoryan	Independent
Director of state service of emergency situations	Karen Sargsyan	Independent
