= Narine Aghabalyan =

Armenian journalist and politician

- Նարինե Աղաբալյան

Minister of Education, Science and Sport of Artsakh
- In office 25 September 2017 – 21 May 2020
- President: Bako Sahakyan
- Preceded by: Slavik Arayan
- Succeeded by: Lusine Gharakhanyan

Minister of Culture and Youth of Artsakh
- In office 15 June 2009 – 25 September 2017
- President: Bako Sahakyan
- Preceded by: Lerik Hakobyan
- Succeeded by: Sargis Shakhverdyan

Personal details
- Born: 27 December 1967 (age 58) Stepanakert, Nagorno-Karabakh Autonomous Oblast, Soviet Union
- Children: 1
- Education: Artsakh University

Narine Eduardi Aghabalyan (Armenian: Նարինե Էդուարդի Աղաբալյան, born 27 December 1967) is an Armenian journalist and politician who served in the Sahakyan government of the de facto independent Republic of Artsakh. She was the Minister of Culture and Youth from 2009 to 2017 and Minister of Education, Science and Sports from 2017 to 2020.

== Biography ==
Aghabalyan was born on 27 December 1967, in Stepanakert. She graduated from Stepanakert secondary school No. 2. In 1990, she graduated from the philological faculty of the Stepanakert branch of the Vanadzor Pedagogical Institute.

From 1988 to 1995, Aghabalyan worked as an announcer for Artsakh Public TV, and in 1995-2005 as an editor. By 2004, she became a correspondent for the Public Television Company of Armenia in NKR. In 2005, she founded her studio “Tsir Katin” (“Ծիր Կաթին”).

By decree of President Bako Sahakyan, on 15 June 2009, Aghabalyan was appointed Minister of Culture and Youth and reappointed on 22 September 2012. By the decree of Sahakyan on 25 September 2017, she was appointed Minister of Education, Science and Sports, replacing Slavik Asryan.

== Personal life ==
Aghabalyan was married to Edmon Barseghyan who was killed in the First Nagorno-Karabakh War and has a son.

== Awards ==
In 2001, Aghabalyan was recognized by the National Assembly of the Nagorno-Karabakh Republic as “Best Journalist of the Year.” In 2008, by decree of the President of Artsakh, she was awarded the “Vachagan Barepasht” medal (“Վաչագան Բարեպաշտ”).
