= Gurgen Nersisyan =

Armenian politician from the Republic of Artsakh

- Գուրգեն Ներսիսյան

State Minister of Artsakh
- In office 24 February 2023 – 31 August 2023
- President: Arayik Harutyunyan
- Preceded by: Ruben Vardanyan
- Succeeded by: Samvel Shahramanyan

Personal details
- Born: 15 October 1985 (age 40) Stepanakert, Nagorno-Karabakh Autonomous Oblast, Soviet Union

Gurgen Garniki Nersisyan (Armenian: Գուրգեն Գառնիկի Ներսիյան; born 15 October 1985) is an Armenian politician from the Republic of Artsakh. He was the State Minister of Artsakh from February to August 2023. He also served as the Prosecutor General of Artsakh from 2021 to 2023.

== Early life and education ==
Nersisyan was born on 15 October 1985 in Stepanakert, in what was then the Nagorno-Karabakh Autonomous Oblast. He studied at School No. 10 named after Isahakyan and graduated from Artsakh University in 2007.

== Political career ==
Nersisyan began his career in 2007 in the prosecutor's office of Artsakh, where he worked in various positions. On 11 February 2021, he was elected Prosecutor General by the National Assembly. After the resignation of Ruben Vardanyan from the post of State Minister, President Arayik Harutyunyan appointed Nersisyan to the vacated position on 23 February 2023. He held on to this post until 31 August 2023.

== Personal life ==
Nersisyan is married, has a son and two daughters.
