= Artak Beglaryan =

Armenian politician (born 1988)

- Արտակ Բեգլարյան

State Minister of Artsakh
- In office 1 June 2021 – 3 November 2022
- President: Arayik Harutyunyan
- Preceded by: Grigory Martirosyan
- Succeeded by: Ruben Vardanyan

Personal details
- Born: 5 July 1988 (age 38) Stepanakert, Nagorno-Karabakh Autonomous Oblast, Soviet Union
- Education: Yerevan State University

Artak Artyomi Beglaryan (Armenian: Արտակ Արտյոմի Բեգլարյան, born 5 July 1988) is an Armenian politician. He served as the State Minister of the de facto independent Republic of Artsakh from 2021 to 2022. He also previously served as Ombudsman of Artsakh from 2018 until 2020.

== Early life and education ==
Artak Artyomi Beglaryan was born on 5 July 1988 in Stepanakert, Nagorno-Karabakh Autonomous Oblast. His father fought in the First Nagorno-Karabakh War, participated in the Battle of Martakert and was killed during the Battle of Lachin. At the age of seven, Beglaryan was injured by the explosion of a wartime mine found by his friends. As a result of the detonation, he lost his sight and suffered multiple burns to his face.

Beglaryan studied at Yerevan Specialized School No. 14 for Children with Visual Impairments (1995–2006). He learned Braille at school. His mother died when he was 16.

After graduating from high school, Beglaryan entered the Faculty of International Relations at Yerevan State University, where he completed a bachelor's degree in political science in 2010. Through student exchange programs, he studied in Greece, the UK, the US, the Czech Republic, and Switzerland. Artak planned to study at the Diplomatic School of the Ministry of Foreign Affairs of Armenia, but was denied admission to the exams, citing his blindness. Ultimately, in 2018, he completed his postgraduate studies at the National Defense Research University of the Ministry of Defense of the Republic of Armenia, defending his dissertation on the topic "Features of the process of formation and development of the political system in the Republic of Artsakh".

== Social and political activities ==
During his studies, Beglaryan became one of the initiators of the "Learn Armenia" club, which organized hiking trips. In addition, in Nagorno-Karabakh, he founded the public organization "Kamk" ("Will"), which conducted educational events. He was a member of the youth parliament at the National Assembly of the Nagorno-Karabakh Republic (2011–2012). At the age of 24, he climbed Mount Ararat with a group of 15 people.

Beglaryan began his career at the Orakarg newspaper, where he worked as a columnist from December 2011 to June 2012. From June to December 2012, he was an analyst at the Artsakh Today Information and Analysis Center. From 2014 to 2018, he was a visiting lecturer at Artsakh State University.

Subsequently, Beglaryan worked with the Prime Minister of the Nagorno-Karabakh Republic, Arayik Harutyunyan. Initially as an assistant (2012–2013), and then as a press secretary (2013–2017). From November 2017 to January 2018, he was an advisor to the State Minister of Artsakh.

Beglaryan founded the youth organization "Artsakhkertum". In 2016, he became a member of the board of trustees of the Shusha Technological University. In 2018, he headed the Union of the Blind of Artsakh.

In February 2018, Beglaryan became the head of the office of the Human Rights Defender of Artsakh. In October 2018, the Free Motherland party and the Motherland faction nominated Beglaryan for the post of Ombudsman of the Nagorno-Karabakh Republic (officially, the Human Rights Defender of Artsakh). As a result of the vote in the National Assembly, 29 out of 33 deputies supported his candidacy. He served in this position from November 2018 to December 2020. In 2019, he delivered a report to the Parliamentary Assembly of the Council of Europe. During the Second Nagorno-Karabakh War, he remained in the unrecognized republic and informed the public about what was happening, as well as assisted international organizations in collecting evidence.

On 24 December 2020, President Arayik Harutyunyan appointed Beglaryan as the head of the Artsakh presidential administration.

On 1 June 2021, Beglaryan was appointed as the State Minister, serving in this position until 3 November 2022. In November 2022, he moved to the position of Advisor to the State Minister, where he served until 31 August 2023.

== Exile ==
In the wake of the 2023 Azerbaijani offensive, Beglaryan fled Nagorno-Karabakh and moved to Yerevan.
