= Noubar Afeyan =

American-Canadian entrepreneur, inventor, and philanthropist

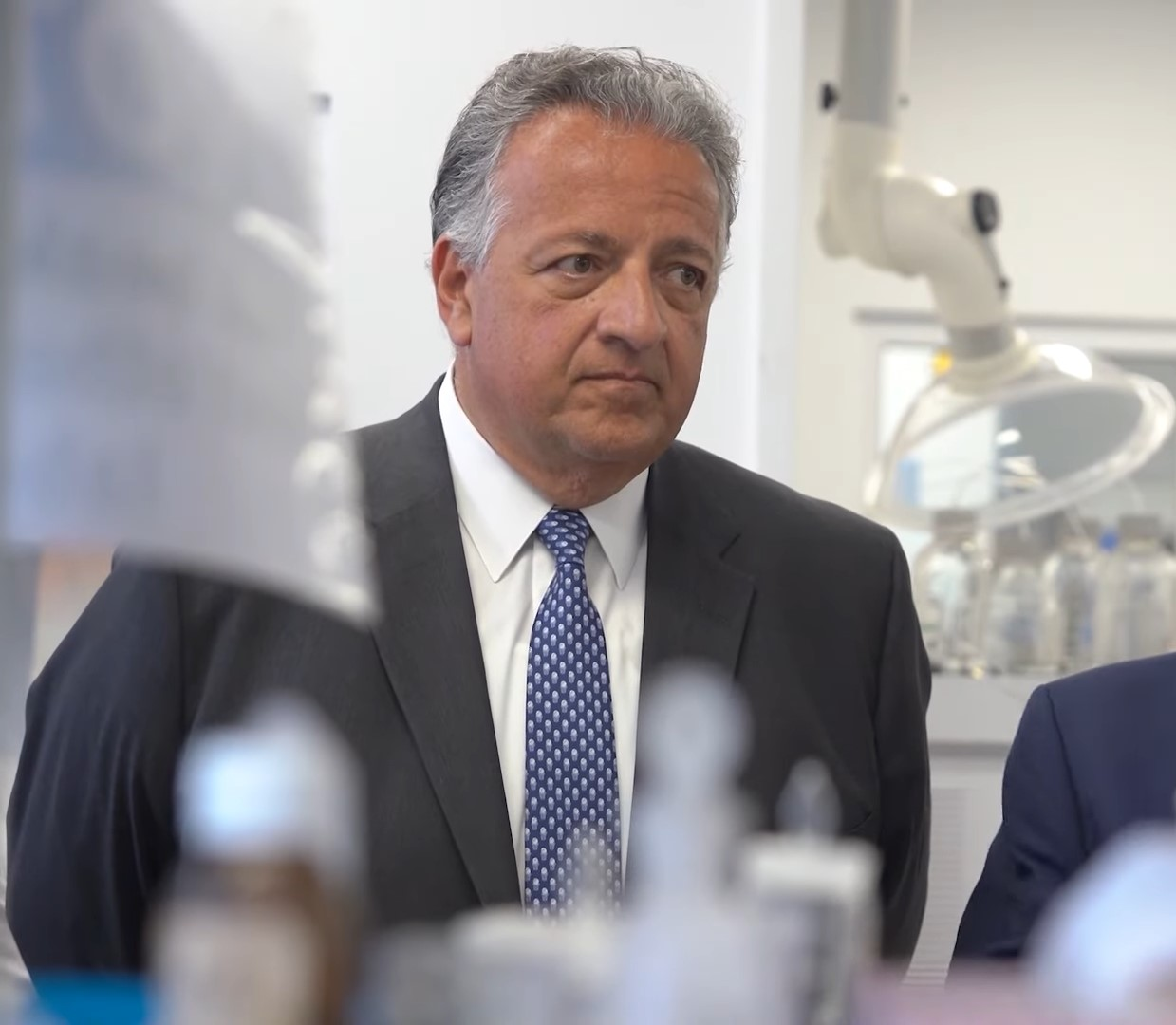
- Afeyan in 2022
- Born: July 25, 1962 (age 64); Beirut, Lebanon
- Education: McGill University (BS); Massachusetts Institute of Technology (PhD)
- Years active: 1986–present
- Known for: Co-founding Moderna, Flagship Pioneering, Aurora Prize
- Spouse: Anna Gunnarson
- Children: 4

Noubar Afeyan (Western Armenian: Նուպար Աֆէեան; born in 1962) is an American-Canadian billionaire businessman, inventor, and philanthropist. He is best known for co-founding the biotechnology company Moderna, through his venture capital firm, Flagship Pioneering, and for co-founding humanitarian projects such as Aurora Prize and The Future Armenian. As of November 2021, his net worth is estimated at $3.3 billion. He was awarded the National Medal of Technology and Innovation in 2025.

== Personal life ==
Afeyan was born to Armenian parents in Beirut, Lebanon in 1962. His grandfather survived the Armenian genocide. Talking about his background, Afeyan said: "One of the only unfortunate advantages Armenians have had by having gone through a genocide and having spread around the world is that we do have an experience of escaping and of immigrating and of constantly restarting." His family fled Lebanon in 1975, during the civil war there. He graduated from Loyola High School in Montreal in 1978. He received his B.Eng. in chemical engineering from McGill University in 1983 and then moved to the US and earned a Ph.D. in biochemical engineering from the Massachusetts Institute of Technology (MIT) in 1987. He was the first Ph.D. graduate from MIT's Center for Bioprocess Engineering, at the time the only institution with that degree program. He became a U.S. citizen in 2008.

Besides English, Afeyan speaks Western Armenian. Afeyan is married to Anna (born Gunnardottir), a Swedish-born engineer who moved to the US in 1988. They have four children, and currently reside in Lexington, Massachusetts.

== Academic career and inventions ==
Afeyan has authored numerous scientific papers. He has patented over 100 inventions. Between 2000 and 2016 he was a senior lecturer at the MIT Sloan School of Management and is currently (as of 2020) a lecturer at Harvard Business School.

In July 2022, Afeyan was conferred with an honorary doctorate degree from Yerevan State University.

== Business career ==
Afeyan was inspired by a meeting in 1985 with David Packard to become an entrepreneur. He started his first biotechnology company in 1987, just a few days before Black Monday, and founded or co-founded five more companies within ten years. By 2020 Afeyan had co-founded and developed 41 start-ups. In total, he co-founded or helped build over 50 life science and technology startups.

Afeyan is the founder and CEO of Flagship Pioneering, a venture capital company focused on biotechnology, in 2000. The firm has "fostered the development of more than 100 scientific ventures, resulting in $20 billion in total value and over 500 patents." According to the company website, Flagship Pioneering has "fostered the development of more than 100 scientific ventures resulting in $30 billion in aggregate value, thousands of patents and patent applications, and more than 50 drugs in clinical development."

In 2009 Afeyan co-founded Moderna (formerly ModeRNA Therapeutics) and currently serves as its chairman. He owns over 2 million shares in the company; in 2018, Moderna had the biggest IPO in the biotech industry's history.

In 2021, Afeyan announced that Moderna would not enforce its patent rights against anyone using those patents to make COVID-19 vaccines.

In 1988, he founded PerSeptive Biosystems and served as its CEO. The company's annual revenues grew to $100 million and in 1998 was acquired by PerkinElmer/Applera and became CBO of Applera. There he oversaw the creation of Celera Genomics.

== Philanthropy ==
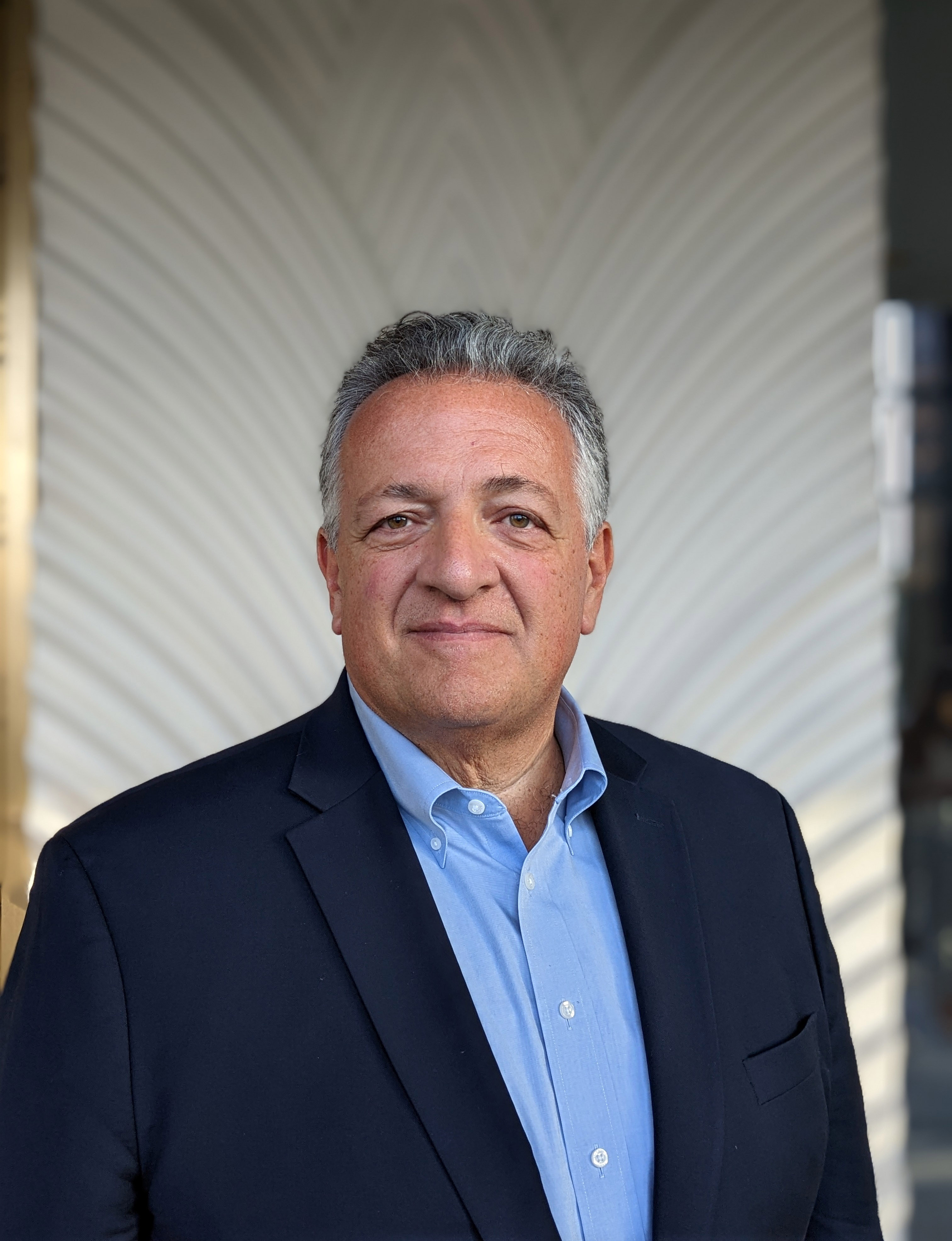
Noubar Afeyan at FAST Global Innovation Forum 2022, Yerevan, Armenia

Afeyan sits on the boards of the MIT Corporation, the Boston Symphony Orchestra, and the Armenian General Benevolent Union (AGBU).

Afeyan has worked closely with other prominent Armenian diaspora philanthropists, most notably Ruben Vardanyan on projects related to Armenia. Afeyan had partnered with Vardanyan to establish Initiatives for Development of Armenia (IDeA), which according to the Armenian government, has between 2007 and 2017 implemented different projects with a total cost of $550 million. Earlier, in 2001 Afeyan, Vardanyan and others launched the "Armenia 2020" initiative, which aimed to identify development prospects for Armenia until 2020. It has since been expanded to 2031. In 2005 Afeyan and Vardanyan met with Armenian president Robert Kocharyan to present the key directions of the project.

In 2008 Afeyan, Vardanyan and others co-founded the National Competitiveness Foundation of Armenia, a private-public partnership dedicated to promoting economic development in the country. As a member of its board, he met with Armenian Prime Minister Tigran Sargsyan in 2009 and 2012.

With Vardanyan and Vartan Gregorian, Afeyan co-founded the Aurora Humanitarian Initiative in 2015. It includes The 100 Lives initiative, which celebrates survivors and rescuers of the Armenian genocide, and the Aurora Prize for Awakening Humanity, an annual award given to an individual (and an affiliated organization) who has faced personal risk to enable others to survive since 2016. In 2020 Armenian Prime Minister Nikol Pashinyan lauded Afeyan, Vardanyan and Gregorian for "glorifying humanity," and "materializ[ing] the noble idea of immortalizing the memory of the innocent victims of the Armenian Genocide."

Afeyan is a member of the board of UWC Dilijan International School in Armenia, founded by Vardanyan in 2014., a founding angel of Foundation for Armenian Science and Technology (FAST). and Future Armenian public initiative.

He points to his immigrant background and mentality as the driving forces of his philanthropic, scientific, and business work.

== Politics ==
In October 2016 Afeyan joined other prominent Armenians on calling the government of Armenia to adopt "new development strategies based on inclusiveness and collective action" and to create "an opportunity for the Armenian world to pivot toward a future of prosperity, to transform the post-Soviet Armenian Republic into a vibrant, modern, secure, peaceful and progressive homeland for a global nation."

After the Velvet Revolution of 2018, Afeyan congratulated Nikol Pashinyan on being elected Armenia's prime minister and wrote that "With this turning point, we have an opportunity to bring together the skills and enthusiasm of Armenians across the globe who are able to contribute to accelerating Armenia’s and Artsakh’s growth and prosperity." In July 2021 Afeyan met with Pashinyan in Yerevan. In March and May 2020, Afeyan and Armenian president Armen Sarkissian discussed the COVID-19 pandemic.

During the 2020 Nagorno-Karabakh war, Afeyan wrote a letter to the editor of The New York Times in which he called for the US to step in and stop the war. "Whether or not the United States and Russia intervene to quell the violence has implications for vulnerable peoples around the world. When world powers step in to stop unfolding atrocities, it sends a signal to aggressors that annexing land or destroying a people and culture will not be tolerated," he wrote.

In November 2020, Afeyan confirmed that the Canadian government had been among the first countries to pre-order the Moderna vaccine; the country is guaranteed to get some portion of the first batch dispensed to the public.

In 2023, Noubar has called on US politicians and judges to stop questioning established science and over-ruling regulators.

== Recognition ==
- Ellis Island Medal of Honor (2008)
- Armenian Prime Minister's Commemorative Medal for Patriotic Activities (2012)
- Technology Pioneer award, World Economic Forum (2012)
- Medal of Services to the Motherland (2014) by President of Armenia Serzh Sargsyan
- Great Immigrants Recipient, Carnegie Corporation of New York (2016)
- Lebanon's Order of Merit, presented by Ambassador Gabriel Issa, on behalf of President Michel Aoun, at the Embassy of Lebanon in Washington D.C. (2021)
- In 2020, Afeyan was recognized as one of four immigrants leading the efforts to find a vaccine for COVID-19.
- In 2022, Afeyan was awarded an honorary Doctor of Science, honoris causa (D.Sc.) from his alma mater McGill University
- In 2021, Afeyan was selected as a Bloomberg New Economy Catalyst.
- In 2024, Afeyan was awarded the Prince of Cilicia medal by His Holiness Aram I of the House of Cilicia branch of the Armenian Apostolic Church
- In 2025, Afeyan was awarded an honorary Doctor of Engineering, honoris causa (D.Sc.) from Worcester Polytechnic Institute

== See also ==
- Ruben Vardanyan
