= State Minister of Artsakh =

Political position

State Minister of the Republic of Artsakh
- Արցախի հանրապետության պետական նախարար (Armenian)
- Coat of arms of Artsakh
- Member of: Cabinet of Artsakh
- Seat: Stepanakert
- Appointer: President of Artsakh
- Inaugural holder: Arayik Harutyunyan
- Formation: 25 September 2017
- Website: gov.nkr.am

The State Minister of Artsakh was a political post in the government of Republic of Artsakh. The position was introduced after constitutional amendments, which were approved in a constitutional referendum in 2017, and after the Prime Minister of Artsakh post was abolished.

Following the Azerbaijani offensive on 19 September 2023, Artsakh agreed to dissolve itself by 1 January 2024, however instead of dissolving, they established a government-in-exile in Yerevan, Armenia. The Prime Minister of Armenia, Nikol Pashinyan, has since severely opposed the government-in-exile's existence in Armenia.

== List of state ministers ==
| No. | Portrait | Name (birth–death) | Term | | | Political party | President |
| No. | Portrait | Name (birth–death) | Took office | Left office | Time in office | Political party | President |
|---|---|---|---|---|---|---|---|
| 1 | | Arayik Harutyunyan (born 1973) | 25 September 2017 | 6 June 2018 | 254 days | Free Motherland | Bako Sahakyan (Cabinet) |
| 2 | | Grigory Martirosyan (born 1978) | 6 June 2018 | 1 June 2021 | 2 years, 360 days | Independent | Bako Sahakyan (Cabinet) |
| 3 | | Artak Beglaryan (born 1988) | 3 June 2021 | 3 November 2022 | 1 year, 153 days | Independent | Arayik Harutyunyan (Cabinet) |
| 4 | | Ruben Vardanyan (born 1968) | 4 November 2022 | 23 February 2023 | 111 days | Independent | Arayik Harutyunyan (Cabinet) |
| 5 | | Gurgen Nersisyan (born 1985) | 24 February 2023 | 31 August 2023 | 188 days | Independent | Arayik Harutyunyan (Cabinet) |
| 6 | | Samvel Shahramanyan (born 1978) | 31 August 2023 | 10 September 2023 | 10 days | Independent | Davit Ishkhanyan |
| 7 | | Artur Harutyunyan (born 1979) | 18 September 2023 | 20 May 2025 | 1 year, 245 days | Free Motherland | Samvel Shahramanyan |
| 8 | | Nzhdeh Iskandaryan[hy] | 20 May 2025 | Incumbent | | Independent | Ashot Danielyan |

== See also ==
- Government of Artsakh
- President of Artsakh
- President of the National Assembly of Artsakh
- Prime Minister of the Nagorno-Karabakh Republic
