= Lusine Gharakhanyan =

Armenian politician from the Republic of Artsakh

- Լուսինե Ղարախանյան

Minister of Education, Science, Culture and Sport of Artsakh
- In office 26 May 2020 – 7 February 2022
- President: Arayik Harutyunyan
- Preceded by: Narine Aghabalyan
- Succeeded by: Anahit Hakobyan

Personal details
- Born: 13 August 1978 (age 48) Askeran, Nagorno-Karabakh Autonomous Oblast, Soviet Union

Lusine Gachai Gharakhanyan (Armenian: Լուսինե Գաչայի Ղարախանյան; born 13 August 1978) is an Armenian psychologist and politician from the Republic of Artsakh. She was the Minister of Education, Science, Culture and Sport in the Harutyunyan government. In 2015, she was awarded the academic title of Associate Professor by the Higher Qualification Committee of Armenia.

== Biography ==
Gharakhanyan was born in Askeran, Nagorno-Karabakh Autonomous Oblast, Armenian SSR, Soviet Union. She studied at the Faculty of Pedagogy and Technology at Artsakh University and received a qualification as a psychologist from 1996 to 2000. Then, she studied at the same university and received a master's degree in psychology. In 2011, she defended his PhD thesis at Yerevan State University and received the degree of Candidate of Psychological Sciences.

In 2001, she taught at Mesrop Mashtots University. Then in 2002, he worked as a leading specialist in the Department of Extracurricular and Youth Affairs of the Ministry of Education, Culture and Sports of the NKR. In 2020, Gharakhanyan was appointed Minister of Education, Science and Culture in the Harutyunyan government. On 30 December 2020, she was appointed as Minister of Education, Science, Culture and Sports. On 7 February 2022, Gharakhanyan was replaced by Anahit Hakobyan in that position and appointed advisor to the president the same day.

In 2020, she relocated to Yerevan, where in January 2024 she was appointed acting director of the Hovhannes Tumanyan Museum by Armenia's Ministry of Education, Science, Culture and Sports.

== Personal life ==
Gharakhanyan is married and has a daughter.
