= UWC Dilijan =

UWC Dilijan College
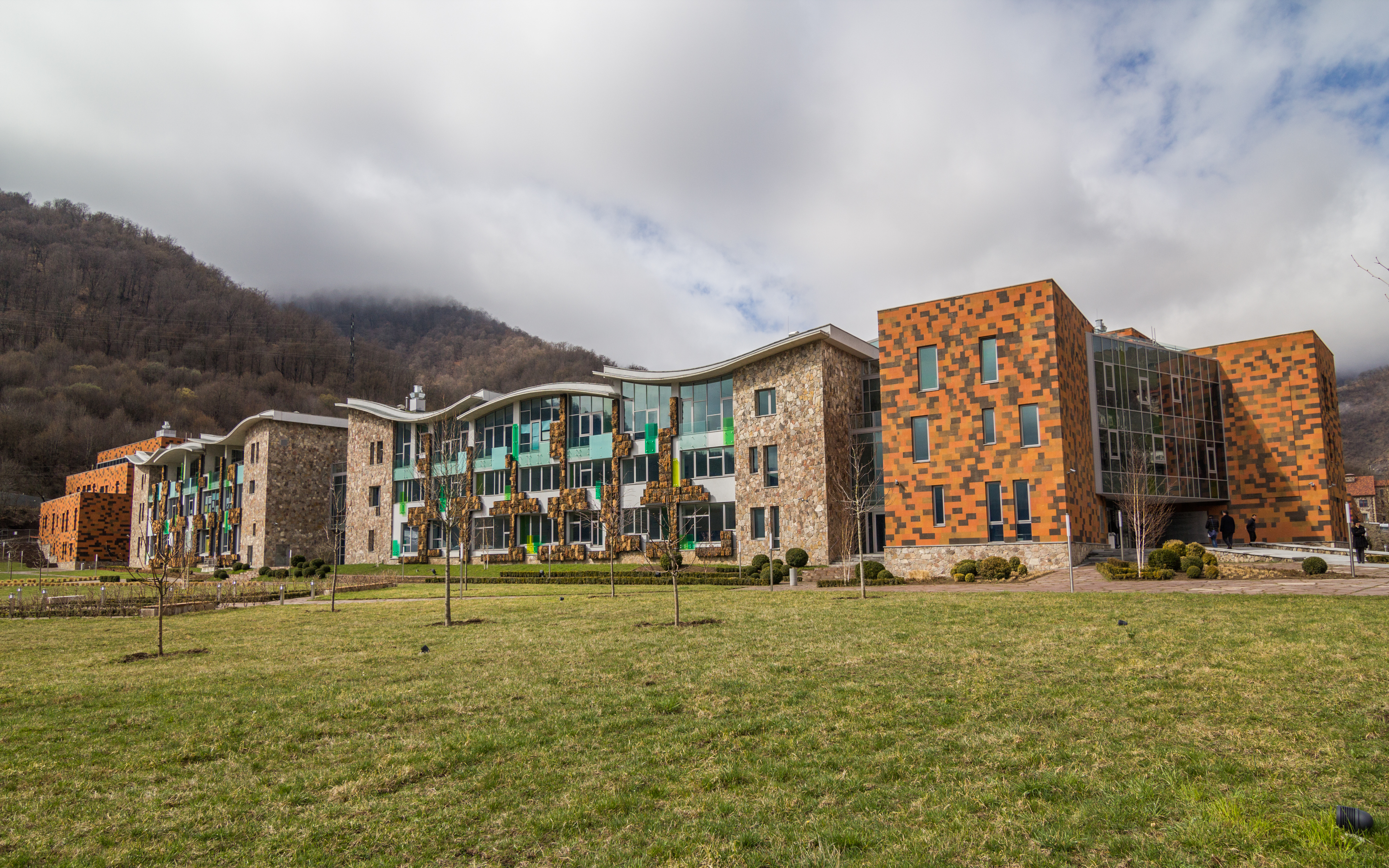

Location
- Getapnya Street 7 Dilijan; Armenia; 40°44′20″N 44°49′57″E

Information
- Type: International Baccalaureate World School
- Established: October 18th 2014; 12 years ago
- Founders: Ruben Vardanyan and Veronika Zonabend
- Oversight: United World Colleges
- Headmaster: Adam Armanski
- Faculty: 42 (from 16 countries)
- Gender: Mixed
- Language: English, German, Russian, Spanish and Armenian
- Website: www.uwcdilijan.org

UWC Dilijan College is the 14th member of the United World Colleges movement, one of eighteen colleges around the world, and the first international boarding school in Armenia. The college matriculated its first 96 IB1 students (11th graders) in September 2014. Currently, the school offers IB Diploma years 1 and 2 (grades 11-12). The school now hosts 227 students and is planning to expand further.

A portion of the school is on the premises of Dilijan National Park.

== Mission ==
UWC Dilijan is a community working towards an equitable and sustainable world through a challenging and transforming education with people from diverse backgrounds.

The mission of the UWC movement and of the school is to "make education a force to unite people, nations and cultures for peace and a sustainable future".

The college aims to be an integral part of Dilijan and to have positive personal, local and global impact.

It uses the International Baccalaureate (IB) Diploma Programme as its curriculum.

== Governance and funding ==
UWC Dilijan evolved from the original idea to create Dilijan International School of Armenia, first conceived in 2006 by Ruben Vardanyan and Veronika Zonabend with the support of other founding patrons (Gagik Adibekyan from Russia, Noubar and Anna Afeyan from United States, Vladimir and Anna Avetissian from Russia and Oleg Mkrtchyan from Ukraine, as well as 4 anonymous patrons).

The college officially opened on 11 October 2014 for the 2014–2015 academic year, in the presence of the president of Armenia Serzh Sargsyan, the president of Serbia Tomislav Nikolić, Catholicos Karekin II of Armenia and Patriarch Mar Ignatius Aphrem II of the Syrian Orthodox Church.

The school is funded by a mix of large philanthropic giving and the support of over 500 donors. $26 million has been raised for scholarships, supporting 86% of students with either full or partial financial support, and $180 million has been contributed for capital and operational costs. Amal Clooney sponsors an annual scholarship for a young woman from Lebanon to attend UWC Dilijan; she and her husband have supported and visited the school.

Upon graduating, UWC Dilijan alum become eligible for the Davis UWC Scholars Program, the world's largest, privately funded, international scholarship program, which supports students' university studies in the United States.

== Students ==
On 28 May 2016, the first graduates of UWC Dilijan, 96 students from around 48 nations worldwide, completed two years of schooling and took part in the inaugural graduation ceremony.

In the academic year 2017-18 UWC Dilijan became home to 213 students from 82 countries. They continue their education in leading universities worldwide such as Yale University, Columbia University, University College London, ETH Zürich, the School of Oriental and African Studies (SOAS), The University of Toronto, McGill University, Stanford University, Brown University, The University of Chicago, Duke University, the Minerva Schools at KGI, Queen Mary University of London, the University of Warwick, The University of California, Berkeley, the University of Edinburgh, the University of Richmond, the University of Rochester, Bennington College and many more.

== Preparatory Years Center Dilijan ==
Preparatory Years Center Dilijan is located on the grounds of UWC Dilijan College, and was originally founded to provide an education to the children of UWC Dilijan College staff. It is currently an international school with over 70 students of nine nationalities and 16 staff members, providing education from Kindergarten to Grade 10. It is accredited by Cambridge Assessment International Education.

== Gallery ==
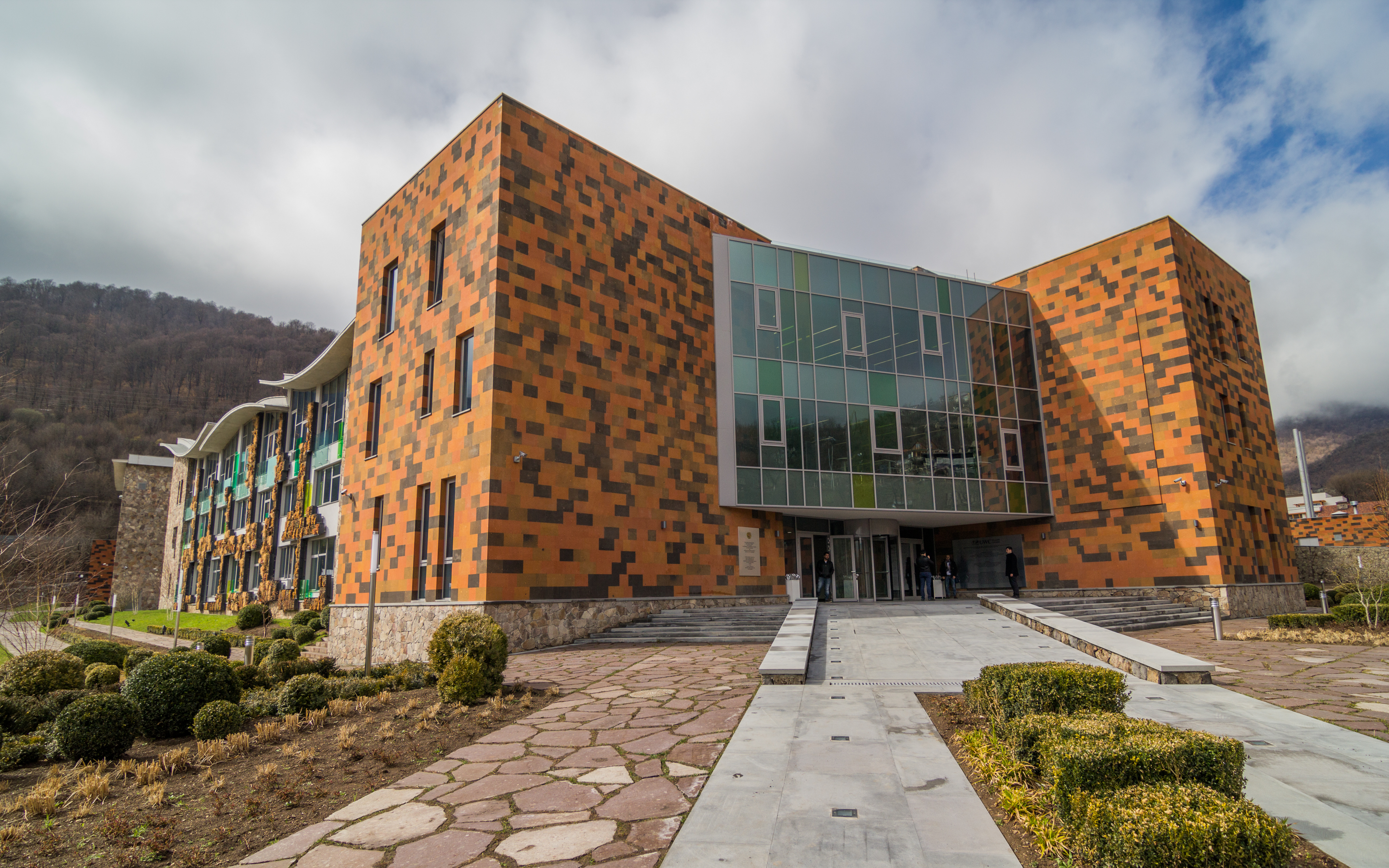
Main entrance to academic building

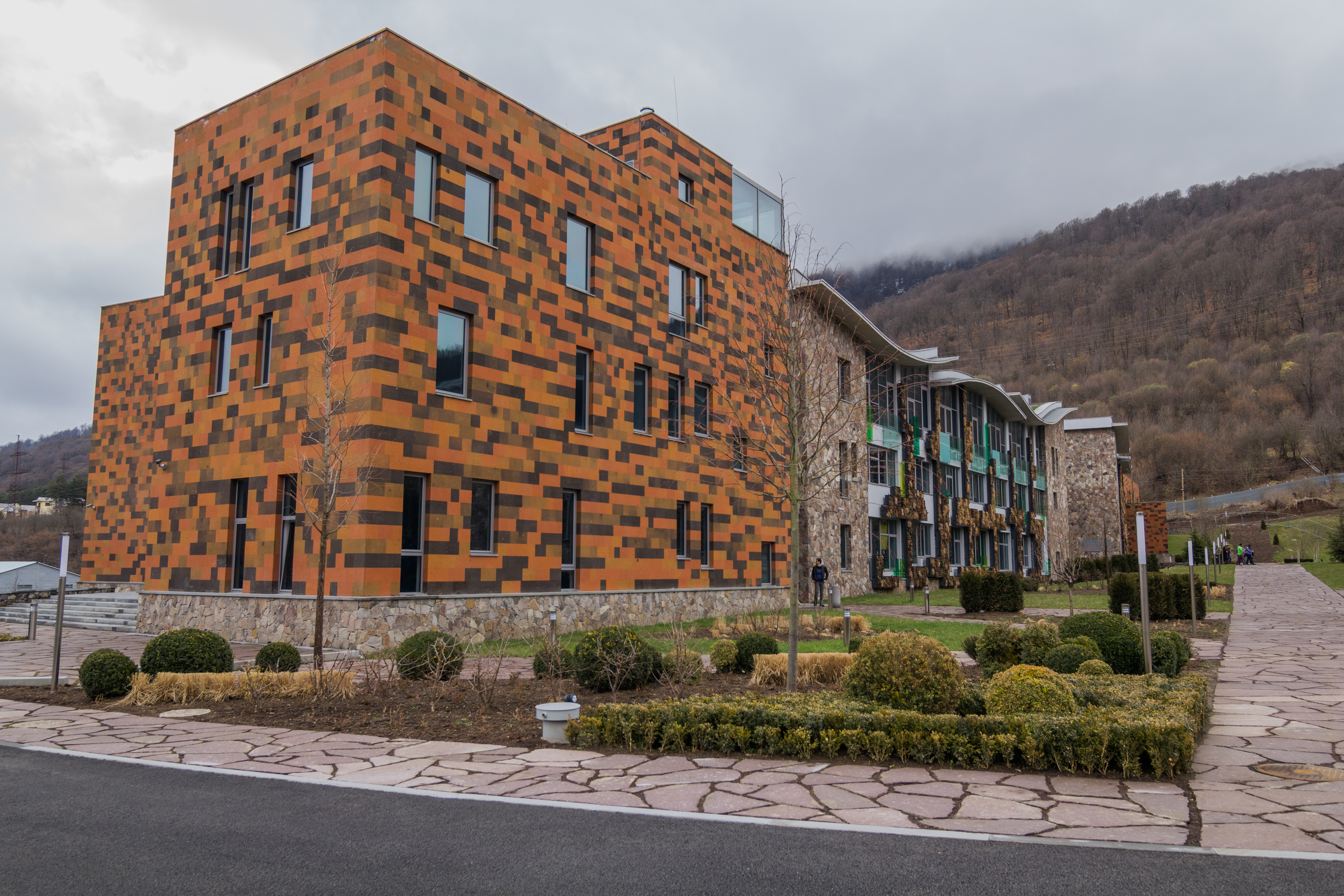
Academic building from the side

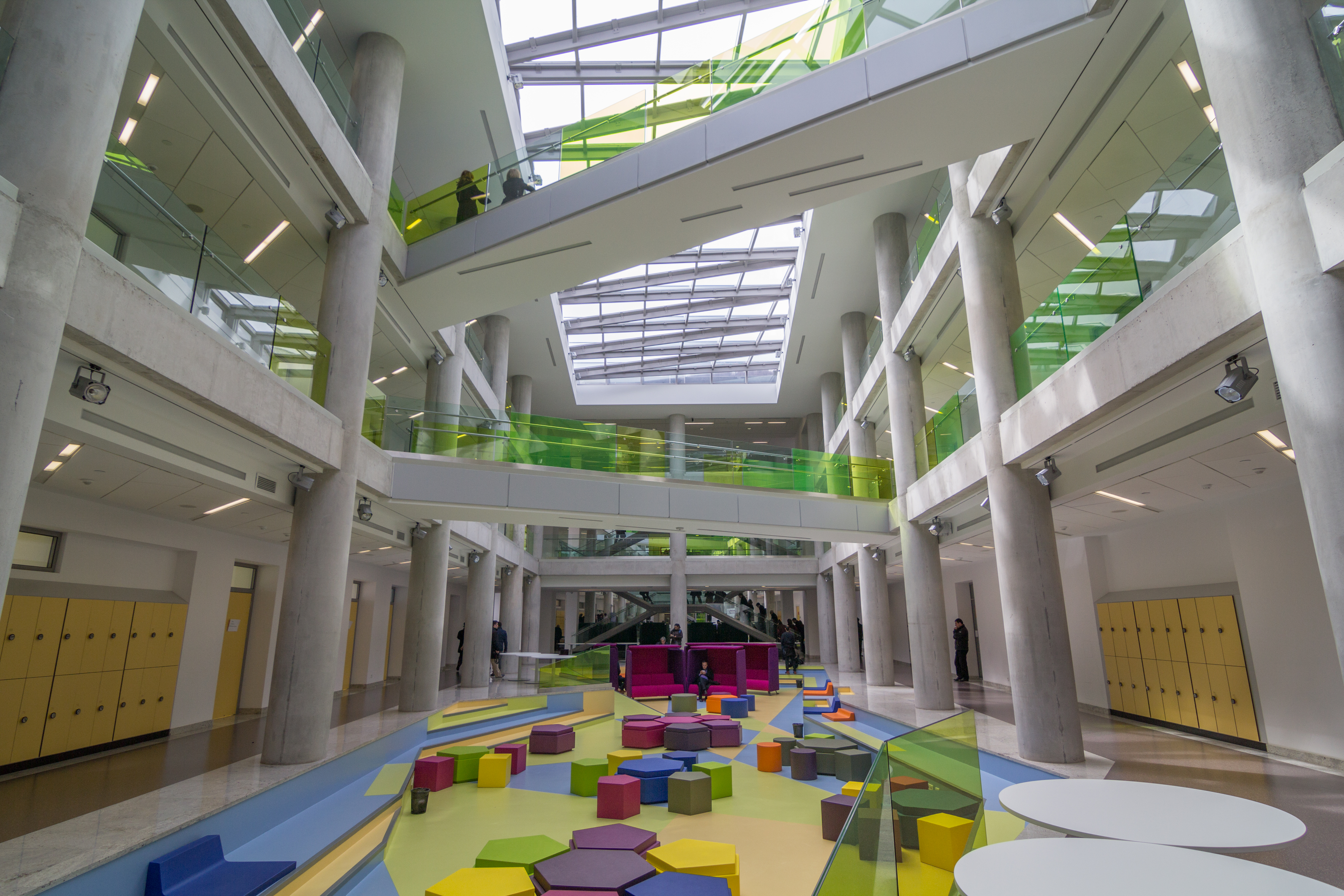
Inside the main building

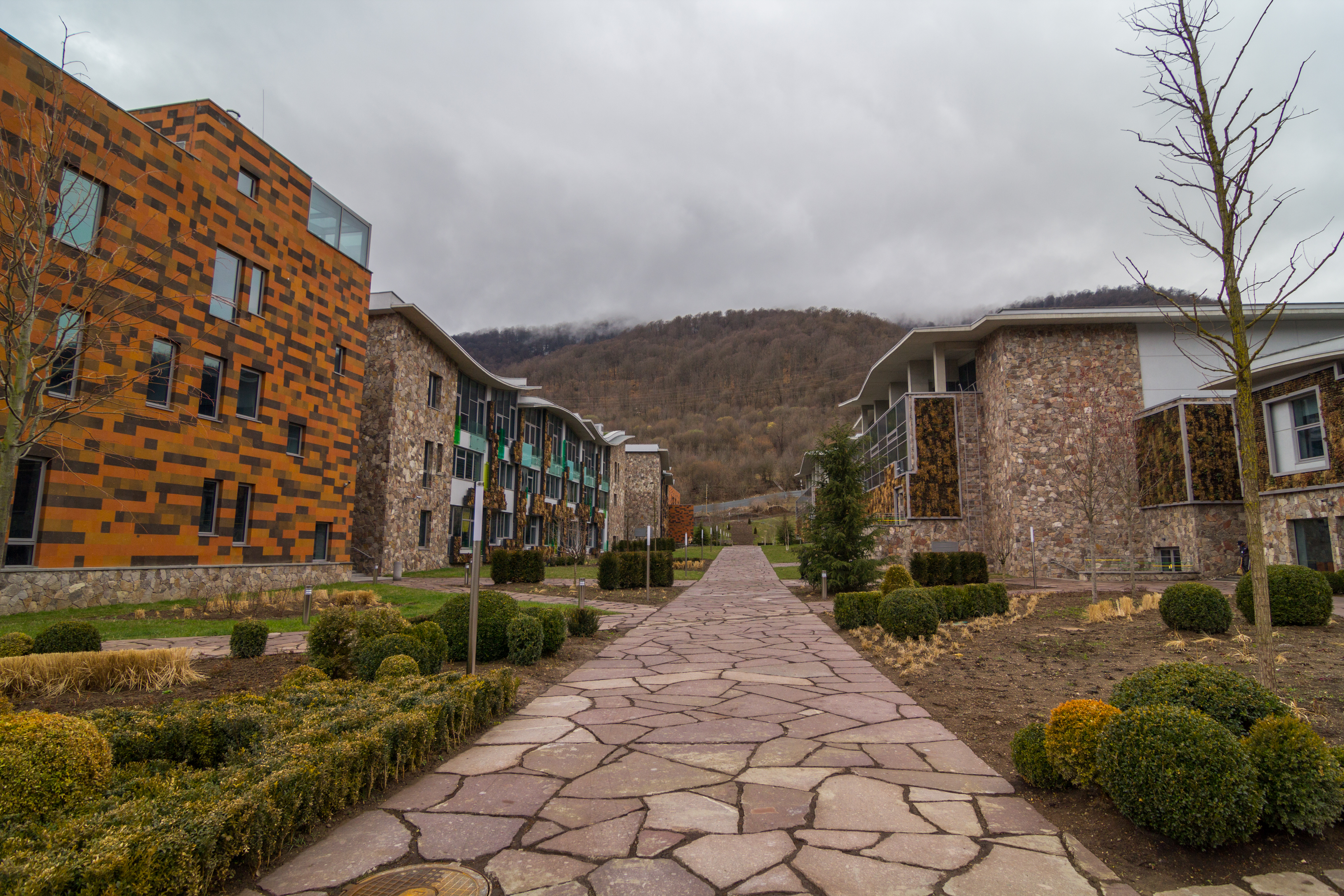
Walkway between the academic and recreational buildings

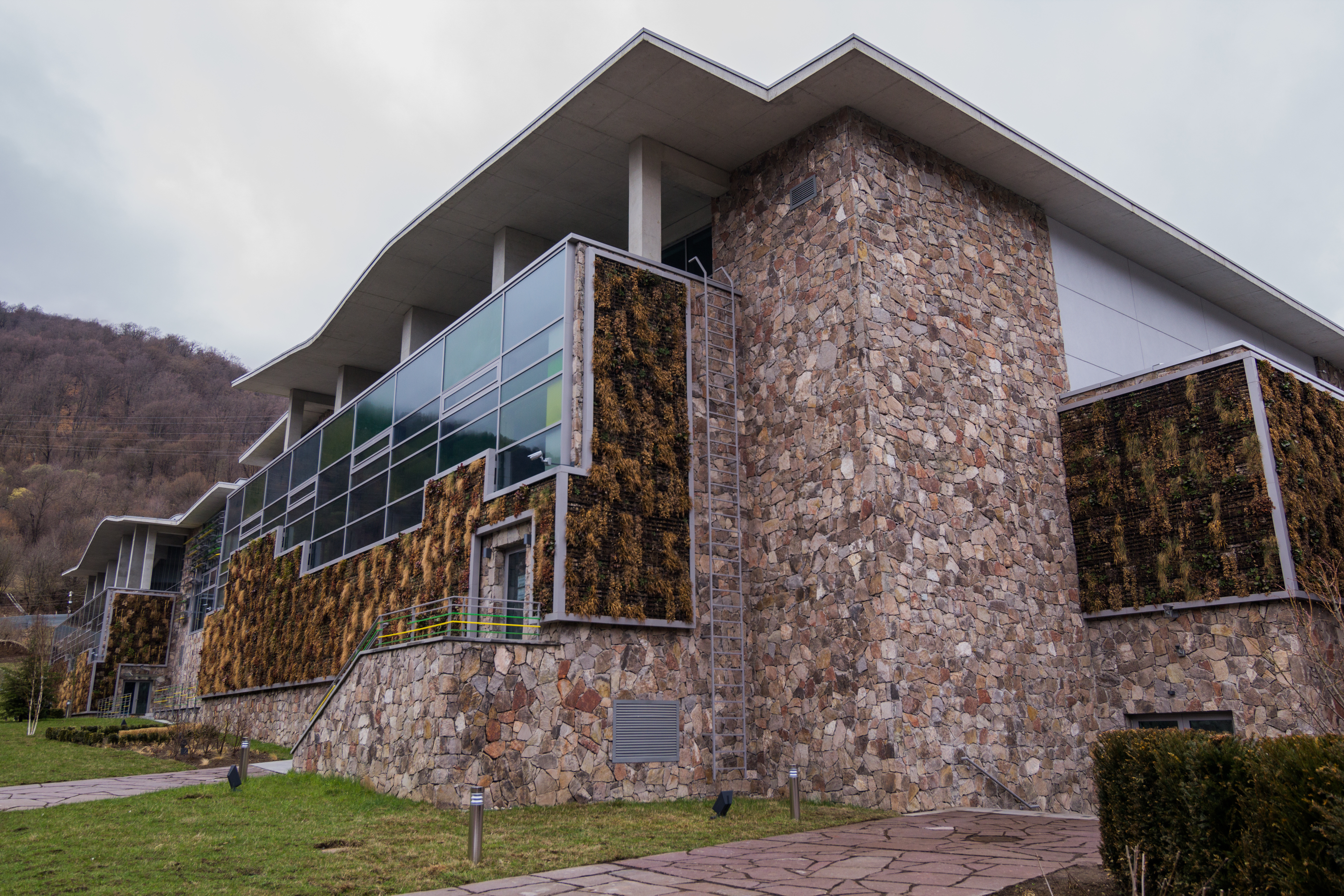
Recreational building

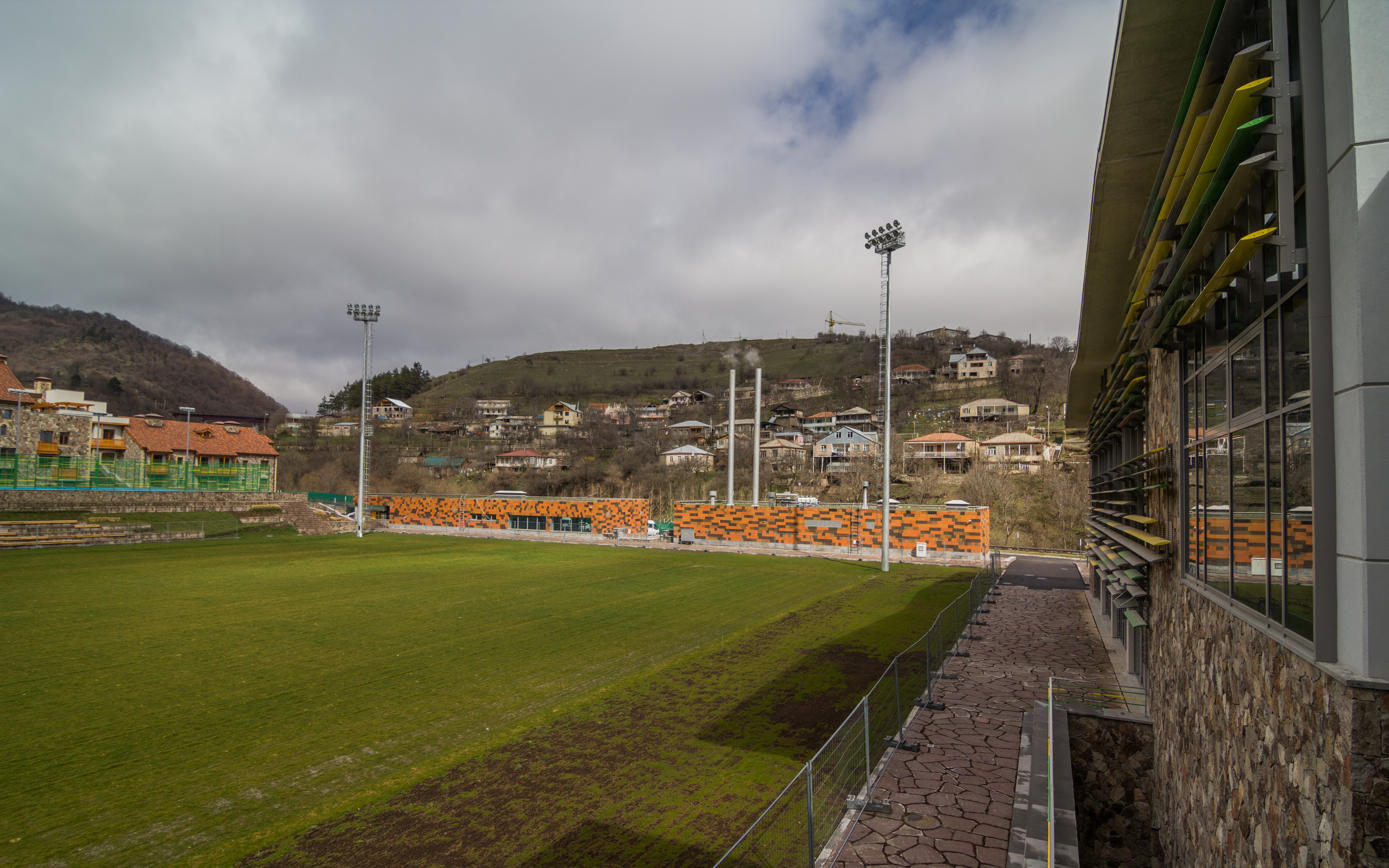
Playing field and part of a village in the background

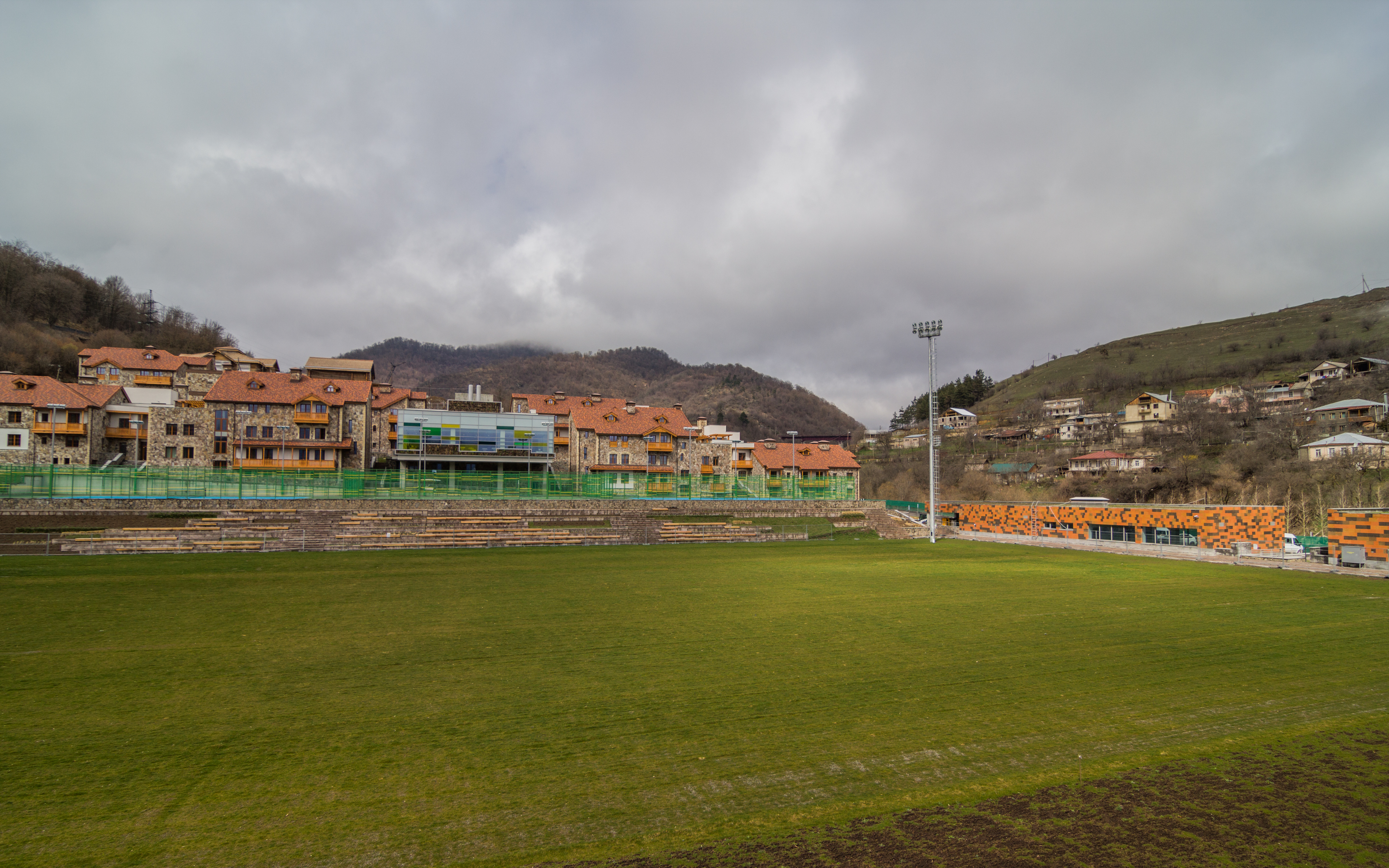
Playing field and lodging area

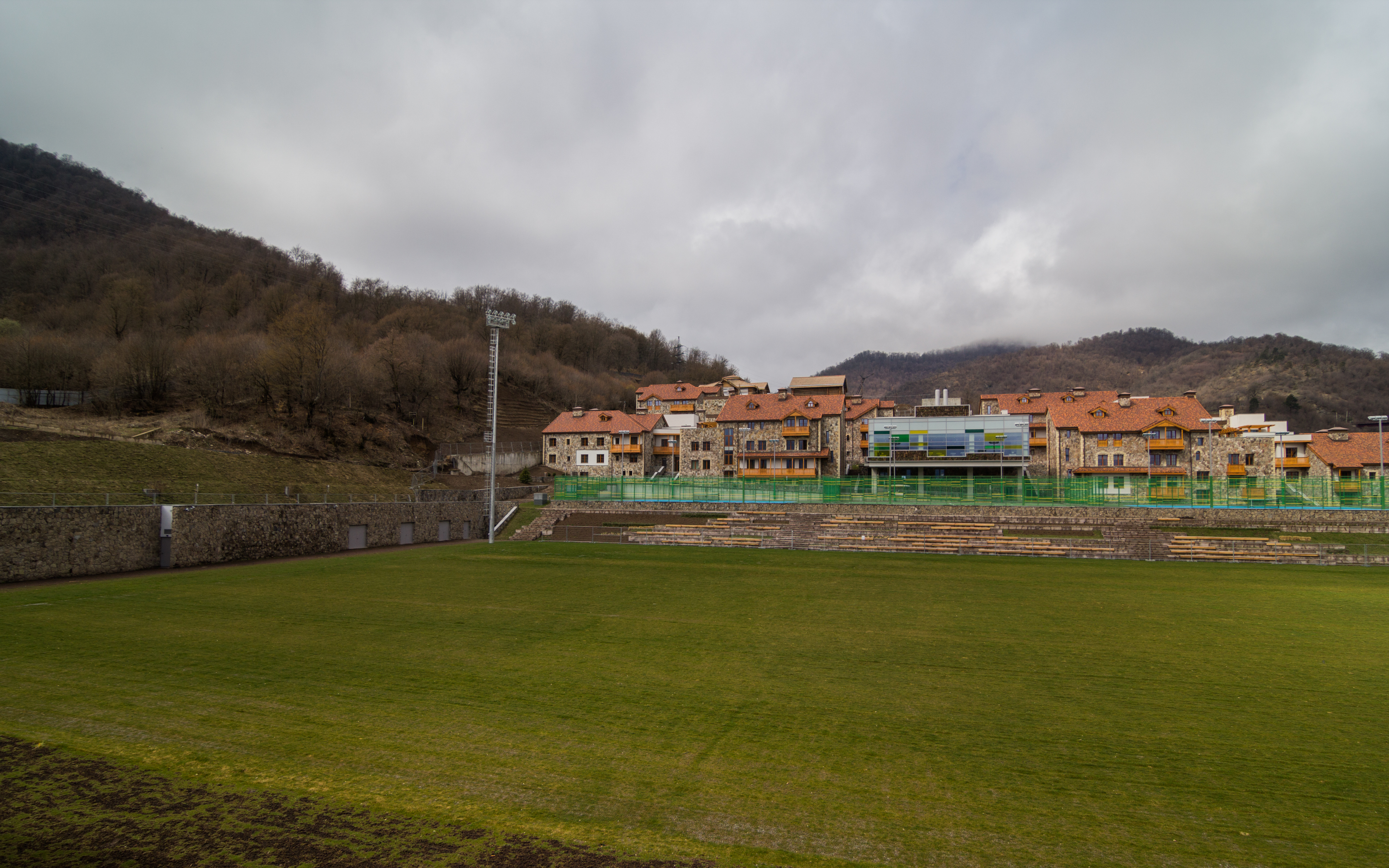
Playing field and lodging area

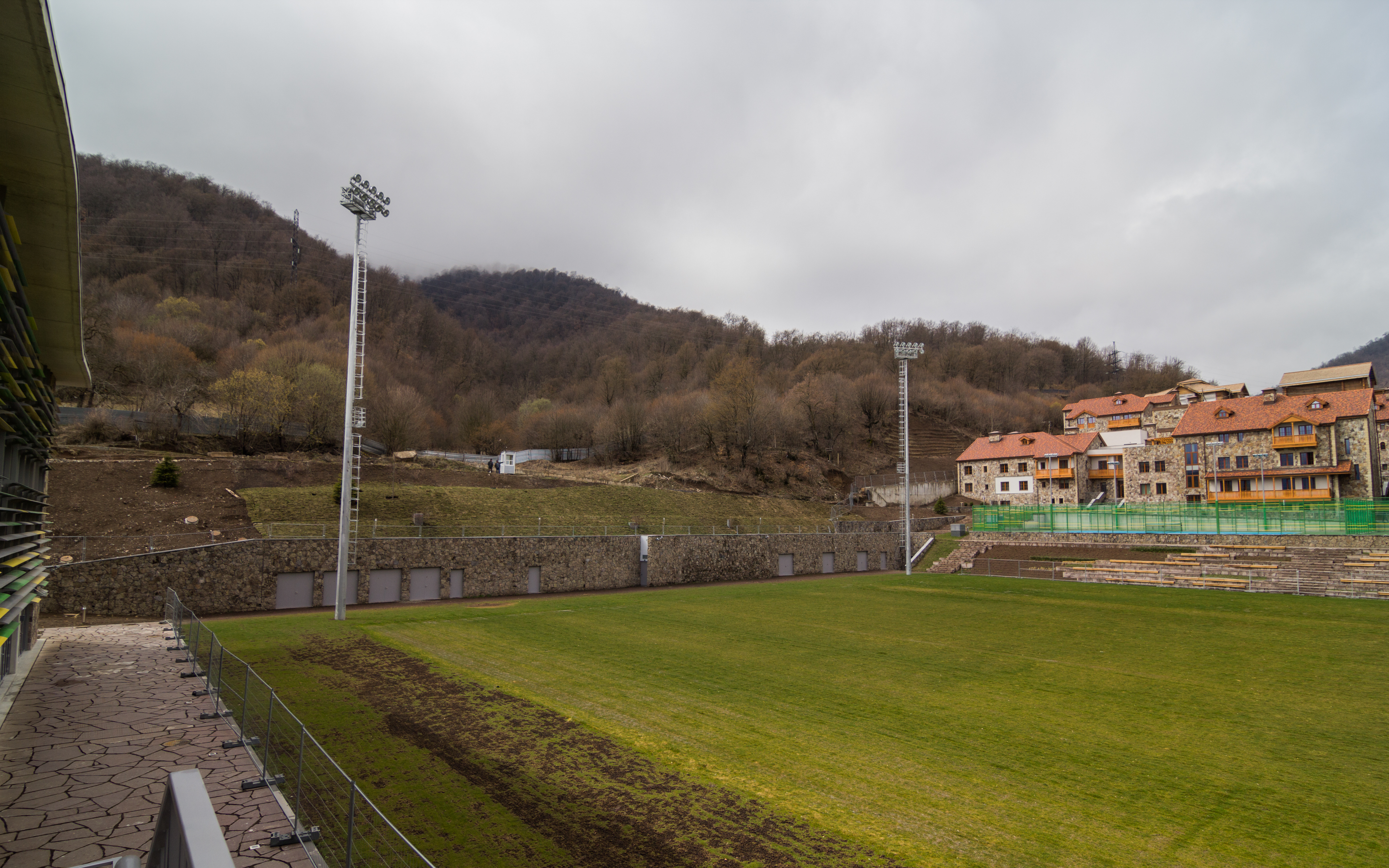
Playing field and lodging area

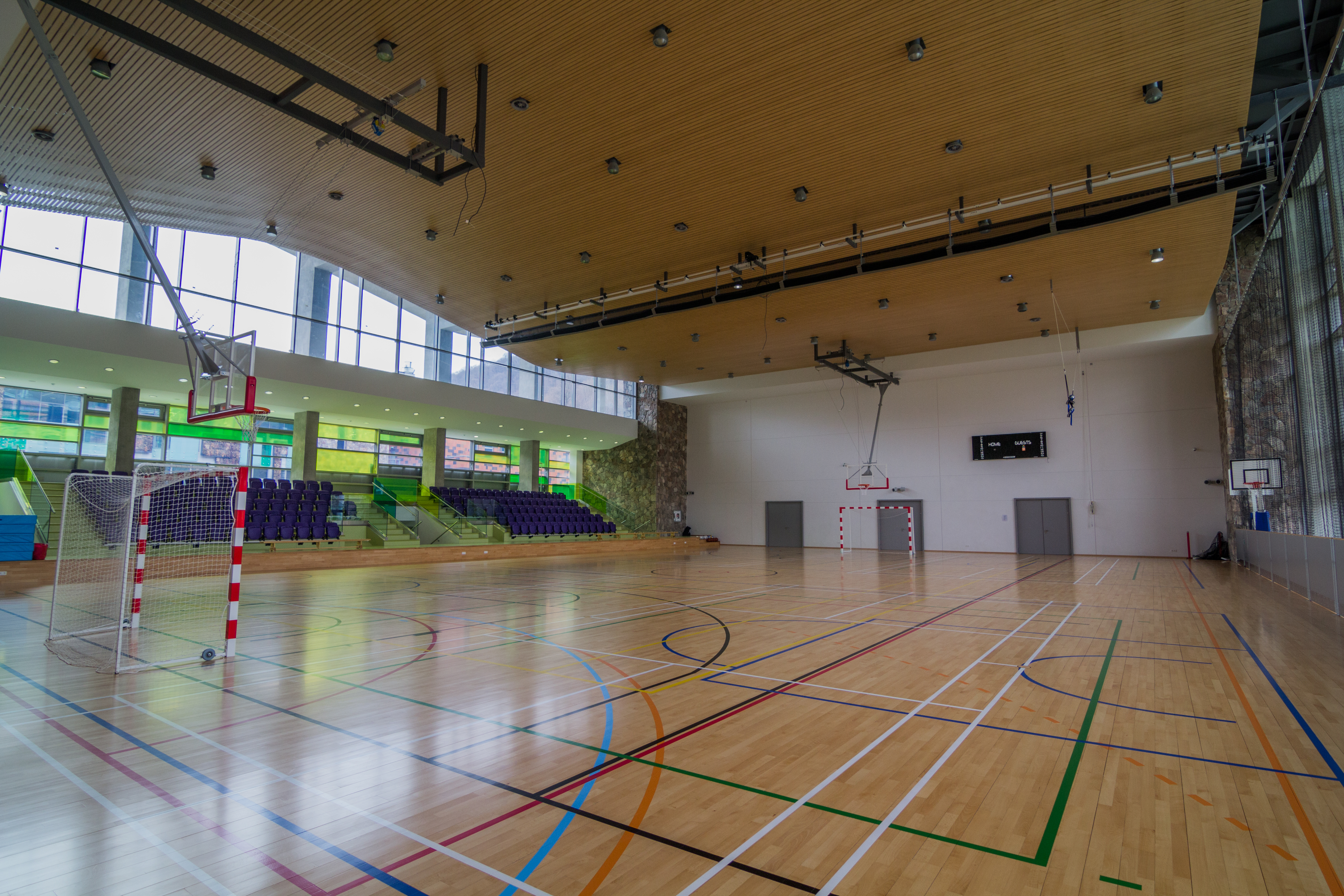
Indoor playing court

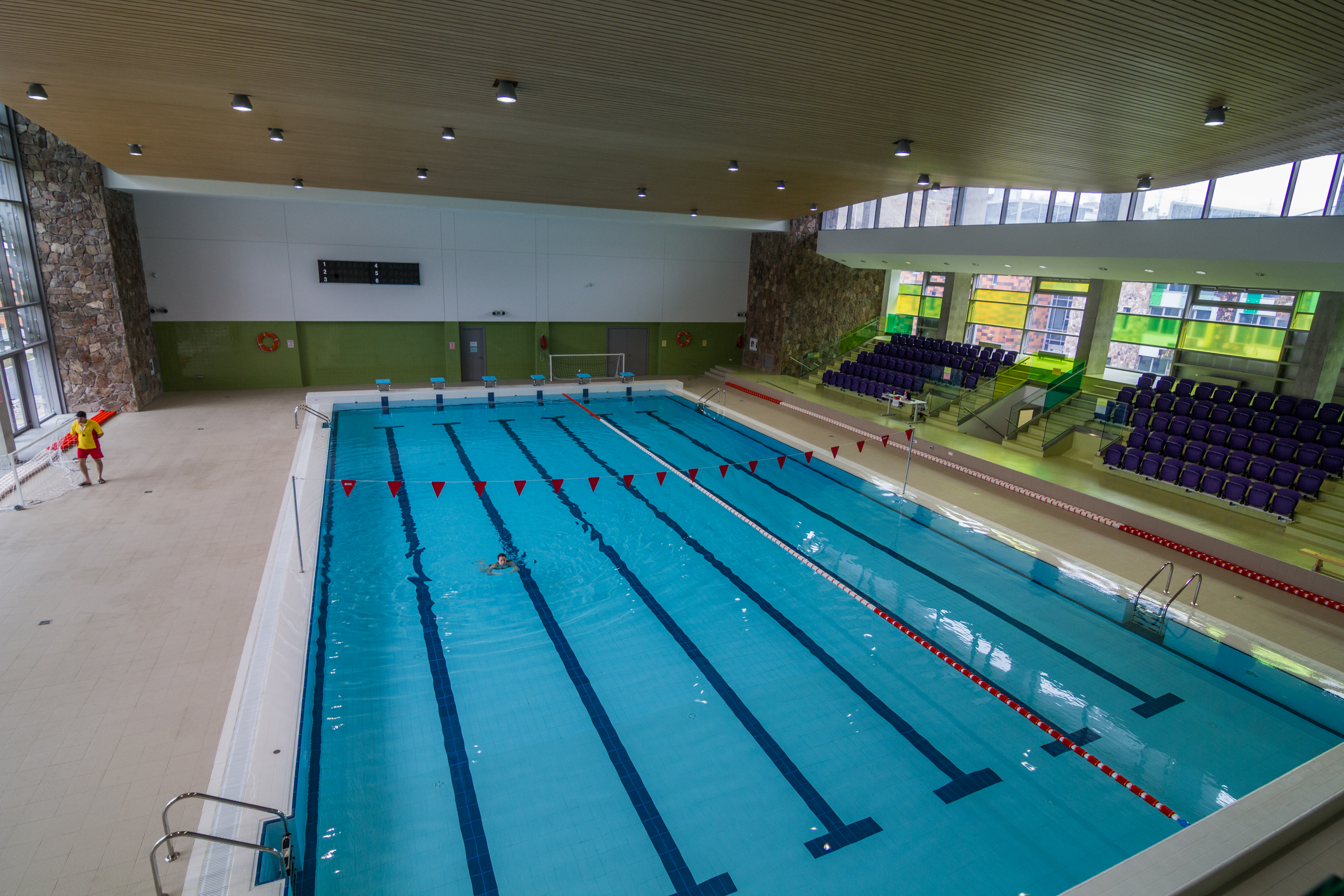
Indoor swimming pool

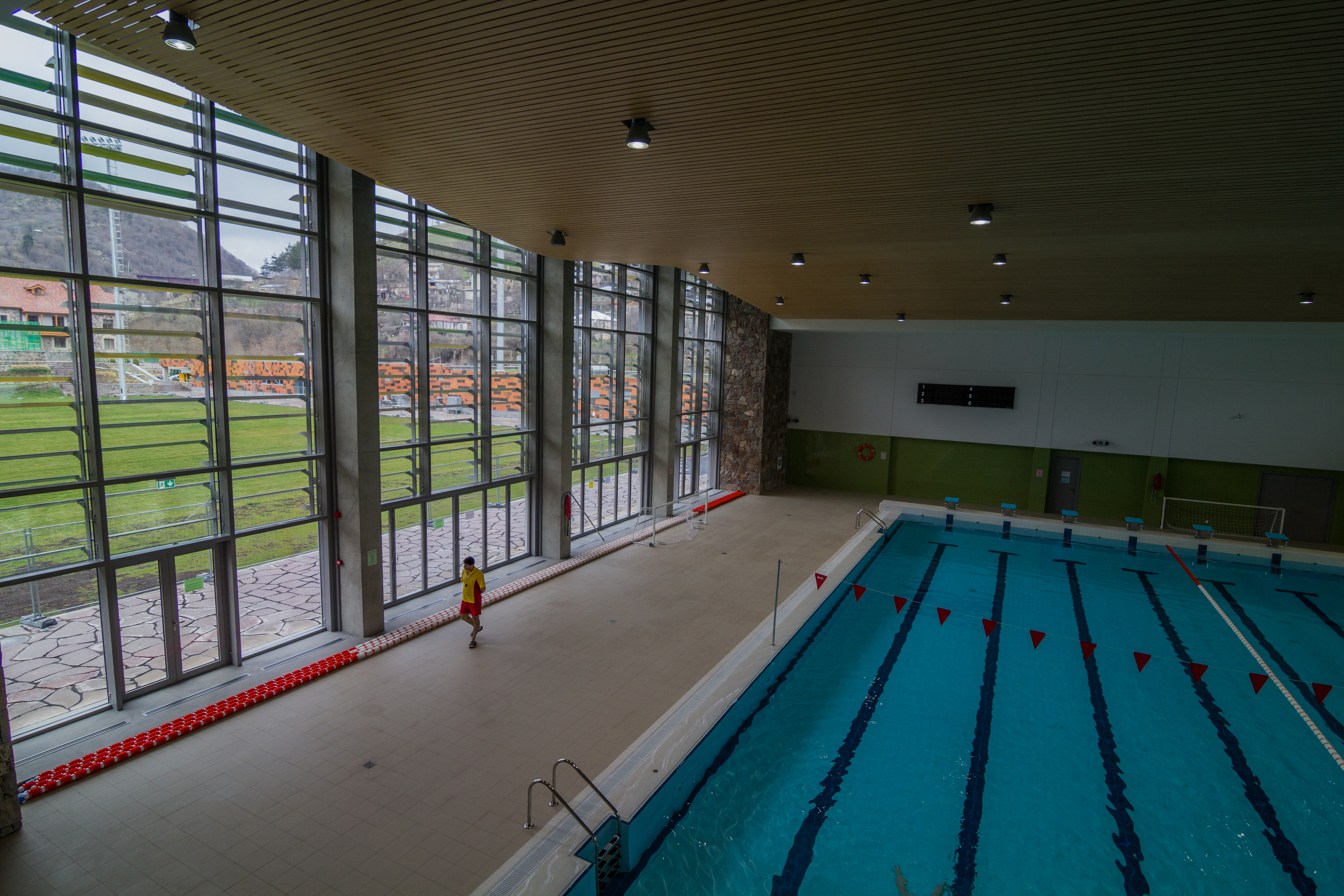
Indoor pool with outdoor playing field

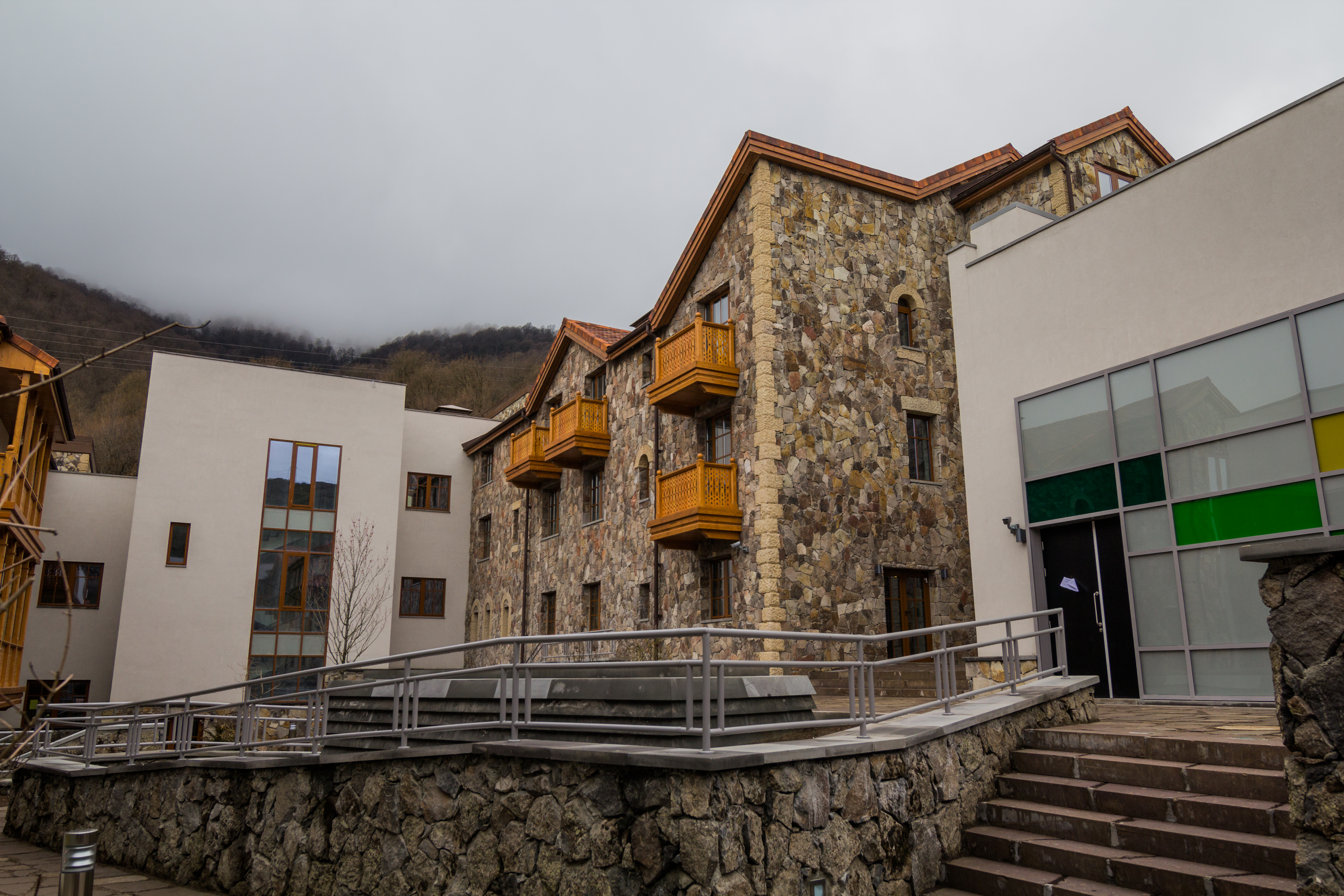
Residential area

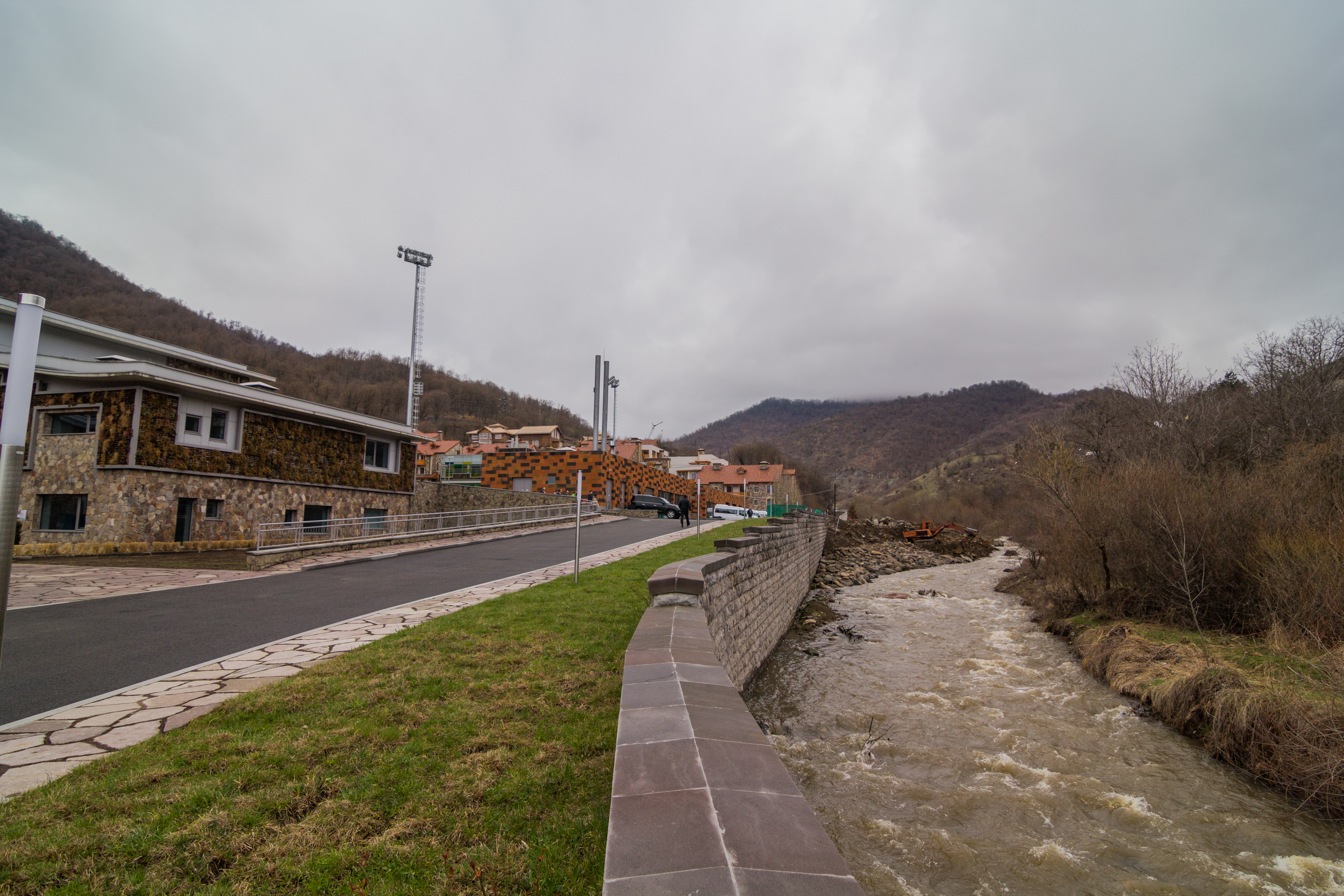
The campus is situated along a flowing river

== See also ==
- United World Colleges
- Tumo Center for Creative Technologies
- Ayb School
