= Vardges Ulubabyan =

Nagorno-Karabakh politician

- Occupation: legislator

Vardges Ulubabyan is a Deputy to Nagorno-Karabakh legislature. He is also the director of the Nagorno-Karabakh State Archives. In September 2011 he led a diplomatic mission to Transnistria.
