= Bagrat Ulubabyan =

Armenian writer and historian (1925-2001)

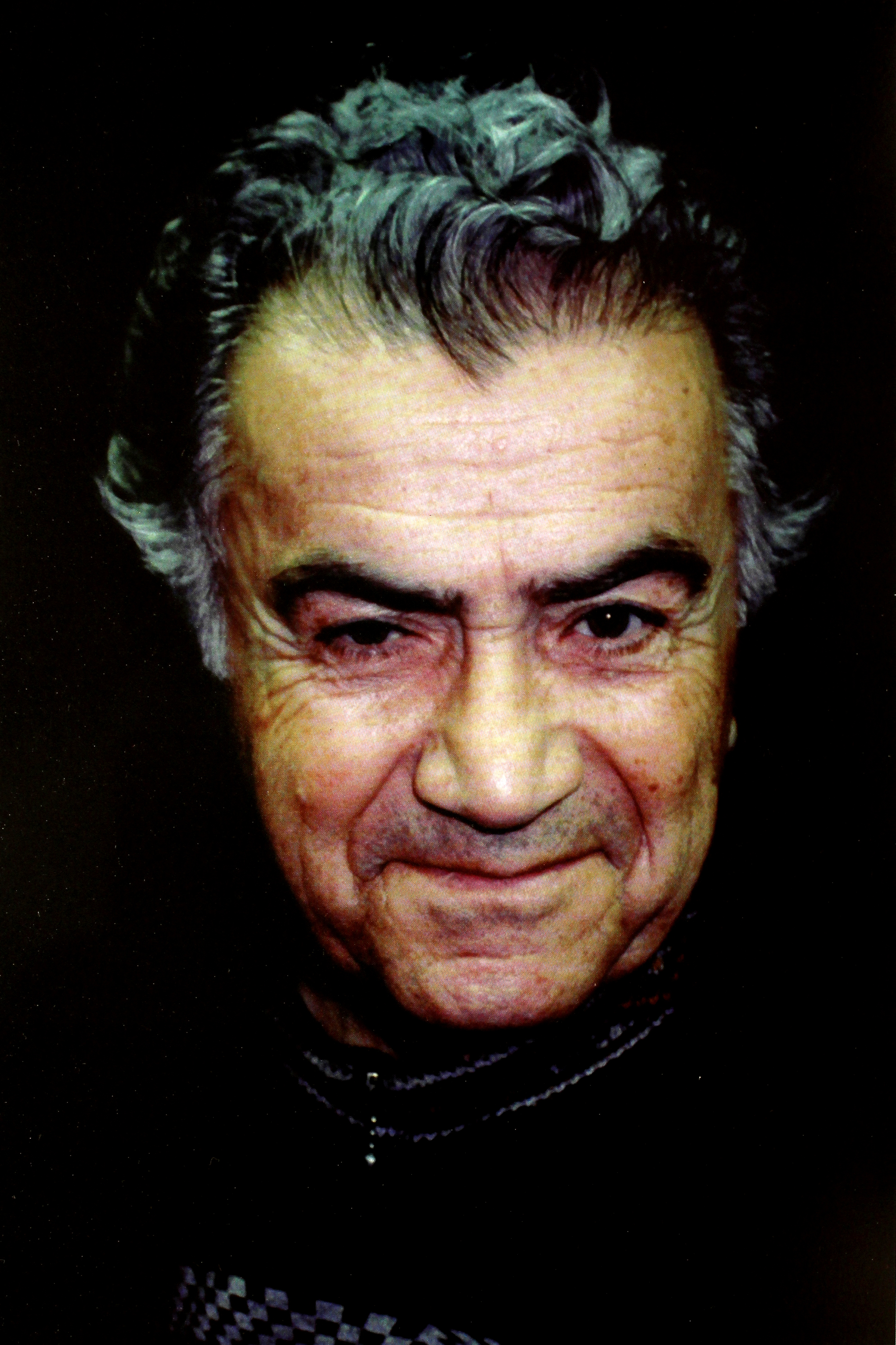
- Born: December 9, 1925; Mushkapat, Nagorno-Karabakh Autonomous Oblast, Azerbaijan SSR
- Died: November 19, 2001 (aged 75); Yeghvard, Armenia
- Education: Baku Pedagogical Institute
- Known for: -The Principality of Khachen: From the 10th to 16th centuries -Sardarapat -A History of Artsakh
- Scientific career
- Fields: Medieval Armenia, history of Artsakh, Armenian language, Armenian literature
- Workplaces: Armenian Academy of Sciences

Bagrat Arshaki Ulubabyan (Armenian: Բագրատ Արշակի Ուլուբաբյան; December 9, 1925 – November 19, 2001) was an Armenian writer and historian, known most prominently for his work on the histories of Nagorno-Karabakh and Artsakh.

== Biography ==
=== Early life and education ===
Ulubabyan was born in the village of Mushkapat in the Martuni region of the Nagorno-Karabakh Autonomous Oblast (NKAO), Azerbaijan SSR, on December 9, 1925. In 1944, he graduated from Shusha's Pedagogical Institute. Two years later, he received his degrees in Armenian language and Armenian literature from Baku's Pedagogical Institute. From 1949 until 1967, he returned to Nagorno-Karabakh and was the head of the province's Writers Union. During those years, he was also a writer for the Armenian language newspaper Sovetakan Gharabagh (Soviet Karabakh) and a deputy to the head of NKAO's executive committee. In 1968, Ulubabyan moved from the NKAO to Yerevan, the capital of the Armenian SSR, and in the following year, became a senior researcher in the history department at the Armenian Academy of Sciences.

=== Works ===
Ulubabyan's first works were in the field of poetry. In 1952 and 1956, he completed two works, "Songs about Work and Peace" and "This Morning". He, however, shifted his focus and began writing short stories as well as epics: "Aygestan" (1960), "Tartar" (1963), "The Grain Never Dies" (1967), and "Lamp" (1976). He also wrote two novels, Armenian Land in 1959 and The Man in 1963. One of his most prominent works was the historical novel Sardarapat.

Many of Ulubabyan's work concern the Armenians of Nagorno-Karabakh. In 1975, he published The Principality of Khachen, From the 10th to 16th centuries, a political and cultural history of the medieval principality of Khachen. In 1979, he published A Gold Chain, a collection of historical essays from the stories of Movses Kaghankatvatsi until the era of the principalities of Karabakh, depicting the role of Nagorno-Karabakh in the history of Armenia. Several years later, in 1981, he published Studies in the History of the Eastern Provinces of Armenia and Gandzasar. More recently, he authored A History of Artsakh: From the Beginning Until Our Days (1994). Another work on the region, The Survival Struggle of Artsakh, was published in the same year and was a study focusing on the Nagorno-Karabakh during the Soviet era (from 1918 until the 1960s). As an expert in Classical Armenian literature, he translated two works of the 5th-century Armenian chronicler Ghazar Parpetsi, A History of Armenia and A Letter to Vahan Mamikonian, into Armenian in 1982.

=== Later life ===
In the late 1980s, with the beginning of the Nagorno-Karabakh conflict, Ulubabyan took part in the demonstrations in Yerevan which called on Soviet authorities to turn Karabakh over to the control of Armenia. During the 1960s, Ulubabyan had also been the author and one of thirteen signatories of a letter sent to Moscow, asking that the Soviet Union to consider Karabakh's incorporation into Armenia.

On May 7, 2001, in honor of his work in regards to Armenian history, he was decorated with the Order of Saint Gregory the Illuminator by the Nagorno Karabakh Republic's then-president, Arkady Ghukasyan. After suffering from a long bout of lung disease, Ulubabyan died on November 19, 2001.

== Endorsement, recognition and criticism ==
In modern academic world Bagrat Ulubabyan is acknowledged as a respected scholar in the field of Caucasiology. Western scholars, such as Robert Hewsen or Patrick Donabedian, have extensively used Ulubabyan's research on eastern lands of Armenia, directly or indirectly endorsing his statements and views. In an essay on the kingdom of Artsakh, Hewsen also referred to Ulubabyan's Principality of Khachen as an "important work" and suggested it as a supplemental source to readers who are interested in learning more about the region and its medieval history.

However, Russian historian Victor Schnirelmann considers Ulubabyan as one of several scholars who tried to create an Armenian "myth" of the history of Nagorno-Karabakh. Schnirelmann criticized Ulubabyans contention that in the early Middle Ages the Caucasian Albanians populated only the lands to the north of the Kura River, and that despite the traditional point of view according to which the Udi people represent the descendants of medieval Albanian tribe of Utis, Ulubabyan claimed that the latter were not only Armenicized very early, but were almost originally Armenian.
