= Grigory Martirosyan =

Artsakhi politician

- Գրիգորի Մարտիրոսյան
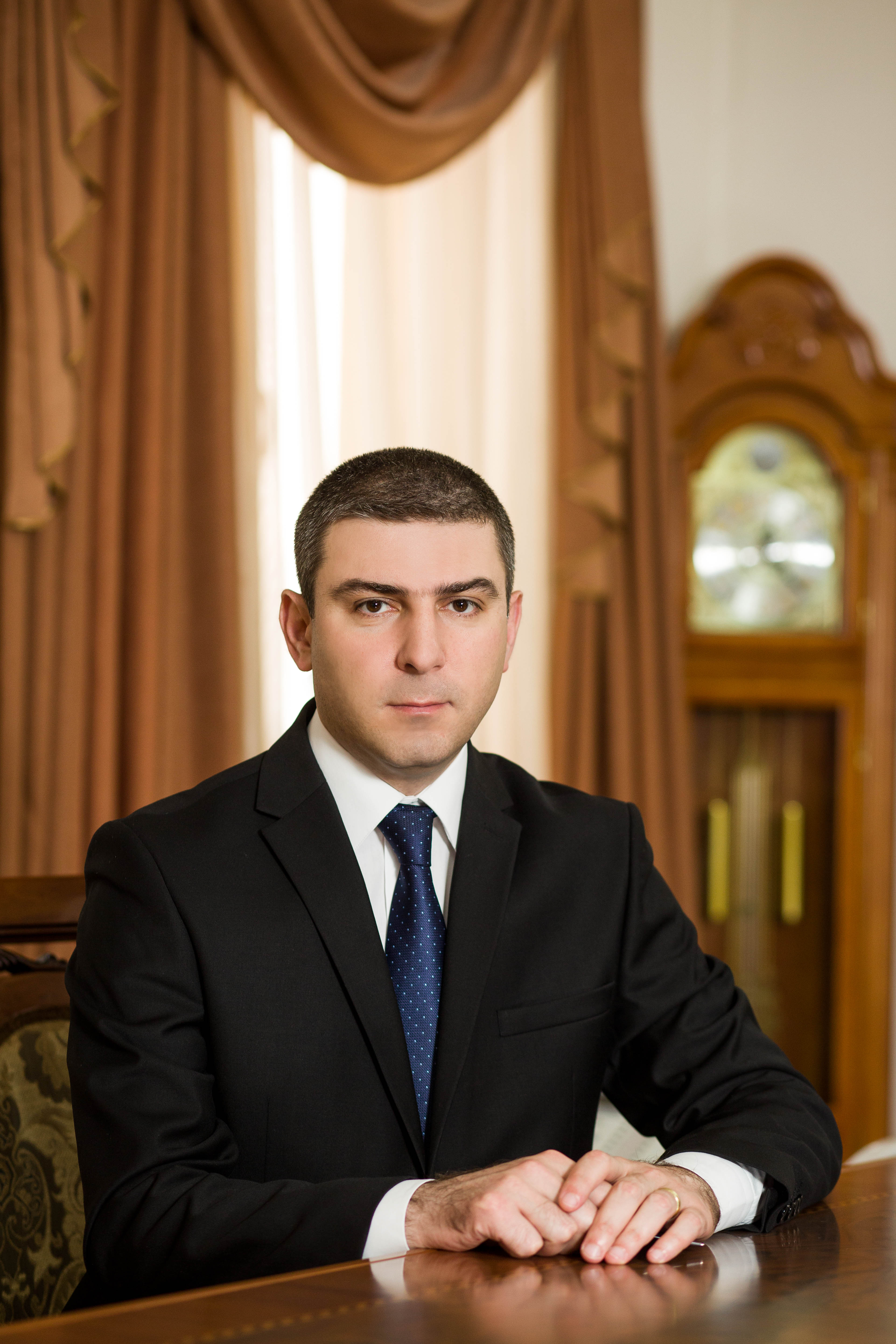
- Martirosyan in 2018

2nd State Minister of Artsakh
- In office 6 June 2018 – 1 June 2021
- President: Bako Sahakyan; Arayik Harutyunyan
- Preceded by: Arayik Harutyunyan
- Succeeded by: Artak Beglaryan

Personal details
- Born: 14 November 1978 (age 47) Stepanakert, Nagorno-Karabakh Autonomous Oblast, Soviet Union
- Children: 3
- Education: Artsakh State University; Yerevan State University

Grigory Martirosyan (Armenian: Գրիգորի Մարտիրոսյան, born 14 November 1978) is a politician who served as the State Minister of the de facto independent Republic of Artsakh from 2018 until 2021. He also previously served as Finance Minister from September 2017 until June 2018, when then State Minister, Arayik Harutyunyan, resigned and Martirosyan was appointed in his place.

== Biography ==
Martirosyan was born on November 14, 1978, in Stepanakert, the capital of the Republic of Artsakh. In 1999, he graduated from Artsakh State University with a B.A. in economics. In 2001 he graduated from Yerevan State University with an M.A. in economics. From 1998 to 1999 he was an economist in the State Department of Statistics. From 2000 to 2005 he was a specialist in the State Procurement Agency. From 2005 until 2007 he was the Chief Specialist in the Ministry of Finance and economy. In 2008 he was made Deputy Minister of Finance and in 2015 he was made First Deputy Minister of Finance. On September 25, 2017, he was appointed Minister of Finance by President Bako Sahakyan. On June 8, 2018, he was made Minister of State.
