= Politics of Artsakh =

Politics of the Republic of Artsakh, a largely unrecognised state in the south Caucasus

Political System of Artsakh Արցախի հանրապետության պետական համակարգ
- Coat of arms of Artsakh
- Polity type: Unitary presidential republic
- Constitution: Constitution of Artsakh
- Formation: December 10, 1991

Legislative branch
- Name: National Assembly
- Type: Unicameral
- Presiding officer: Ashot Ghulian, President of the National Assembly

Executive branch
- Head of state and government
- Title: President
- Currently: Arayik Harutyunyan
- Cabinet
- Current cabinet: Second Harutyunyan government
- Ministries: 15

Politics of Artsakh took place within the constraints of a written constitution, approved by a popular vote, that recognises three branches of government: executive, legislative and judicial. The executive branch of government was exercised within a framework of a presidential representative democratic republic, whereby the President of Artsakh was both the head of state and the head of government. The legislative branch of government was composed of both the Government and the National Assembly. Elections to the National Assembly were on the basis of a multi-party system. As of 2009, the American-based non-governmental organisation, Freedom House, ranks Artsakh above both Armenia and Azerbaijan in terms of political and civil rights. The republic was de facto independent and de jure a part of Azerbaijan. None of the elections in Artsakh were recognised by international bodies such as the OSCE Minsk Group, the European Union or the Organisation of Islamic Cooperation. Both Azerbaijan and Turkey had condemned the elections and called them a source of increased tensions.

Following the Azerbaijani offensive on 19 September 2023, Artsakh agreed to dissolve itself by 1 January 2024, however instead of dissolving, they established a government-in-exile in Yerevan, Armenia. The Prime Minister of Armenia, Nikol Pashinyan, has since severely opposed the government-in-exile's existence in Armenia.

== Executive branch ==
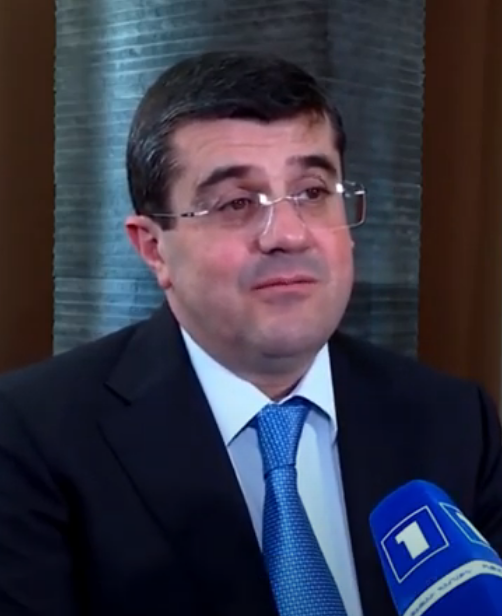
Arayik Harutyunyan 4th President of the Republic

Main office-holders
Office	Name	Party	Since
President	Arayik Harutyunyan	Free Motherland	21 May 2020

The President was directly elected for a five-year term, by popular vote.

=== Current government ===
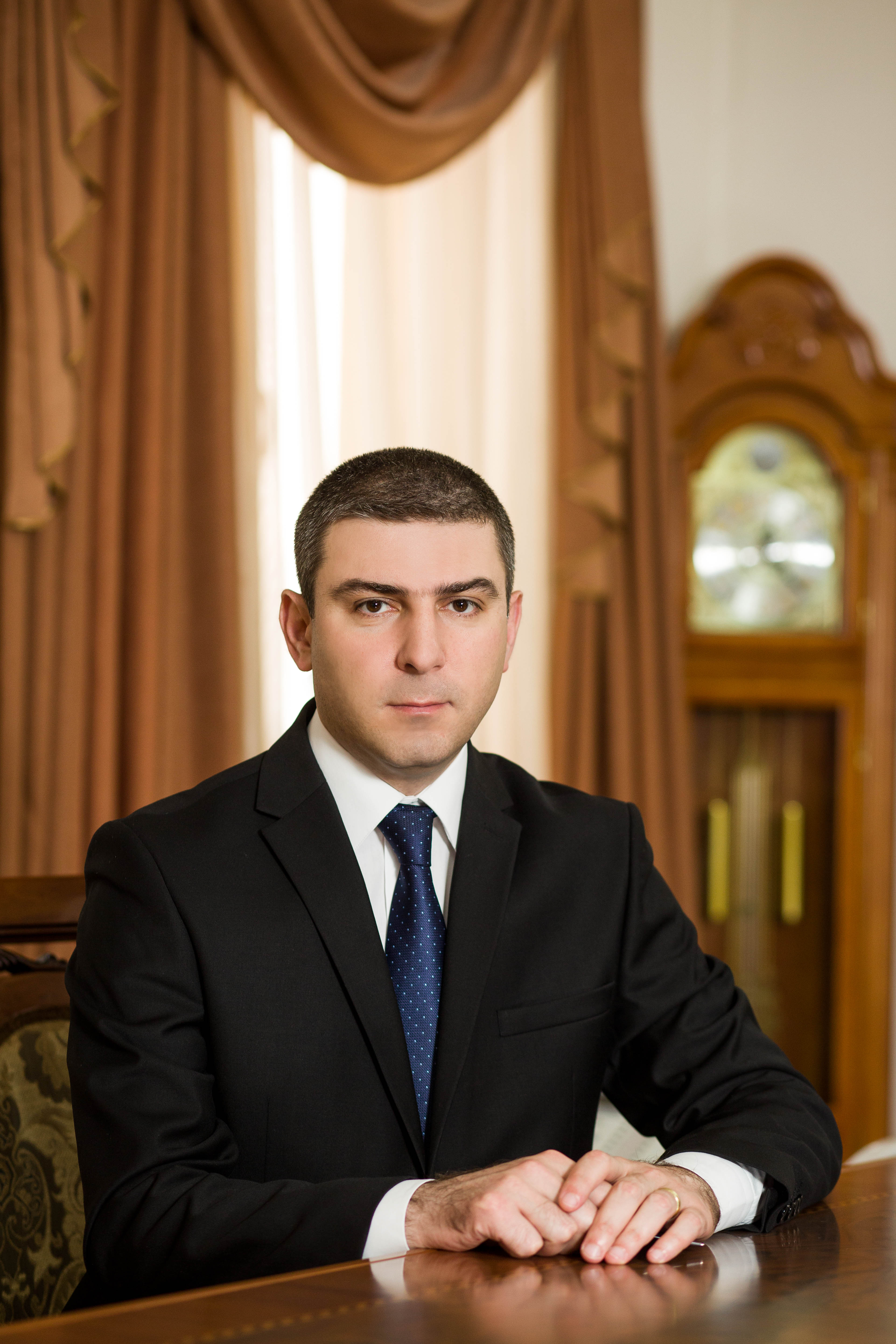
Grigori Martirosyan State Minister of the Republic

== Legislative branch ==
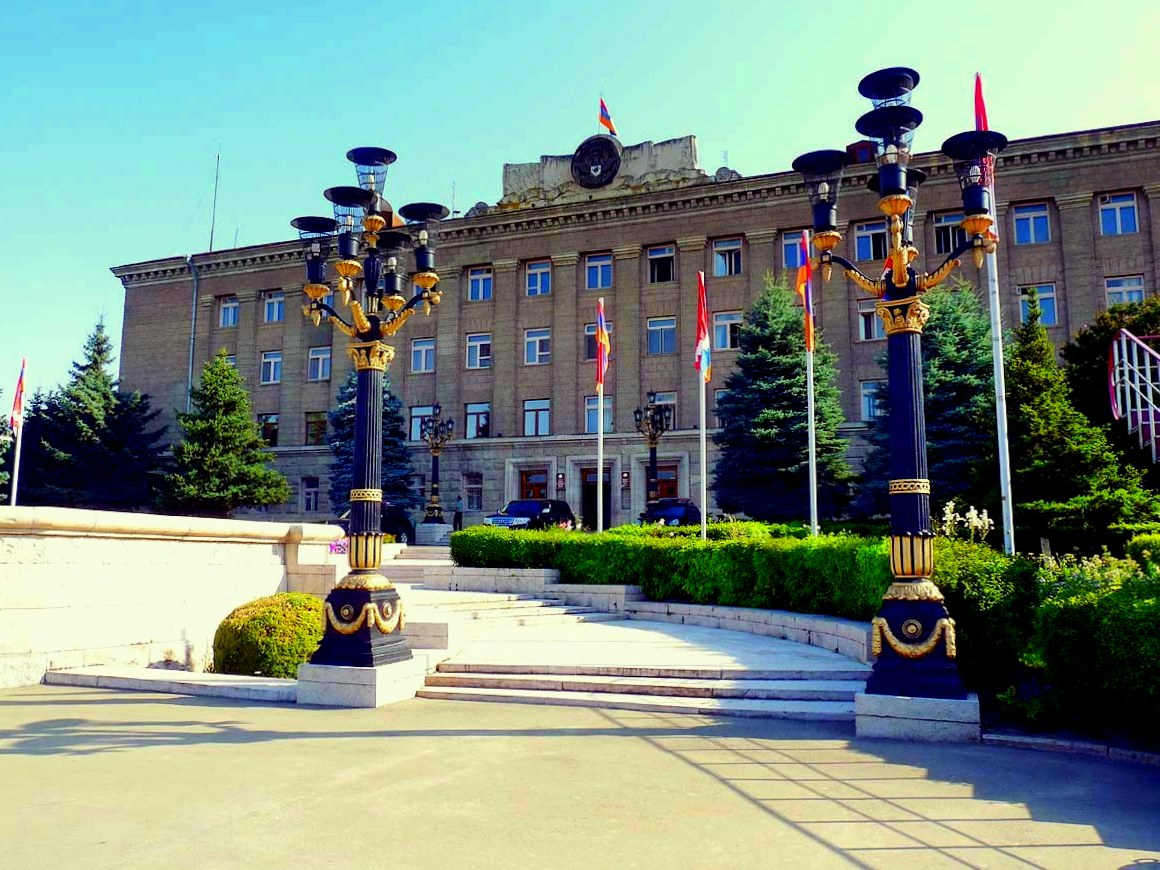
Artsakh Presidential Palace

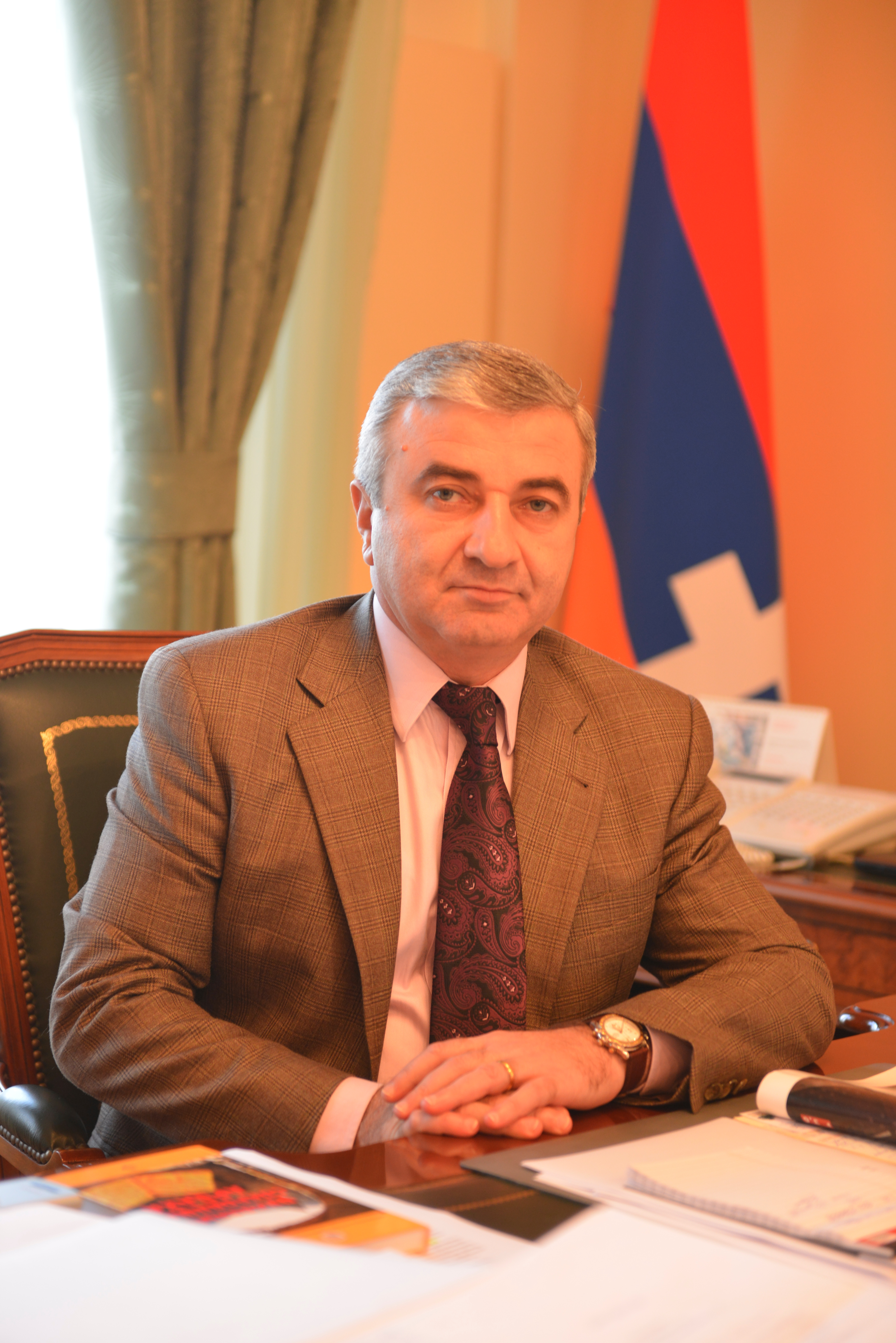
Ashot Ghulian Speaker of the National Assembly

The National Assembly (Azgayin Zhoghov) had 33 members who were elected for a five-year term by Party-list proportional representation. Artsakh had a multi-party system, with numerous political parties in which no one party often had a chance of gaining power alone, and parties had to work with each other to form coalition governments.

== Judicial branch ==
Narine Narimanyan was the last Head of the Supreme Court of the Republic of Artsakh.

== Latest elections ==
=== Presidential election ===
Candidate	Party	First round		Second round	
Candidate	Party	Votes	%	Votes	%
Arayik Harutyunyan	Free Motherland - UCA Alliance	36,076	49.17	39,860	88.01
Masis Mayilyan	Independent	19,360	26.39	5,428	11.99
Vitaly Balasanyan	Justice	10,855	14.79		
David Ishkhanyan	Armenian Revolutionary Federation	1,873	2.55		
Ashot Ghulian	Democratic Party of Artsakh	1,683	2.29		
Hayk Khanumyan	National Revival	962	1.31		
Vahan Badasyan	United Armenia Party	743	1.01		
David Babayan	Artsakh Conservative Party	587	0.80		
Ruslan Israelyan	Generation of Independence Party	371	0.51		
Christine Balayan	Independent	202	0.28		
Ashot Dadayan	Independent	198	0.27		
Bella Lalayan	Independent	162	0.22		
Sergey Amiryan	Independent	160	0.22		
Melsik Poghosyan	Independent	141	0.19		
Total		73,373	100.00	45,288	100.00
Valid votes		73,373	96.55	45,288	96.02
Invalid/blank votes		2,622	3.45	1,876	3.98
Total votes		75,995	100.00	47,164	100.00
Registered voters/turnout		104,866	72.47	104,777	45.01
Source: CEC, CEC

=== Parliamentary election ===
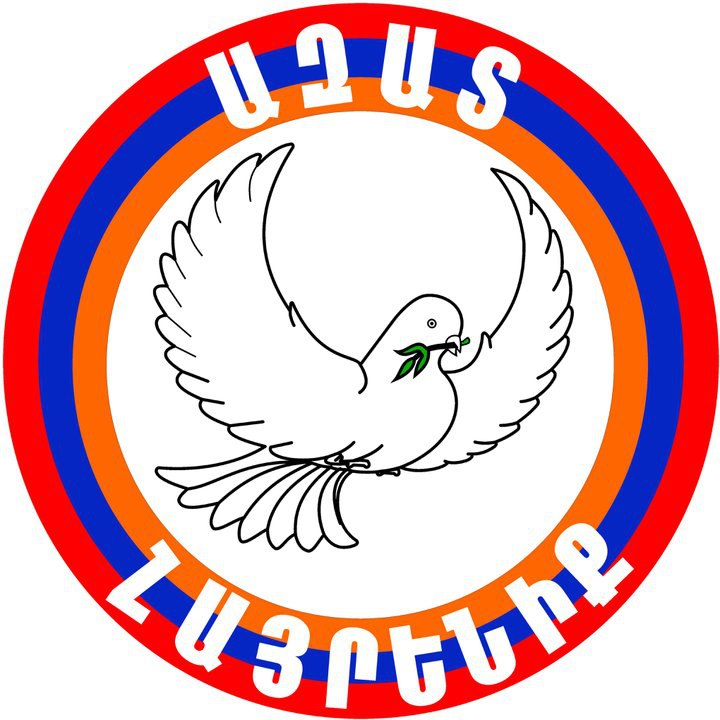
Logo of the Free Motherland party

Party	Votes	%	Seats	+/–
Free Motherland - UCA Alliance	30,015	40.80	16	+1
United Motherland	17,683	24.04	9	New
Justice	5,867	7.98	3	New
Armenian Revolutionary Federation	4,758	6.47	3	–4
Democratic Party of Artsakh	4,314	5.86	2	–4
New Artsakh Alliance	3,385	4.60	0	New
National Revival	2,175	2.96	0	0
Artsakh Conservative Party	2,156	2.93	0	New
Artsakh Revolutionary Party	1,325	1.80	0	New
United Armenia Party	930	1.26	0	New
Generation of Independence Party	551	0.75	0	New
Communist Party of Artsakh	402	0.55	0	0
Total	73,561	100.00	33	0
Valid votes	73,561	96.82		
Invalid/blank votes	2,419	3.18		
Total votes	75,980	100.00		
Registered voters/turnout	104,866	72.45		
Source: CEC, Armenanews

== Political parties ==
Below is a list of former political parties in Artsakh. The region had a multi-party system with numerous political parties, in which no one party often has a chance of gaining power alone, and parties must work with each other to form coalition governments. The following parties won seats in the National Assembly following the 31 March 2020 Artsakhian general election (total 33 seats):

Name	Abbr.	Alliance	MPs (2020-)
Free Motherland; Ազատ Հայրենիք Կուսակցություն; Azat Hayrenik Kusaktsutyun	FMP; ԱՀԿ	Free Motherland - UCA Alliance; Ազատ Հայրենիք - ՔՄԴ դաշինք Azat Hayrenik - KMD Dashink	16 / 33
United Civic Alliance Party; Քաղաքացիական Միացյալ Դաշինք Կուսակցություն; Kaghakaciakan Miacyal Dashink Kusaktsutyun	UCA; ՔՄԴ	Free Motherland - UCA Alliance; Ազատ Հայրենիք - ՔՄԴ դաշինք Azat Hayrenik - KMD Dashink	16 / 33
United Motherland; Միասնական Հայրենիք Կուսակցություն; Miasnakan Hayrenik Kusaktsutyun	UMP; ՄՀԿ	none	9 / 33
Artsakh Justice Party; Արցախի Արդարություն Կուսակցություն; Artsakhi Ardarutyun Kusaktsutyun	JPA; ԱԱԿ	none	3 / 33
Armenian Revolutionary Federation; Հայ Հեղափոխական Դաշնակցություն; Hay Heghapokhakan Dashnaktsutyun	ARF; ՀՅԴ	none	3 / 33
Democratic Party of Artsakh; Արցախի ժողովրդավարական կուսակցություն Artsakhi Joghovrdavarakan Kusaktsutyun	DPA; ԱԺԿ	none	2 / 33

The extra-parliamentary political parties which had no seats in the National Assembly, are listed below:

- Armenia Our Home (Mer Tun’ Hayastan)
- Artsakh Conservative Party
- Artsakh Freedom Party
- Artsakh Republican Party
- Artsakh Revolutionary Party
- Communist Party of Artsakh (Artsaki Komunistakan Kusaktsutyun)
- Generation of Independence Party
- Identity and Unity Party
- Moral Revival (Baroyakan Veratsnund)
- Movement 88 (Sharzhum 88)
- National Revival (Azgayin Veratsnund)
- New Artsakh Alliance
- Peace and Development Party (Khaghaghutyun yev Zargatsum Kusaktsutsyun)
- Powerful United Homeland Party
- Social Justice Party (Sotsialakan Ardarutyun Kusaktsutyun)
- United Armenia Party

== See also ==
- Electoral calendar
- Electoral system
- Elections in Artsakh
- Foreign relations of Artsakh
- List of political parties in Artsakh
- List of political parties in Armenia
- List of political parties by country
- Armenakan Party (Nagorno-Karabakh)
- National Assembly (Artsakh)
- Politics of Armenia
