= 2023 Artsakhian presidential election =

- 9 September 2023

Two-thirds of votes from the 33 National Assembly members required
Nominee	Samvel Shahramanyan
Party	Independent
Electoral vote	22
Percentage	95.65%
President before election
Davit Ishkhanyan (acting)
ARF
Elected President
Samvel Shahramanyan
Independent

Snap indirect presidential elections were held on 9 September 2023, in the unrecognized Republic of Artsakh. The President of the National Assembly of Artsakh acted as president until the election. The sole candidate, Samvel Shahramanyan, was elected in a 22–1 vote out of 23 deputies present. Several countries and supranational organizations, including the Council of Europe and the European Union, declared the elections as unlawful.

== Background ==
Facing protests, President of Artsakh Arayik Harutyunyan stated on 29 August 2023 that he was considering resigning and going to serve in Artsakh's militia. On 31 August, Harutyunyan announced his resignation as president of the Republic of Artsakh along with State Minister Gurgen Nersisyan. Before his resignation, Arayik Harutyunyan, by his last decree, appointed the Secretary of the Security Council Samvel Shahramanyan as a State Minister, giving him broad powers. He formally submitted his resignation to Artsakh's parliament on 1 September.

== Candidates ==
The deadline for nominating a candidate for the post of President of the Republic of Artsakh is 7 September 2023.

On 6 September 2023, it became known that three opposition parliamentary factions (Justice, Armenian Revolutionary Federation and Democratic Party of Artsakh) nominated State Minister Samvel Shahramanyan as a presidential candidate. Later Shahramanyan's candidacy was supported by the largest faction of the Parliament, Free Motherland-UCA.

The United Motherland leader Samvel Babayan said that he would take part in the meeting of the National Assembly on the agenda of the presidential elections, but would not vote for the candidate. They plan to hold a demonstration in the capital Stepanakert on the day of the presidential elections. Later, the United Motherland faction nominated its leader Samvel Babayan, but his candidacy was rejected due to the fact that he did not present a certificate of Artsakh citizenship and that he had been permanently residing in the country for the past ten years.

=== Samvel Shahramanyan ===
Samvel Shahramanyan, according to various sources, is a close associate of former Artsakh President Bako Sahakyan. When the latter was president, Shahramanyan was the director of the Artsakh National Security Service.

== Results ==
Candidate	Party	Votes	%
Samvel Shahramanyan	Independent (Note: Nominated by Free Motherland - UCA Alliance, Justice, Armenian Revolutionary Federation and Democratic Party of Artsakh factions)	22	95.65
Against		1	4.35
Total		23	100.00
Valid votes		23	100.00
Invalid/blank votes		0	0.00
Total votes		23	100.00
Registered voters/turnout		33	69.70
Source: National Assembly

== International reactions ==
=== Supranational organizations ===
- Council of Europe: The Secretary General of the Council of Europe Marija Pejčinović Burić made a post on Twitter referred to the "so-called 'presidential elections' in Khankendi/Stepanakert" as having "no legal ground". She further emphasized that the "humanitarian situation in the region & respect for international standards is key."
- European Union: The spokesperson for the European Union, Nabila Massrali, issued a statement stating that the European Union "does not recognise the constitutional and legal framework" within which the "so-called 'presidential elections'" took place in Karabakh. The EU also thinks it's crucial for the Armenians of Karabakh to unite behind a de facto leadership that is prepared and eager to engage in result-oriented talks with Baku. The EU has made a commitment to help this process.
- Organisation of Islamic Cooperation: The General Secretariat of the Organisation of Islamic Cooperation (OIC) released a statement denouncing the elections as a "flagrant violation of international law". The statement further clarified that the OIC "does not recognize these illegitimate elections, which constitute a violation of Azerbaijan's sovereignty and territorial integrity". The OIC also urged the "UN and international community not to recognize these elections".
- Organization of Turkic States: The secretary general of the Organization of Turkic States expressed his "deep concern" relating to "so-called presidential elections organized on 9 September 2023 by the illegal regime created by Armenia in the Karabakh region of the Republic of Azerbaijan."
- United Nations: Spokesperson of the Secretary-General, Stéphane Dujarric, answered the question about UN's position on this election by saying "we would like to recall Security Council resolution affirming the sovereignty and territorial integrity of Azerbaijan"

=== Countries ===
- Azerbaijan: The Azerbaijani Foreign Ministry called the elections "a gross violation of the Constitution, laws of the Republic of Azerbaijan, as well as the norms and principles of international law".
- Bulgaria: During the meeting with the Head of the National Assembly of Azerbaijan Sahiba Gafarova, Chairperson of the National Assembly of Bulgaria Rosen Zhelyazkov stated that they are concerned about "presidential elections" in Karabakh. This "election" contradicts with the statement of Armenian leadership about supporting territorial integrity of Azerbaijan.
- Georgia: The Georgian Foreign Ministry issued a statement expressing "its support for sovereignty and territorial integrity of the Republic of Azerbaijan" and added that it "doesn't recognize so called Presidential elections in Karabakh".
- Germany: The Foreign Ministry of Germany noted in the statement that it does not recognize the independence of Karabakh and the elections. They also added that Germany recognizes the territorial integrity of both countries within internationally recognized borders.
- Hungary: The Foreign Affairs Spokesperson of the Ministry of Foreign Affairs and Trade of Hungary, Máté Paczolay said that "Hungary stands up for the respect of the territorial integrity of Azerbaijan, therefore we consider the so-called "Presidential elections in Nagorno-Karabakh" illegitimate and urge for a peaceful settlement of the conflict as soon as possible."
- Kazakhstan: The Ministry of Foreign Affairs of the Republic of Kazakhstan has made an official statement on the situation in Nagorno-Karabakh: "In connection with the latest events around Nagorno-Karabakh, the Republic of Kazakhstan confirms again its strong support of sovereignty and territorial integrity of the Republic of Azerbaijan within its internationally recognized borders and stands for regulation of all issues by political and diplomatic means, in accordance with the UN Charter and fundamental principles and norms of the international law."
- Kyrgyzstan: On 12 September 2023, Foreign Ministry of Kyrgyzstan made a statement that saying concerning events took place in Karabakh. "The Kyrgyz Republic once again expresses support for the sovereignty and territorial integrity of the Republic of Azerbaijan" added MFA.
- Moldova: The Moldovan Foreign Ministry released a statement in which they stated that they "do not recognize the so-called 'presidential elections,' held in the Nagorno-Karabakh region" and that "the elections run counter the fundamental norms and principles of the international law."
- Pakistan: The Pakistani Foreign Ministry issued a statement labeling the elections held by "the illegally installed regime" as "legally and morally reprehensible" and a "grave violation of the UN Charter and principles of established international law."
- Romania: The Romania Ministry of Foreign Affairs has issued a statement in which it states that Romania "does not recognize the so-called "presidential elections" in the Karabakh region" and "reiterates its full support for the sovereignty and territorial integrity of Azerbaijan within its internationally recognized borders and advocates political settlement of all issues in the region, in accordance with the principles of international law."
- Turkey: The Turkish Foreign Ministry condemned the election and called it a "flagrant violation of international law" and a violation of "Azerbaijan's sovereignity [sic] and territorial integrity".
- Ukraine: The Ukrainian Ministry of Foreign Affairs released a statement denouncing "the holding of the so-called 'presidential elections' that took place on September 9 in the territory of Karabakh (Republic of Azerbaijan)." They added that the election "contradicts the norms and principles of international law, and their results are null and void."
- United States: The Spokesperson for the US State Department Matthew Miller said "as we have said in the past, we do not recognize Nagorno-Karabakh as an independent and sovereign state and therefore we do not recognize the results of those so-called presidential elections that were announced over the last few days" in his speech during a briefing on 11 September 2023.
- United Kingdom: The British ambassador to Azerbaijan made a post on Twitter in Azerbaijani, stating that the United Kingdom (UK) "does not recognize the so-called 'presidential elections' held in Karabakh". He further emphasized the UK's support for the "sovereignty and territorial integrity of Azerbaijan", underscoring the "importance of the principles and norms of international law".
- Uzbekistan: The Uzbekistan Ministry of Foreign Affairs has issued a statement in which it states that Uzbekistan "supports the sovereignty and territorial integrity of the friendly Republic of Azerbaijan", "condemns any interference in its internal affairs" and "does not recognize the so-called presidential elections".
