= Powerful United Homeland Party =

Powerful United Homeland Party Հզոր Միացյալ հայրենիքի կուսակցություն
- Leader: Vyacheslav Hyusnunts
- Headquarters: Stepanakert
- Ideology: Armenian nationalism United Armenia

The Powerful United Homeland Party (Armenian: Հզոր Միացյալ հայրենիքի կուսակցություն), also known as the Strong United Homeland Party, was an Armenian political party in Artsakh.

== History ==
The Powerful United Homeland Party's founder and current party leader is Vyacheslav Hyusnunts, a former military general and former member of the Communist Party of Artsakh. The party currently has no parliamentary representation within the National Assembly and acts as an extra-parliamentary force.

Prior to the 2020 Artsakhian general election, the party endorsed Masis Mayilyan and his New Artsakh Alliance.

== Ideology ==
The party considers the safety and security of the Artsakh Republic a top priority. The party supports future reunification of Artsakh with Armenia, fighting corruption, growing the economy, and modernizing the military. The party also advocates for establishing formal relations between Artsakh and the European Union and Commonwealth of Independent States.

== Activities ==
On 2 October 2019, the party met with representatives of the Artsakh's branch of the Armenian Revolutionary Federation, where political issues were discussed.

== See also ==
- List of political parties in Artsakh
- Politics of Artsakh
