= 2020 Artsakhian general election =

- Presidential election
- 31 March 2020 (first round); 14 April 2020 (second round)
- Turnout: 72.47% (first round); 45.01% (second round)
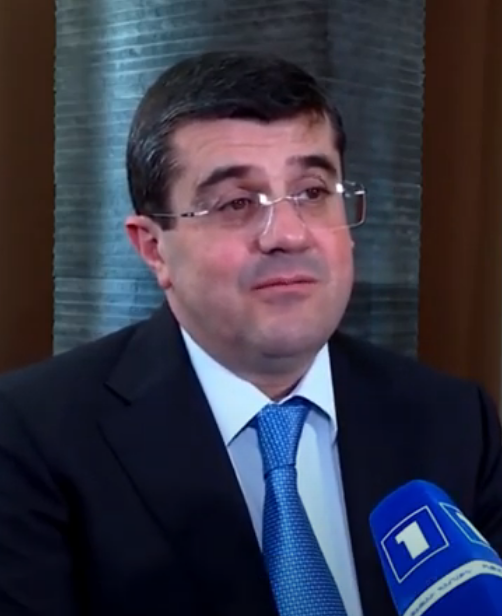

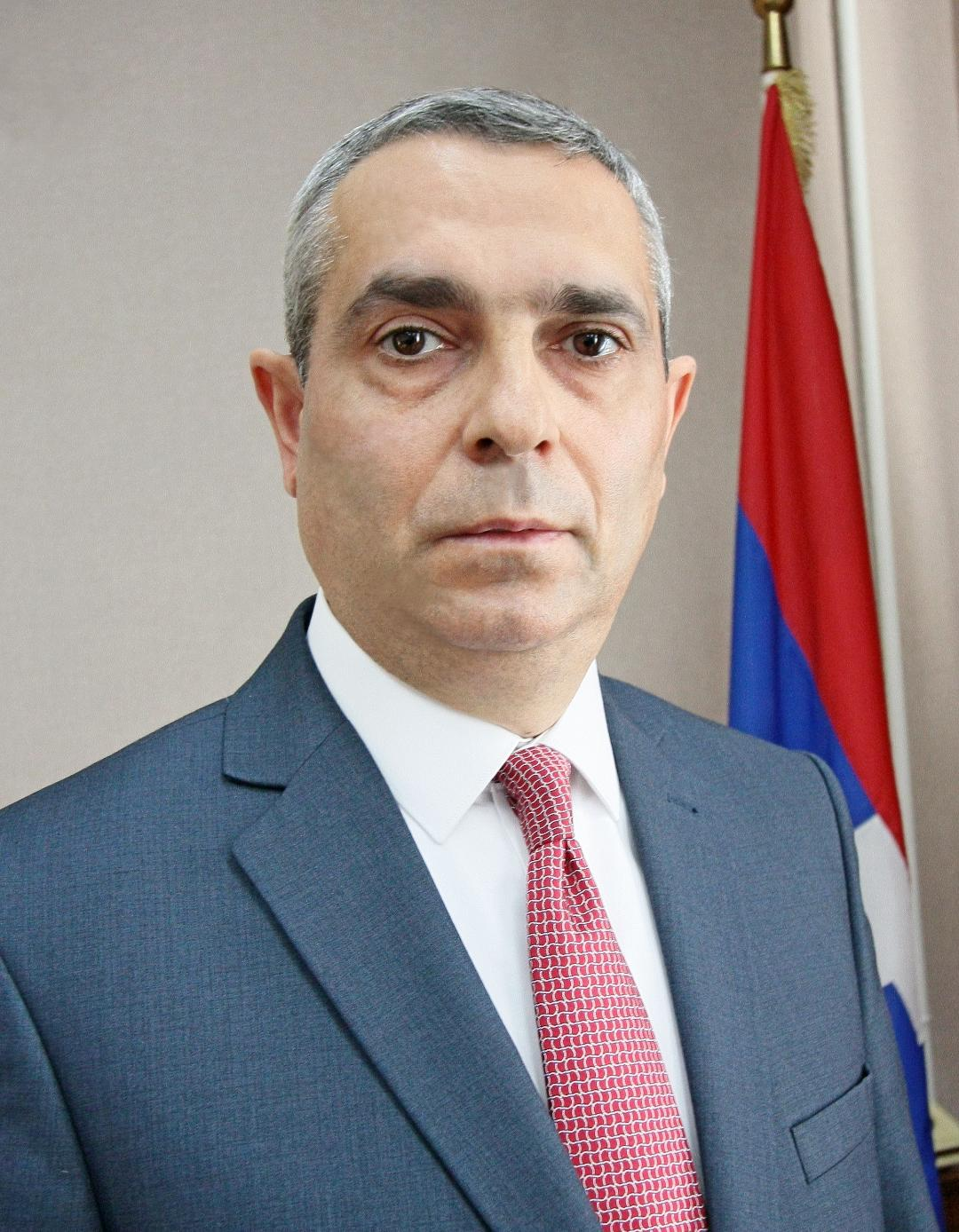
Candidate	Arayik Harutyunyan	Masis Mayilyan
Party	Free Motherland	Independent
Alliance	Free Motherland - UCA	New Artsakh Alliance
Popular vote	39,860	5,428
Percentage	88.01%	11.99%
- Second round results by province Harutyunyan: 80–90% >90%
President before election
Bako Sahakyan
Independent
President-elect
Arayik Harutyunyan
Free Motherland
- Parliamentary election
- 31 March 2020
- Turnout: 72.45%
Party	Leader	Vote %	Seats	+/–
Free Motherland - UCA	Arayik Harutyunyan	40.80	16	+1
United Motherland	Samvel Babayan	24.04	9	New
Justice	Vitaly Balasanyan	7.98	3	New
ARF	David Ishkhanyan	6.47	3	−4
Democratic Party	Ashot Ghulian	5.86	2	−4
This lists parties that won seats. See the complete results below.
President of the National Assembly before	President of the National Assembly after
Ashot Ghulian; Democratic Party	Arthur Tovmasyan; Free Motherland

General elections were held in the Republic of Artsakh on 31 March 2020, with a second round of the presidential election on 14 April. Voters elected the President and 33 members of the National Assembly. It was the first (and only) time the President and National Assembly were elected at the same time.

The Free Motherland - UCA Alliance, United Motherland, Justice, ARF, and the Democratic Party won seats in National Assembly. No party won the majority of seats, which means that coalition talks are likely to be held within parties.

Presidential candidate Arayik Harutyunyan came first in the first round of the presidential election. A run-off between him and incumbent Foreign Minister Masis Mayilyan was held on 14 April 2020. However, Masis Mayilyan made an announcement urging the people of Artsakh not to participate in the second round of elections in order to prevent the spread of COVID-19. As a result, the majority of Mayilyan's voters from the first round did not vote, and turnout in the second round declined by nearly 30%. However, a majority of Harutyunyan's voters did return to the polls for the second round, in spite of the call to avoid spreading COVID-19, giving him a wide margin of victory in the second round.

== Background ==
Presidential elections were initially scheduled to be held by popular vote in 2017, five years after the 2012 elections. However, after a constitutional referendum in 2017, the country switched from a semi-presidential system to a presidential system. As a result, in the 2017 presidential elections the National Assembly re-elected Bako Sahakyan as president for the next three years until the general election.

The incumbent President Bako Sahakyan declared that he would not run in the elections.

== Electoral system ==
The President of Artsakh was elected using a two-round system. If a candidate took more than 50% of the overall vote, he or she was declared elected. If the 50% threshold was not met by any candidate, a second round of voting would be held. In the second round, only the two most popular candidates from the first round could participate. The winner of the second round would be elected President of Artsakh.

Members of the National Assembly were elected by proportional representation, with between 27 and 33 MPs; the number would be defined by the Electoral Code.

== Presidential candidates ==
- Arayik Harutyunyan, presidential advisor, former Prime Minister and State Minister. Endorsed by the Artsakh Republican Party.
- Masis Mayilyan, incumbent Foreign Affairs Minister; officially an independent candidate but supported by the New Artsakh Alliance and endorsed by Samvel Babayan's United Motherland party and by the Powerful United Homeland Party
- Vitaly Balasanyan, former Secretary of the National Security Council of Artsakh
- Ashot Ghulian, incumbent President of the National Assembly of Artsakh, leader of the Democratic Party of Artsakh

== Conduct ==
140 international observers from 38 countries were registered with the Central Election Commission to monitor the election. At the time of the election, Artsakh's border with Armenia was closed to non-essential travel due to the Coronavirus pandemic. However, international observers were granted an exception provided they first test negative for COVID-19.

Several members of the United States Congress announced that their office employees and senior advisers would visit Artsakh to observe the elections. Congressman Frank Pallone stated that "We want to highlight that democracy works in Artsakh and is in accordance with all the standards of free society."

Prior to the second round of the presidential election, around 200 protesters took to the streets of Stepanakert alleging fraud in the elections held on 31 March. The protestors called for the annulment of the election results, and demanded the unconditional resignation of President Bako Sahakyan, Chief of Police Levon Mnatsakanyan and Secretary of the Security Council Arshavir Gharamyan, as well as fresh elections.

== Results ==
=== President ===
Presidential candidate Arayik Harutyunyan came first in the first round of the presidential election. A run-off between him and incumbent Foreign Minister Masis Mayilyan was held on 14 April 2020. Masis Mayilyan made an announcement prior to the second round urging the people of Artsakh not to participate in the second round of elections in order to prevent the spread of COVID-19. As a result, the majority of Mayilyan's voters from the first round did not vote, and turnout in the second round declined by nearly 30%. However, a majority of Harutyunyan's voters did return to the polls for the second round, in spite of the call to avoid spreading COVID-19, giving him a wide margin of victory in the second round.

Candidate	Party	First round		Second round	
Candidate	Party	Votes	%	Votes	%
Arayik Harutyunyan	Free Motherland - UCA Alliance	36,076	49.17	39,860	88.01
Masis Mayilyan	Independent	19,360	26.39	5,428	11.99
Vitaly Balasanyan	Justice	10,855	14.79		
David Ishkhanyan	Armenian Revolutionary Federation	1,873	2.55		
Ashot Ghulian	Democratic Party of Artsakh	1,683	2.29		
Hayk Khanumyan	National Revival	962	1.31		
Vahan Badasyan	United Armenia Party	743	1.01		
David Babayan	Artsakh Conservative Party	587	0.80		
Ruslan Israelyan	Generation of Independence Party	371	0.51		
Christine Balayan	Independent	202	0.28		
Ashot Dadayan	Independent	198	0.27		
Bella Lalayan	Independent	162	0.22		
Sergey Amiryan	Independent	160	0.22		
Melsik Poghosyan	Independent	141	0.19		
Total		73,373	100.00	45,288	100.00
Valid votes		73,373	96.55	45,288	96.02
Invalid/blank votes		2,622	3.45	1,876	3.98
Total votes		75,995	100.00	47,164	100.00
Registered voters/turnout		104,866	72.47	104,777	45.01
Source: CEC, CEC

=== National Assembly ===
The Free Motherland - UCA Alliance, United Motherland, Justice, ARF, and the Democratic Party won seats in National Assembly. No party won the majority of seats, which means that coalition talks are likely to be held within parties.

Party	Votes	%	Seats	+/–
Free Motherland - UCA Alliance	30,015	40.80	16	+1
United Motherland	17,683	24.04	9	New
Justice	5,867	7.98	3	New
Armenian Revolutionary Federation	4,758	6.47	3	–4
Democratic Party of Artsakh	4,314	5.86	2	–4
New Artsakh Alliance	3,385	4.60	0	New
National Revival	2,175	2.96	0	0
Artsakh Conservative Party	2,156	2.93	0	New
Artsakh Revolutionary Party	1,325	1.80	0	New
United Armenia Party	930	1.26	0	New
Generation of Independence Party	551	0.75	0	New
Communist Party of Artsakh	402	0.55	0	0
Total	73,561	100.00	33	0
Valid votes	73,561	96.82		
Invalid/blank votes	2,419	3.18		
Total votes	75,980	100.00		
Registered voters/turnout	104,866	72.45		
Source: CEC, Armenanews

== International reaction ==
The European Union, the Organisation of Islamic Cooperation, the GUAM Organization for Democracy and Economic Development, the Cooperation Council of Turkic-Speaking States, several governments and embassies of several countries in Turkey or Azerbaijan announced that they did not recognize the election.

Armenian President Armen Sarkissian and Prime Minister Nikol Pashinyan both congratulated the people of Artsakh on the occasion of the elections.

== See also ==
- Elections in the Republic of Artsakh
- List of political parties in Artsakh
- Politics of Artsakh
