= Artsakh Republican Party =

Armenian political party

Artsakh Republican Party logo

The Artsakh Republican Party (Armenian: Արցախի Հանրապետական կուսակցություն, romanized: Arts’akhi Hanrapetakan kusakts’ut’yun) was a political party in Artsakh. Arkadi Ghukasyan, former President of Artsakh, was the chairman of the party.

== History ==
The Artsakh Republican Party was established on 17 May 2015 during a party conference held in Stepanakert. The party declared itself a centre-right party with a liberal outlook which supports the development of democracy, human rights, and equality in Artsakh. The party also seeks to develop a strong and secure state, while seeking international recognition of the country.

Founders of the party include Karen Ohanjanyan, Chairman of the Social Justice Party and Ararat Petrosyan, Chairman of the Armenia is Our Home party. Party leaders announced that the party has no connection with the Republican Party of Armenia, a political party with the same name operating in Armenia.

The party officially endorsed Arayik Harutyunyan prior to the 2020 Artsakhian general election.

The party currently has no representation in the National Assembly and acts as an extra-parliamentary force.

== See also ==
- Elections in Artsakh
- List of political parties in Artsakh
