= 2017 Artsakhian presidential election =

- 19 July 2017

Two-thirds of votes from the 33 National Assembly members required
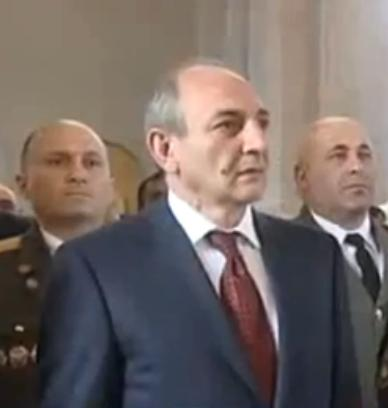
Nominee	Bako Sahakyan	Eduard Aghabekyan
Party	Democratic Party	Movement 88
Electoral vote	28	4
Percentage	87.5%	12.5%
President before election
Bako Sahakyan
Independent
Elected President
Bako Sahakyan
Democratic Party

Indirect presidential elections were held in the unrecognised Republic of Artsakh on 19 July 2017. The incumbent, Bako Sahakyan, was elected to a third term.

== Background ==
After a constitutional referendum in 2017, the country is transitioning from a semi-presidential system to a presidential system. As a result, presidential elections were delayed until 2020 in order to be held alongside legislative elections. In July 2017, the National Assembly elected the President for the next three years until the general election.

== Candidates ==
Two candidates were registered.

The Democratic Party of Artsakh nominated the incumbent president Bako Sahakyan. Free Motherland and the Armenian Revolutionary Federation also supported the incumbent.

While, Movement 88 nominated former Stepanakert Mayor Eduard Aghabekyan.

== Results ==
28 members of National Assembly voted for Bako Sahakyan, 4 of them voted for Eduard Aghabekyan, while one of the MPs abstained.

Candidate	Party	Votes	%
Bako Sahakyan	Democratic Party	28	87.50
Eduard Aghabekyan	Movement 88	4	12.50
Total		32	100.00
Registered voters/turnout		33	–
Source: Media Max
