= United Armenia Party =

United Armenia Party Միացյալ Հայաստան կուսակցություն
- Leader: Vahan Badasyan
- Founded: December 22, 2018
- Headquarters: Stepanakert
- Ideology: Armenian nationalism United Armenia (Armenia-Artsakh unification)
- Political position: Centre
- Slogan: Unity

The United Armenia Party (Armenian: Միացյալ Հայաստան կուսակցություն) was a political party formed in the Republic of Artsakh in 2018, which supported unification with Armenia. The party participated in the 2020 Artsakhian general election. Its leader, Vahan Badasyan, was aligned with Prime Minister of Armenia Nikol Pashinyan and supported the 2018 Armenian Revolution.

== History ==
The United Armenia Party was established on 22 December 2018. In July 2019, party members called on President of Artsakh Bako Sahakyan to resign, citing concerns over corruption. The party also voiced concern over growing poverty in Artsakh. It was registered as a political party on 5 March 2019.

Vahan Badasyan, a former member of parliament for the Armenian Revolutionary Federation, was the United Armenia Party's presidential candidate in the 2020 election. Badasyan was nominated unanimously during a party congress.

An unrelated United Armenia Party was formed in Armenia in 2021.

== Ideology ==
The party's principle ideology is the establishment of a United Armenia. Party leader Badasyan has stated, "The two Armenian states should unite in the near future in a peaceful and smooth way and become one Mighty Homeland - the United Homeland."

Party leader Vahan Badasyan is closely allied with Armenia's prime minister Nikol Pashinyan and believes that Artsakh should closely adhere to Pashinyan's inspiring 'renewal' philosophy which sparked the 2018 Armenian revolution. Badasyan is one of the few political figures in Artsakh who supports Pashinyan's reformist agenda.

== See also ==
- List of political parties in Artsakh
- Politics of Artsakh
