= Samvel Babayan =

Armenian general

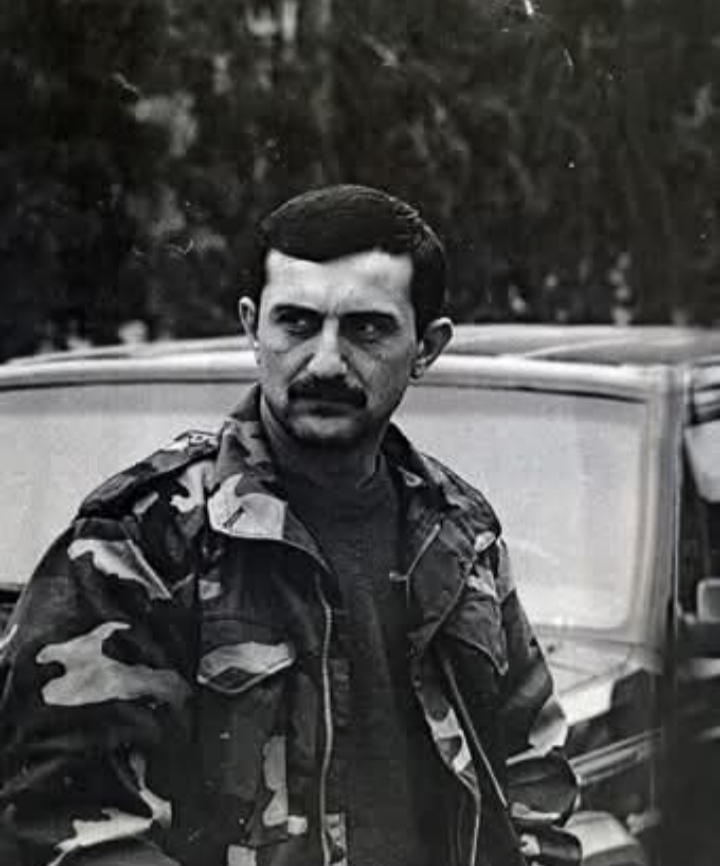

Secretary of the Security Council of Artsakh
- In office 29 May 2020 – 10 November 2020
- President: Arayik Harutyunyan
- Preceded by: Vitaly Balasanyan
- Succeeded by: Vitaly Balasanyan

Minister of Defence of the Nagorno Karabakh Republic
- In office January 1995 – August 1999
- President: Leonard Petrosyan; Arkadi Ghukasyan
- Preceded by: position established
- Succeeded by: Seyran Ohanyan

Personal details
- Born: 5 March 1965 (age 61) Stepanakert, Nagorno-Karabakh AO, Soviet Union
- Party: Liberal Party; Dashink (previously); United Homeland Party (Artsakh)
- Occupation: Soldier, Politician
- Awards: Hero of Artsakh (Renounced in 2020)

Military service
- Allegiance: Soviet Union; Republic of Artsakh
- Branch/service: (Soviet Union) Soviet Army; Artsakh Defense Army
- Years of service: 1983–1985; 1988–2000; 2020
- Rank: Lieutenant General
- Battles/wars: First Nagorno-Karabakh War; Battle of Shusha; Battle of Kalbajar; Battle of Aghdam; Operation Kalbajar; Second Nagorno-Karabakh War

Samvel Andraniki Babayan (Armenian: Սամվել Անդրանիկի Բաբայան; born 5 March 1965) is an Armenian military officer and politician. He was one of the founders and main commanders of the Artsakh Defence Army during the First Nagorno-Karabakh War and became a war hero among Armenians for the military victories achieved under his command.

Following the war, he served as the Defense Minister of the Nagorno-Karabakh Republic from 1994 to 2000. During this period, Babayan "became not only the military leader but the most powerful man in Karabakh overall, controlling its government and economy" until his arrest and imprisonment in 2000 on charges of attempting to assassinate Arkadi Ghukasyan, President of the Nagorno-Karabakh Republic. Babayan was released from prison early in 2004. He served as Secretary of the Security Council of Artsakh from May 2020 until November 2020, when he resigned after Armenia's defeat in the Second Nagorno-Karabakh War.

== Biography ==
=== Early life ===
Babayan was born on 5 March 1965 in Stepanakert, Nagorno-Karabakh Autonomous Oblast, Azerbaijan SSR. In 1982, he finished Armenian secondary school #7 named after Yeghishe Charents in Stepanakert. From 1983 to 1985, he served in the Soviet military contingent in East Germany. According to Thomas de Waal, Babayan made his living as a garage mechanic and car-washer and also worked at a café before the First Nagorno-Karabakh War.

=== First Nagorno-Karabakh War ===
In 1988, Samvel Babayan enlisted in a paramilitary unit and rose to command his own unit. From 1989 to 1991 he was the commander of the Stepanakert Second Volunteers Company and a member of the Stepanakert underground central headquarters. In 1991 he was arrested by Azerbaijani authorities for his paramilitary activities but was released the same year in exchange for an Azerbaijani official captured by Armenian forces. Babayan rose to prominence during the military phase of the Nagorno-Karabakh conflict, in 1991–1994. Babayan coordinated Armenian operations in Karabakh, participated in the planning of the capture of Shusha and was the commander of the Lachin front. As unified military command began to be established in Nagorno-Karabakh in 1992–1993, Babayan became the Commander of the Nagorno-Karabakh Defense Army in 1993, after his predecessor Serzh Sargsyan left to become Armenia's Defense Minister. Under his command, the Karabakhi military won a number of strategic battles against the Azerbaijani military and regained control over most of Nagorno-Karabakh as well as partially controlling 7 districts of Azerbaijan. Babayan was one of the signatories of the 1994 ceasefire which ended the First Nagorno-Karabakh War.

=== Post-war leadership and arrest ===
Samvel Babayan established himself as the most powerful man in Nagorno-Karabakh in the aftermath of the war. According to Thomas de Waal, Babayan acquired significant wealth by selling materials taken from the Azerbaijani districts surrounding Nagorno-Karabakh and by establishing a monopoly over cigarette and fuel imports to Nagorno-Karabakh through a company registered in his wife's name. Babayan used his position to acquire land, businesses and tax privileges. After Nagorno-Karabakh's president Robert Kocharyan left his position to become prime minister of Armenia, Babayan became even more influential in Karabakh's civilian politics. In June 1998, he forced Nagorno-Karabakh's prime minister Leonard Petrosyan to resign. At a joint session of the security councils of Armenia and the Nagorno-Karabakh Republic in January 1998, at the urging of Vazgen Sargsyan, Robert Kocharyan, and Serzh Sargsyan, Babayan spoke strongly against President of Armenia Levon Ter-Petrosyan's plan to accept the OSCE Minsk Group's proposals to return some of the territory captured from Azerbaijan during the war and deploy international peacekeepers there; Ter-Petrosyan was forced to resign a month later. Babayan then began to intervene in Armenian politics, funding the "Law and Unity" bloc in the 1999 Armenian parliamentary election, where the bloc came in third. After this, Armenia's prime minister Vazgen Sargsyan and Robert Kocharyan (now president of Armenia) decided to restrain Babayan's growing influence.

Robert Kocharyan was unable to deal with the Babayan issue directly due to the political chaos in Armenia following the Armenian parliament shooting in October 1999, leaving it to the government of Nagorno-Karabakh under president Arkadi Ghukasyan and the new Karabakh Army leadership. In December 1999, Babayan was forced to relinquish his position as the commander of the Nagorno-Karabakh Defense Army. On 22 March 2000, Babayan was arrested on charges of launching an assassination attempt on Arkadi Ghukasyan, which left the president seriously wounded but alive. After Babayan's arrest, Nagorno-Karabakh authorities confiscated Babayan's real estate, nationalized or closed down his enterprises, and detained or removed from office hundreds of officials loyal to him.

Babayan was tried for organizing the attempt on Ghukasyan's life along with 15 of his associates. The trial began on 18 September 2000 and ended on 26 February 2001, when Babayan was sentenced to 14 years of prison, stripped of several decorations and ranks, and disenfranchised. Two of his associates were also sentenced to 14 years and the other defendants were given lesser sentences.

During the investigation and while serving his sentence, Babayan's health greatly deteriorated. He was said to suffer from hepatitis and other ailments which could not be treated in prison. On 18 September 2004, Samvel Babayan was released from maximum-security prison in Shusha due to health concerns, with the terms of release including a probationary period and continued disenfranchisement.

=== Politics after release and 2017 arrest ===
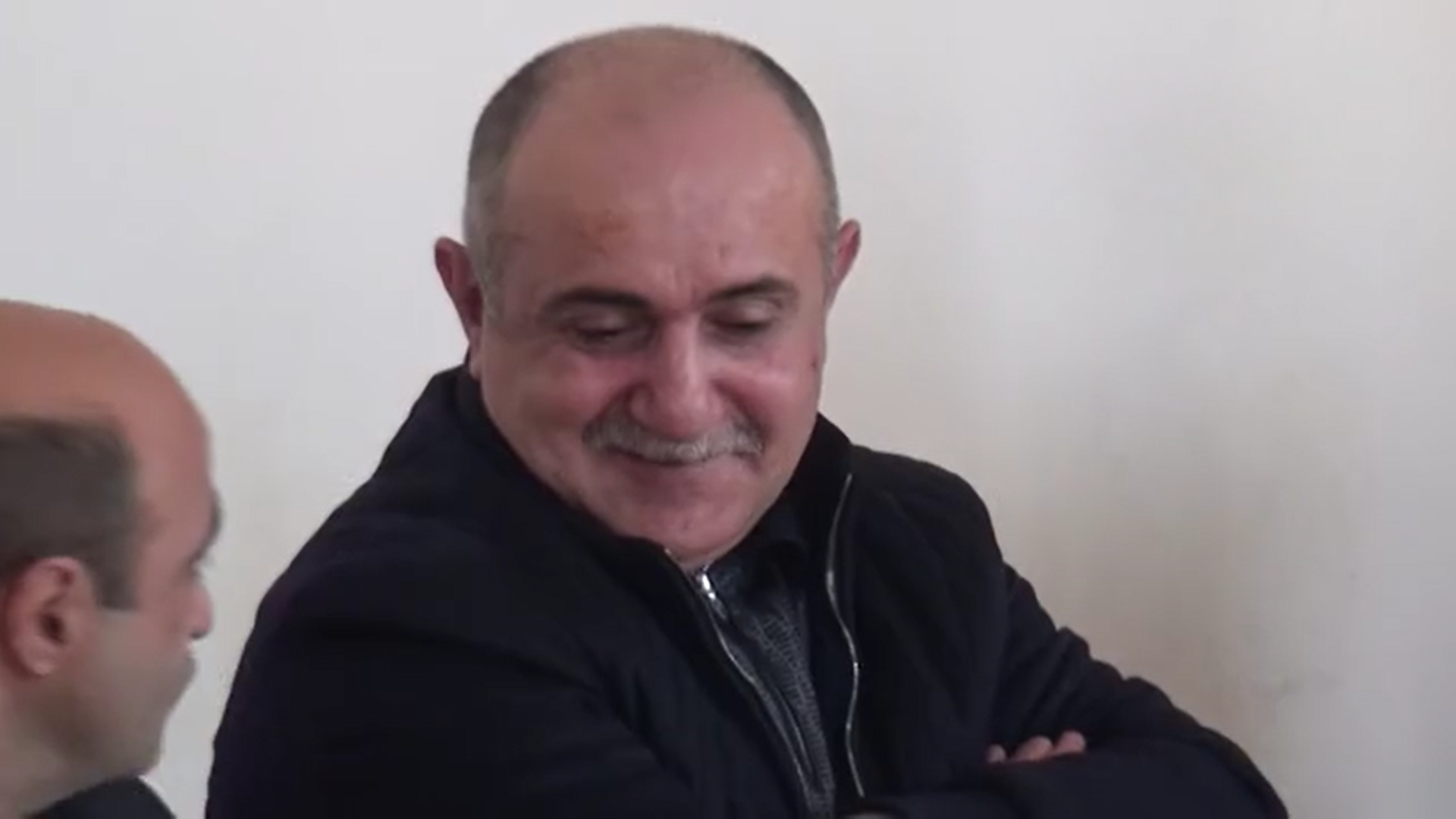
Babayan in 2017

In November 2005, Samvel Babayan founded the Dashink ("Alliance") political party with his supporters. The party did not achieve any major success.

Babayan returned to Armenia in May 2016 after a de facto exile in Moscow, shortly after major clashes on the Nagorno-Karabakh line of contact. He stated, "Whether I was in Karabakh, Armenia or abroad, the security concerns of my country, my people have always been on my mind. I have the full grasp of the military situation, the problems at the frontlines and possess all necessary information."

In the lead-up to the 2017 Armenian parliamentary election, Babayan supported the pre-election coalition of ex-defense minister of Armenia Seyran Ohanyan (a fellow Karabakh Armenian and ex-defense minister of Nagorno-Karabakh). In March 2017, Babayan was arrested by the Armenian National Security Service on charges of smuggling surface-to-air missiles and counterfeit Euros. On 28 November 2017, Babayan was convicted to six years in prison. He was released from detention following the 2018 Armenian revolution.

Babayan founded the United Homeland Party in Artsakh in September 2019. Babayan launched a presidential campaign for the 2020 Artsakhian general election, but was disqualified from participation. He later endorsed Masis Mayilyan.

On 29 May 2020, he was appointed Secretary of the Security Council of Artsakh.

=== Second Nagorno-Karabakh War and aftermath ===
During the 2020 Nagorno-Karabakh war, Babayan was involved in the mobilization of Karabakh Armenian reservists and participated in the planning of a number of operations with Artsakh Defense Army commander Jalal Harutyunyan. After the end of the war, Babayan revealed that he was involved in the planning of the defense of Shusha in the last week of the war, but that three battalions had refused to carry out their orders. He also revealed after the war that he proposed the idea of the failed operation that occurred on October 5–6, 2020, which was an attempt to cut off the Azerbaijani breakthrough near Horadiz (the so-called "Lalatapa operation", although Babayan claimed that the operation took place some 10 kilometers away from Lalatapa).

On November 10, 2020 he resigned as Nagorno-Karabakh Republic Security Council Secretary and renounced the title Hero of Artsakh due to the conditions of the 2020 Nagorno-Karabakh ceasefire agreement, accusing both leaders of Armenia and Artsakh of treason and criminal actions.

=== Founding of the Liberal Party and 2021 Armenian elections ===
In April 2021, Babayan announced his intention to participate in the 2021 Armenian parliamentary election. Babayan ran in the Armenian parliamentary election in June 2021 as the prime ministerial candidate for the Liberal Party, which he founded in March 2021. The party received 14,936 votes, amounting to 1.17% of all votes, below the 5% threshold required to enter parliament.

== Personal information and titles ==
Babayan has been awarded with the army ranks of lieutenant colonel (1992), colonel (1993), major general (1994) and lieutenant general (1996). He has been awarded with the Golden Eagle medal of the Nagorno-Karabakh Republic (1997) and has been declared a Hero of Artsakh (he renounced the title after the 2020 Nagorno-Karabakh ceasefire agreement). He is married and has three children. His brother Karen Babayan previously served as Mayor of Stepanakert and Minister of Internal Affairs of the Nagorno-Karabakh Republic.

== See also ==
- Nagorno-Karabakh Defense Army
