= Romela Dadayan =

Member of the National Assembly of Nagorno-Karabakh

- Ռոմելա Դադայան
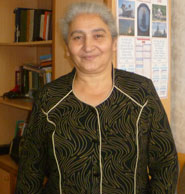

Member of the National Assembly of Nagorno-Karabakh

Romela Dadayan (Armenian: Ռոմելա Դադայան) was a member of the National Assembly of Nagorno-Karabakh.
