= Movement 88 =

Movement 88 Շարժում 88
- Leader: Vitaly Balasanyan
- Headquarters: Stepanakert

Movement 88 (Armenian: Շարժում 88) was a political party in Artsakh.

== History ==
The party was part of an electoral alliance with the Armenian Revolutionary Federation, that won 3 out of 33 seats in the National Assembly following the 2005 Nagorno-Karabakh parliamentary election.

The party did not participate in the 2010 Nagorno-Karabakh parliamentary election. The party decided to participate in the 2015 Nagorno-Karabakh parliamentary election receiving 6.93% of the popular vote and won two seats in the National Assembly.

While the party decided not to participate in the 2020 Artsakhian general election, the party endorsed the Free Motherland - UCA Alliance.

The party currently holds no political representation and acts as an extra-parliamentary force.

== See also ==
- List of political parties in Artsakh
