= Liberal Party (Armenia) =

Liberal Party Ազատական կուսակցություն
- Leader: Samvel Babayan
- Founded: 2021
- Headquarters: Yerevan
- Ideology: Liberalism; Pro-Europeanism
- Slogan: "Safe and secure homeland"

Website
- Facebook page

The Liberal Party (Armenian: Ազատական կուսակցություն, romanized: Azatakan kusakts’ut’yun) is an Armenian political party. It was founded on 1 March 2021 and is currently led by Samvel Babayan, former defense minister of the Republic of Artsakh and leader of the United Motherland party in Artsakh.

== History ==
The Liberal Party was founded in March 2021 and subsequently announced its intentions to participate in the 2021 Armenian parliamentary election. The party won 1.17% of the popular vote in the election, failing to win any seats in the National Assembly. The party accepted the results of the election and congratulated Prime Minister Nikol Pashinyan on his reelection. Currently, the party acts as an extra-parliamentary force.

In November 2021, the party participated in local elections in the city of Meghri, winning two seats on the Meghri city council.

== Ideology ==
The party favors strengthening Armenia's military and protecting the territorial integrity of Armenia and Artsakh. The party's leader Samvel Babayan advocates for the creation of a professional army.

The party believes that peace, stability, and economic development in the South Caucasus region can be achieved through continued European integration and eventual membership in the European Union. The party has also called for Armenia to withdraw from the Russian-led Eurasian Economic Union in the event that Azerbaijan becomes a member state.

== Electoral record ==
=== Parliamentary elections ===
Election	Leader	Votes	%	Seats	+/–	Position	Government
2021	Samvel Babayan	14,936	1.17	0 / 107	0	▲11th	Extra-parliamentary

== See also ==
- Programs of political parties in Armenia
