= United Civic Alliance Party =

United Civic Alliance Party Քաղաքացիական Միացյալ Դաշինք Kaghakatsiakan Miacial Dashink
- Leader: Aram Harutyunyan
- Founded: 29 September 2018
- Headquarters: Stepanakert
- National affiliation: Free Motherland - UCA Alliance
- National Assembly: 0 / 33 (0%)

United Civic Alliance Party (Armenian: Քաղաքացիական Միացյալ Դաշինք) was a political party in the Republic of Artsakh, founded on 29 September 2018.

== Electoral record ==
The party participated in the 2020 Artsakhian general election as a part of the Free Motherland - UCA Alliance. Following the election, the alliance won 16 seats out of 33 in the National Assembly.

Election	Alliance	Votes	%	Seats
2020	part of Free Motherland - UCA Alliance	29,688	40.43	16 / 33

== Ideology ==
The parties support base is primarily among youth and young professionals. The party supports the socio-economic development of Artsakh, the creation of a strong civil-society, and increasing the welfare of citizens. The party is in favour of the reunification of Artsakh with Armenia.

== See also ==
- List of political parties in Artsakh
