= United Motherland =

United Motherland Միասնական Հայրենիք
- Leader: Samvel Babayan
- Founded: 22 September 2019
- Headquarters: Stepanakert
- Ideology: Armenian nationalism United Armenia
- Colours: Armenian national colours: Orange; Blue; Red
- National Assembly: 9 / 33 (27%)

Website
- Facebook page

United Motherland (Armenian: Միասնական Հայրենիք), also known as United Homeland, was a political party in the Republic of Artsakh. It was founded on 22 September 2019 by Samvel Babayan, who was its leader during the party's history.

== Electoral record ==
The party participated in the 2020 Artsakhian general election and won 9 seats out of 33 in the National Assembly.

Election	Votes	%	Seats	Government
2020	17,365	23.65	9 / 33	No

== Ideology ==
Prior to the 2020 election, the party pledged its support for presidential candidate Masis Mayilyan. Following the 2020 election, Samvel Babayan announced his support for newly elected President Arayik Harutyunyan. Babayan announced that a political cooperation memorandum would be signed between United Motherland and the Free Motherland - UCA Alliance. Babayan also proclaimed that his party would seek to strengthen security, social welfare and would create a new political culture in Artsakh where freedom of expression will be a priority.

== See also ==
- List of political parties in Artsakh
