= Social Justice Party (Nagorno Karabakh) =

Artsakh political party

The Social Justice Party (Armenian: Սոցիալական արդարություն կուսակցություն) was a political party in Artsakh, founded in 2005.

== History ==
The chairperson of the Social Justice Party is Karen Ohanjanyan, coordinator of the human rights organization, Helsinki Initiative '92, which is part of the Helsinki Citizens Assembly network. The Social Justice Party failed to receive any seats following the 2005 Nagorno-Karabakh parliamentary election and obtained just 0.04% of the popular vote.

The party did not participate in the 2015 Nagorno-Karabakh parliamentary election and currently has no representation in the National Assembly.

== See also ==
- Elections in Artsakh
- List of political parties in Artsakh
