= Masis Mayilyan =

Artsakhian politician

- Մասիս Մայիլյան
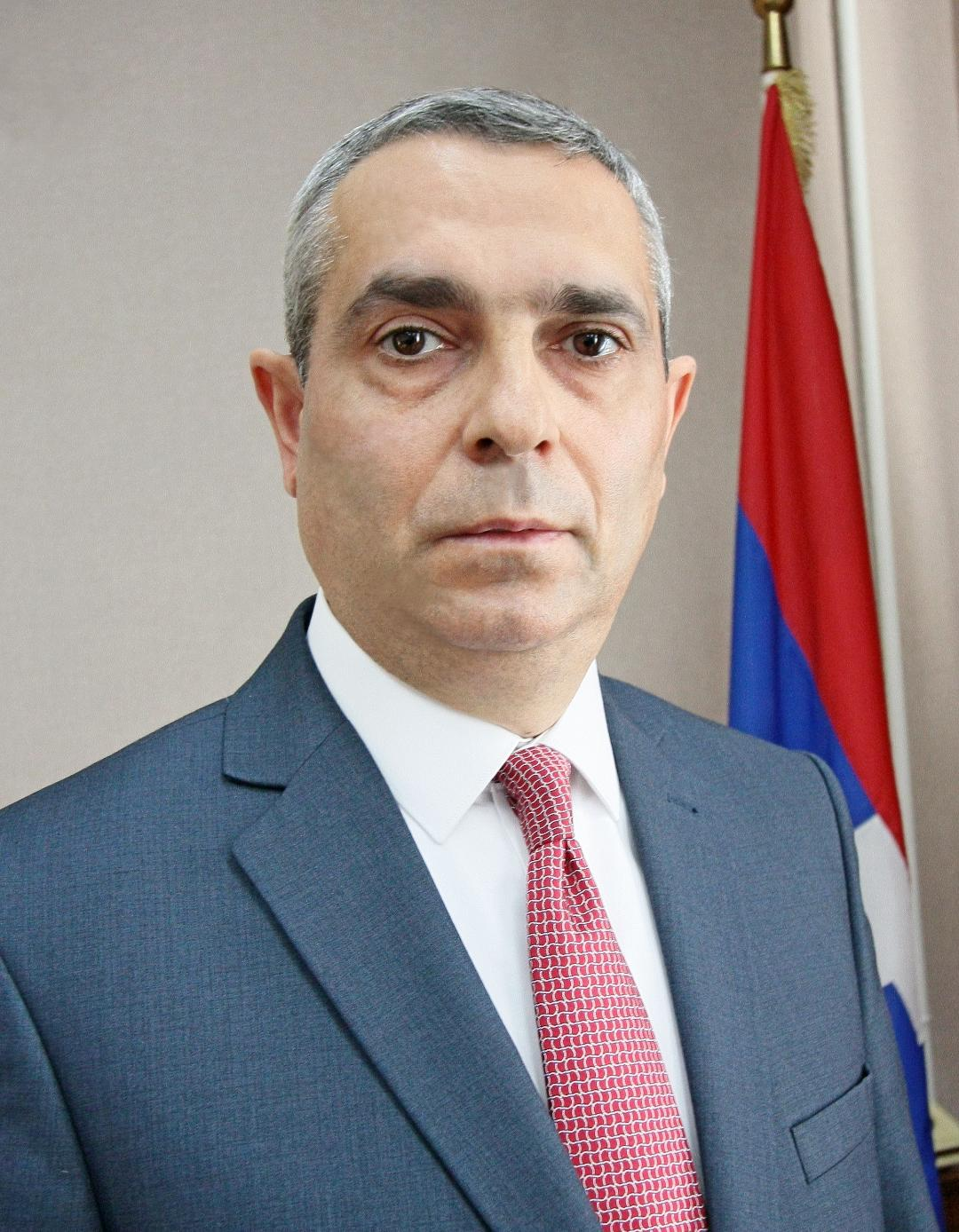
- Mayilyan in 2018

Foreign Minister of Artsakh
- In office 25 September 2017 – 4 January 2021
- President: Bako Sahakyan; Arayik Harutyunyan
- Preceded by: Karen Mirzoyan
- Succeeded by: David Babayan

Personal details
- Born: 14 September 1967 (age 57); Stepanakert, Nagorno-Karabakh, Azerbaijan SSR, Soviet Union
- Political party: Independent

Masis Samveli Mayilyan (Armenian: Մասիս Սամվելի Մայիլյան; born 14 September 1967) is a politician, diplomat and former presidential candidate who previously worked in the Republic of Artsakh. From September 2017 until January 2021, he served as the Foreign Minister of Artsakh.

== Biography ==
=== Early life and education ===
Mayilyan was born on 14 September 1967 in Stepanakert, the capital of the Nagorno-Karabakh Autonomous Oblast, then a part of the Azerbaijani SSR. From 1984 to 1991 he studied at the Stepanakert State Pedagogical Institute and graduated from the Department of Physics and Mathematics, majoring in engineering and physics. From 1991 to 1992 he pursued his postgraduate studies Armenian State Pedagogical University in Yerevan. He graduated from the Diplomatic Academy of Vienna in 1998.

=== Career ===
Mayilyan began his career at the State Defense Committee of the Nagorno-Karabakh Republic from 1992 to 1993. He worked as the chief expert for the committee's information and press sections. In 1993 he began his work at the Foreign Ministry of the Nagorno-Karabakh Republic, where he occupied various posts and participated in the negotiation process for the resolution of the Nagorno-Karabakh conflict. From 2001 to 2007, he served as Deputy Foreign Minister under President Arkadi Ghukasyan.

=== 2007 Artsakh presidential election ===
In the 2007 Artsakh presidential election, Mayilyan ran for President of Artsakh for the first time, receiving 12.53% of the vote and coming in at second place behind Bako Sahakyan, who won 85.12% of the vote and became Artsakh's third president.

=== Foreign Minister and 2020 presidential campaign ===
On 25 September 2017, Mayilyan was appointed Foreign Minister by President Bako Sahakyan. He participated in 2020 Artsakhian general election as a presidential candidate and was endorsed by New Artsakh Alliance and Samvel Babayan's United Motherland party. He came at the second place in the first round of the election and a run-off between him and Arayik Harutyunyan was held on 14 April 2020. However, he made an announcement urging the people of Artsakh not to participate in the second round of elections in order to prevent the spread of COVID-19. Mayilyan received nearly 12% in the run-off vote, while Arayik Harutyunyan received 88% of the vote and became the 4th President of Artsakh.

Mayilyan was reappointed to the post of foreign minister after the inauguration of President Arayik Harutyunyan in May 2020. On 1 December 2020, in the aftermath of the 2020 Nagorno-Karabakh War, President Harutyunyan announced that a national unity government would be formed and a number of cabinet officials would be replaced. Masis Mayilyan was dismissed in early January 2021 and was made an ambassador-at-large. He was succeeded by David Babayan.

== See also ==
- List of current foreign ministers
- Foreign relations of Artsakh

Political offices
Preceded by Karen Mirzoyan	Foreign Minister of Artsakh; 25 September 2017–4 January 2021	Succeeded by David Babayan
