= David Babayan =

Artsakh politician

- Դավիթ Բաբայան
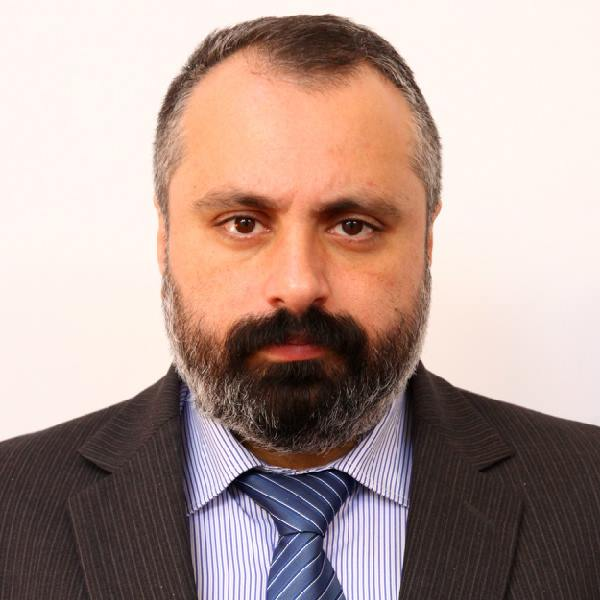

Foreign Minister of Artsakh
- In office 4 January 2021 – 11 January 2023
- Preceded by: Masis Mayilyan
- Succeeded by: Sergey Ghazaryan

Personal details
- Born: 5 April 1973 (age 53) Stepanakert, Nagorno-Karabakh Autonomous Oblast, Azerbaijan SSR, Soviet Union

David Klimi Babayan (Armenian: Դավիթ Կլիմի Բաբայան, Davit' Klimi Babayan; born 5 April 1973) is a politician who served as the advisor to the president of Artsakh from 17 January 2023 until the 2023 Azerbaijani offensive in Nagorno-Karabakh. He previously served as the foreign minister of Artsakh. From 28 December 2013 he served as head of the Central Information Department of the Artsakh Republic. He also served as the Deputy Chief of Staff in the office of the President of the Republic. On 26 May 2020, he was appointed as an adviser to the President on foreign relations. On 4 January 2021, Babayan was appointed the Minister of Foreign Relations taking over from Masis Mayilyan. He founded and currently leads the Artsakh Conservative Party. After the 2023 Azerbaijani offensive in Nagorno-Karabakh, he surrendered himself to the Azerbaijani authorities and is currently facing criminal charges in Azerbaijan.

== Education ==
He attended Yerevan Institute of National Economy (1989–1994) graduating with a diploma in economics. He attended the American University of Armenia (1994–1997) where he graduated as a Master of Arts. He also has a degree of Master of Arts from the Central European University, Budapest (1997–1998). He holds a doctorate in historical science from Armenian National Academy of Sciences (2002–2005).

== Career ==
Since 2004, Babayan has been employed by the Artsakh University as a lecturer in political science, geopolitics. From 1998 to 2007, he was also employed by the Russian-Armenian University lecturing in law. He has published more than 300 books and monographs of scientific research in the areas of the Azerbaijani-Karabagh conflict settlement, Caucasian geopolitics, great power competition and Chinese geopolitics.

In parallel with these positions, he was also held positions in government ministries of the Artsakh Republic including the Ministry of Foreign Affairs of the (2000 - 2001); the Presidential Planning Group (2001 - 2015); Assistant to the President (2005 - 2007); Head of the Central Information Department of the Office President (2007 - 2021). From January 4, 2021 to January 12, 2023, he was the Minister of Foreign Affairs of the Artsakh Republic. In his capacity as Foreign Minister, he has sent letters to the United Nations, the Council of Europe and the co-chairs of the OSCE Minsk Group highlighting the illegal detention of Armenian servicemen and civilians in the Republic of Azerbaijan. On January 17, 2023, he was appointed Advisor to the President of the Artsakh Republic - Representative at Large of the Artsakh Republic President.

He has chaired the party that he founded - the Artsakh Conservative Party - since 17 April 2019.

=== Surrender to Azerbaijani authorities ===
Following the 2023 Azerbaijani offensive in Nagorno-Karabakh on 19 and 20 September and the capitulation of Artsakh, Babayan announced his departure to Azerbaijani-controlled Shusha and his surrender to the Azerbaijani authorities, adding that "my failure to appear, or worse, my escape, will cause serious harm to our long-suffering nation, to many people, and I, as an honest person, hard worker, patriot and Christian, cannot allow this."

On 30 September 2023, the Prosecutor General's Office of Azerbaijan announced that Babayan had been detained. He has been charged with “planning, preparing, unleashing and waging an aggressive war.” On 3 October 2023, he and three former presidents of Artsakh, Arkadi Ghukasyan, Bako Sahakyan and Arayik Harutyunyan, were detained by the State Security Service of Azerbaijan and brought to Baku.

On 5 February 2026, an Azerbaijan military court sentenced Babayan to life imprisonment on charges such as "waging an aggressive war," "violent seizure of power", etc.

== Honours and awards ==
- 2016 – Awarded with Artsakh Republic "Vachagan Barepasht" state medal.
- Holds the diplomatic rank of Ambassador Extraordinary and Plenipotentiary.

== Publications ==
David Babayan is the author of more than 300 publications and 8 monographs:

- The Issue of Water Within the Context of the Nagorno Karabagh Conflict Settlement, Stepanakert, "Dizak Plus", 2007, 143 pages.
- Political History of the Karabagh Khanate within the Context of Artsakh Armenian Diplomacy, Yerevan, "Antares", 2007, 119 pages, republished as Artsakh Meliks and Karabagh Khanate, Stavropol (Russian Federation), "Stavropolblankizdat", 2008.
- Modern Chinese Geopolitics. Some Directions and Forms, Noravank Scientific Education Fund, Yerevan,2010, 352 pages.
- Chinese Policy in Central Asia, the Caucasus and Northern Caspian Sea Region in the end of XX – beginning of XXI Century, Institute of Oriental Studies of the Russian Academy of Sciences, Moscow, 2013, 328 pages.
- The Role and Place of the Armenian Plateau in Biblical Geopolitics, Yerevan, 2015, 110 pages.
- Hydro-Policy of the Azerbaijani-Karabagh Conflict, Moscow-Yerevan, 2019, 168 pages.
- Ethno-National Geopolitics of Azerbaijan and the Reaction of National Minorities. Part I. The Kurds and Tats, Moscow, 2022.
- Karabagh Hydro-Geopolitics: Existential Issues for Present and Future, Yerevan, 2022.
- Karabagh Issue and Foreign Policy of the Republic of Artsakh. Facts and Recommendations on Main Ideas and Key Concepts, Stepanakert-Yerevan, 2022, 94 p. (Chief Editor)

Member of the scientific and publishing councils of encyclopedia "Armenia" (Yerevan, 2012) and Agricultural Encyclopedia (Yerevan, 2015).

Political offices
Preceded by Masis Mayilyan	Minister of Foreign Affairs of Artsakh; 2021–2023	Succeeded by Sergey Ghazaryan
