= 2012 Nagorno-Karabakh presidential election =

- 19 July 2012
- Turnout: 73.53%
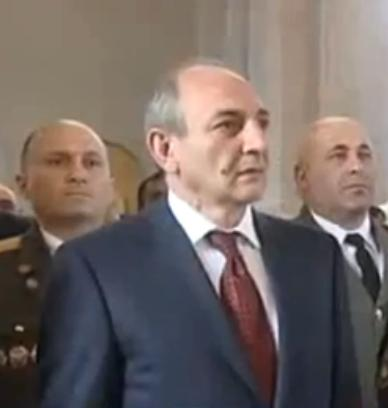

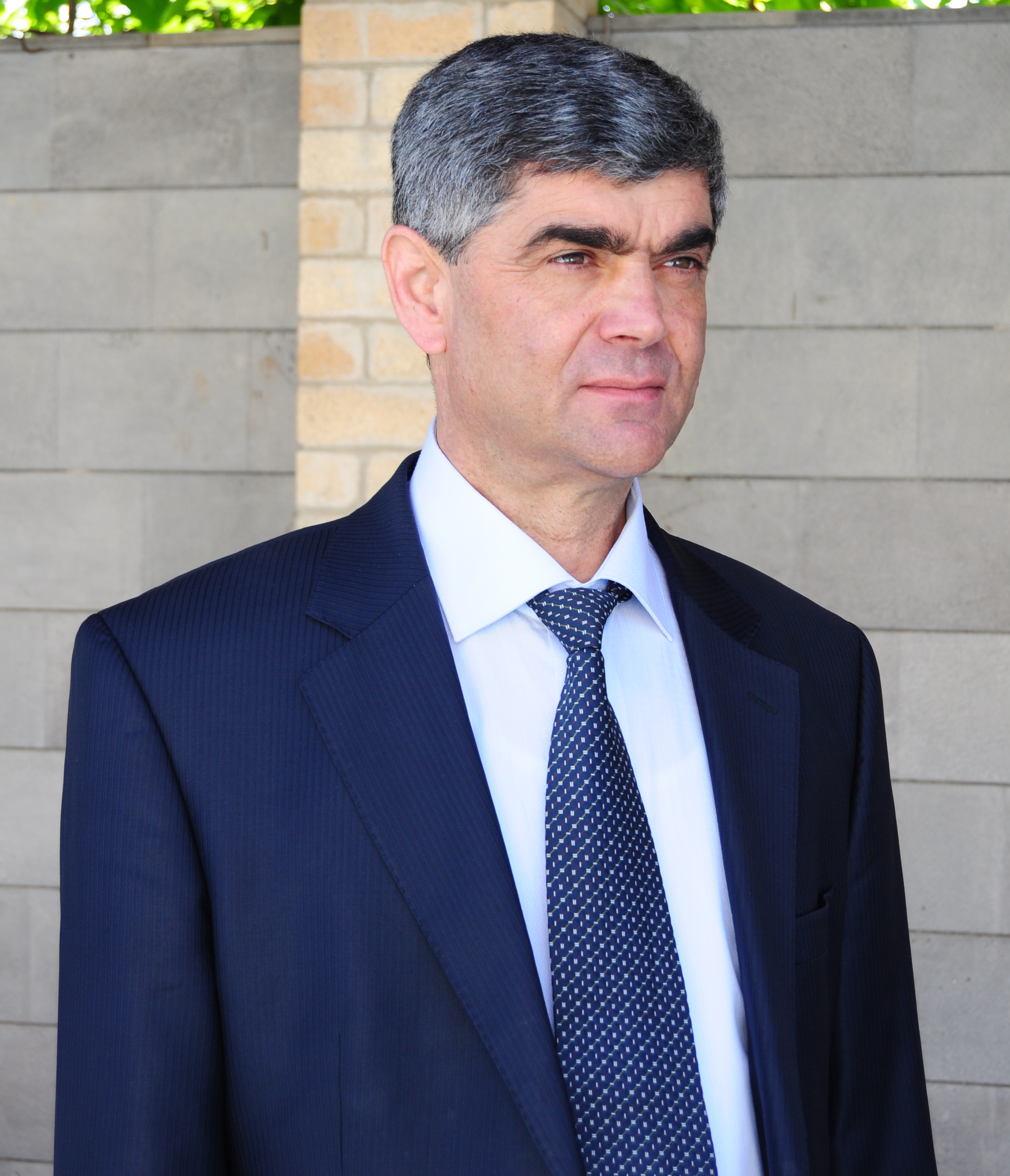
Nominee	Bako Sahakyan	Vitaly Balasanyan
Party	Independent	Independent
Popular vote	47,095	22,967
Percentage	66.65%	32.51%
- Results by province Sahakyan: 50–60% 60–70% 70–80% 80–90% >90%
President before election
Bako Sahakyan
Independent
Elected President
Bako Sahakyan
Independent

Presidential elections were held in Nagorno-Karabakh on 19 July 2012. Incumbent President Bako Sahakyan was re-elected for a second five-year term, receiving around two-thirds of the vote.

== Campaign ==
Four candidates registered to run in the election; incumbent President Bako Sahakyan, Deputy Minister of Defence Vitaly Balasanyan, the rector of Stepanakert University Arkady Soghomonyan and Valery Khachatryan. Khachatryan later pulled out of the election race.

As part of the campaign, Balasanyan sent an open letter to Sahakyan, claiming that "authorities have accumulated a vast experience of fraud, illegal involvement of law enforcement and national security agencies in the electoral processes, an inflation of the number of voters on voters’ lists, different kinds of pressure on voters, etc. This has led to apathy in society, distrust of people in the electoral process in the country and a decline of the image of the state."

Campaigning ended on 17 July at midnight, with no campaigning allowed on the day before the election.

== Conduct ==
The elections were attended by more than 100 observers; among them were 80 international observers from countries including Russia, Armenia, the United States, France, Canada, Ireland, Poland, Cyprus, Germany, Belgium, Israel, the Czech Republic, Hungary, Austria, Bulgaria. A total of 93 journalists were accredited to cover the elections, 50 from foreign media.

== Results ==
A total of 98,909 voters registered for the elections. Voting took place in 274 electoral districts, with an additional polling station in Yerevan, Armenia.

Candidate	Party	Votes	%
Bako Sahakyan	Independent	47,095	66.65
Vitaly Balasanyan	Independent	22,967	32.51
Arkady Soghomonyan	Independent	593	0.84
Total		70,655	100.00
Valid votes		70,655	96.84
Invalid/blank votes		2,303	3.16
Total votes		72,958	100.00
Registered voters/turnout		99,227	73.53
Source: CEC

== Reactions ==
Due to Nagorno-Karabakh's being de jure part of Azerbaijan, recognised as such by the international community, the election did not receive international support.

The European Union High Representative for Foreign Affairs and Security Policy Catherine Ashton stated that the EU did not recognise the constitutional and legal framework within which the presidential election was held. NATO Secretary General Anders Fogh Rasmussen's Special Representative for the Caucasus and Central Asia James Appathurai described the election as counter-productive for a peaceful settlement of the conflict and said that NATO did not intend to recognise it. Chair of the Organization for Security and Co-operation in Europe Eamon Gilmore released a statement according to which the OSCE does not recognise the independence of Nagorno-Karabakh and thus the election will not have any impact on the ongoing peace negotiations.

The Ministry of Foreign Affairs of Azerbaijan called the election "a provocative attempt," contrary to efforts in resolving the Nagorno-Karabakh conflict. A spokesperson for the ministry added that every foreign citizen who attended the election as an observer would be declared persona non grata and denied entry into Azerbaijan in the future. In the following days, the Ministries of Foreign Affairs of Turkey, Romania, Georgia, Russia, Germany, Latvia, and Iran and embassies of Israel, the United Kingdom, Canada, Australia, and New Zealand, made similar statements in denying the legitimacy of the election.
