= Justice (Artsakh) =

Justice Արդարություն Ardarutyun
- Leader: Vitaly Balasanyan
- Founded: 7 September 2018
- Headquarters: Stepanakert
- Ideology: Liberalism
- National Assembly: 2 / 33 (6%)

Justice (Armenian: Արդարություն, romanized: Ardarutyun), officially known as the Artsakh Justice Party (Armenian: Արդարություն կուսակցություն, romanized: Ardarutyun kusaktsutyun) was a political party in the Republic of Artsakh. It was founded on 7 September 2018. Marsel Petrosyan, Mikael Soghomonyan, Hakob Hakobyan and Norayr Musaelyan are the party's founders and co-presidents.

== Electoral record ==
The party participated in the 2020 Artsakhian general election and won 9 seats out of 33 in the National Assembly. The presidential candidate of the party Vitaly Balasanyan, came in third place, gaining 14% of the vote.

Election	Votes	%	Seats	Government
2020	5,865	7.99	3 / 33	No

== Activities ==
In April 2021, the party signed a memorandum of cooperation with the Constitutional Rights Union party.

== See also ==
- List of political parties in Artsakh
