= Communist Party of Artsakh =

Communist Party of Artsakh Արցախի կոմունիստական կուսակցություն
- Chairman: Hrant Melkumyan
- Headquarters: Stepanakert
- Ideology: Communism; Marxism–Leninism
- Colours: Red
- National Assembly: 0 / 33

The Communist Party of Artsakh (Armenian: Արցախի կոմունիստական կուսակցություն) was a communist political party in the Republic of Artsakh.

== History ==
The party failed to receive any seats in the National Assembly following the June 2005 elections, the May 2010 elections, and the May 2015 elections.

For the 2005 election, the party fielded 10 candidates for the Proportional Representation seats and candidates in 4 single-member constituencies. For the 2010 election, the party presented a list for the Proportional Representation seats as well as one candidate in one of the 16 single-member seats.

As of 2014, Hrant Melkumyan served as the chairman of the party. Melkumyam contested the 2007 Nagorno-Karabakh presidential election. He obtained 554 votes (0.8%).

The party publishes Artsakhi komunist (Արցախի կոմունիստ), with pages in Armenian and Russian.

== Election results ==
Election year	# of overall votes	% of overall vote	# of overall seats won	+/–	Government
2005	295	0.48 (#7)	0 / 101	Steady	No
2010	3,057	4.6 (#4)	0 / 101	Steady	No
2015	1,136	1.65 (#6)	0 / 101	Steady	No
2020	480	0.65 (#12)	0 / 101	Steady	No

== See also ==
- Armenian Communist Party, brother party in Armenia
- List of political parties in Artsakh
