= National Revival (Artsakh) =

National Revival Ազգային վերածնունդ Azgayin Veratsnund
- Leader: Hayk Khanumyan
- Founded: 16 May 2013
- Headquarters: Stepanakert
- Ideology: Armenian nationalism Social democracy Environmentalism; United Armenia (Armenia-Artsakh unification)
- Political position: Centre-left
- Colors
- National Assembly: 0 / 33

Website
- http://avk.am/

National Revival (Armenian: Ազգային վերածնունդ, romanized: Azgayin veratsnund) was a social democratic opposition political party in the Republic of Artsakh. It was founded on 16 May 2013. Hayk Khanumyan was the party's founder and leader.

== Ideology ==
The party describes itself as an Armenian nationalist and social democratic party. The party's goals are the separation of the government and business, establishing an eco-friendly economy and promoting rural development. The ultimate goal is creating a United Armenia, by unifying Armenia and Artsakh.

== Electoral record ==
The party participated in the 2015 Nagorno-Karabakh parliamentary election and won 1 seat out of 33 in the National Assembly. Hayk Khanumyan is the only MP from the party.

Election	Votes	%	Seats	Government
2015	3,709	5.38(5)	1 / 33	No

== See also ==
- List of political parties in Artsakh
