= Constitution of the Republic of Artsakh =

Supreme law of the Republic of Nagorno-Karabakh

The Constitution of the Republic of Artsakh (Armenian: Արցախի Սահմանադրություն, romanized: Arts'akhi Sahmanadrut'yun) was the basic law of the Republic of Artsakh. It was approved by the people of Artsakh in a referendum that was held on 20 February 2017. It superseded the constitution previously ratified by the people in 2006. Over 76.5% of the electorate participated in the 2017 referendum. Of these, over 90% voted for its adoption, with just under 10% voting against its adoption. This constitution proclaimed the Nagorno-Karabakh Republic to be a sovereign, democratic state that was based on social justice and the rule of law. The constitution stated that the names "Republic of Artsakh" and "Republic of Nagorno-Karabakh" were synonymous. The constitution affirmed that all power is vested in its citizens, who exercise it directly through constitutional referendums and indirectly through their elected representatives. Proposed changes to the constitution or to an alteration of the borders of the State had to be ratified by the people in a referendum. Stepanakert was defined as the state's capital. As a result of the Azerbaijani offensive, the constitution was repealed when on 28 September 2023, the president of Artsakh subsequently signed a decree to dissolve all of the republic's institutions by 1 January 2024, under article 93, bringing its existence to an end.

== Structure ==
The Constitution consisted of a preamble and 12 chapters.

The People of Artsakh,

– demonstrating a strong will to develop and defend the Republic of Nagorno-Karabakh, established on September 2, 1991, on the basis of the right to self-determination, and proclaimed independent through a referendum conducted on December 10, 1991;

– affirming faithfulness to the principles of the Declaration of State Independence of the Republic of Nagorno-Karabakh, adopted on January 6, 1992;

– highlighting the role of the Constitution adopted in 2006 in the formation and strengthening of independent statehood;

– developing the historic traditions of national statehood;

– inspired by the firm determination of the Motherland Armenia and Armenians worldwide in supporting the people of Artsakh;

– staying faithful to the dream of their ancestors to live and create freely in their homeland, and keeping alive the memory of those who perished in the struggle for freedom;

– exercising their sovereign and inalienable right;

adopt the Constitution of the Republic of Artsakh

No. of Chapter	Name of Chapter	Articles
1	The Foundations of Constitutional Order	1–22
2	Fundamental Human and Citizen's Rights and Freedoms	23–80
3	Legislative Guaranties And Main Objectives of State Policy In Economic, Social And Cultural Spheres	81–86
4	The President Of The Republic	87–105
5	The National Assembly	106–134
6	Courts And The Supreme Judicial Council	135–145
7	Prosecutor's Office	146–147
8	Local Self–Governance	148–156
9	Human Rights Defender	157–159
10	Audit Chamber	160–161
11	Adoption Of And Amendment To The Constitution, And Referendum	162–165
12	Final And Transitional Provisions	166–175

== See also ==
- Republic of Artsakh (government in exile)
- Constitution of Armenia
- Politics of Armenia
