= Free Motherland – UCA Alliance =

Free Motherland – UCA Alliance «Ազատ Հայրենիք - ՔՄԴ» դաշինք
- Leader: Arayik Harutyunyan
- Founded: 26 January 2020
- Headquarters: Stepanakert
- Ideology: Armenian nationalism
- Political position: Centre-right
- Alliance of: Free Motherland; United Civic Alliance
- National Assembly: 16 / 33 (48%)

The Free Motherland – UCA Alliance (Armenian: «Ազատ Հայրենիք - ՔՄԴ» դաշինք, Azat Hayrenik - KMD Dashink) was a political alliance in Artsakh formed by the Free Motherland and United Civic Alliance parties. The alliance was formed in January 2020, prior to the 2020 Artsakhian general election. The leader of the alliance is Arayik Harutyunyan.

== Composition ==
The alliance is composed of the following parties:

Party	Leader
Free Motherland	Arayik Harutyunyan
United Civic Alliance Party	Aram Harutyunyan

In addition, the alliance was supported and endorsed by the Artsakh Freedom Party, Movement 88, and the Armenakan Party. The Artsakh Republican Party also endorsed Harutyunyan.

== Electoral record ==
=== General elections ===
Election	Votes	%	Seats	Position	Government
2020	29,688	40.43	16 / 33	1st	Government

== See also ==
- List of political parties in Artsakh
- Politics of Artsakh
