= 2007 Nagorno-Karabakh presidential election =

Presidential elections were held in the Nagorno-Karabakh Republic on 19 July 2007. Incumbent president Arkady Ghukasyan was constitutionally barred from seeking a third term and endorsed Bako Sahakyan, who was the head of the National Security Service. Sahakyan was supported by the ruling Democratic Party of Artsakh, two opposition parties and the Armenian government.

Sahakyan's main challenger was considered to be Deputy Foreign Minister Masis Mayilyan. Parliament deputy Armen Abgaryan, Communist Party of Artsakh leader Hrant Melkumyan, and Vanya Avanesyan, a professor at Artsakh State University, were also candidates.

== Results ==
| Candidate | Party | Votes | % |
|---|---|---|---|
| Bako Sahakyan | Independent | 59,326 | 85.12 |
| Masis Mayilyan | Independent | 8,734 | 12.53 |
| Armen Abgaryan | Independent | 867 | 1.24 |
| Hrant Melkumyan | Communist Party | 554 | 0.79 |
| Vanya Avanesyan | Independent | 212 | 0.30 |
| Total | | 69,693 | 100.00 |
| Valid votes | | 69,693 | 97.77 |
| Invalid/blank votes | | 1,593 | 2.23 |
| Total votes | | 71,286 | 100.00 |
| Registered voters/turnout | | 92,114 | 77.39 |
Source: CEC

== International reactions ==
Numerous international organizations such as the UN, the EU, NATO, the Council of Europe, the OSCE did not recognize the legitimacy of the elections. The Portuguese presidency of the Council of the EU stated that despite their position, the elections "should not have any impact on the peaceful settlement of the Nagorno-Karabakh conflict. Furthermore, the EU recalls that refugees and internally-displaced persons should be given the right to a safe, secure and dignified return of their homes in order to fully participate in electoral acts."

Similarly, the chair of the Council of Europe’s Committee of Ministers stated that it "reiterates its full support to the OSCE Minsk Group and its Co-Chairmen in their efforts towards a settlement of the Nagorno Karabakh conflict. It notes with concern that conducting such “elections”, thus pre-empting the outcome of the ongoing negotiations, cannot contribute to the resolution of the conflict. It calls on all parties concerned to intensify their efforts to find a peaceful solution to the conflict, in accordance with the commitment undertaken by Armenia and Azerbaijan upon accession to the Council of Europe."

== Aftermath ==
Sahakyan was sworn in on 7 September 2007.
