= Vitaly Balasanyan =

Artsakh politician (born 1959)

- Վիտալի Բալասանյան
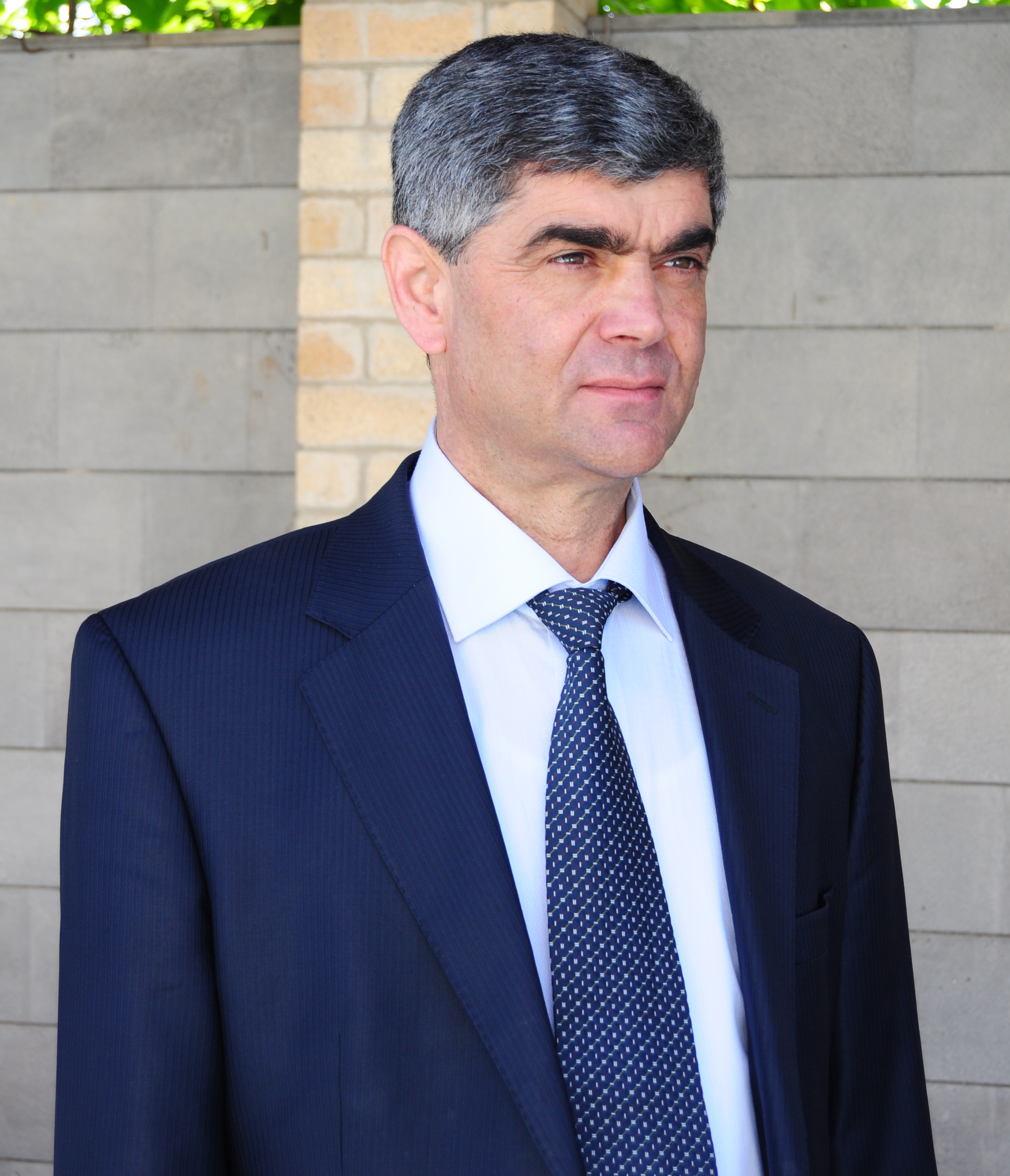
- Balasanyan in 2012
- Born: 5 March 1959 (age 67); Askeran, NKAO, Azerbaijan SSR, Soviet Union
- Military career
- Allegiance: Artsakh
- Branch: Artsakh Defense Army
- Service years: 1990—2005
- Rank: Major General
- Commands: Artsakh Defense Army
- Conflicts: First Nagorno-Karabakh War: Battle of Aghdam; Operation Kalbajar
- Awards: Hero of Artsakh; Order of the Combat Cross (1st degree)

Vitaly Mikhaili Balasanyan (Armenian: Վիտալի Միխայիլի Բալասանյան, born 5 March 1959) is an Artsakhi politician and retired general. He served as the head of the Security Council of the self-proclaimed Republic of Artsakh from November 2016 to November 2019 and again from December 2020 to January 2023. For his services in the First Nagorno-Karabakh War, he was awarded the country's highest title, Hero of Artsakh. He previously served as a member of Artsakh's National Assembly. He twice ran, unsuccessfully, for the office of President of Artsakh.

== Early life and career ==
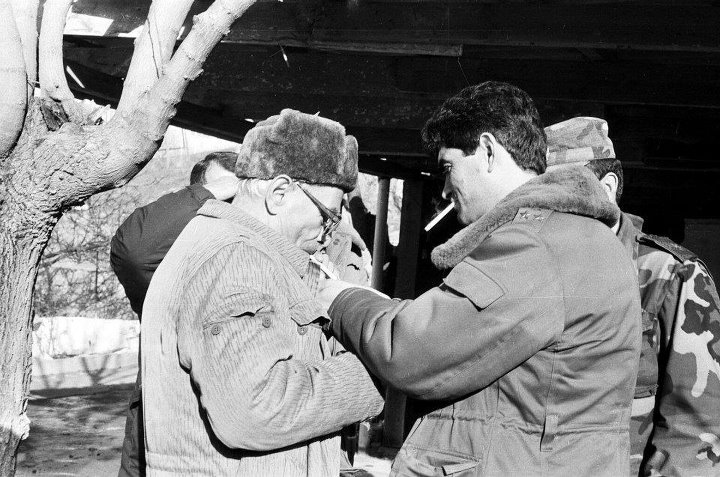
Vitaly Balasanyan (right) with Kristapor Ivanyan

From 1977 to 1979 he served in the Soviet Army and subsequently lived and worked in his native Askeran. In February 1988, Balasanyan participated in the first violent incident of the Karabakh conflict known as the Askeran clash, when a large group of Azerbaijanis attempted to march from Aghdam to Stepanakert, but was stopped at Askeran with fights breaking out.

In 1990 Balasanyan was elected commander of Askeran region's self-defense and in December 1991 member of the Supreme Council of the self-proclaimed Republic of Artsakh. He led the defense of Askeran between 1992 and 1993. In June–July 1993 he was a key commander in the Battle of Aghdam and subsequent fighting as commander of the Askeran defense district. In 1997, Balasanyan became the first commander of the newly established Martakert mountain-rifle division and in 1999 promoted to deputy minister of defense of the self-proclaimed Republic of Artsakh in charge of veterans' affairs. Balasanyan earned the rank of major general in 2000 and in 2002 became the 8th person to be awarded the title of Hero of Artsakh.

== Post-military ==
Balasanyan retired from the military in 2005 and was elected to the National Assembly of the self-proclaimed Republic of Artsakh as a candidate for the Armenian Revolutionary Federation-Dashnaktsutyun. From 2007 to 2010 he was an Adviser to the President of Artsakh Bako Sahakyan and was re-elected to parliament in 2010. In 2011 he received a degree from the Armenian State University of Economics.

In 2012, Balasanyan was the main challenger to Bako Sahakyan in the 2012 NKR Presidential Elections. He received some 33 percent of the vote. Balasanyan was re-elected to parliament for the fourth time in 2015.

After the start of 2016 Armenian–Azerbaijani clashes he helped coordinate Armenian defense in Askeran direction, where he was previously a commander, rising to social media prominence after a series of interviews. Balasanyan was a presidential candidate in the 2020 Artsakhian general election. He finished third with 7.98% of the vote.

=== Security Council ===
In November 2016, Balasanyan was appointed secretary of the National Security Council of the Republic of Artsakh. President Bako Sahakyan dismissed him from his post in November 2019.

On 2 December 2020, in the aftermath of the 2020 Nagorno-Karabakh War, President Harutyunyan appointed Balasanyan to the office of Secretary of the National Security Council. On 16 December, the President announced that all security-related decisions would have to be approved by the Security Council․ Balasanyan announced a number of reforms, including the subordination of Artsakh's armed forces to the Security Council and the closing of religious organizations not related to the Armenian Apostolic Church. He also stated that the Republic of Artsakh would recover by diplomatic means the parts of the Askeran and Hadrut regions lost in the 2020 Nagorno-Karabakh War. Since taking the post of Secretary of the Security Council, he has occasionally been referred to in the Armenian press as the de facto leader of Artsakh.

Balasanyan was dismissed from the office on 7 January 2023 and replaced by Ararat Melkumyan.

== Legal issues ==
In February 2023, a month after Balasanyan's dismissal from the office of head of the National Security Council, the general prosecutor's office of Artsakh announced that a criminal case had been initiated "involving" Balasanyan, without revealing the charges or whether Balasanyan himself was being charged. On 14 July 2023, Balasanyan was arrested from his home in Askeran on charges of committing violence against a representative of the government. He was released three days later.

== Criticism ==
Balasanyan has been criticized for his alleged Russian patronage, as well as his harsh treatment of journalists.

== Awards ==
Country	Award
Artsakh	Order of the Combat Cross of the First Degree
Artsakh	Hero of Artsakh
