= President of Artsakh =

Head of state and government of the de facto republic

President of the Republic of Artsakh
- Արցախի հանրապետության նախագահ (Armenian); Президент Нагорно-Карабахской Республики (Russian)
- Coat of arms of Artsakh
- Incumbent; Vacant since 2 July 2026
- Status: Head of state Head of government
- Residence: Presidential Palace
- Seat: Stepanakert
- Appointer: Direct popular vote
- Term length: 5 years, renewable once
- Inaugural holder: Robert Kocharyan
- Formation: 29 December 1994
- Website: president.nkr.am (defunct)

The president of the Republic of Artsakh (Armenian: Արցախի Հանրապետության նախագահ, Russian: Президент Нагорно-Карабахской Республики) is the head of state and head of government of the government-in-exile of the once de facto Republic of Artsakh.

In a constitutional referendum held in 2017, citizens of the republic voted in favor of adopting a presidential system of governance.

Arayik Harutyunyan was elected president in the 2020 Artsakhian general election. He resigned on 1 September 2023. On 9 September 2023, Samvel Shahramanyan was elected president by Artsakh's parliament to replace Harutyunyan.

Following the Azerbaijani offensive on 19 September 2023, Artsakh agreed to dissolve itself by 1 January 2024, however instead of dissolving, they established a government-in-exile in Yerevan, Armenia presided by Samvel Shahramanyan. The prime minister of Armenia, Nikol Pashinyan, has since severely opposed the government-in-exile's existence in Armenia.

== Constitutional powers ==
The constitution granted significant power to the president who controls the executive branch, represented the state abroad and appointed the ministers. The president was also the commander-in-chief of the Artsakh Defence Army and had the right to appoint and dismiss the supreme command of the armed forces and other troops.

Article 93 of the former constitution outlined functions of the president:

1. Shall administer the domestic and foreign policies of the State;
2. Shall exercise general management of the bodies of the state administration system;
3. Shall define the structure and rules of operation of the Government and other state bodies;
4. Shall appoint and dismiss the state minister and ministers;
5. Shall administer state property and finances;
6. Shall make appointments to the state positions, in cases prescribed by law;
7. May form advisory bodies;
8. Shall represent the Republic of Artsakh in international relations, sign international treaties, present international agreements to the National Assembly for ratification and sign their ratification forms, approve, suspend or revoke the international agreements not requiring ratification;
9. Shall appoint and recall the diplomatic representatives of the Republic of Artsakh to foreign countries and international organizations; receive the credentials and letters of recall of diplomatic representatives of foreign states and international organizations;
10. May issue decree on not holding elections and referendum during martial law;
11. May dissolve the National Assembly except for one-year period following the opening of the first parliamentary session, in times of war and emergency as well as when he/she, during martial law, has issued a decree on not holding elections;
12. Shall apply to the President of the National Assembly with a proposal to convene a special session or sitting of the National Assembly;
13. Shall submit the Draft State Budget to the National Assembly;
14. Shall have the right to legislative initiative;
15. Shall apply to the National Assembly with a recommendation of amnesty;
16. May deliver an address to the people and the National Assembly;
17. Shall submit to the National Assembly an annual communication on the implementation progress and results of his/her Program of previous year and on the Program of following year;
18. Shall propose to the National Assembly a candidate for the Prosecutor General; at the recommendation of the Prosecutor General, shall appoint and dismiss the Deputy Prosecutor Generals;
19. Shall appoint one member-lawyer of the Supreme Judicial Council;
20. In the event of a natural disaster or other emergency situations, shall take measures appropriate to the situation and address the people on that matter; if necessary, shall declare state of emergency;
21. Shall decorate with orders and medals of the Republic of Artsakh and confere the highest military and honorary titles, the highest diplomatic and other class ranks;
22. Shall decide on the issue of granting pardon to convicts under the procedure prescribed by law;
23. Shall, in the cases and under the procedure prescribed by law, decide on issues in respect of granting and terminating citizenship of the Republic of Artsakh;
24. Shall adopt normative and individual legal acts: such as decrees and executive orders.

== Election ==
=== Requirements ===
The Constitution of Artsakh requires that the president should be at least 35-years-old, being a citizen of only of the Republic of Artsakh for the preceding ten years and having resided permanently only in Artsakh at least preceding ten years.

=== Term limits ===
The president is elected for a five-year term and could be reelected only once. It was revealed, however, that the National Assembly of Artsakh had made an amendment to the constitution to extend Samvel Shahramanyan's term for one month, to "preserve the legal framework of the republic and safeguard the continuity of its institutions".

== Office of the President ==
The Office of the President was located in Building 3, February 20 Street in Stepanakert.

== List of heads of state (1992–present) ==
=== Chairmen of the Supreme Council (1992–1994) ===
No.	Portrait	Name (Birth–Death)	Term of office			Political party
No.	Portrait	Name (Birth–Death)	Took office	Left office	Time in office	Political party
1	Artur Mkrtchyan	Artur Mkrtchyan (1959–1992)	7 January 1992	14 April 1992 †	98 days	ARF
–	Georgi Petrosian	Georgi Petrosian (born 1952); Acting	15 April 1992	14 June 1993	1 year, 60 days	ARF
–	Karen Baburyan [hy]	Karen Baburyan (1954–2011); Acting	14 June 1993	29 December 1994	1 year, 198 days	Independent

=== Presidents (1994-present) ===
==== Presidents of the Republic (1994–2023) ====
No.	Portrait	Name (Birth–Death)	Term of office			Political party	Elected
No.	Portrait	Name (Birth–Death)	Took office	Left office	Time in office	Political party	Elected
1	Robert Kocharyan	Robert Kocharyan (born 1954)	29 December 1994	20 March 1997	2 years, 81 days	Independent	1996
–	Leonard Petrosyan	Leonard Petrosyan (1952–1999 (Note: Assassinated in the 1999 Armenian parliament shooting.)); Acting	20 March 1997	8 September 1997	172 days	Independent	–
2	Arkadi Ghukasyan	Arkadi Ghukasyan (born 1957)	8 September 1997	7 September 2007	10 years	Independent	1997; 2002
3	Bako Sahakyan	Bako Sahakyan (born 1960)	7 September 2007	21 May 2020	12 years, 257 days	Independent	2007; 2012; 2017
4	Arayik Harutyunyan	Arayik Harutyunyan (born 1973)	21 May 2020	1 September 2023	3 years, 103 days	Free Motherland	2020
–	Davit Ishkhanyan	Davit Ishkhanyan (born 1968); Acting	1 September 2023	10 September 2023	9 days	ARF	–
5	Samvel Shahramanyan	Samvel Shahramanyan (born 1978)	10 September 2023	1 October 2023	21 days	Independent	2023

==== Presidents-in-exile (2023-present) ====
No.	Portrait	Name (Birth–Death)	Term of office			Political party	Elected
No.	Portrait	Name (Birth–Death)	Took office	Left office	Time in office	Political party	Elected
5	Samvel Shahramanyan	Samvel Shahramanyan (born 1978)	1 October 2023	21 May 2025	1 year, 232 days	Independent	2023
–	Ashot Danielyan	Ashot Danielyan (born 1974); Acting	21 May 2025	Incumbent	1 year, 134 days	Independent	–

== Latest election ==
Candidate	Party	Votes	%
Samvel Shahramanyan	Independent (Note: Nominated by Free Motherland - UCA Alliance, Justice, Armenian Revolutionary Federation and Democratic Party of Artsakh factions)	22	95.65
Against		1	4.35
Total		23	100.00
Valid votes		23	100.00
Invalid/blank votes		0	0.00
Total votes		23	100.00
Registered voters/turnout		33	69.70
Source: National Assembly

== See also ==
- Prime Minister of the Nagorno-Karabakh Republic
- State Minister of Artsakh
- President of the National Assembly of Artsakh
