= Generation of Independence Party =

Generation of Independence Party Անկախության սերունդ
- Leader: Vanik Chaloyan
- Founded: 2021
- Headquarters: Yerevan, Armenia
- Ideology: Youth politics Socialism

Website
- Facebook page

The Generation of Independence Party (Armenian: Անկախության սերունդ) is an Armenian political party. The party was founded on 30 April 2021, and is led by Vanik Chaloyan.

== History ==
The party was founded during the 2020–2021 Armenian protests and does not maintain any political representation within the National Assembly. The party currently acts as an extra-parliamentary force. The party had confirmed its intentions to participate in the 2021 Armenian parliamentary elections, but ultimately failed to register.

== Ideology ==
The party seeks to build a strong state based on national ideology and state interests. The party's primary focus, however, is to create new opportunities for youth. The party believes in creating opportunities for development within the economic, education, science, cultural, and agriculture sectors in order to reduce the emigration of Armenia's youth.

== Activities ==
On 3 May 2021, the party held a joint conference with the Hanrapetutyun Party. Both parties touched upon the ongoing political crisis in Armenia.

On 5 May 2021, the party organized a meeting with the For The Republic Party, the parties discussed various issues facing the country.

On 7 May 2021, party members met with representatives of the Sovereign Armenia Party, political issues and potential cooperation was discussed.

On 11 May 2021, party leaders met with the Sasna Tsrer Pan-Armenian Party to discuss political events and challenges in Armenia.

== See also ==
- Programs of political parties in Armenia
