= Armenian nationalism =

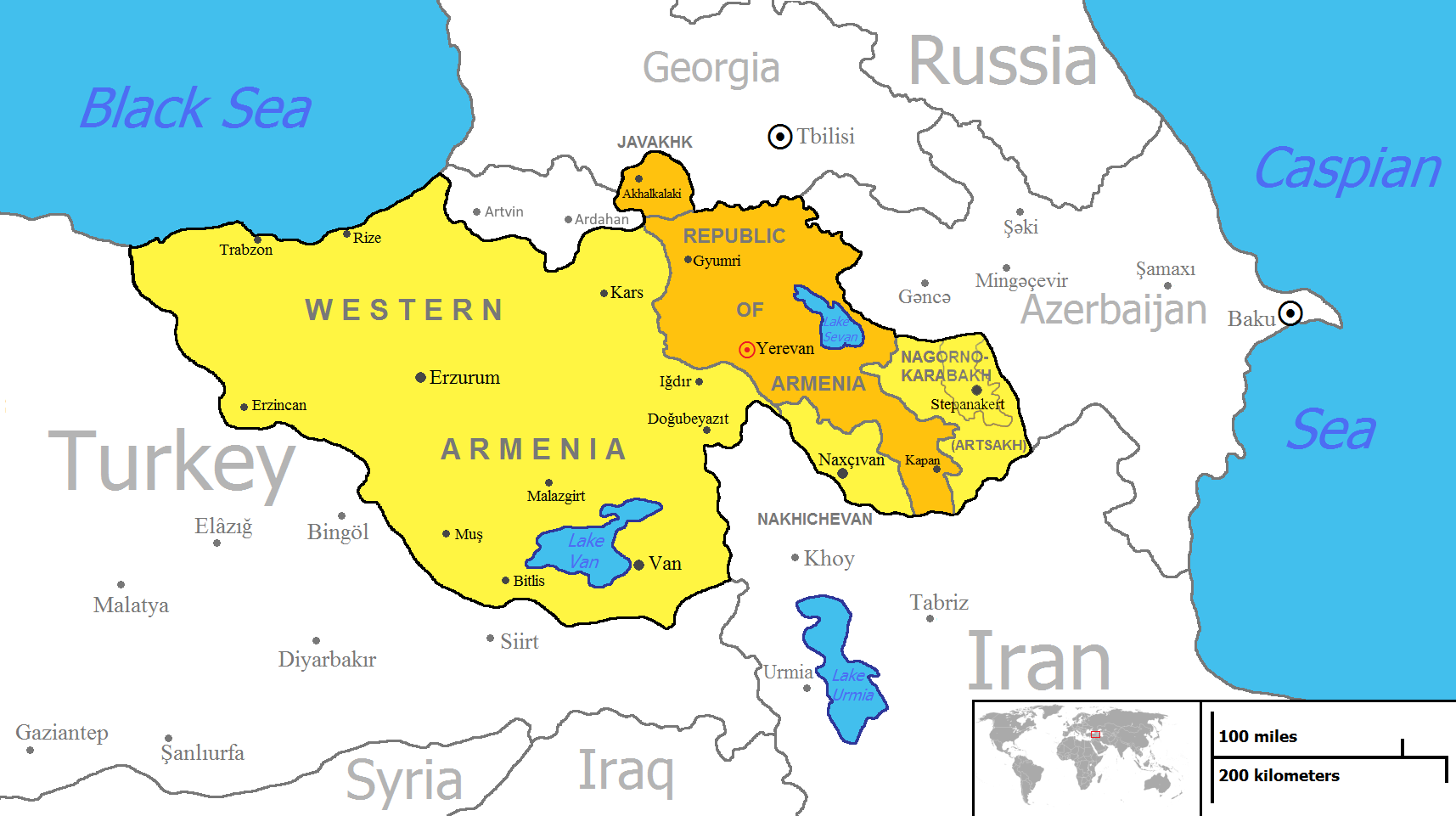
The modern concept of the United Armenia as used by the Armenian Revolutionary Federation (Dashnaktsutyun) is being seen as the most prominent example of modern Armenian nationalism.

Armenian nationalism in the modern period has its roots in the romantic nationalism of Mikayel Chamchian (1738–1823) and generally defined as the creation of a free, independent and united Armenia formulated as the Armenian Cause (Հայ Դատ Hay Dat). Armenian national awakening developed in the 1880s in the context of the general rise of nationalism under the Ottoman Empire. The Russian Armenia followed with significant causes. The Armenian Apostolic Church has been a great defender of Armenian nationalism, with leaders like Khrimian Hayrik who devoted his life to the peasantry. The establishment of modern Armenia (1991) and Armenian social fabric becoming more complex gradually decrease the political influence of Hye Dat and shifted towards a modern Armenian nationalism modeled as a liberal nationalism.

== National awakening ==
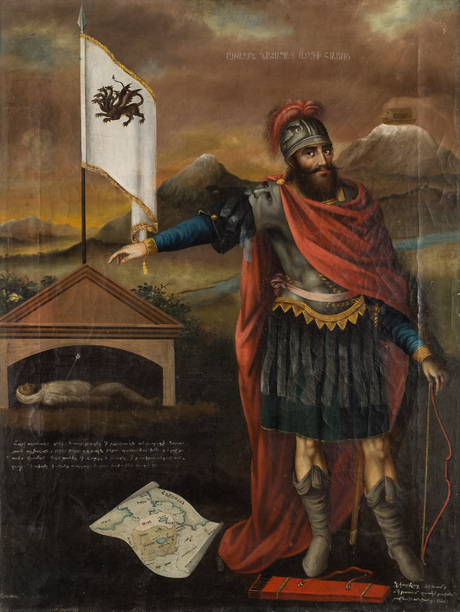
"Hayk" by Mkrtum Hovnatanian (1779–1846). The legendary founder of the Armenian nation, standing next to the tomb of Bel, with Hayk's arrow still in Bel's chest. The map depicts the Lake Van region and Mount Ararat, with Noah's ark.

The situation of the non-Muslim minorities within the Ottoman Empire changed substantially as a result of reforms introduced during the Tanzimat era. The early reforms were generally addressed at changing the organisation of, and systems within, the Ottoman Empire as a whole. However, as a result of diplomatic pressures exerted by the Great Powers that had supported the Ottoman Empire against Russia during the Crimean War, in 1856 reforms were made that sought to give non-Muslims citizens of the Ottoman Empire the same rights as Muslim citizens. The capitation tax on non-Muslims was abolished, non-Muslims were allowed to become soldiers, and schools for the non-Muslim communities were allowed to open.

Under these new and relatively liberal conditions, many Armenian schools were opened throughout the Ottoman Empire. The majority of these schools quickly acquired a secular aspect. The Armenians also established numerous cultural associations to set a minimum standard for the curricula and qualifications for the teachers. In 1880 these associations united together as the "General Union of Armenian Schools".

After the defeat of the Ottoman Empire in the Russo-Turkish War of 1877-78, the Armenian National Assembly and Patriarch Nerses II of Constantinople sent Catholicos Mgrdich Khrimian to the Congress of Berlin to represent the Armenians in the debate on the Armenian Question. In his famous patriotic speech "The Paper Ladle" Mgrdich Khrimian advised Armenians to take the national awakening of Bulgaria as a model as the hopes of the Armenian people for self-determination.

Article 61 of the Berlin Congress mentioned the possibility of an "autonomous Armenia", transforming the "Armenian Question" from an internal problem of the Ottoman Empire into an international one. In the treaty, Ottoman Turkey undertook to protect its Armenian subjects from oppression and violence. However, the treaty did not provide any instruments to force Turkey to make reforms. Both Turkey and Russia began to look upon all expressions of Armenian national identity, however innocent, as possible instruments for the realisation of that autonomy.

== Role of ancient history ==
Armenians are the original inhabitants of much of the territory of historic Armenia, and the Turks cannot claim presence in Anatolia prior to the Seljuk conquests of the 11th century. The suggestion that the Armenians had also been newcomers to the region, even if 1500 years earlier than the Turks, might rise, within the logic of ethnic nationalism, the possibility that Turkish and Armenian claims to the territory were "morally equal". Identification with the distant glories of Urartu and its prehistoric forerunners can be used to reassert Armenian "indigeneity" and "compensate for modern miseries", and together with Mount Ararat has come to be a powerful symbol of Armenian ethnicity especially among the second generation diaspora (Redgate 1995).

As a consequence, essentialist interpretations of Armenian ethnicity over the ages abound in Armenian historiography, and flourished particularly during the Soviet era, with examples such as S. A. Sardarian's Pervobytnoye obshchestvo v Amenii of 1967 which besides "numerous plagiarisms and mistakes" goes as far as to postulate a separate Armenian race native to the Armenian plateau, and attributes the invention of metallurgy to the Armenians (Kohl and Tsetskhladze 1995). Heavily slanted depictions of Urartu are common in this literature. There are reasonable scholarly scenarios that there was a Proto-Armenian component in Urartu, and that the early Armenians were the bona fide cultural heirs to Urartu, but the essentialist view of Armenian nationhood that simply equates Urartu with Armenia cannot be sustained (Kohl and Tsetskhladze 1995).

== Russian Armenia ==
In the Russian Empire, attempts were made to reduce the powers and privileges of Etchmiadzin, to influence the election of the Catholicos, and the study of Armenian history and culture was actively discouraged. In the Ottoman Empire, subjects such as the history of Armenia were banned at Armenian schools. In response, such subjects often continued to be taught in secret, creating further suspicion in the eyes of the Ottoman authorities. Images that depicted scenes from Armenian history were forbidden to be sold or be displayed in public. Armenian newspapers also began to be either closed down or to be heavily censored. In the 1890s many Armenian schools were closed down, and in 1893 the "General Union of Armenian Schools" was abolished. Many teachers at Armenian schools were specifically targeted and killed in Ottoman Empire during the Hamidian massacre.

== Armenian genocide ==
The fate of the Armenians took a worse course within the Ottoman Empire, with World War I followed by the Armenian genocide, in which up to 1,500,000 Armenians were killed. Following World War I, the Armenians not scattered in the Armenian diaspora found themselves after the fall of the short-lived Democratic Republic of Armenia reduced to a republic within the Soviet Union, the Armenian SSR.

== Modern times and anti-Turkism ==
A Historic Armenia was advocated by the Armenian Revolutionary Federation during Soviet times, which would incorporate Nakhchivan in Azerbaijan, and Eastern Turkey (western parts of Armenian Highland). According to Suny, Armenian nationalism in the 20th century emphasized the "ancient origin of the Armenians", and consequently embraced the Armenian hypothesis of Indo-European origins forwarded by Soviet scholars in the 1980s. During Soviet times, Armenian nationalism within Soviet Armenia was distinguished from other nationalisms of peoples absorbed into the Soviet Union, such as Georgian, Ukrainian or Estonian, in that it did not direct itself against the dominant Russians, but continued to focus on the traditional enemy, the Turks, and was consequently subtly encouraged by the communist government. For example, Saparov points out that anti-Turkism was the major direction and driving force for Armenian nationalism in Soviet Armenia. According to Ghulyan, anti-Turkism, together with the idea of the ancient origins (autochthony) of the Armenians, continued to remain as an important direction of Armenian nationalism and its various reflections in modern-day Armenia.

Armenian nationalism has notably been opposed to Turkish nationalism. According to Brannen, to the Armenian diasporic communities in the United States and Canada, historical memory of the Armenian genocide carried out by Ottoman Turks in April 1915 had become a focus around which formation of Armenian identity takes place. Armenian diasporic nationalism has a strong nostalgic component for a lost time and place, most prominently symbolized by Mount Ararat which, although visible from Yerevan, lies within Turkish territory.

Modern Armenian nationalism may also be divided by pro-European and pro-Russian sentiments. Parties like the Union for National Self-Determination and the European Party of Armenia advocate for the European integration of Armenia, while the nationalism of the Armenian Revolutionary Federation is more lax on European integration and is more focused on maintaining close ties with Russia.

== Parties ==
=== Current ===
- Armenian Democratic Liberal Party (1921–present)
- Armenian Revolutionary Federation (1890–present)
- Mighty Fatherland (1999–present)
- Hayazn (2009–present)
- Heritage (2012–present)
- National Revival (2013–present)
- Republican Party of Armenia (1990–present)
- Sasna Tsrer Pan-Armenian Party (2018–present)
- Social Democrat Hunchakian Party (1887–present)
- Union for National Self-Determination (1987–present)
- United Liberal National Party (2007–present)
- Adequate Party (2019–present)

=== Former ===
- Armenakan Party (1885–1921)
- National United Party (1966–1987)
- Pan-Armenian National Movement (1988–2013)
- Dignity, Democracy, Motherland (2003)

== See also ==
- Anti-Azerbaijani sentiment in Armenia
- Armenian Secret Army for the Liberation of Armenia
- Nairi (Armenian usages)
- Nationalism and ancient history
- Rise of nationalism under the Ottoman Empire
- Tseghakronism
- United Armenia
- Western Armenia Government in Exile
