= Bako Sahakyan =

3rd President of Artsakh

- Բակո Սահակյան
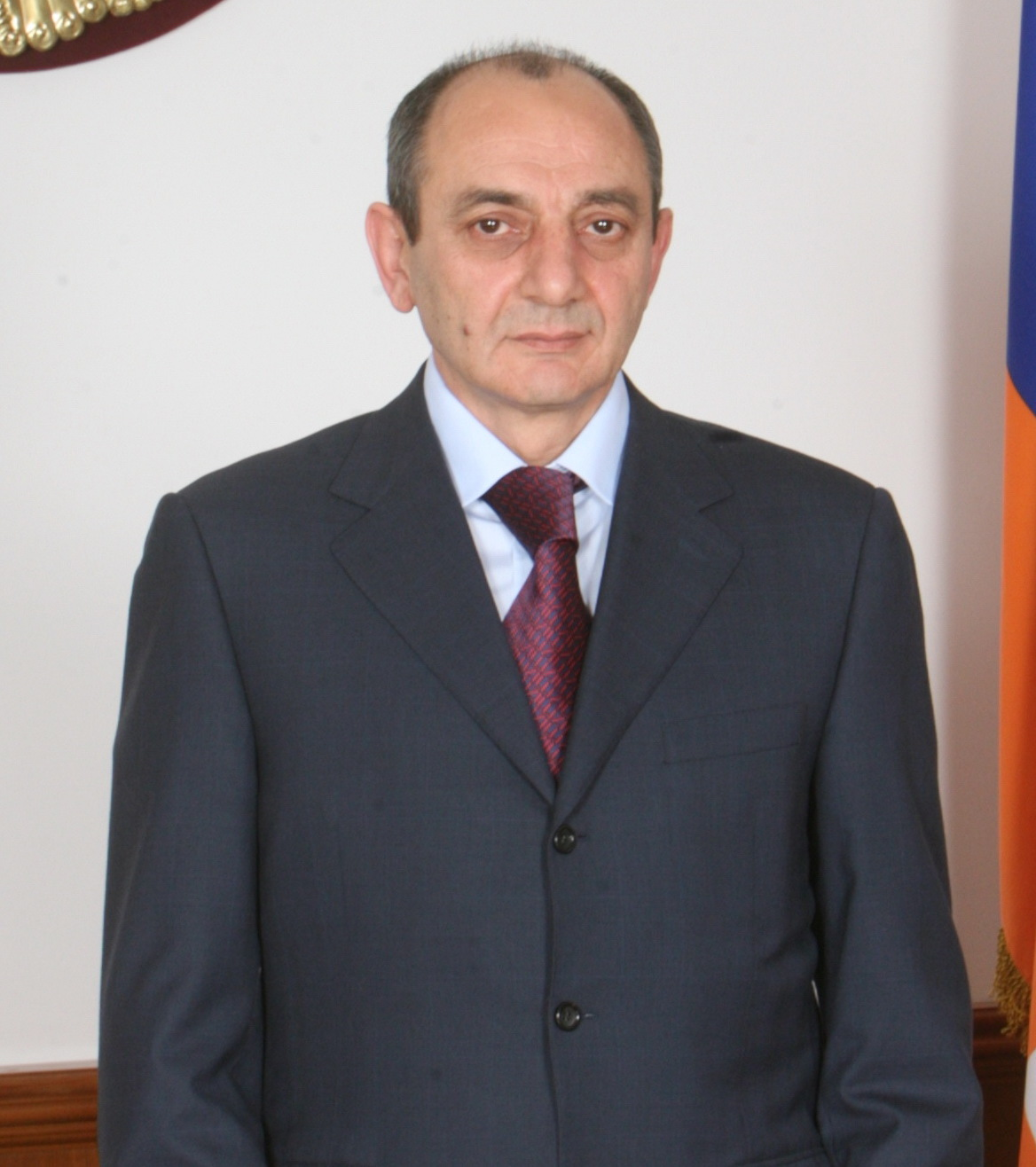
- Sahakyan in 2008

3rd President of Artsakh
- In office 7 September 2007 – 21 May 2020
- Prime Minister: Anushavan Danielyan; Arayik Harutyunyan
- Preceded by: Arkadi Ghukasyan
- Succeeded by: Arayik Harutyunyan

Interior Minister of Nagorno-Karabakh
- In office 1999–2001
- President: Arkadi Ghukasyan

Personal details
- Born: 30 August 1960 (age 66) Stepanakert, Nagorno-Karabakh Autonomous Oblast, Azerbaijan SSR, Soviet Union
- Party: Independent
- Education: Artsakh University

Military service
- Branch/service: Soviet Army; Artsakh Defence Army
- Years of service: 1978-1980; 1990–2007
- Rank: Colonel General
- Battles/wars: First Nagorno-Karabakh War

Bako Sahaki Sahakyan (Note: Sometimes transcribed as Sahakian or Saakian.) (Armenian: Բակո Սահակի Սահակյան; born 30 August 1960) is an Armenian politician who served as the third president of the de facto-independent Republic of Artsakh from 2007 to 2020. He was the longest-serving president of Artsakh.

He was first elected as president on 19 July 2007. On 19 July 2012, he was re-elected for a second five-year term, receiving approximately two-thirds of the votes. In 2017, he was re-elected indirectly for a three-year term. Sahakyan replaced Arkadi Ghukasyan, who had held the presidential post for two five-year terms.

On October 3, 2023, Azerbaijan detained Bako Sahakyan from the territory of Artsakh, and since that moment he has been held in Baku in captivity.

== Early life ==
Sahakyan was born on 30 August 1960 in Stepanakert, the capital of the Nagorno-Karabakh Autonomous Oblast within the Azerbaijan SSR. After serving in the Soviet Army, he worked for nine years in a Stepanakert factory. In 1990, he joined the Nagorno-Karabakh Defense Army, of which he became a deputy commander.

== Career ==
In 1999, he was named interior minister of Nagorno-Karabakh. He also led the Nagorno-Karabakh security service from 2001 to June 2007, when he resigned in order to run in the 2007 Nagorno-Karabakh presidential election.

== President of Artsakh ==
Sahakyan ran as an independent and won the elections with 85 percent of the votes. Voters mainly turned to Sahakyan because of his record in the security services. He pledged to seek full independence for Artsakh, using the example of international recognition of Kosovo as an independent state, which he said would pave the way for acceptance of Artsakh's sovereignty. He was re-elected for a second five-year term in 2012 and then indirectly by Artsakh's National Assembly in 2017 for a three-year term. He was succeeded by Arayik Harutyunyan, who previously served as Sahakyan's prime minister, in 2020.

== Arrest and trial ==
On 3 October 2023, he and two other former presidents of Artsakh, Arkadi Ghukasyan and Arayik Harutyunyan, together with former president of the National Assembly Davit Ishkhanyan, were detained by the State Security Service of Azerbaijan and brought to Baku.

On 5 February 2026, an Azerbaijan military court sentenced Sahakyan to 20 years of imprisonment on charges such as "waging an aggressive war" and "violent seizure of power".

== Personal life ==
Sahakyan is married and has two children.

== Notes ==
Political offices
Preceded by Arkadi Ghukasyan	President of Artsakh; 2007–2020	Succeeded by Arayik Harutyunyan
