= National Assembly (Artsakh) =

Legislature of the Republic of Artsakh

National Assembly Ազգային ժողով Azgayin Zhoghov
- 7th convocation of the National Assembly

Type
- Type: Unicameral

History
- Founded: 28 November 1991

Leadership
- President: Ashot Danielyan, Free Motherland since 21 May 2025
- Vice-President: Gagik Baghunts, United Motherland since 21 May 2020

Structure
- Seats: 33
- Political groups: Government (16): Free Motherland - UCA Alliance (16); Free Motherland (16); UCA Party (0); Supported by (8): ARF (3); Justice (2); Democratic Party (2); Independents (1); Opposition (9): United Motherland (9)
- Authority: in exile since 2024

Elections
- Voting system: Party-list proportional representation
- First election: 28 December 1991 and 4 January 1992
- Last election: 31 March 2020

Meeting place
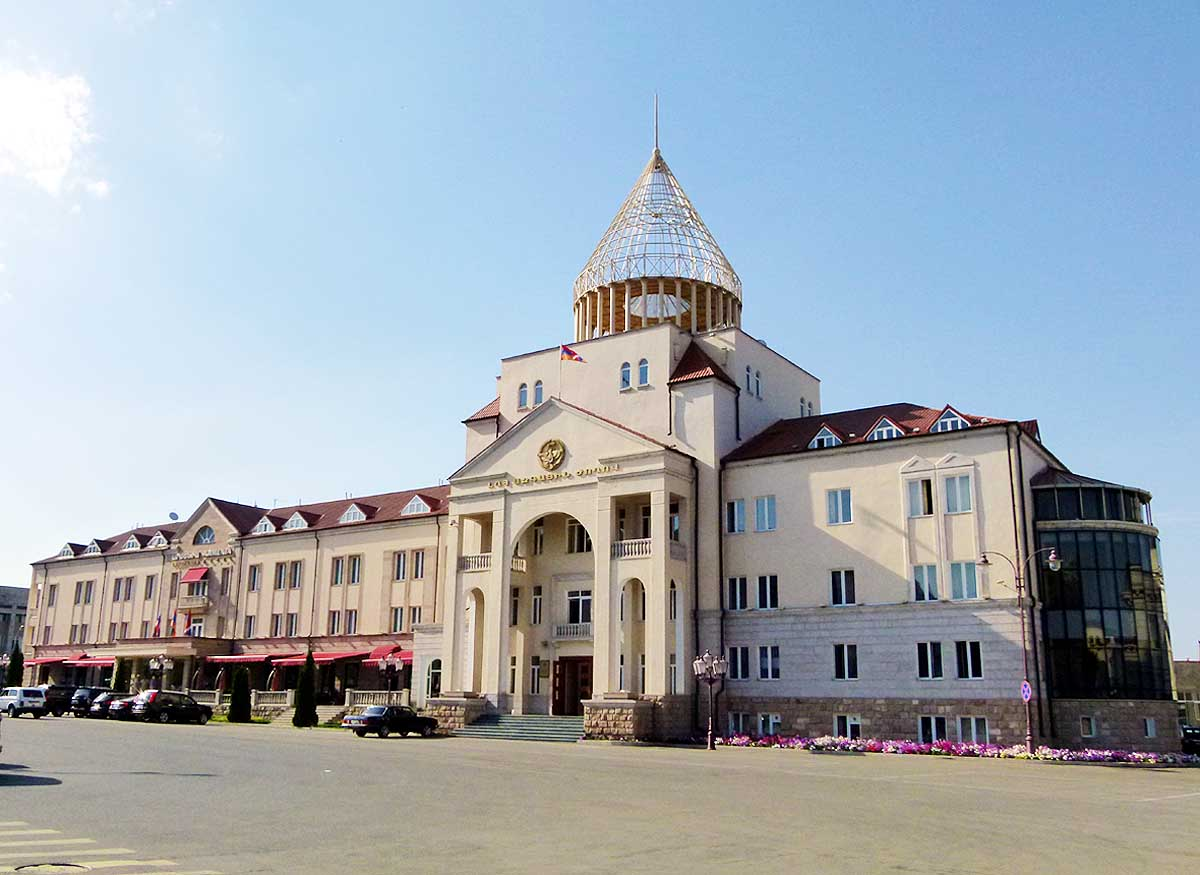
- 2, 20 February st., Stepanakert

Website
- http://www.nankr.am/en

The National Assembly of the Republic of Artsakh (Armenian: Արցախի Հանրապետության Ազգային ժողով, romanized: Artsakhi Hanrapetut'yan Azgayin zhoghov; often shortened: Ազգային ժողով, ԱԺ, Azgayin zhoghov, AZh) was the legislative branch of the government of the Republic of Artsakh and has been in exile in Armenia since late 2023.

== Status ==
Following the Azerbaijani offensive on 19 September 2023, Artsakh president Samvel Shahramanyan issued a decree to dissolve the Republic by 1 January 2024. However, this decision was subsequently declared not valid in December 2023 by Shahramanyan. The Assembly kept functioning in exile from Yerevan. In April 2025 it adopted a constitutional amendment to preserve the office of the president, by prolonging Shahramanyan's term. The option to hold new elections was dismissed, due to depopulation of the region and the collapsed institutions.

== Assembly ==
Plans were in place to move the National Assembly from Stepanakert to Shusha on 9 May 2022 to mark the 30th anniversary of the capture of Shusha, but the city came under the control of Azerbaijan during the Second Nagorno-Karabakh War.

In early March 2024, Azerbaijani authorities demolished the building of the National Assembly of Artsakh.

== Electoral system ==
The constitution of Artsakh, amended in 2017, stated that all members to National Assembly shall be elected for a five-year term through a proportional electoral system. The National Assembly had to be composed of no less than 27 and no more than 33 MPs. The number of the MPs had to be defined by the Electoral Code.

Prior to the passing of the 2017 constitutional referendum, the National Assembly had 33 members, 22 of whom (17 before 2015) were elected using party-list proportional representation, and the rest elected in single seat constituencies using first-past-the-post voting.

== Last election ==
Party	Votes	%	Seats	+/–
Free Motherland - UCA Alliance	30,015	40.80	16	+1
United Motherland	17,683	24.04	9	New
Justice	5,867	7.98	3	New
Armenian Revolutionary Federation	4,758	6.47	3	–4
Democratic Party of Artsakh	4,314	5.86	2	–4
New Artsakh Alliance	3,385	4.60	0	New
National Revival	2,175	2.96	0	0
Artsakh Conservative Party	2,156	2.93	0	New
Artsakh Revolutionary Party	1,325	1.80	0	New
United Armenia Party	930	1.26	0	New
Generation of Independence Party	551	0.75	0	New
Communist Party of Artsakh	402	0.55	0	0
Total	73,561	100.00	33	0
Valid votes	73,561	96.82		
Invalid/blank votes	2,419	3.18		
Total votes	75,980	100.00		
Registered voters/turnout	104,866	72.45		
Source: CEC, Armenanews

== Committees ==
The National Assembly had 7 standing committees:

- Standing Committee on Defense, Security and Law Enforcement
- Standing Committee on Foreign Relations
- Standing Committee on State and Legal Affairs
- Standing Committee on Social Affairs and Health
- Standing Committee on Production and Manufacturing Infrastructure
- Standing Committee on Budget, Financial and Economic Management
- Standing Committee on Science, Education, Culture, Youth and Sports,

== List of National Assembly members by convocation ==
=== 6th Convocation ===
The members of the 6th convocation of the National Assembly were elected on 3 May 2015.

Party	Name
Free Motherland (14)	Artur Tovmasyan (head of faction)
Free Motherland (14)	Ramela Dadayan (secretary of faction)
Free Motherland (14)	Arpat Avanesyan
Free Motherland (14)	Aram Grigoryan
Free Motherland (14)	Grigory Kasparyan
Free Motherland (14)	Sergey Harutyunyan
Free Motherland (14)	Rudik Hyusnunts
Free Motherland (14)	Robert Ghahramanyan
Free Motherland (14)	Arzik Mkhitaryan
Free Motherland (14)	Vardges Ulubabyab
Free Motherland (14)	Gagik Petrosyan
Free Motherland (14)	Hovik Jivanyan
Free Motherland (14)	Ararat Ohandjanyan
Free Motherland (14)	Armen Ohanyan
Democratic Party (6)	Ashot Ghulian (Speaker of the Parliament)
Democratic Party (6)	Vardges Baghryan (head of faction)
Democratic Party (6)	Ludmila Barseghyan (secretary of faction)
Democratic Party (6)	Zhanna Galstyan
Democratic Party (6)	Davit Melkumyan
Democratic Party (6)	Gegham Stepanyan
ARF (6)	Armen Sargsyan (head of faction)
ARF (6)	Alyosha Gabrielyan (secretary of faction)
ARF (6)	Vahram Balayan
ARF (6)	David Ishkhanyan
ARF (6)	Rita Mnatsakanyan
ARF (6)	Georgy Petrosyan
Movement 88 (3)	Eduard Aghabekyan (head of faction)
Movement 88 (3)	Gagik Baghunts (secretary of faction)
Movement 88 (3)	Vilen Safaryan
National Revival (1)	Hayk Khanumyan (head of faction)
Independent (3)	Ruslan Israelyan (Note: Ruslan Israelyan left Free Motherland faction in June 2018)
Independent (3)	Aram Sargsyan
Independent (3)	Erik Harutunyan
Source: National Assembly of the Republic of Artsakh

=== 7th Convocation ===
The members of the 7th convocation of the National Assembly were elected on 31 March 2020. This was the last legislature before the dissolution of Artsakh on 1 January 2024.

Faction	Name
Free Motherland - UCA Alliance (16)	Arthur Tovmasyan (President of the National Assembly)
Free Motherland - UCA Alliance (16)	Arthur Harutyunyan (head of faction)
Free Motherland - UCA Alliance (16)	Eleonora Avanesyan (secretary of faction)
Free Motherland - UCA Alliance (16)	Eduard Aghabekyan
Free Motherland - UCA Alliance (16)	Aram Grigoryan
Free Motherland - UCA Alliance (16)	Hovik Jivanyan
Free Motherland - UCA Alliance (16)	Vladimir Kasyan
Free Motherland - UCA Alliance (16)	Arevik Petrosyan
Free Motherland - UCA Alliance (16)	Karine Atayan
Free Motherland - UCA Alliance (16)	Aramayis Aghabekyan
Free Motherland - UCA Alliance (16)	Areg Avagyan
Free Motherland - UCA Alliance (16)	Nela Grigoryan
Free Motherland - UCA Alliance (16)	Ashot Danielyan
Free Motherland - UCA Alliance (16)	Armen Hakobyan
Free Motherland - UCA Alliance (16)	Aram Harutyunyan
Free Motherland - UCA Alliance (16)	Lernik Ghalayan
United Motherland (9)	Gagik Baghunts (Vice-President of the National Assembly, head of faction)
United Motherland (9)	Marsel Petrosyan (secretary of faction)
United Motherland (9)	Sevak Aghajanyan
United Motherland (9)	David Baghdasaryan
United Motherland (9)	Arshak Grigoryan
United Motherland (9)	Seyran Hayrapetyan
United Motherland (9)	Nune Melkumyan
United Motherland (9)	Gohar Sargsyan
United Motherland (9)	David Sargsyan
Justice (3)	David Galstyan (head of faction)
Justice (3)	Metakse Hakobyan (secretary of faction)
Justice (3)	Karen Hovhannisyan
ARF (3)	Arthur Mosiyan (head of faction)
ARF (3)	Vahram Balayan (secretary of faction)
ARF (3)	David Ishkhanyan
Democratic Party (2)	David Melkumyan (head of faction)
Democratic Party (2)	Gegham Stepanyan (secretary of faction)
Source: National Assembly of the Republic of Artsakh

== See also ==
- Elections in the Republic of Artsakh
- List of legislatures by country
- List of political parties in Artsakh
- National Assembly (Armenia)
- Politics of Artsakh
- President of the National Assembly of Artsakh
- Sahakyan government
- Second Harutyunyan government
