= Artsakh passport =

Former passport

Artsakhi passport
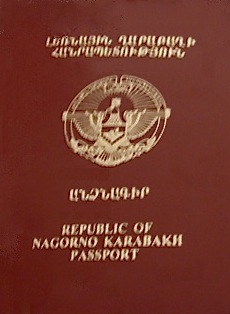
- Type: Passport
- Issued by: Artsakh
- Purpose: Identification
- Eligibility: Artsakhi citizenship

Artsakhi passports (Armenian: Արցախի անձնագիր) were issued to Artsakhi citizens to travel outside the partially recognized Republic of Artsakh. They were also used as proof of identity within the country. Passports of the Republic of Artsakh were issued based on amendments to the Constitution of Artsakh of 2006. Following an Azerbaijani assault on 19 September 2023, Artsakh agreed to dissolve itself by 1 January 2024. In accordance with the agreement, it did so on 1 January 2024, ending its self-proclaimed independence.

== Physical appearance ==
An ordinary Artsakhi passport was dark red, with the Republic of Artsakh's coat of arms emblazoned in gold in the center of the front cover. It was almost identical to the Armenian passport. The words (Armenian: Լեռնային Ղարաբաղի Հանրապետություն) "Republic of Nagorno-Karabakh" and (Armenian: Անձնագիր) "Passport" in the Armenian and English languages also appeared on the front cover. The passport was valid for 10 years from the time of issue, the contents of the passport were in the Armenian and English languages.

== Travel and recognition ==
Due to the status of the state, the passport was not legally recognized by the international community and it was used only within the borders of Artsakh and three other post-Soviet disputed states; Abkhazia, South Ossetia, and Transnistria as all members of the Community for Democracy and Rights of Nations had agreed to abolish visa requirements for their citizens. In addition, citizens of Artsakh could travel visa-free to neighboring Armenia. Most Artsakh citizens also had an Armenian passport for international travel.

Artsakh permitted dual citizenship. A number of Syrian Armenian refugees were granted Artsakh passports when they immigrated in 2012. Since the Second Nagorno-Karabakh War there have been difficulties using the document to establish rights to state assistance in Armenia.

== See also ==
- Armenian passport
- Foreign relations of Artsakh
- Political status of Artsakh
- Republic of Artsakh
- Visa policy of Artsakh
- Visa requirements for Artsakh citizens
