= Armenian nationality law =

Armenian Citizenship Act

Parliament of Armenia
- Long title: An Act relating to Armenian citizenship
- Enacted by: Government of Armenia
- Status: Current legislation

Armenian nationality law is regulated by the Constitution of Armenia, as amended; the Citizenship Law of Armenia and its revisions; and various international agreements to which the country is a signatory. These laws determine who is, or is eligible to be, an Armenian national. The legal means to acquire nationality, formal legal membership in a nation, differ from the domestic relationship of rights and obligations between a national and the nation, known as citizenship. Nationality describes the relationship of an individual to the state under international law, whereas citizenship is the domestic relationship of an individual within the nation. Some countries use the terms nationality and citizenship as synonyms, despite their legal distinction and the fact that they are regulated by different governmental administrative bodies. In Armenia, colloquially the term for citizenship, "քաղաքացիություն", refers to both belonging and rights within the nation and the term for nationality, "ազգություն", refers to ethnic identity. Armenian nationality is typically obtained under the principal of jus sanguinis, i.e. by birth to parents with Armenian nationality. It can be granted to persons with an affiliation to the country, or to a permanent resident who has lived in the country for a given period of time through naturalization.

== Acquiring Armenian nationality ==
Nationality in Armenia is typically acquired by birth to an Armenian or later in life through naturalization.

=== By birth ===
Those who can acquire nationality by birth include:

- Children born anywhere when both parents are Armenian nationals;
- Children born to one parent who is Armenian, if the other parent is stateless or unknown;
- Children born to one parent who is Armenian, but whose other parent has a different nationality, by mutual written agreement of the parents;
- Children born in the territory of Armenia who would otherwise be stateless; or
- Foundlings or orphans discovered in Armenia whose parents are unknown.

=== By naturalization ===
Naturalization in Armenia may be granted to persons who are of the age of majority (18) and have legal capacity. Persons who have established a permanent residency for at least three years, not requiring a permanent residence permit. A test regarding the political system of Armenia, given in the Armenian language is required to confirm an understanding of the constitution and communication skill. To pass the examination half of the answers must be correct. Persons who are of Armenian origin or the spouses, children, or parents of Armenian nationals are not required to take the language test or meet residency requirements. Besides foreigners meeting the criteria, those who can naturalize include:

- Minor children upon request when their parents naturalize;
- Adult children of Armenian nationals;
- Adoptees of Armenian nationals upon completion of a legal adoption;
- The spouse of an Armenian national;
- The parent of an Armenian national;
- Persons who previously renounced Armenian nationality and who request repatriation; or
- Persons who have provided exemplary distinguished service to the nation may naturalize without meeting provisions.

== Loss of nationality ==
Armenian nationals can renounce their nationality as long as the applicant has no active criminal prosecutions pending or legal judgments requiring enforcement, the request would not pose a risk to national security, or there are no outstanding obligations to the nation. Though the Citizenship Act does not require guarantees against statelessness, Decree No. 1552-N of 29 November 2012, required applicants to provide documentation from another nation to the government of Armenia that they have the potential to acquire other nationality. Persons may be denaturalized only in the event that their nationality was acquired fraudulently or under terms specified in international treaties of which Armenia is a signatory.

== Dual nationality ==
Dual nationality has been allowed in Armenia since 2005, as long as the government is notified upon acquisition of additional nationality.

== Residency permits ==
The Law on the Legal Status of Foreign Citizens was passed in 1994 and defined temporary, permanent, and special residency statuses for foreigners residing in Armenia. Its provisions were replaced by the Law on Aliens passed in 2006, which became effective on 16 January 2007. Under its terms foreign persons who have valid travel documents, whether those represent other nationality or indicate that the person is stateless, may apply for Armenian residency. Temporary residency status may be granted for one year, which can be extended annually, to persons who are married to or relatives of Armenians, who are studying, or who are working legally in the country. Permanent residency can be granted to foreign persons who have resided in Armenia for at least three years and who are close relatives of an Armenian and can confirm that they have sufficient means to be self-sufficient and house themselves, or to those are engaged in entrepreneurial pursuits. Permanent residency permits carry a term of five years and may be renewed for additional five-year terms.

Foreigners may also receive a 10-year Special Residency Status, if they are of Armenian ancestry or if they have provided significant services to the Armenian state and/or are engaged in economic and cultural activities in Armenia. Applications must be submitted to the police or the Passport and Visa Department if one is residing in Armenia or to the consular services if one is residing abroad, and must be conferred by the President. The permit may be renewed for additional ten-year terms and allow holders to acquire a Special Armenian Passport. With these passports permit holders are no longer required to obtain entry visas for traveling to Armenia. While in Armenia, they enjoy the full protection of the Armenian law, as well as the rights and obligations of Armenian citizens, except for the right to vote and to run for office, enroll in political organizations. They are exempt from military service in the Armed Forces of Armenia and are not required to obtain work permits to engage in economic activities.

== Visa requirements ==
Visa requirements for Armenian citizens Armenia Visa free Visa issued upon arrival eVisa Visa available both on arrival or online Visa required prior to arrival Admission refused

As of January 2022, Armenian citizens had visa-free or visa on arrival access to 65 countries and territories, ranking the Armenian passport 78th in terms of travel freedom (tied with Beninese, Kyrgyz and Moroccan passports) according to the Henley visa restrictions index.

== History ==
Prior to the rise of the Kingdom of Urartu, tribal people resided in the region known as Nairi, now Armenia. These tribal people had by the eleventh century BC organized governance in the Armenian Highlands in a confederation. By the ninth century BC, became Urartu had emerged as the central authority. With the uniting of the kingdom into a single administrative unit, the kingdom was able to protect the territory from incursion by Assyria and other rivals for two centuries. By the seventh century BC, the kingdom had begun to weaken and invasions by Persian Medes and Scythians allowed Armenian-speaking people to become the dominant group in the region. By 525 BC the highlands had become incorporated into the Achaemenid Empire as the Satrapy of Armenia. In ancient Persia the king had absolute authority as the administrator of his subjects and armies, the giver of law, and the supreme judge of the empire. The centralized government of the empire was divided into satrapies, or provinces, for ease of management and taxation. Local satraps (governors) had no control over the military forces in their region to prevent them diluting the power of the ruler, but they managed the civilian administration over the areas for which they governed. Ethnic groups had legal autonomy to regulate their own internal conflicts. Rulers were responsible for security in the realm and management of the economy. In exchange for protection, Persian subjects paid taxes and owed loyalty to the king and his leadership. Marriage in the period was cum manu meaning the wife was legally incapacitated and under the control of her husband.

The Achaemenid Empire collapsed in around 330 BC, giving rise to the Kingdom of Armenia. The territory it governed stretched from the Black Sea in the west to the Caspian Sea in the east and as far north as Turkey and the Caucasus Mountains to Lebanon in the south. The kingdom was ruled by custom and tradition linked through kinship groups. Allegiance was to the local authority, rather than a centralized administration. This would gradually change and by the first century BC, centralized rule created both efficiency and growth which allowed the kingdom to expand by subduing neighboring states. Their expansion was eventually curtailed by the might of the Roman Empire. Though both the Parthian and Roman Empires occupied the kingdom at various times, none were able to establish a stronghold in the territory until the third century AD. At that time the Kingdom of Armenia became a suzerainty of the Sasanian Empire with its rise to dominance. By 387 AD, Armenia was partitioned into a western area governed by Rome and an eastern area governed by Persia. In 395, the Byzantine Empire emerged as the successor to Rome in the east when the Roman Empire was divided upon the death of Theodosius I. The Kingdom of Armenia survived as a vassal state until 428 AD when the monarchy was abolished. In the absence of the monarchy, the Sasanian and Byzantine Empires, maintained control over Armenia by elevating nakharar, Armenian noble houses, to rule with autonomy in their territory.

From the fifth to the ninth century, Armenia remained under foreign control, with the Arab Rashidun Caliphate gaining superiority from the middle of the seventh century. The Rashidun Caliphate was followed by the Umayyad Caliphate in 661 and its successor, the Abbasid Caliphate in 750 AD. Under Arab rule, Ostikans replaced satraps as regional authorities and were responsible for its defense, economy, and administration. Though Arab direct rule was much more centralized and the nakharar had less autonomy, caliphates maintained the nobles, elevating the Bagratuni dynasty to a level akin to princes of Armenia. In 884, the Bagratid Kingdom was given sovereignty over the northern and eastern portions of the territory and the Arab caliphates relinquished their control. In the tenth century, the Artsruni dynasty, another nakharar established a kingdom in southern Armenia and the two kingdoms competed for supremacy. Though free of Muslim rule, various emirates and Byzantine leaders posed a constant threat to the kingdoms. By the middle of the eleventh Century, Byzantium had reabsorbed most of Armenia. In 1071, the Turko-Persian Seljuk Empire invaded Armenia, defeated the Byzantines and took control of the region. Uninterested in direct rule, the Seljuk Empire left control of the area to its vassals.

Allying themselves with the Kingdom of Georgia, Armeno-Georgian forces were able to restore northern and eastern Armenia to their control. Zakarid Armenia became a vassal state of the Georgian sovereigns, who allowed the Zakarids, also known as Mkhargrdzeli, to rule autonomously. Other Armenians became migrants, fleeing the invaders and moving west. They settled in the Byzantine region of Cilicia near Tarsus, joining prior Armenian migrants who had fled there during previous invasions. Over time, they became governors and eventually established a principality governed by the Rubenid dynasty as a vassal state to the Byzantine Empire. In 1198, having gained the support of Pope Celestine III, the Armenian Kingdom of Cilicia was established and recognized by Byzantium. In around 1220, the Mongol Empire conquered Georgia and brought Armenia under their rule. The Mongols were subsequently attacked by the Egyptian Mamluk Sultanate and the kingdom in Cilicia fell in 1375. Thereafter, Armenians became a diasporic population settling in foreign lands.

=== Ottoman Armenia (1453–1918) ===
In 1453, the Ottoman Empire conquered Constantinople and in 1461 created an Armenian Patriarchate in the city to manage the Armenian population. Within the Ottoman Empire, the government was organized to maintain harmony with disparate groups assigning responsibility to persons in accord with their position within those social categories. For six centuries, there was an internal organization that defined government functions for subjects by balancing religious and communal ties, with aptitudes and occupations without a centralized national ideology. Ottoman subjecthood was strongly tied to religion and non-Muslims, if they were ahl al-Kitāb (People of the Book), meaning Jewish, Christian, or Zoroastrian, could benefit from being subjects by agreeing to pay a tax to the sultan. Under a pact known as zimma, in exchange for paying taxes, the sultan allowed these subjects freedom of religion and guaranteed their lives, property, and rights with an understanding that they were legally entitled to less status than Muslim subjects. The pact was agreed to by the leaders of the confessional community, who managed the adherents and their internal organization under the religious law of their community.

By the fifteenth century a political organization, known as the millet, managed the affairs of their respective religious communities and developed into the protégé system (Turkish: beratlılar, protected persons). Signing treaties with European powers, from the 1673 signing of the Ottoman Capitulation with France, the Ottoman Empire granted France control of certain Ottoman Christians, Austria control of some Ottoman Roman Catholics, most favored nation status to British and Dutch traders, as well as specific rights to the Republic of Venice and Russian Empire. Under the terms of these treaties, foreign powers could recruit Ottoman subjects to serve their needs as commercial agents, consuls, or interpreters, and extend to these protégés diplomatic immunity from prosecution and privileges of trade, including lowered customs tariffs. Over time, abuses of the system led to a virtual monopoly of foreign trade by protégés, clandestine sales of letters patent (Turkish: berats), and demands from foreign powers for protection to extend from individuals to entire communities. The influence on Ottoman subjects by European powers changed the perception of these minority groups in the empire, meaning that they were increasingly seen not as Ottoman subjects, but as resident aliens.

To curb the disruptive effects of Europeans in the empire, from 1806, the Ottoman government began sending communiques to the foreign embassies demanding compliance with the terms of their agreements. Failing to achieve success diplomatically, Mahmud II began a series of reforms to reorganize the government and centralize its authority and administration. An 1822 statute prohibited marriage between Persian and Ottoman subjects. In 1826, Mahmud II abolished the Guild of Janissaries and established a modern army of conscripted subjects with the intent of creating a unified Ottoman identity. Once the army was reorganized, he began to abolish and transform the other guilds aiming to modernize the state. Mahmud II drafted the Edict of Gülhane, incorporating the observations of his foreign minister Mustafa Reşid Pasha. The Edict was designed to end bribery and corruption, and to create fair tax schemes and institutions to protect the basic rights of Ottoman subjects, but Mahmud II died in 1839 before it was promulgated. He was succeeded by his son Abdulmejid I, who continued the reforms of his father. In November, after Mahmud II's death, Reşid declared the Edict, first of the Tanzimat Edicts (Imperial Edicts of Reorganisation) in Istanbul's Gülhane Park to a gathering of ambassadors and dignitaries.

The Ottoman Reform Edict of 1856 (Turkish: Islâhat Fermânı) categorized subjects by whether they were Muslim or non-Muslim, granting different civil statuses to each. In 1863, new regulations upon protégés restricted the privileges they received in the empire and clarifying who were thereafter considered to be Ottoman subjects and who were foreigners. This change led to nationality legislation and the passage of the 1869 Ottoman nationality law (tâbiiyet-i osmaniye kanunnamesi). (Note: Will Hanley, a history professor at Florida State University, notes that the etymology of tâbiiyet includes associations with allegiance, nationality, and subjecthood, or an affiliation to a sovereign, but does not translate as citizenship.) The law specified terms for the acquisition and loss of who was within the sovereignty of the empire, rather than the domestic obligations and rights of citizenship. It described who was a subject, owing allegiance, and made provisions for wives, children, emigrants and immigrants. Under its terms, children derived nationality from their fathers, foreigners born in the territory could acquire nationality at majority, and foreigners born elsewhere could obtain nationality after five years residency within the imperial realm. Specific provisions included that foundlings discovered within the territory; stateless persons living in the empire; Muslim women, who despite the ban on such marriages, had married Persian men and the children of such a union; unregistered persons who had not been counted in the Ottoman census, either because no census was taken or their births were unregistered, were all considered to be Ottoman. Foreign women acquired Ottoman nationality through marriage, but could return to their original nationality upon the death of their spouse. Nationality could also be granted based on special contribution or service to the nation. Dual nationality was permitted, but was discouraged, as the government could choose not to recognize naturalization of an Ottoman subject by another state.

In 1873, a property law was passed forbidding foreign husbands and children from inheriting from a Muslim woman. In 1874, a statute was passed which provided that Ottoman women who married Persian men, as well as their children, retained their status as Ottomans. Subsequently, a law passed in 1883 to prohibit Ottoman subjects from inheritance if they had taken other nationality. These changes were made to curtail the types of extraterritorial abuses which had occurred under the protégé system. Amendments made to the Nationality Law in 1909 included conveyance of nationality to adoptees and to children born on ships in Ottoman waters. It also introduced in Article 6 that foreign wives who acquired nationality by marriage could repatriate to their original nationality upon termination of the marriage; in Article 7 that foreign wives could only naturalize with their foreign husbands; and in Article 19 that women derived the nationality of their husband upon marriage. (Note: Hanley notes that these amendments were influenced by and were very similar to provisions in the 1894 Persian nationality law.) From 1909, Ottoman subjects were allowed to denaturalize with permission of the authorities, but doing so would result in banishment from the empire. During the first year of World War I, Russia armed some of the Armenian population, who hoped to achieve an independent state at the conclusion of the conflict. Fearing widespread revolt, the Ottoman government issued orders in 1915 to disarm Armenian soldiers in the Ottoman army, to deport Armenians to Iraq and Syria, and to expropriate assets belonging to Armenian deportees. Within a year their policies turned from deporting selected individuals to removing all Armenians from Ottoman territory, culminating in the Armenian genocide.

=== Persian and Russian Armenia (1501–1917) ===
In 1494, the Safavid Empire was founded and began expanding from Persia on a quest to conquer and convert territories to Shia Islam. In 1501, Azerbaijan and Armenia came under Safavid control. In 1514, battles began again between the Ottoman Empire and Safavid Persia for control of the South Caucasus. Lasting peace was not established until 1639, when the Treaty of Zuhab partitioned the territory, dividing Armenia by the course of the Arpachai River into Ottoman Armenia in the west and Persian Armenia in the east. In Persia, the word "tabeiat" (Persian: تابعیت), meaning allegiance, described legal belonging to the state, whereas, "meliat" (Persian: ملیت), described ethnic identity and one's sociological context. (Note: Historian and professor H. Lyman Stebbins notes that it is likely that the words were borrowed from the Ottoman nationality law.) Prior to drafting nationality laws, Persian nationality regulations were specified in treaties which defined the extraterritorial jurisdiction that other nations could exercise over their nationals within Persian territory. As early as 1600, capitulations, also known as ahidnâmes, were granted by Persia to Britain, France, and the Netherlands, which gave those nations not only trade monopolies and privileges, but rights for protecting their nationals. Similar to the Ottoman arrangements, for example, France was given the exclusive right over Catholic inhabitants in Persia. Until 1764, persons belonging to the Persian state were referred to as subjects. That year, a treaty was signed with the Ottoman Empire which restricted Persian or Ottoman nationals from fleeing to each other's territory to change their allegiance.

From 1722, when the Safavid Empire fell, Russian expansionist policies focused on the Caucasus. Between 1768 and 1774, conflict between Russia and the Ottoman Empire, caused the resettlement of Armenians to Rostov-on-Don, which was endorsed by the Tsarist government. Hoping to establish an autonomous state, Armenians began negotiations with Russia to extend a protectorate over the population settled in Russian territory. Though the Persian and Russian states adopted policies to expand their trade relationships in this period, in 1794, Persia launched a campaign to regain control over Eastern Armenia, which succeeded in 1796. Competition between the Ottoman, Persian, and Russian states over the Caucasus continued into the nineteenth century. In 1826, the Russo-Persian War began, and over the course of the following two years, Russia gained control of Erevan, Nakhichevan, Sardarabad, and Tabriz. At the conclusion of the war in 1828, by the terms of the Treaty of Turkmenchai, Russia was awarded control of Eastern Armenia and established Russian khanates in Erevan and Nakhichevan.

In Russia, persons residing in the territory of the empire were known as "poddanstvo" (subjects) and were under obligation of absolute subjection to the Tsar until 1917. Subjects were neither allowed to emigrate nor naturalize in a foreign state. The policy emphasized the collective nature of the community, which was jointly responsible to pay tax, provide labor, and share in the harvest to the landlord and state. Foreigners could not enter the country without the approval of the Tsar and were restricted to reside in specific areas and wear identifying clothing. Groups which were prohibited from becoming Russian subjects included Dervishes, Jesuits, Jews, and married women, unless their spouse was Russian. Treaties and trade agreements defined the extraterritorial jurisdiction of foreigners residing in the nation and gave foreigners special privileges, like exemptions from paying taxes, the right to practice their religion, and freedom of movement. From 1721, the only requirement for naturalization of foreigners in the Russian Empire changed from conversion to Russian Orthodoxy to swearing an oath of allegiance to the Tsar. The following year a decree was issued which confirmed that sons born in Russia to foreigners in service to the Tsar were automatically subjects of Russia. Russian policy on territorial annexation up to 1860 was that all persons living in such a territory automatically were conferred Russian nationality, but the rights of citizenship of these groups varied based upon ethnicity, religion, and social status. Throughout the eighteenth century, Armenians were allowed to naturalize and simultaneously allowed to retain their privileges as foreigners.

From 1864, naturalization required a five-year residency. Persons who were in service of the nation, who invested funds that benefited Russia, or who had unique ability or scientific knowledge could acquire nationality with a reduced residency period. Children born to foreigners in Russian territory could choose to acquire Russian nationality within one year of reaching majority, if they had been educated and grew up in Russia. Russian women who married foreigners were no longer Russian subjects and foreign women who married Russians automatically became Russian upon solemnization of a religious marriage. In 1879, Article 7 of the Treaty of Constantinople which was signed at the end of the Russo-Turkish War, set a precedent for annexation thereafter, establishing that residents could choose which nationality they wished to have after annexation terms were agreed upon. (Note: Eric Lohr, chair of the History Department at American University and a specialist on Russian history gives the term of six months for the Treaty of Constantinople. The treaty states, "Les habitants des localités cédées à la Russie qui voudraient fixer leur résidence hors de ces territoires seront libres de se retirer, en vendant leurs propriétés immobilières. Un délai de trois ans leur sera accordé à cet effet à partir de la ratification du présent acte. Passé ce délai, les habitants qui n'auraient pas quitté le pays et vendu leurs immeubles resteront sujets Russes". ["The inhabitants of the localities ceded to Russia who would like to establish their residence outside these territories will be free to withdraw, by selling their immovable properties. A period of three years will be granted to them for this purpose from the ratification of this act. After this period, the inhabitants who have not left the country and sold their buildings will remain Russian subjects".]) Persons who failed to express a desire within the allotted time frame to retain their existing nationality would automatically become Russian. An update to the nationality statutes in 1899 provided that children born anywhere to Russian parents automatically became Russian.

=== War and independence (1914–1920) ===
In 1914, the Ottoman Empire declared war upon Russia, briefly occupied Russian territory, and were defeated in early 1915. In March 1915, negotiations among the Allied Powers focused on the issue of how Ottoman territory would be dealt with at the conclusion of World War I. By the spring of 1916, Russian troops were occupying Western Armenia and secret agreements began being made for Russia to acquire the four Armenian provinces of Bitlis, Erzerum, Trebizond, and Van. In exchange for recognition of other spheres of influence, Britain, France, Italy, and Japan carved out territories they wished to acquire, but prior to gaining Russia's acquiescence, the government was toppled by the Russian Revolution. Under the terms of Article 10 of the Supplement to the Treaty of Brest-Litovsk of 1918, former Russian nationals were to be allowed to choose their nationality in the territories ceded by Russia to the Central Powers. A decree was issued by the Russian Soviet Federative Socialist Republic that such persons had until August 1918 to request denaturalization and leave Russian territory. That year, President of the United States Woodrow Wilson's Fourteen Points proposed that all provinces in the former Ottoman Empire which were not ethnically Turkish should be allowed to become autonomous under international supervision. At the Paris Peace Conference the system of League of Nations mandates was established, wherein once constituted, the League of Nations would oversee in a trustee relationship those territories not yet fully able to self-govern.

In the wake of the Russian Revolution, Armenia, Azerbaijan, and Georgia, joined briefly to form the Transcaucasian Democratic Federative Republic between April and May 1918. The federation refused to accept the territorial cessions of the Brest-Litovsk Treaty leading the Ottomans to launch an offensive against the states and capturing Batumi and Erzurum. The lack of cohesion between the federation states and the Ottoman attack, led to the disintegration of the federation within a month of its founding. Two days after the federation collapsed, the Republic of Armenia declared independence as the governing authority for the Russian Armenian provinces on 28 May 1918. Within days, on 4 June, Ottoman authorities executed the Treaties of Batum, three agreements with each of the now independent states. Under the terms of the Armenian agreement, officially the Treaty of Peace and Friendship between the Imperial Ottoman Government and the Republic of Armenia, significant Armenian territory was ceded to the Ottomans, as per the Brest-Litovsk Treaty, and the terms essentially would have made Armenia a vassal state of the Ottoman Empire.

The treaty was to be ratified within a month in Constantinople, but the Armenians refused to agree to the terms. While signing the treaty was recognition of Armenia as a state by Turkey, it was unrecognized as such by other international countries because its territory was not clarified nor was its administration clearly defined. In 1920, the signing of the Treaty of Sèvres established that Armenia was to be created as an independent state by the international community. However, despite the terms of the treaty, Turkey, the successor state to the Ottoman Empire, refused to vacate the territory. That same year, the Communist Party of Armenia notified the Federative Soviet Republic that Armenia wanted to join the communist federation. Though not representative of the majority of Armenians, the notification justified the entry of the Red Army into the territory and its official incorporation in 1921.

=== Soviet Armenia (1922–1991) ===
In 1922, the Armenian Soviet Socialist Republic was created and joined with the Azerbaijan Soviet Socialist Republic and Georgian Soviet Socialist Republic to form the Transcaucasian Socialist Federative Soviet Republic, which lasted until 1936 and was then separated into its constituent states. Conflict during the Turkish War of Independence did not end until 1923. Under the terms of the 1923 Treaty of Lausanne nationality issues for persons in the successor states to the Ottoman Empire were finally resolved, and persons who resided in territories detached from Turkey ceased to be Turkish and became nationals of their new states effectively on 6 August 1924, unless within two years of that date they requested to retain Turkish nationality. The option did not apply to Armenians because the protracted War of Independence had thwarted provisions in the Treaty of Sèvres to establish an independent state from the Armeno-Ottoman provinces, meaning that Armenians thereafter became members of the successor state in which they were residing.

In 1924, the Soviet Union created a unitary nationality for all inhabitants of the various socialist republics. It presumed that anyone residing within the territory prior to enactment of the statute was automatically a Soviet national, unless they were able to prove otherwise. Under its terms, a child born to at least one parent who was a national of one of the Soviet republics was automatically a national of that republic, as well as the federation. If the parents were residing abroad at the birth of the child, the parents could choose to have Soviet nationality or other nationality. Neither marriage nor naturalization of one party automatically impacted a spouse or children; however, if both parents changed their nationality or renounced Soviet nationality children under the age of fourteen followed the parental nationality. Each Soviet republic was allowed to determine who was eligible for naturalization in their territory. Naturalization gave them Soviet nationality, but did not automatically grant the rights of citizenship other republics. Renunciation of nationality was allowed upon obtaining permission from the Central Executive Committee of the Soviet Union. Nationals could be denaturalized for obtaining dual nationality, leaving federation territory without permission, or by a court order as a punishment for crime. An amendment (Law 581) in 1925 provided that persons who had been granted amnesty for service in the White Army and prisoners of war who had served in the Tsarist or Red Army who were abroad and failed to register with the Soviet Federation were deprived of their nationality, but could apply to be reinstated through naturalization. The mass denaturalizations of Russian people living abroad resulted in approximately 1.5 million stateless persons who were unable to acquire nationality in their places of residence under restrictive policies implemented globally in the interwar years.

In 1930, a resolution was passed specifying that all people within Soviet territory who did not prove that they were nationals of a foreign state were to be recognized as Soviet. In 1938 a new Soviet Nationality Law was passed to conform with the provisions of the 1936 Constitution of the Soviet Union. Under its terms, the soviet republics no longer defined nationality within their borders. Instead, nationality was acquired under the specifications of the Soviet law. The 1938 nationality law did not specify that nationality was acquired at birth through a Soviet parent and made no provisions for foundlings, leaving the possibility open that a child could be born stateless. (Note: George Ginsburgs, a professor of comparative and foreign law at Rutgers University, noted that despite the presumption of jus sanguinis, failure to specify that the principal applied made the nationality law subject to interpretation and in conflict with other legislation, such as the Family Code.) It affirmed that those who had previously acquired Soviet nationality by being subjects of the Russian Empire and those who acquired it under prior laws remained nationals unless they had previously been denaturalized. It specified that persons who were permanent residents in Soviet territory but were foreigners without proof of other nationality were considered to be stateless, a reversal of the previous policy that they were automatically assumed to be Soviet. As a consequence, their children would also be stateless, unless they were allowed to naturalize upon reaching majority. In 1939, a resolution was passed which confirmed that laws which had previously been enacted but which countered the 1938 provision for statelessness were no longer valid.

A 1944 change to the Family Code repealed the right of a woman to sue for the father's identity and nationality to be bestowed upon a child born out of wedlock. The 1944 decree effected all applicable codes, making acquisition of nationality for an illegitimate child derivative of its mother. The result of the statute was that if the mother was stateless or foreign, the child, even if its father was known was unable to be a Soviet national. A decree in 1945 modified the provision slightly, determining that if the parents married the child could be recognized by its father on an equal footing as children born within the marriage. The age of the child was immaterial and their nationality became automatic, as if from birth. After World War II, Soviet policy encouraged repatriation of the Armenian diaspora by offering them private home ownership of which the government would pay half the cost to build. Those who came to the Armenian SSR under the plan were immediately granted Soviet nationality and were not required to renounce any other nationality.

In 1977, the Soviet Union adopted a new constitution, which contained nationality provisions in Chapter 6, reaffirming that persons of any of the constituent states of the Union were Soviet nationals. A new nationality statute was created in 1978, which incorporated all previous legislation for acquiring nationality. It expressly prohibited both dual nationality and extradition of a Soviet national to a foreign state. On 23 August 1990 Armenia declared its independence from the Soviet Union, granting all persons living within the bounds of its territory Armenian nationality. The declaration also specifically mentioned a joint decision made on 1 December 1989 by the Supreme Soviet of the Armenian Soviet Socialist Republic and the Nagorno-Karabakh Autonomous Oblast's Artsakh National Council calling for the reunification of the Armenian SSR and the Mountainous Region of Karabakh. (Note: Beginning in 1988, Armenia and Azerbaijan were at war over what would become of the Nagorno-Karabakh Autonomous Oblast. Perestroika and glasnost policies of Russian president Mikhail Gorbachev promised restructuring of economic and political systems and ignited concerns over what would befall the territory. The conflict did not end until 1994, when the Bishkek Protocol was signed to bring peace by representatives of Armenia, Azerbaijan, and the Nagorno-Karabakh Republic, an internationally unrecognized state.) A referendum held on 21 September 1991, confirmed the desire a ninety-nine percent Armenian majority in favor of independence. By the end of that year, the Soviet Union collapsed and the international community recognized the fifteen former Soviet republics as independent nations.

=== Post-independence (1991–present) ===
After a lengthy consultation process, a constitution was passed for the Republic of Armenia in 1995. The constitution stated that nationality and citizenship in the Republic would be defined by statute and prohibited dual nationality. Subsequently, a Citizenship Act was passed in 1995. It provided a simplified process for persons of Armenian descent, or who married an Armenian to acquire nationality without meeting a residency requirement. Under its terms, those who were conferred nationality at independence were former nationals of the Soviet Union who had previously been citizens in the Armenian SSR, whether currently residing in the territory or abroad, and who had no other nationality, or stateless persons or those who had been citizens of other republics of the Soviet Union but were living in Armenia for three years prior to enactment of the Armenian Citizenship Law.

Those who did not automatically acquire nationality at independence were granted Armenian status if they were born in the territory to stateless parents; born to Armenian nationals; or if they naturalized after a three-year residency and they spoke Armenian and understood the constitution. The residency requirement could be waived for the parents of an Armenian child or for those who had previously been Armenian and who had established residency in the territory. The nationality of children under the age of fourteen changed if the nationality of their parent changed, but the law omitted mention of minors between the age of fourteen and eighteen years old. Nationality could be lost for acquiring other nationality, or for naturalized persons for establishing permanent residence abroad or failing to register with a consular office for seven years, or for committing fraud in a naturalization petition. Article 10(2) of the nationality law, which automatically granted nationality to former Soviet nationals with no other nationality who had at independence completed a three-year residency was modified seven times between 1997 and 2010. Substantial changes were not made until 2001, when an amendment deprived persons of their Armenian nationality, who had been citizens of the Armenian SSR, but were not of Armenian origin, who lived abroad, and who had no other nationality.

In 2005 the constitution was modified to allow dual nationality which prompted a change in 2007 to the nationality law. Specific changes allowed any Armenian to acquire another nationality as long as they notified the government that they had done so. It also removed the provision for loss of nationality upon gaining other nationality. An amendment in 2011 allowed children between the ages of fourteen and eighteen, who were born to Armenian parents to acquire nationality upon written request. It also removed the requirement for ethnic Armenians and those who married Armenians to meet language and residency requirements. In 2021, an amendment was made to the nationality law allowing persons who were of Armenian origin, spouses of Armenian nationals, parents of Armenian children, or children of Armenians to nationality without passing a language examination or residency. The amendment permitted minor children between the ages of fourteen and eighteen to acquire nationality upon their parent's naturalization and for adult children of Armenians to naturalize.

== See also ==
- Armenian diaspora
- Armenians in Syria
- Armenians in Iraq
- Armenians in Iran
- Armenians in Turkey
- Armenians in the Middle East
