= Visa requirements for Armenian citizens =

Administrative entry restrictions

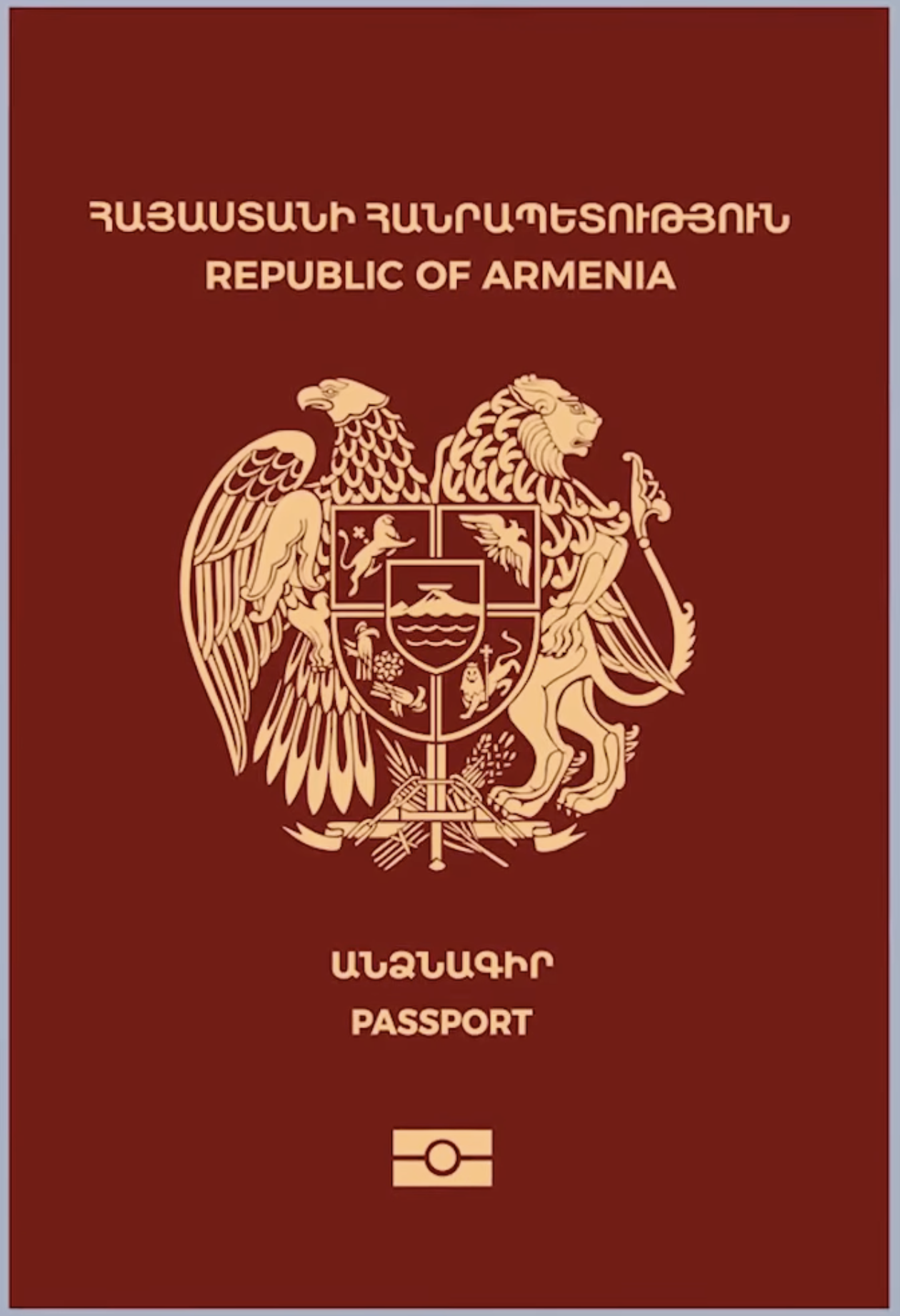
An Armenian passport

Visa requirements for Armenian citizens are administrative entry restrictions by the authorities of other states placed on citizens of Armenia. As of 2026, Armenian citizens had visa-free or visa on arrival access to 64 countries and territories, ranking the Armenian passport 70th in terms of travel freedom according to the Henley Passport Index.

Armenian citizens in other countries also can benefit from the mobility rights arrangements within the Commonwealth of Independent States and the rules of the single market of the Eurasian Economic Union.

On 22 July 2024, the European Commission officially agreed to launch visa liberalization talks with Armenia. Once negotiations conclude, Armenian citizens will be able to travel to the Schengen Area visa-free.

== Visa requirements map ==
Visa requirements for Armenian citizens holding ordinary passports Armenia Visa not required Visa not required (conditional) Visa on arrival eVisa Visa available both on arrival or online Visa required Admission refused

== Visa requirements ==
Country	Visa requirement	Allowed stay	Notes (excluding departure fees)
Afghanistan	eVisa	30 days	Visa is not required in case born in Afghanistan or can proof that one of their parents is a national of Afghanistan or born in Afghanistan.; e-Visa : Visitors must arrive at Kabul International (KBL).
Albania	Visa not required	90 days	90 days within any 180 day period.
Algeria	Visa required		Persons may be denied entry if entering with a passport containing visas or stamps issued by Israel.; Visitors on tours organized to some southern regions by an approved travel agency may obtain a visa on arrival for up to 30 days.
Andorra	Visa required		
Angola	eVisa	30 days	30 days per trip, but no more than 90 days within any 1 calendar year for tourism purposes only.; Visitors must have a return/onward ticket and a hotel reservation confirmation.; An International Certificate of Vaccination is required.
Antigua and Barbuda	Visa not required	1 month	
Argentina	Visa not required	90 days	
Australia	Visa required		May apply online (Online Visitor e600 visa).
Austria	Visa required		
Azerbaijan	Admission refused		
Bahamas	Visa not required	3 months	
Bahrain	eVisa / Visa on arrival	14 days	
Bangladesh	Visa on arrival	30 days	
Barbados	Visa not required	28 days	
Belarus	Visa not required	90 days	90 days. Residence registration is not required for the first 30 days of arrival, after that registration is mandatory. (Registration is the Soviet-type "propiska".)
Belgium	Visa required		
Belize	Visa required		Visa not required, if passengers have with a valid visa issued by a Schengen Member State for a maximum stay of 90 days.
Benin	eVisa	30 days	Must have an international vaccination certificate.; Three types of electronic visa are offered: the e-Visa valid for 30 days for a single entry (50 EUR), the e-Visa valid for 30 days for several (multiple) entries (75 EUR), and the e-Visa valid for 90 days to make several (multiple) entries (100 EUR).
Bhutan	eVisa		The Sustainable Development Fee (SDF) of 200 USD per person, per night for almost all visitors to Bhutan. Additionally, if payment is made in US dollars from September 1, 2023 to August 31, 2027, the SDF is 100 USD.
Bolivia	Online Visa		
Bosnia and Herzegovina	Visa required		Visa not required for a maximum stay of 7 days for valid visa holders or residents of the European Union member states.
Botswana	eVisa	3 months	
Brazil	Visa not required	90 days	
Brunei	Visa required		
Bulgaria	Visa required		
Burkina Faso	eVisa		
Burundi	Online Visa / Visa on arrival	1 month	
Cambodia	eVisa / Visa on arrival	30 days	
Cameroon	eVisa		
Canada	Visa required		
Cape Verde	Visa on arrival		
Central African Republic	Visa required		
Chad	eVisa		
Chile	Visa required		
China	Visa not required	90 days	90 days within any 180 day period.; Visa-free access to Hong Kong for 30 days.; Visa-free access to Macau for 90 days.
Colombia	Online Visa		
Comoros	Visa on arrival	45 days	
Republic of the Congo	Visa required		
Democratic Republic of the Congo	eVisa	7 days	
Costa Rica	Visa required		Visa required, except for Passengers with a multiple-entry business or tourist visa issued by Canada, Iceland, Liechtenstein, Norway, Switzerland or an EU Member State.
Côte d'Ivoire	eVisa	3 months	e-Visa holders must arrive via Port Bouet Airport.
Croatia	Visa required		
Cuba	eVisa	90 days	Can be one time extended with a fee, up to 90 days more.
Cyprus	Visa required		
Czech Republic	Visa required		
Denmark	Visa required		
Djibouti	eVisa	90 days	
Dominica	Visa not required	21 days	
Dominican Republic	Visa required		Visa required, except for passengers with a valid visa issued by Bulgaria, Canada, Croatia, Cyprus, Ireland (Rep.), Romania, United States, United Kingdom or a Schengen Member State.
Ecuador	Visa not required	90 days	
Egypt	eVisa / Visa on arrival	30 days	
El Salvador	Visa required		
Equatorial Guinea	eVisa		
Eritrea	Visa required		
Estonia	Visa required		
Eswatini	Visa required		
Ethiopia	eVisa	90 days	e-Visa holders must arrive via Addis Ababa Bole International Airport.
Fiji	Online Visa		
Finland	Visa required		
France	Visa required		
Gabon	eVisa	90 days	e-Visa holders must arrive via Libreville International Airport.
Gambia	Visa required		
Georgia	Visa not required	1 year	Visitors may enter either with a passport or identification card.
Germany	Visa required		
Ghana	Visa required		
Greece	Visa required		
Grenada	Visa required		
Guatemala	Visa required		
Guinea	eVisa	90 days	
Guinea-Bissau	Visa on arrival	90 days	
Guyana	eVisa		
Haiti	Visa not required	3 months	
Honduras	Visa required		
Hungary	Visa required		
Iceland	Visa required		
India	eVisa	30 days	e-Visa holders must arrive via 32 designated airports (Note: Ahmedabad; Amritsar; Bagdogra; Bengaluru; Bhubaneswar; Chandigarh; Chennai; Coimbatore; Delhi; Gaya; Goa-Dabolim; Goa-Manohar; Guwahati; Hyderabad; Indore; Jaipur; Kannur; Kochi; Kolkata; Kozhikode; Lucknow; Madurai; Mangaluru; Mumbai; Nagpur; Port Blair; Pune; Surat; Thiruvananthapuram; Tiruchirappalli; Varanasi; Visakhapatnam) or 5 designated seaports. (Note: Chennai; Cochin; Mormugao (Goa); Mumbai; Mangalore); An Indian e-Tourist Visa may only be obtained twice within 1 calendar year.; Foreigners of Pakistani origin or who hold a Pakistani Passport are not eligible for an e-Visa. Foreigners who are not Pakistani nationals, but whose parents or grandparents (either paternal or maternal) were born in, or were permanent residents in Pakistan, are also not eligible for an e-Visa.
Indonesia	e-VOA / Visa on arrival	30 days	
Iran	Visa not required	90 days	90 days within any 180 day period.
Iraq	eVisa	30 days	
Ireland	Visa required		
Israel	Visa required		
Italy	Visa required		
Jamaica	Visa on arrival		
Japan	Visa required		
Jordan	eVisa / Visa on arrival	3 months	
Kazakhstan	Visa not required	90 days	90 days within any 180-day period.; Can enter either with a passport or identification card.
Kenya	Electronic Travel Authorisation	90 days	Applications can be submitted up to 90 days prior to travel and must be submitted at least 3 days in advance.; eTA fee is 32.50 USD.; Proof of reservation at the hotel where visitors plan to stay is required (if staying with friends, an invitation letter is also acceptable).; Yellow fever vaccination certificate is required if coming from endemic countries.
Kiribati	Visa required		
North Korea	Visa required		
South Korea	Visa required		Visa-free access to Jeju Island for 30 days.
Kosovo	Visa required		
Kuwait	Visa required		
Kyrgyzstan	Visa not required	90 days	90 days within any 180 day period.
Laos	eVisa / Visa on arrival	30 days	18 (Note: Savannakhet Airport; Lanetoui - Mengkang (China); Meuangmom - Wan Pong (Myanmar); Banvang - Ban Khok Phai (Thailand); Namngeun - Huay Kon (Thailand); Paksan - Bueng Kan (Thailand); Paktaphan - Pak Saeng (Thailand); Pangmon - Ban Huak (Thailand); Phoudou (Thailand); Dak ta ock - Nam Giang (Vietnam); La Lai (Vietnam); Namkan (Vietnam); Namphao - Cau Treo (Vietnam); Namsoy - Na Meo (Vietnam); Naphao - Cha Lo (Vietnam); Pahang - Long Sap (Vietnam); Panghok - Tây Trang (Vietnam); Phoukeua - Bo Y (Vietnam)) of the 33 border crossings are only open to regular visa holders.; e-Visa may be used to enter Laos through the Luang Prabang, Pakse and Vientiane international airports, 3 Thai-Lao Friendship Bridges (Note: Vientiane (Friendship Bridge 1); Savannakhet (Friendship Bridge 2); Bokeo (Friendship Bridge 4)), in Boten (road and railroad), and in Vientiane (at Khamsavath railway station).; Visa on arrival is available at the Luang Prabang, Pakse and Vientiane international airports, 4 Thai-Lao Friendship Bridges (Note: Vientiane (Friendship Bridge 1); Savannakhet (Friendship Bridge 2); Khammouane (Friendship Bridge 3); Bokeo (Friendship Bridge 4)) and 7 border crossings. (Note: Nongnokkheane - Trapeang Kriel (Cambodia); Boten - Bo han (China); Golden Triangle/Samliemkham (Thailand); Khamsavath railway station (Thailand); Namheuang - Ban Na Kraseng (Thailand); Vang tao - Chongmek (Thailand); Dansavan - Lao Bảo (Vietnam))
Latvia	Visa required		
Lebanon	Free visa on arrival	1 month	1 month extendable for 2 additional months.; Granted free of charge at Beirut International Airport or any other port of entry if there is no Israeli visa or seal, holding a telephone number, an address in Lebanon, and a non refundable return or circle trip ticket.
Lesotho	Visa required		
Liberia	e-VOA	3 months	
Libya	eVisa		
Liechtenstein	Visa required		
Lithuania	Visa required		
Luxembourg	Visa required		
Madagascar	eVisa / Visa on arrival	90 days	For stays of 61 to 90 days, the visa fee is 59 USD.
Malawi	eVisa / Visa on arrival	30 days	
Malaysia	Visa not required	30 days	
Maldives	Free visa on arrival	30 days	
Mali	Visa required		
Malta	Visa required		
Marshall Islands	Visa required		
Mauritania	eVisa	30 days	Available at Nouakchott–Oumtounsy International Airport.
Mauritius	Visa on arrival	60 days	
Mexico	Visa required		Visa required, except for passengers with a valid visa issued by Canada, Japan, United States, United Kingdom or a Schengen Member State for a maximum stay of 180 days.
Micronesia	Visa not required	30 days	
Moldova	Visa not required	90 days	90 days within any 180 day period.
Monaco	Visa required		
Mongolia	eVisa	30 days	
Montenegro	Visa required		
Morocco	Visa required		US, UK or Schengen (business or tourist) visa holders are eligible for e-Visa.
Mozambique	eVisa / Visa on arrival	30 days	
Myanmar	Visa required		
Namibia	eVisa / Visa on arrival	90 days / 3 months	Visitors may obtained online or on arrival for a fee of N$1,600 (approximately €82 / US$88).
Nauru	Visa required		
Nepal	eVisa / Visa on arrival	90 days	
Netherlands	Visa required		
New Zealand	Visa required		Diplomatic and service passports with the former USSR symbol issued in Armenia are unacceptable, and visas will not be endorsed in them.; Holders of an Australian Permanent Resident Visa or Resident Return Visa may be granted a New Zealand Resident Visa on arrival permitting indefinite stay (pursuant to the Trans-Tasman Travel Arrangement), subject to meeting character requirements and obtaining an Electronic Travel Authority prior to departure.
Nicaragua	Visa required		
Niger	Visa required		
Nigeria	eVisa	30 days	
North Macedonia	Visa required		
Norway	Visa required		
Oman	Visa not required / eVisa	14 days / 30 days	
Pakistan	Visa required		
Palau	Free visa on arrival	30 days	
Panama	Visa not required	90 days	
Papua New Guinea	eVisa	60 days	Visitors may apply for a visa online under the "Tourist - Own Itinerary" category.
Paraguay	Visa required		
Peru	Visa required		
Philippines	Visa required		Residents of the United Arab Emirates may obtain an eVisa through the official Philippine eVisa website. A valid Emirati residence visa must be shown upon an eVisa application.
Poland	Visa required		
Portugal	Visa required		
Qatar	Visa not required	90 days	90 days within any 180 day period.
Romania	Visa required		
Russia	Visa not required	90 days	90 days within one calendar year period.
Rwanda	Visa not required	30 days	
Saint Kitts and Nevis	eVisa	30 days	
Saint Lucia	Visa required		
Saint Vincent and the Grenadines	Visa not required	3 months	
Samoa	Visa not required	60 days	
San Marino	Visa required		
São Tomé and Príncipe	eVisa		
Saudi Arabia	Visa required		US, UK or Schengen (business or tourist) visa holders are eligible for visa on arrival; the visa must be used at least once and has an entry stamp from the issuing country.
Senegal	Visa on arrival	1 month	
Serbia	Visa not required	90 days	90 days within any 180 day period.; Long stay (up to 180 days) visas are issued free of charge.
Seychelles	Electronic Border System	3 months	Application can be submitted up to 30 days before travel.; Visitors must upload a reservation confirmation(s) for each visitor's location of stay in Seychelles.; Yellow fever vaccination certificate is required if coming from endemic countries.; Payment of the fee (EUR 10) by credit or debit card.; Valid for one journey only and it expires once exit the country.
Sierra Leone	eVisa	3 months	
Singapore	Visa required		May obtain online e-Service through authorized travel agencies or through local sponsors (Singapore citizens or permanent residents).; Visa-free transit for 96 hours.
Slovakia	Visa required		
Slovenia	Visa required		
Solomon Islands	Visa required		
Somalia	eVisa	30 days	
South Africa	Electronic travel authorization		
South Sudan	eVisa		Obtainable online 30 days single entry for 100 USD, 90 days multiple entry for 200 USD and 180 days multiple entry for 350 USD.; Printed visa authorization must be presented at the time of travel.
Spain	Visa required		
Sri Lanka	ETA / Visa on arrival	30 days	
Sudan	Visa required		
Suriname	Visa not required	90 days	An entrance fee of USD 50 or EUR 50 must be paid online prior to arrival.; Multiple entry e-Visa is also available.
Sweden	Visa required		
Switzerland	Visa required		
Syria	eVisa		
Tajikistan	Visa not required	90 days	
Tanzania	eVisa / Visa on arrival	90 days	
Thailand	Visa required		
Timor-Leste	Visa on arrival	30 days	
Togo	eVisa	15 days	
Tonga	Visa required		
Trinidad and Tobago	Visa required		
Tunisia	Visa not required (conditional)		Groups of 10 or more people booking through a travel agency may enter without a visa. They must have a return ticket and a confirmed hotel reservation.
Turkey	eVisa	30 days	
Turkmenistan	Visa required		10-day visa on arrival if holding a letter of invitation provided by a company registered in Turkmenistan with a prior approval from the Foreign Ministry. Visitors can apply to extend their stay for an additional 10 days.; When transiting between two non-bordering countries, visitors can obtain a Turkmenistan transit visa for a five-day stay. This must be applied for in advance at the Turkmenistan Embassy. Visitors must also submit copies of the visas for the country of entry into Turkmenistan and the country of departure from Turkmenistan. Visa fee is 20 USD.
Tuvalu	Visa on arrival	1 month	
Uganda	eVisa	3 months	
Ukraine	Visa not required	90 days	
United Arab Emirates	Visa not required	90 days	90 days within any 180 day period.
United Kingdom	Visa required		
United States	Visa required		
Uruguay	Visa not required	90 days	
Uzbekistan	Visa not required	90 days	90 days within any 180-day period.
Vanuatu	eVisa	120 days	
Vatican City	Visa required		
Venezuela	eVisa		Introduction of Electronic Visa System for Tourist and Business Travelers.
Vietnam	eVisa		e-Visa is valid for 90 days and multiple entry.
Yemen	Visa required		Yemen introduced an e-Visa system for visitors who meet certain eligibility requirements (group travel of 10 or more people, business trips, and transit etc.).
Zambia	eVisa	90 days	
Zimbabwe	eVisa / Visa on arrival	1 month	

== Dependent, disputed, or restricted territories ==
Unrecognized or partially recognized countries

Territory	Conditions of access	Notes
Abkhazia	Visa required	Tourists from all countries (except Georgia) can visit Abkhazia for a period not exceeding 24 hours as part of an organized tourist group.
Kosovo	Visa not required	90 days
Northern Cyprus	Visa not required	90 days
Palestine	Visa not required	
Somaliland	visa required	
South Ossetia	Visa required	To enter South Ossetia, visitors must have a multiple-entry visa for Russia and register their stay with the Migration Service of the Ministry of Internal Affairs within 3 days.
Taiwan	Visa required	May apply for an eVisa if holding a valid visa or resident certificate issued by a Schengen country, or a valid resident certificate or visa valid for more than 180 days issued by the United States.

Dependent and autonomous territories

Territory	Conditions of access	Notes
China
Hong Kong	Visa not required	30 days
Macau	Visa not required	90 days
Ecuador
Galápagos	Pre-registration required	60 days; Visitors must pre-register to receive a 20 USD Transit Control Card (TCT).

== History ==
- On 2 May 2002, Brazil lifted visa requirements for the citizens of Armenia.
- On 28 June 2006, Ecuador lifted visa requirements for the citizens of Armenia.
- On 23 June 2008, Bolivia lifted visa requirements for the citizens of Armenia.
- On 1 August 2009, Belarus lifted visa requirements for the citizens of Armenia.
- On 17 November 2009, Russia lifted visa requirements for the citizens of Armenia.
- On 13 July 2010, Jamaica introduced a visa on arrival for the citizens of Armenia.
- On 16 October 2010, Haiti lifted visa requirements for the citizens of Armenia.
- On 12 December 2010, Dominica lifted visa requirements for the citizens of Armenia
- On 18 February 2011, Singapore introduced E-visa for the citizens of Armenia.
- On 27 February 2011, Micronesia lifted visa requirements for the citizens of Armenia.
- On 5 April 2011, Antigua and Berduda lifted visa requirements for the citizens of Armenia.
- On 10 May 2011, Moldova lifted visa requirements for the citizens of Armenia.
- On 12 July 2011, Ukraine lifted visa requirements for the citizens of Armenia.
- On 15 September 2011, Argentina lifted visa requirements for the citizens of Armenia.
- On 12 November 2012, Lebanon lifted visa requirements for the citizens of Armenia.
- On 3 July 2013, Georgia lifted visa requirements for the citizens of Armenia.
- On 18 September 2013, Namibia lifted visa requirements for the citizens of Armenia.
- On 20 December 2013, Saint Vincent and The Grenadines lifted visa requirements for the citizens of Armenia.
- On 9 July 2014, Uruguay lifted visa requirements for the citizens of Armenia.
- On 14 October 2014, Jordan lifted visa requirements for the citizens of Armenia.
- On 15 August 2015, India introduced e-Visa for the citizens of Armenia.
- On 7 October 2015, Indonesia lifted visa requirements for the citizens of Armenia.
- On 10 November 2015, Malaysia lifted visa requirements for the citizens of Armenia.
- In 2016, Iran lifted visa requirements for the citizens of Armenia.
- On June 12, 2017, Ethiopia introduced e-Visa for the citizens of Armenia.
- On 23 June 2017, Qatar lifted visa requirements for the citizens of Armenia.
- On 14 August 2017, Bahamas lifted visa requirements for the citizens of Armenia.
- On 15 March 2017, the former President of Armenia, Serzh Sargsyan announced that Armenia will launch talks with the European Union over establishing visa-free travel for Armenian citizens into the EU's Schengen Area soon.
- On 23 March 2017 The United Arab Emirates and Armenia agreed on exempting citizens of both countries from visas, as they will be given visas on arrival at the airport.
- On 20 April 2017, Montenegro lifted visa requirements for the citizens of Armenia.
- On 16 March 2018, Albania lifted visa requirements for the citizens of Armenia.
- On 1 May 2018 the newly appointed Prime Minister of Armenia, Nikol Pashinyan announced that Armenian citizens would be able to travel within the EU's Schengen Area visa-free in the nearest future.
- On 24 August 2018 the Chancellor of Germany, Angela Merkel during her meeting with the Prime Minister of Armenia Nikol Pashinyan said "Georgian and Ukrainian citizens don't need visa to enter the European Union, and we will do everything possible to reach visa liberalisation with Armenia as well."
- On 25 April 2019, Tanzania introduced E-visa for the citizens for Armenia.
- On 2 August 2019, Madagascar introduced a visa on arrival for the citizens of Armenia.
- On 1 March 2020, Serbia lifted visa requirements for the citizens of Armenia.
- On 20 July 2020, China lifted visa requirements for the citizens of Armenia.
- On 13 September 2020, South Sudan introduced E-visa for the citizens of Armenia.
- On 20 January 2021, Oman lifted visa requirements for the citizens of Armenia.
- On 21 October 2021, Dominica lifted visa requirements for the citizens of Armenia.
- On 8 September 2023, the United Arab Emirates and Armenia announced their mutual visa regimes had been lifted.
- On 1 March 2025, Nationals of the Republic of Armenia, from 1 March to 1 November 2025, may enter, pass through the territory and stay in Montenegro up to 30 days, with a valid travel document, without a visa.
- On 11 August 2025, Oman granted visa-free entry to citizens of Armenia.
- On 24 August, 2026 Northern Cyprus declared it will start to issue e-Visas for citizens of Armenia in nearest future.

=== Artsakh ===
- Armenian citizens did not require a visa to enter the disputed region of the Republic of Artsakh. The unrecognized republic officially dissolved on 1 January 2024 following an Azerbaijani offensive.

== Non-visa restrictions ==
=== Blank passport pages ===
Many countries require a minimum number of blank pages to be available in the passport being presented, typically one or two pages. Endorsement pages, which often appear after the visa pages, are not counted as being valid or available.

=== Vaccination ===
Cover of the new International Certificate of Vaccination issued by the Bureau of Quarantine in the Philippines since 2021

The African countries of Angola, Benin, Burkina Faso, Burundi, Cameroon, Central African Republic, Democratic Republic of the Congo, Republic of the Congo, Côte d'Ivoire, Gabon, Ghana, Guinea-Bissau, Mali, Niger, Sierra Leone and Togo, South Sudan and Uganda, along with French Guiana in South America, require all incoming passengers older than nine months to one year, to have a current International Certificate of Vaccination or Prophylaxis.

Some other countries require vaccination only if the passenger is coming from an infected area or has visited one recently or has transited for 12 hours in those countries: Algeria, Botswana, Cabo Verde, Chad, Djibouti, Egypt, Eswatini, Ethiopia, Gambia, Ghana, Guinea, Lesotho, Libya, Equatorial Guinea, Eritrea, Madagascar, Malawi, Mauritania, Mauritius, Mozambique, Namibia, Nigeria, Papua New Guinea, Seychelles, Somalia, South Africa, Sudan, Tunisia, Uganda, Tanzania, Zambia and Zimbabwe.

=== Passport validity length ===
Very few countries, such as Paraguay, just require a valid passport on arrival.

However many countries and groupings now require only an identity card – especially from their neighbours. Other countries may have special bilateral arrangements that depart from the generality of their passport validity length policies to shorten the period of passport validity required for each other's citizens or even accept passports that have already expired (but not been cancelled).

Some countries, such as Japan, Ireland and the United Kingdom, require a passport valid throughout the period of the intended stay.

In the absence of specific bilateral agreements, countries requiring passports to be valid for at least 6 more months on arrival include Afghanistan, Algeria, Anguilla, Bahrain, Bhutan, Botswana, British Virgin Islands, Brunei, Cambodia, Cameroon, Cape Verde, Cayman Islands, Central African Republic, Chad, Comoros, Costa Rica, Côte d'Ivoire, Curaçao, Ecuador, Egypt, El Salvador, Equatorial Guinea, Fiji, Gabon, Guinea Bissau, Guyana, Haiti, India, Indonesia, Iran, Iraq, Israel, Jordan, Kenya, Kiribati, Kuwait, Laos, Madagascar, Malaysia, Marshall Islands, Mongolia, Myanmar, Namibia, Nepal, Nicaragua, Nigeria, Oman, Palau, Papua New Guinea, Peru, Philippines, Qatar, Rwanda, Samoa, Saudi Arabia, Singapore, Solomon Islands, Somalia, Sri Lanka, Sudan, Suriname, Tanzania, Thailand, Timor-Leste, Tokelau, Tonga, Turkey, Tuvalu, Uganda, United Arab Emirates, Vanuatu, Venezuela, and Vietnam.

Countries requiring passports valid for at least 4 months on arrival include Micronesia and Zambia.

Countries requiring passports with a validity of at least 3 months beyond the date of intended departure include Azerbaijan, Bosnia and Herzegovina, Honduras, Montenegro, Nauru, Moldova and New Zealand. Similarly, the EEA countries of Iceland, Liechtenstein, Norway, all European Union countries (except Ireland) together with Switzerland also require 3 months validity beyond the date of the bearer's intended departure unless the bearer is an EEA or Swiss national.

Countries requiring passports valid for at least 3 months on arrival include Albania, North Macedonia, Panama, and Senegal.

Bermuda requires passports to be valid for at least 45 days upon entry.

Countries that require a passport validity of at least one month beyond the date of intended departure include Eritrea, Hong Kong, Lebanon, Macau, the Maldives and South Africa.

==== Maximum passport age ====
Countries of the Schengen area require non-EU passports to be less than 10 years old upon entry.

=== Criminal record ===
Some countries, including Australia, Canada, Fiji, New Zealand and the United States, routinely deny entry to non-citizens who have a criminal record, while others impose restrictions depending on the type of conviction and the length of the sentence.

=== Persona non grata ===
The government of a country can declare a diplomat persona non grata, banning them from entering the country or expelling them if they have already entered. In non-diplomatic use, the authorities of a country may also declare a foreigner persona non grata permanently or temporarily, usually because of unlawful activity.

=== Israeli stamps ===
Kuwait, Lebanon, Libya, and Yemen do not allow entry to people with passport stamps from Israel or whose passports have either a used or an unused Israeli visa, or where there is evidence of previous travel to Israel such as entry or exit stamps from neighbouring border posts in transit countries such as Jordan and Egypt.

To circumvent this Arab League boycott of Israel, the Israeli immigration services have now mostly ceased to stamp foreign nationals' passports on either entry to or exit from Israel (unless the entry is for some work-related purposes). Since 15 January 2013, Israel no longer stamps foreign passports at Ben Gurion Airport. Passports are still (as of 22 June 2017) stamped at Erez when passing into and out of Gaza.

Iran refuses admission to holders of passports containing an Israeli visa or stamp that is less than 12 months old.

=== Biometrics ===
Several countries mandate that all travellers, or all foreign travellers, be fingerprinted on arrival and will refuse admission to or even arrest travellers who refuse to comply. In some countries, such as the United States, this may apply even to transit passengers who merely wish to change planes rather than go landside.

Fingerprinting countries/regions include Afghanistan, Argentina, Brunei, Cambodia, China, Ethiopia, Ghana, Guinea, India, Japan, Kenya (both fingerprints and a photo are taken), Malaysia upon entry and departure, Mongolia, Saudi Arabia, the Schengen Area, Singapore, South Korea, Taiwan, Thailand, Uganda, the United Arab Emirates and the United States.

Many countries also require a photo be taken of people entering the country. The United States, which does not fully implement exit control formalities at its land frontiers (although long mandated by its own legislation), intends to implement facial recognition for passengers departing from international airports to identify people who overstay their visa.

Together with fingerprint and face recognition, iris scanning is one of three biometric identification technologies internationally standardised since 2006 by the International Civil Aviation Organization (ICAO) for use in e-passports and the United Arab Emirates conducts iris scanning on visitors who need to apply for a visa. The United States Department of Homeland Security has announced plans to greatly increase the biometric data it collects at US borders. In 2018, Singapore began trials of iris scanning at three land and maritime immigration checkpoints.

== See also ==
- Armenian diaspora
- Armenian passport
- Foreign relations of Armenia
- Largest Armenian diaspora communities
- List of nationalities forbidden at border
- Visa policy of Armenia
- Visa requirements for Artsakh citizens
