= Visa policy of Artsakh =

Defunct policy on permits required to enter Artsakh

Visitors to the former Republic of Artsakh had to obtain a visa, unless they came from one of the visa exempt countries.

== Visa exemption ==
Citizens of the following countries, including those from the Commonwealth of Independent States and all Eurasian Union member states, could visit Artsakh without a visa:

- Armenia
- Belarus
- Kazakhstan
- Kyrgyzstan
- Moldova
- Russia
- Tajikistan
- Turkmenistan
- Ukraine
- Uzbekistan

In addition to the countries above, citizens of three other Post-Soviet disputed states could travel visa free to Artsakh. All members of the Community for Democracy and Rights of Nations have agreed to abolish visa requirements for their citizens:

- Abkhazia
- South Ossetia
- Transnistria

== Visa required in advance ==
Citizens of other countries could obtain a visa in the Permanent Mission of Artsakh to Armenia. In exceptional cases, the entrance visa could be granted at the Ministry of Foreign Affairs of the Republic of Artsakh in Stepanakert. There was a single 21-day tourist visa available, and single and multiple visas valid for up to one, two or three months.

Travelers with Artsakh visa (expired or valid) or evidence of travel to Artsakh (stamps) without Azerbaijani government permission will be permanently refused entry and transit to Azerbaijan, and they will be also listed as persona non grata.

In 2021, a new procedure for entering the republic was put into effect. According to the amendments, all representatives of international media wishing to conduct journalistic activities in Artsakh must be accredited by both the Artsakh and Armenian Foreign Ministries.

== Admission refused ==
Citizens of the following four countries and one partially recognized country were prohibited from entering the territory of the Republic of Artsakh:

- Afghanistan
- Azerbaijan
- Northern Cyprus
- Pakistan
- Turkey

== See also ==
- Foreign relations of Artsakh
- Visa requirements for Artsakh citizens
- Foreign relations of Armenia
- Visa policy of Armenia
- Visa policy of Transnistria
- Visa policy of Abkhazia
- Visa policy of South Ossetia
