= Visa policy of Armenia =

Policy on permits required to enter Armenia

Visitors to Armenia must obtain a visa from one of the Armenian diplomatic missions unless they are citizens of one of the visa-exempt countries, or citizens who may obtain a visa on arrival, or citizens eligible for an e-Visa.

Armenia's visa and other migration policies are also implemented in accordance with the mobility rights arrangements within the Commonwealth of Independent States and the rules of the single market of the Eurasian Economic Union.

== Visa policy map ==
Visa policy of Armenia Armenia Visa not required - may enter with an internal passport or ID card (180 days) Visa not required (180 days) Visa not required (90 days) Visa on arrival / eVisa (120 days) Visa on arrival (conditional) / eVisa Visa required Special entry permit required

== Visa exemption ==
=== Ordinary passports ===
Citizens of the following countries and territories may enter Armenia without a visa for the following period:

180 days in a year

- All European Union member states
- All European Free Trade Association member states

- Albania
- Andorra
- Argentina
- Australia
- Bahrain
- Belarus
- Brazil
- Ecuador
- Georgia^{ID}
- Hong Kong^{A}
- Japan
- Kazakhstan
- Kuwait
- Kyrgyzstan
- Macau^{A} ^{B}
- Moldova
- Monaco
- Montenegro
- New Zealand
- Oman
- Panama
- Qatar
- Russia^{IP}
- San Marino
- Saudi Arabia
- Serbia
- Singapore
- South Korea
- Tajikistan
- Ukraine
- United Arab Emirates
- United Kingdom
- United States
- Uruguay
- Uzbekistan
- Vatican City

90 days within any 180 days

- China^{A}
- Iran

_{ID - May enter with an ID card in lieu of a passport if arriving directly from Georgia.}
_{IP - May enter with an internal passport in lieu of a passport if arriving by air.}
_{A - For Chinese citizens with People's Republic of China passports, Hong Kong Special Administrative Region passports or Macao Special Administrative Region passports.}
_{B - For holders of Macao Special Administrative Region Travel Permis regardless of their nationality.}

=== Non-ordinary passports ===
In addition to countries whose citizens are visa-exempt, holders of diplomatic, official or service passports may enter Armenia without a visa for the following period:

180 days in a year

- Lebanon

90 days

- Chile
- Egypt^{D}
- India^{D}
- Iran
- Israel^{D}
- Mexico
- Philippines
- Syria
- Tunisia^{D}
- Vietnam

90 days within any 180 days

- Kuwait
- Jordan^{D}

90 days in a year

- Bosnia and Herzegovina^{D}

30 days

- Indonesia
- Malaysia
- Mongolia
- Turkmenistan

_{D - Diplomatic passports only.}

=== Future changes ===
Armenia has signed visa exemption agreements with the following countries, but they have not yet been ratified:

Country	Passports	Agreement signed on
Angola	Diplomatic, service	25 September 2026
Rwanda	Diplomatic, service, special	25 September 2026
Benin	Diplomatic, service	24 September 2026

== Visa on arrival ==
Visitors traveling as tourists from the following countries may obtain a visa on arrival for a maximum stay of 120 days at a cost of 15,000 AMD. They may also obtain an e-Visa in advance.

- Antigua and Barbuda
- Bahamas
- Barbados
- Bosnia and Herzegovina
- Canada
- Chile
- Dominica
- Dominican Republic
- Indonesia
- Israel
- Jordan
- North Korea
- Lebanon
- Mexico
- North Macedonia
- Peru
- Saint Vincent and the Grenadines
- South Africa
- Thailand
- Turkey

=== Conditional visa on arrival ===
Citizens of these countries and territories may apply for a visa on arrival only if they hold a valid visa issued by any Schengen Area member state, Australia, Canada, Cyprus, Ireland, Japan, New Zealand, South Korea, the United Kingdom or the United States, or a residence permit issued by any GCC member state, any Schengen Area member state, Cyprus, Ireland or the United States. If eligible, they may also apply for an e-Visa in advance.

- ASEAN member states (except Singapore, Indonesia and Thailand)

- Algeria
- Belize
- Bhutan
- Bolivia
- Colombia
- Costa Rica
- Cuba
- Egypt
- El Salvador
- Fiji
- Grenada
- Guatemala
- Guyana
- Haiti
- Honduras
- India
- Iraq
- Jamaica
- Kiribati
- Maldives
- Marshall Islands
- Micronesia
- Mongolia
- Morocco
- Nauru
- Nicaragua
- Palau
- Papua New Guinea
- Paraguay
- Saint Kitts and Nevis
- Saint Lucia
- Samoa
- Solomon Islands
- Suriname
- Timor-Leste
- Tonga
- Trinidad and Tobago
- Tunisia
- Turkmenistan
- Tuvalu
- Vanuatu
- Venezuela

== Electronic visa (e-Visa) ==
All foreign citizens (except those who require a regular visa) are also eligible to obtain an e-Visa. If approved, the e-Visa allows applicants to stay in the country for up to 120 days or 141 days with a fee of 34€ (120 days validity) or 7€ (21 days validity). The application must be submitted at least 3 business days before the trip.

== Visa required in advance ==
Citizens of the following countries and territories must apply for a physical visa at an Armenian embassy or consulate, and only with an invitation:

- African Union member states (except Algeria, Egypt, Morocco, South Africa and Tunisia)

- Afghanistan
- Azerbaijan^{A}
- Bangladesh
- Nepal
- Pakistan
- Palestine
- Sri Lanka
- Syria
- Yemen

_{A - Citizens of Azerbaijan must have a special entry permit.}

== Admission restrictions ==
Armenia does not recognize the passports of Abkhazia, Northern Cyprus, the Sahrawi Republic, Somaliland, South Ossetia and Transnistria.

== Visitor statistics ==
Country	2021	2020	2019
Russia	▲381,569	169,871	855,612
Iran	127,146	No data	160,881
Georgia	87,630	No data	344,507
United States	31,662		
Ukraine	22,267		
India	17,980		
China	13,451	No data	15,550
France	14,310		
Germany	11,936		
Canada	9,378		
Netherlands	7,573		
Belarus	7,244		
Belgium	5,744		
Kazakhstan	5,451	No data	39,882
Japan	5,290		
Philippines	4,461		
Argentina	4,278		
Uzbekistan	4,206	No data	9,630
Poland	4,176		
Vietnam	4,051		
Iraq	4,004		
South Korea	3,870		
United Kingdom	3,756		
Turkey	3,729		
Lebanon	3,373		
Sweden	2,532		
Spain	2,301		
Indonesia	2,246		
Italy	2,231		
Egypt	2,171		
Bulgaria	2,169		
Saudi Arabia	2,160		
Austria	2,143		
Kyrgyzstan	2,141		
Romania	2,129		
Syria	2,122		
Brazil	2,121		
Switzerland	2,116		
Israel	2,106		
UAE	2,091	No data	11,028
Malaysia	2,087		
Greece	2,080		
Moldova	2,041		
Tajikistan	2,029		
Jordan	2,006		
(United Nations) Other countries	38,881	190,467	2,882,528
Total	▲870,308	▼360,338	4,319,618

== See also ==
- Armenian passport
- Foreign relations of Armenia
- Visa policy of Artsakh
- Visa requirements for Armenian citizens
