= Foreign relations of Artsakh =

The Republic of Artsakh was a republic with limited recognition in the South Caucasus region. The Republic of Artsakh controlled most of the territory of the former Nagorno-Karabakh Autonomous Oblast (before the Second Nagorno-Karabakh War, it also controlled some of the surrounding area). It was recognized only by three other non-UN member states, Abkhazia, South Ossetia and Transnistria. The rest of the international community recognized Artsakh as part of Azerbaijan. In November 2012, a member of Uruguay's foreign relations committee stated that his country could recognize Nagorno-Karabakh's independence. In 2012, Armenia and Tuvalu established diplomatic relations, which led to speculation of possible recognition of Artsakh by Tuvalu. In October 2012, the Australian state of New South Wales recognized Nagorno-Karabakh. In September 2014, the Basque Parliament in Spain adopted a motion supporting Artsakh's right to self-determination and in November 2014, the Parliament of Navarre, also in Spain, issued a statement supporting Artsakh's inclusion in taking part in settlement negotiations.

No diplomatic missions of other countries ever existed in Artsakh, due to its lack of international recognition. On the other hand, the republic built a small network of representative offices around the world, with representative offices in seven countries.

Following an Azerbaijani assault on 19 September 2023, Artsakh agreed to dissolve itself by 1 January 2024. In accordance with the agreement, it did so on 1 January 2024, ending its self-proclaimed independence. Following 2023 Azerbaijani offensive in Artsakh, the Artsakh government announced its decision to operate in exile from Yerevan, Armenia.

== Ministry of Foreign Affairs ==
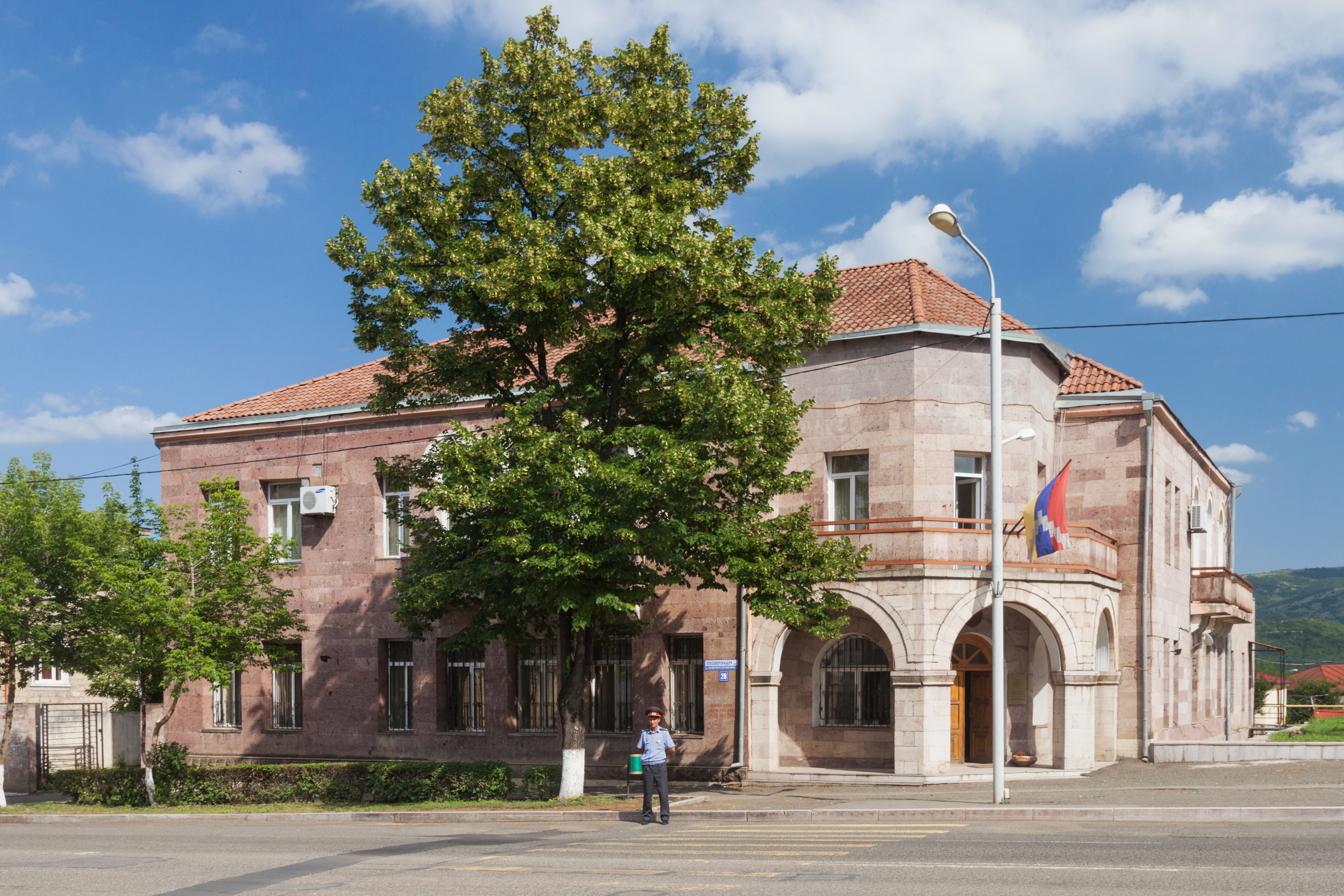
The Artsakh Ministry of Foreign Affairs in Stepanakert

Foreign policy of the state was governed by the Ministry of Foreign Affairs of Republic of Artsakh. The Ministry was based in the capital city of Stepanakert.

Below is a list of the foreign ministers that represented the Republic of Artsakh:

- 1993–1997: Arkadi Ghukasyan
- 1997–2002: Naira Melkumian
- 2002–2004: Ashot Gulyan
- 2004–2005: Arman Melikyan
- 2005–2011: Georgy Petrosyan
- 2011–2012: Vasily Atajanyan (acting)
- 2012–2017: Karen Mirzoyan
- 2017–2021: Masis Mayilyan
- 2021–2023: David Babayan
- 2023–2024: Sergey Ghazaryan

== Bilateral relations ==
=== Abkhazia ===
The Republic of Artsakh and the partially recognized Republic of Abkhazia recognized each other. Both states abolished visa requirements for their citizens and participated in the Community for Democracy and Rights of Nations.

=== Australia ===
In 2012, the Parliament of New South Wales called upon the Australian government to recognize Artsakh. Artsakh maintained a Representative Office in Sydney, Australia.

=== Armenia ===
While Armenia never recognized Artsakh, they had very close relations. It functioned as a de facto part of Armenia. A representative office of Nagorno-Karabakh was established in Yerevan.

=== Europe ===
The Republic of Artsakh maintained three representative offices in Europe, including Berlin, Paris, and Moscow.

Artsakh gave a positive response to the Russian recognition of Donetsk and Luhansk, however this did not extend to their own issuance of recognition.

=== Lebanon ===
The Republic of Artsakh maintained a Representative office in Lebanon's capital, Beirut. In March 2018, Artsakh president Bako Sahakyan visited Lebanon and met with Catholicos Aram I, the head of the Catholicosate of the Great House of Cilicia of the Armenian Apostolic Church. In May 2018, representatives of the Artsakh city of Martakert and the Lebanese town of Bourj Hammoud signed a Memorandum of Cooperation in the latter town.

=== South Ossetia ===
The Republic of Artsakh and partially recognized Republic of South Ossetia recognized each other. Both states abolished visa requirements for their citizens and participated in the Community for Democracy and Rights of Nations.

=== Transnistria ===
The Republic of Artsakh and Transnistria recognized each other and abolished visa requirements for their citizens. There were many joint activities between the two countries. In 2001, both countries in Stepanakert signed the Protocol on Cooperation and Consultations between the Ministry of Foreign Affairs of Transnistria and the Ministry of Foreign Affairs of Artsakh. Transnistria also participates in the Community for Democracy and Rights of Nations.

=== Ukraine ===
Ukraine did not recognize Artsakh, and supplied Azerbaijan with weapons during the First Nagorno-Karabakh War.

During the Russian invasion of Ukraine, Artsakh sent 14 tones of humanitarian aid to Ukraine, namely into the Kyiv and Zaporizhzhia Oblasts. However, this aid was sent "through the Russian peacekeeping troops in Artsakh".

=== United States ===
The United States never established diplomatic relations with the Republic of Artsakh and recognized it as part of Azerbaijan. Support for Artsakh in the United States manifested above all at the state legislature level. Several of them adopted Artsakh support resolutions. In May 2012, the Rhode Island House of Representatives in the United States passed a resolution calling on President Barack Obama and the U.S. Congress to recognize the Republic of Artsakh. In August 2012, the Massachusetts House of Representatives passed a similar resolution. In April 2013, the Maine House of Representatives and Senate passed a resolution accepting Artsakh's independence and urging President Barack Obama to also accept Artsakh's independence. In May 2013, the Louisiana State Senate passed a resolution accepting Artsakh's independence and expressed support for the Republic of Artsakh's efforts to develop as a free and independent nation. In May 2014, the California State Assembly passed a measure recognizing Artsakh's independence with a 70–1 vote. The measure also called for President Barack Obama and the U.S. Congress to recognize the Republic of Artsakh. The US state of Hawaii unanimously voted to approve and recognize the Republic of Artsakh on March 30, 2016. The Republic of Artsakh also established a representative office in Washington, D.C.

In addition, Artsakh government officials regularly maintained contact with members of the United States Congress. In October 2019, the Foreign Minister of Artsakh noted that the authorities of the Republic attach great importance to the relations between Artsakh and the United States at various levels. The Minister also stated his appreciation of the United States for financial aid and support for the peaceful resolution of the conflict, and hoped for further developing cooperation during a meeting with US Congress members.

== Independence recognition efforts ==
=== Non-UN member states ===
Entity	Date of recognition	Notes
Abkhazia	November 17, 2006	Mutual recognition
South Ossetia	November 17, 2006	Mutual recognition
Transnistria	July 4, 2001 or before	Mutual recognition

=== U.S. states ===
U.S. states' recognition of Artsakh

Passed a bill recognizing Artsakh	Rejected a bill recognizing Azerbaijani territorial integrity	Rejected a bill recognizing Artsakh	Passed a bill recognizing Azerbaijani territorial integrity
California (May 2014); Georgia (March 2016); Hawaii (March 2016); New Jersey (June 2021); Louisiana (May 2013); Maine (April 2013); Massachusetts (August 2012); Michigan (September 2017); Rhode Island (May 2012); Colorado (April 2019); Minnesota (May 2020); Idaho (April 2021)	Kentucky (March 2016); Mississippi (April 2014); South Dakota (February 2014); Tennessee (March 2014); Wyoming (February 2014)	Vermont (April 2014)	Arizona (January 2014); New Mexico (February 2014)

=== Other ===
In October 2012, the Australian state of New South Wales recognized Nagorno-Karabakh however it was reaffirmed by the Australian Foreign Minister in November 2015 that the federal government of the Commonwealth of Australia does not, and supports Azerbaijan's claim to the state. In 2017, The Australian Greens Party announced that it recognizes the Republic of Artsakh (Nagorno-Karabakh). In October 2020, the New South Wales Legislative Assembly recognized the independence of the Republic of Artsakh, 61 for and 2 against. The motion also condemned the attacks by Azerbaijan and Turkey against the indigenous Armenians of Artsakh during the Second Nagorno-Karabakh War.

In September 2014, the Basque parliament adopted a motion supporting Nagorno-Karabakh's right to self-determination. In the Philippines, various politicians are in favor of Artsakh (Nagorno-Karabakh) recognition and have suggested for the cooperation of ASEAN (which includes ten Southeast Asian nations) in the recognition of the country, however, the current administration has yet to prioritize the issue due to an ongoing drug war and a shift to federalism.

Before California recognized Nagorno-Karabakh in May 2014, three places within the state had already recognized it:

- Fresno County (April 2013)
- Highland (November 2013)
- Los Angeles (January 2014)

In addition, Highland is twinned with Berdzor and Montebello is twinned with Stepanakert.

In November 2019, the French Communist Party urged the French Government to recognize the independence of Artsakh. On 25 November 2020, the French Senate adopted a resolution to recognize the independence of Artsakh.

On 15 October 2020, the Italian city of Milan became the first ever large European city to recognize the Republic of Artsakh. On 3 November 2020, the city of Palermo, as well as Asolo, Cerchiara di Calabria, and the Italian region of Lombardy followed.

On 24 October 2020, Nadia de León, the President of the Central American Parliament announced her support for the right of self-determination of Artsakh.

On 5 November 2020, the city of Laval in Quebec recognized the independence of Artsakh.

On 13 November 2020, the legislature of Uruguay's Montevideo Department unanimously recognized the independence of the Republic of Artsakh.

== Visa requirements for Artsakh citizens ==
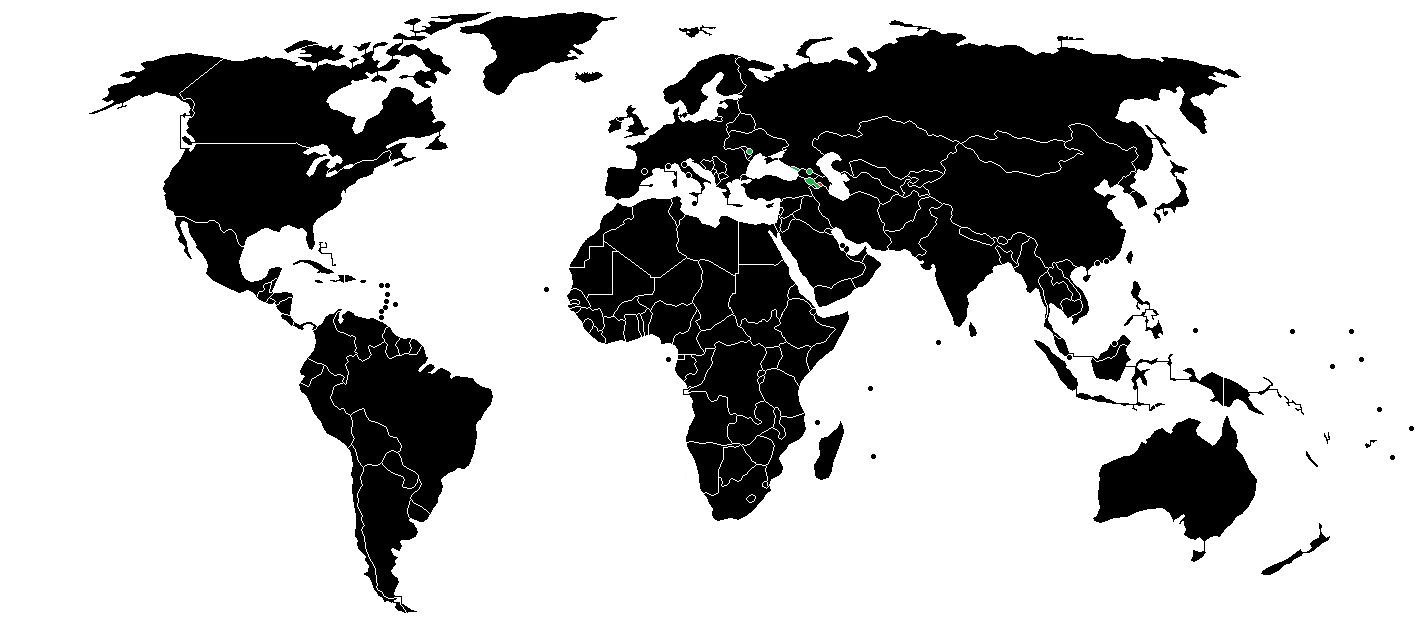
Visa requirements for Artsakh citizens Artsakh Visa free access Admission refused

As Artsakh was not recognized by the majority of countries of the world (with the exceptions of Abkhazia, South Ossetia and Transnistria, all of which are also mostly unrecognized), an Artsakh passport was not valid for travel to most countries in the world. However, as dual nationality is permitted, most citizens of Artsakh were entitled to an Armenian passport.

All members of the Community for Democracy and Rights of Nations have agreed to abolish visa requirements for each other's citizens. Artsakh passports could be used to travel to South Ossetia and Transnistria. Artsakh signed a visa-waiver agreement with Abkhazia on 22 February 2016 and the agreement went into effect on 1 April 2016. Citizens of Artsakh could also travel visa-free to neighboring Armenia.

== Inter-parliamentary relations ==
- On 26 February 2013, a parliamentary friendship group was established between the Republic of Artsakh and the Parliament of Lithuania.
- On 19 March 2013, a parliamentary friendship group was established with parliament members and senators of France.
- In October 2014, a parliamentary friendship group was established between Artsakh and the European Parliament.
- In October 2017, parliamentary friendship groups were established with both the Parliament of Wallonia and Flemish Parliament in Belgium.
- On 19 March 2019, an Artsakh-Canada Friendship Group was established between the National Assembly of Artsakh and the House of Commons of Canada.
- On 1 August 2019, an Artsakh-Australia Friendship Group was established between Artsakh and various Australian politicians including Federal Parliament Senators and Ministers, as well as the Premier of the State of New South Wales.
- On 8 December 2019, Artsakh National Assembly Speaker Ashot Ghulyan received First Vice President of Guatemala’s Congress, Felipe Alejos Lorenzana. The sides discussed establishing inter-parliamentary ties.
- In June 2020, a parliamentary friendship group was established between the Republic of Artsakh and members of the Parliament of Cyprus.

== International organisation participation ==
- The Republic of Artsakh was a member of one international organization, the Community for Democracy and Human Rights, also commonly known as the Commonwealth of Unrecognized States.
- The Republic of Artsakh also maintained contacts with the OSCE Minsk Group established in 1992 by the Organization for Security and Co-operation in Europe to encourage a peaceful, negotiated resolution to the conflict between Azerbaijan and Armenia over Artsakh.
- In October 2017, the President of Artsakh, Bako Sahakyan visited the European Friends of Armenia (EuFoA) headquarters in Belgium. A number of issues were discussed including relations between Artsakh and the EU. The President thanked EuFoA for reinforcing ties between Artsakh and various pan-European structures.
- In March 2019, the Speaker of the National Assembly (Artsakh), Ashot Ghulian met with European Parliament members in Brussels, during which he explored opportunities to include Artsakh in European Union programs. The Speaker also highlighted the necessity to maintain and promote cooperation between the two sides.
- Artsakh officials also had regular contact with the Council of Europe. In October 2019, the Human Rights Defender of the Republic of Artsakh, Artak Beglaryan, held a number of meetings with high-ranking officials of the Council of Europe in Strasbourg. Possible areas of cooperation between Artsakh and the Parliamentary Assembly of the Council of Europe as well as the need to ensure international engagement of unrecognized states was discussed.

=== International conventions ===
In addition to the above, Artsakh was also a signatory to several international conventions and treaties, including:

- International Covenant on Civil and Political Rights
- International Covenant on Economic, Social and Cultural Rights
- European Convention on Human Rights

== Representative offices ==
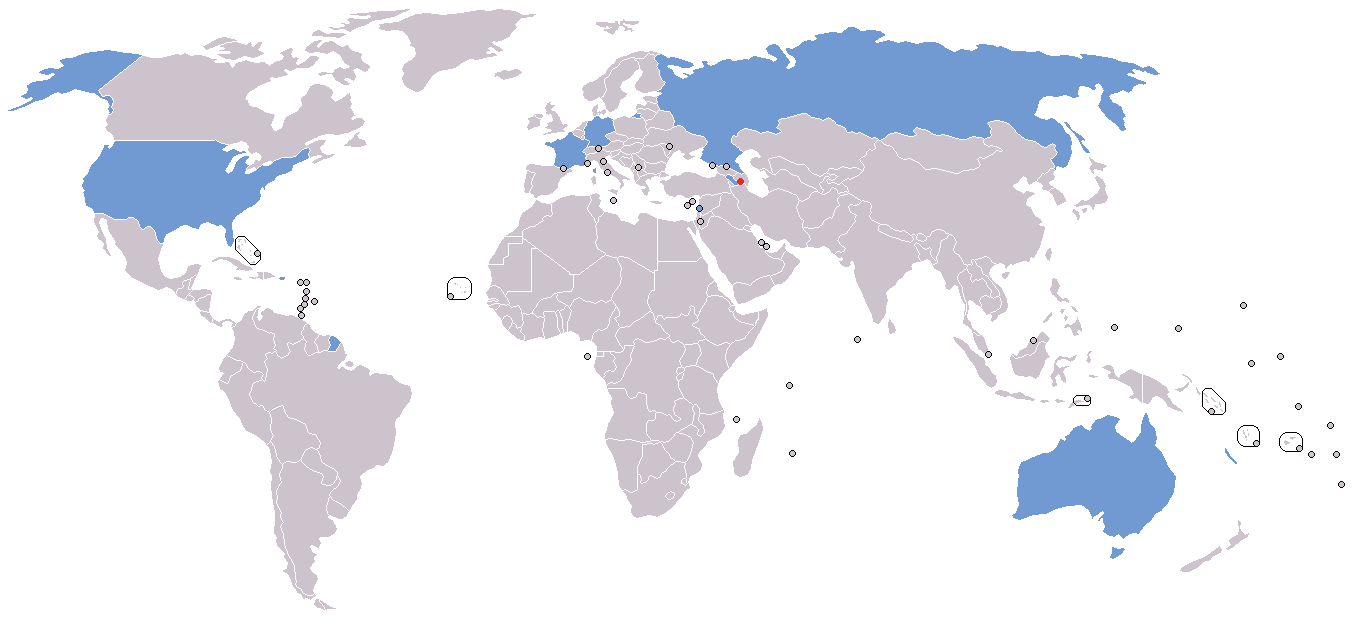
Countries with Republic of Artsakh representative offices

Artsakh maintained several representative offices abroad:

- Armenia (Yerevan)
- Australia (Sydney)
- France (Paris)
- Germany (Berlin)
- Lebanon (Beirut)
  - Also responsible for the rest of the Middle East
- Russia (Moscow)
- United States (Washington D.C.)
  - Also accredited to Canada

== Participation in international sports federations ==
- The Artsakh Football Association was a member of Confederation of Independent Football Associations.
  - Artsakh participated in the 2014 ConIFA World Football Cup in Sweden, the 2015 ConIFA European Football Cup in Hungary and the 2016 ConIFA World Football Cup in Abkhazia
  - In June 2019, the 2019 CONIFA European Football Cup was hosted in Artsakh.
- Artsakh and its citizens also participated in the Pan-Armenian Games.

== Twin towns and sister cities ==
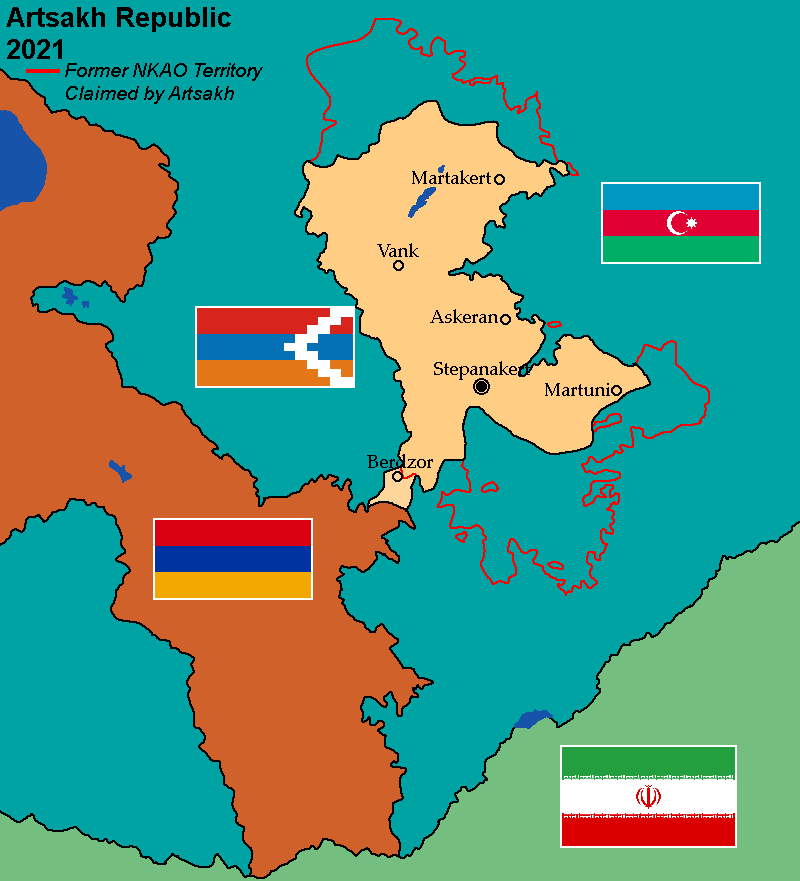
Map of Artsakh with major settlements labeled

There were numerous settlements in the territory with standing links to local communities in other countries. These links are known as "town twinning" (usually in Europe) or "sister cities" (usually in the rest of the world).

- Lachin — Highland, United States
- Martakert — Vagarshapat, Armenia
- Martuni — Les Pennes-Mirabeau, France
- Stepanakert — Franco da Rocha, Brazil, Mairiporã, Brazil, and Montebello, United States

== See also ==
- Artsakh passport
- Community for Democracy and Rights of Nations
- Foreign relations of Armenia
- Political status of Artsakh
- Politics of Artsakh
- Politics of Europe
- Visa policy of Artsakh
