= Eric Lohr =

Eric Lohr is the former chair of the department of history at American University.

== Works ==
- Lohr, Eric (2003). Nationalizing the Russian Empire: The Campaign Against Enemy Aliens During World War I. Harvard University Press. ISBN 978-0-674-01041-3.
- Lohr, Eric (2012). Russian Citizenship: From Empire to Soviet Union. Harvard University Press. ISBN 978-0-674-06780-6.
