= Armenian passport =

Travel document

Armenian passport Հայկական անձնագիր
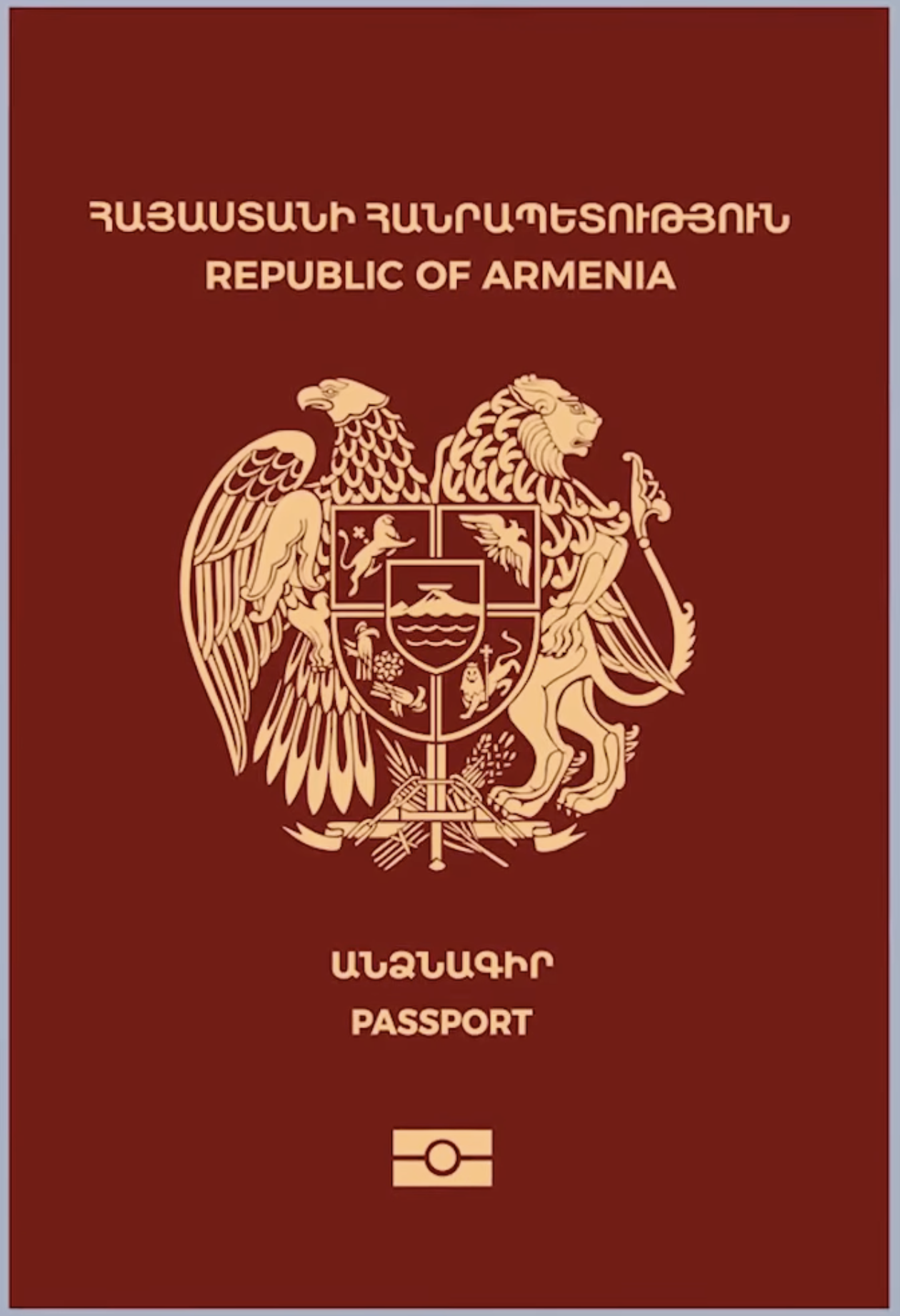
- The front cover of the future Armenian Biometric Passport, expected in November, 2026

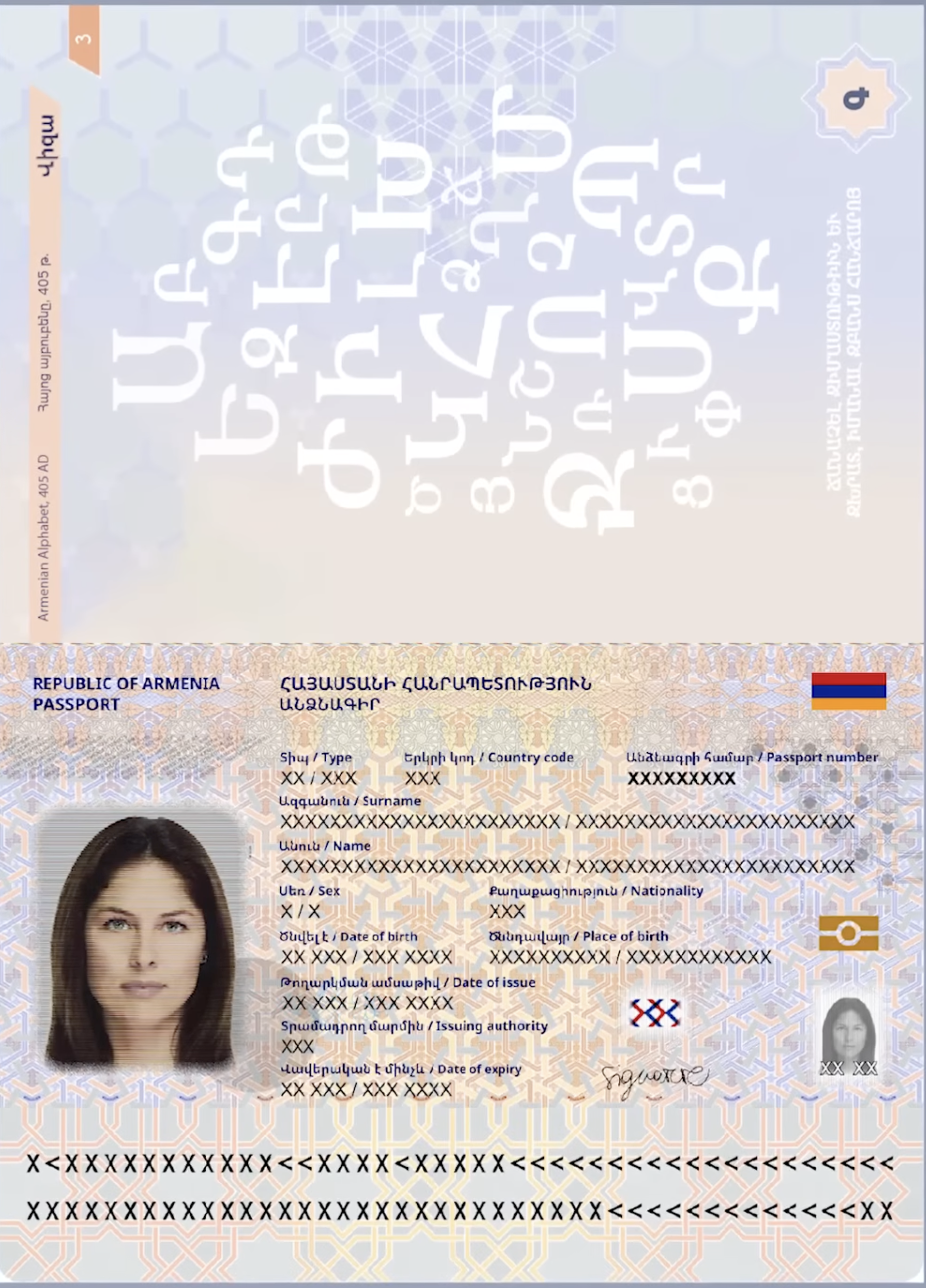
- Front personal-information page of new Armenian biometric passports, since 2026
- Type: Passport
- Issued by: Armenia
- First issued: 1994 (first version); 2012 (second version); 2026 (current version)
- Purpose: Identification & International Travel
- Eligibility: Armenian citizenship
- Expiration: 10 years after issuance
- Cost: 28 650 ֏

Armenian ID card
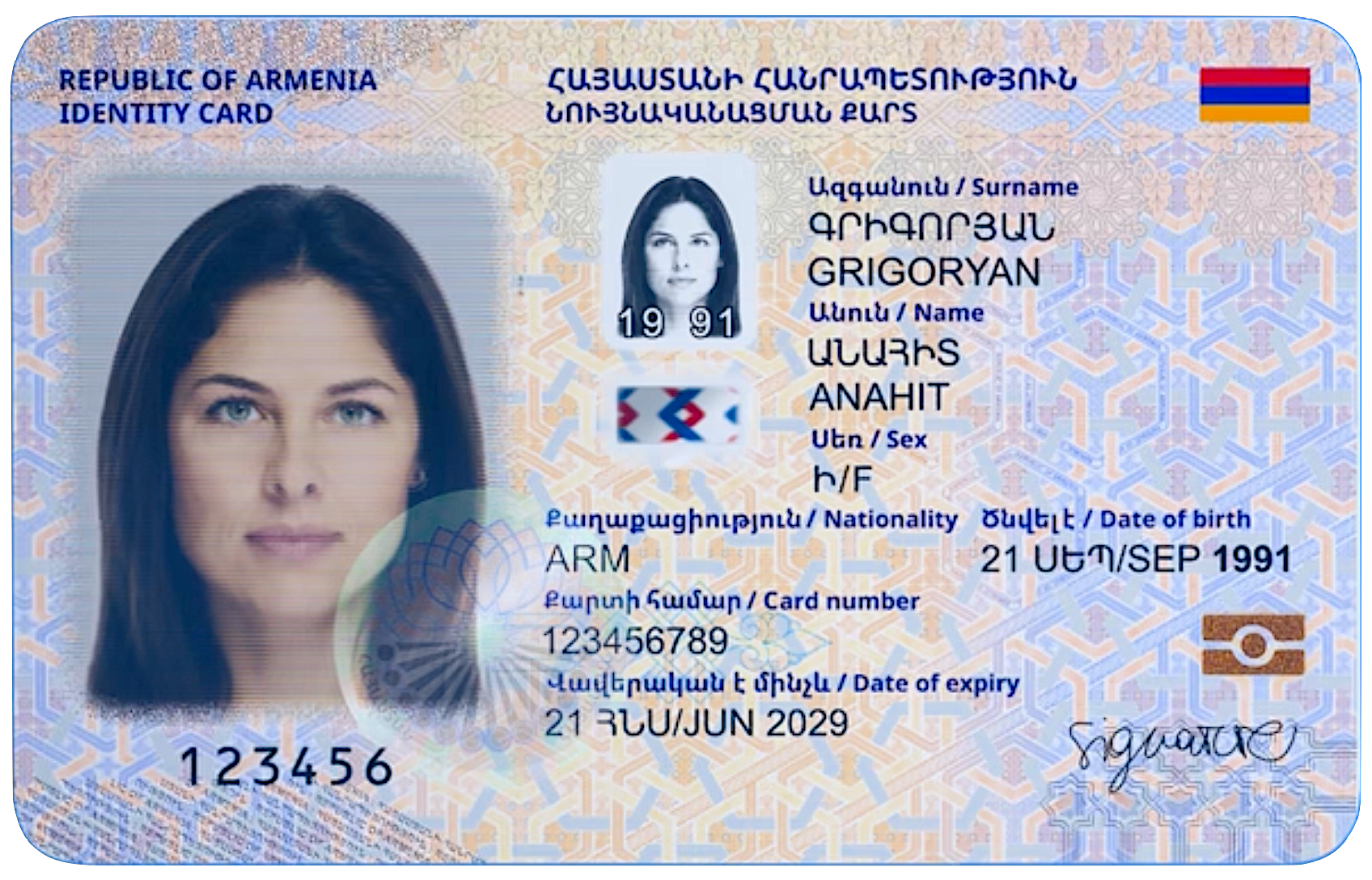
- Proposed design of the new Armenian biometric ID card, since 2026
- Type: ID Card
- Issued by: Armenia
- Purpose: Identification & International Travel
- Eligibility: Armenian citizenship
- Expiration: 5 years after issuance
- Cost: 5 950 ֏

The Armenian passport (Armenian: Հայկական անձնագիր, romanized: Haykakan andznagir) is a passport issued to Armenian citizens to enable them to travel outside Armenia, and entitles the bearer to the protection of Armenia's consular officials overseas. Armenian citizens have visa-free or visa on arrival access to 65 countries and territories as of 2023.

Between 1994 and 2005, all Soviet Union passports were completely replaced with Armenian passports, invalidating Soviet Union passports' use in Armenia since 2005. Today, Armenian passports are also used as proof of identity within the country, along with Armenian ID cards.

== Physical appearance ==
A biometric Armenian passport is dark red (previously blue), with the Armenian coat of arms emblazoned in gold in the center of the front cover. The words Հայաստանի Հանրապետություն "Republic of Armenia" and Անձնագիր "Passport" in Armenian and English languages also appear on the front cover. The passport is valid for 10 years from the time of issue, with the further possibility of extending validity for an additional 5 years. The possibility of extending the passport by 5 years was eliminated in August 2017. It contains 32 pages for special notes and visas, and information about its holder in both the Armenian and English languages.

Since 1 June 2012, two new ID-documents were introduced, which replaced the ordinary passports of Armenian citizens. One of the documents – the ID card — to be used locally within the country, and the second document – the biometric passport — to be used for traveling abroad. An electronic chip on the passport will contain digital images of fingerprints and photo of passport holder. Both biometric passports and eID cards are produced by Polish Security Printing Works (Polska Wytwornia Papierow Wartosciowych). Old style (non-biometric) passports were re-introduced in 2016 on a temporary basis (until 1 January 2019).

As of 2023, the process of issuing biometric passports and ID cards was largely suspended due to the expiration of the contract with the Polish firm responsible for producing the chips. In September 2024, it was announced that the Armenian government had initiated a tender to find a new company to issue biometric passports and ID cards. The tender was finalized in March 2025, with the French company IDEMIA being chosen as the winner. The new system of biometric passports and ID cards is expected to be rolled out in the second half of 2026. The new system will be aligned with EU standards, aiding Armenia's goals in European integration and visa liberalization. The new design for the biometric passports and the colour change was announced in April 2026, with the new system becoming available in September 2026.

=== Identity information page ===
Armenian Passport includes the following data:

- Անձնագրի սեփականատիրոջ լուսանկարը / Photo of Passport Holder
- Տեսակը (P) / Type (P)
- Երկրի կոդը (ARM) / Country Code (ARM)
- Անձնագրի համարը / Passport No.
- Ազգանունը / Surname (1)
- Անունը/անունները / Given Names (2)
- Ազգությունը / Nationality (3)
- Ծննդյան ամսաթիվը / Date of Birth (4)
- Սեռը / Sex (5)
- Ծննդավայրը / Country of Birth (6)
- ամսաթիվը թողարկման / Date of Issue (7)
- Ամսաթվի թողարկումը / Date of Expiry (8)
- Կատարող մարմնի կոդը / Issuing Authority code (9)

=== Limitations on passport use ===
As a result of the first Nagorno-Karabakh War between Artsakh, Armenia and Azerbaijan, Azerbaijan refuses entry to holders of Armenian passports, as well as passport-holders of any other country if they are of Armenian descent. It also strictly refuses entry to foreigners in general whose passport shows evidence of entry into the Republic of Artsakh, immediately declaring them permanent personae non gratae.

=== Gallery ===
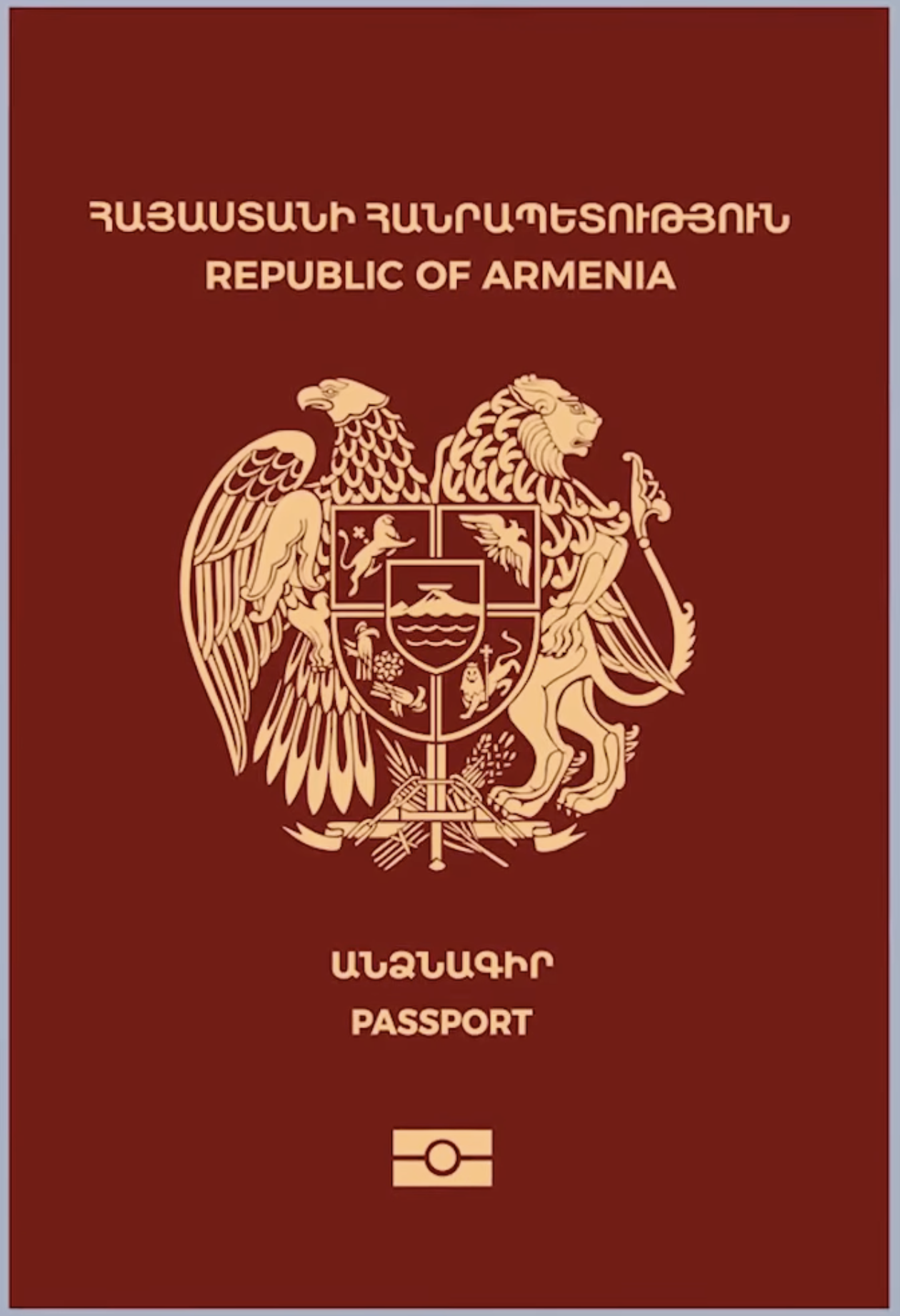
Biometric re-design (Fall 2026 onward)

Biometric Passport (First design, 2012-2023), front cover

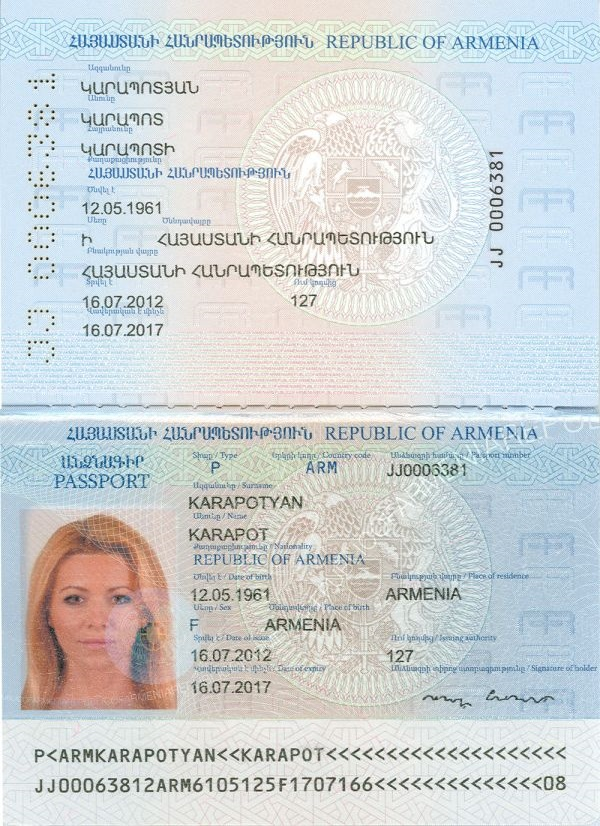
Biometric passport (First design, 2012-2023), personal data page

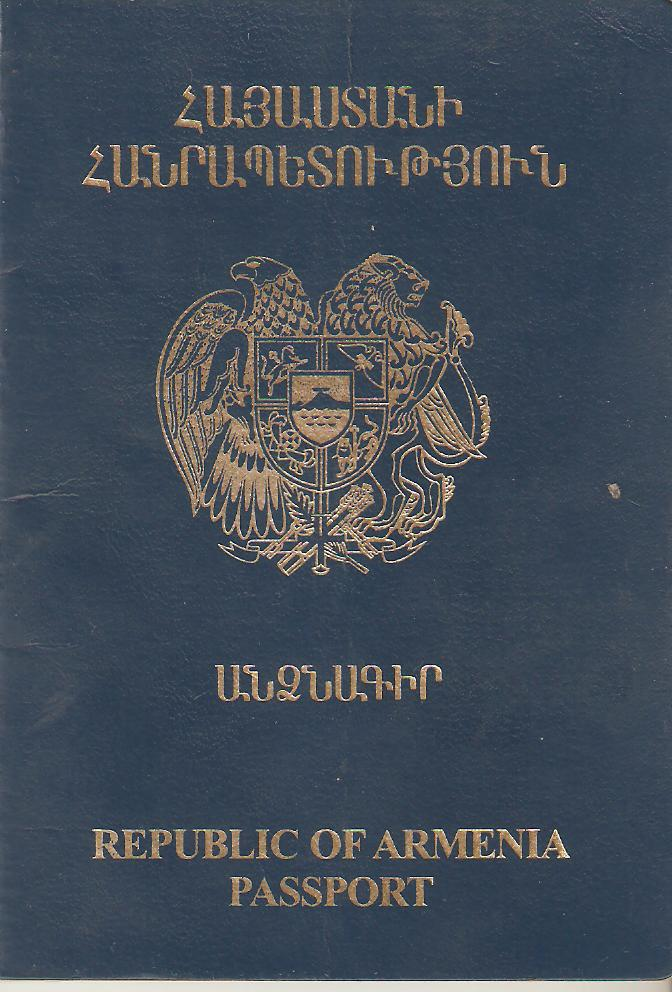
Non-biometric passport (1994-2012, and 2023-current time), front cover

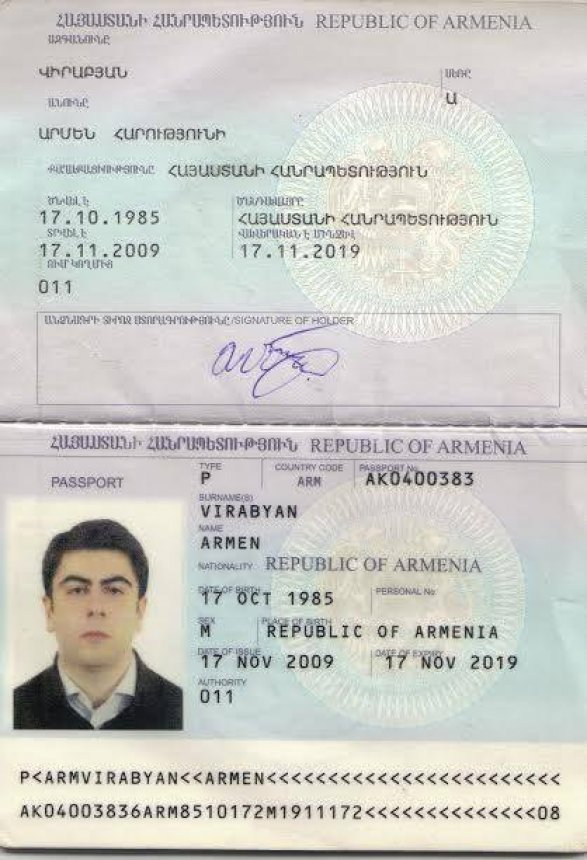
Non-biometric passport (1994-2012, and 2023-current time), personal data page

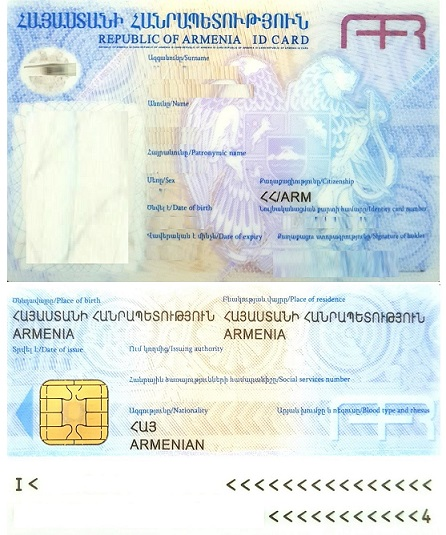
Armenian ID card (2012-2026)

=== New Biometric Passport (2026) ===
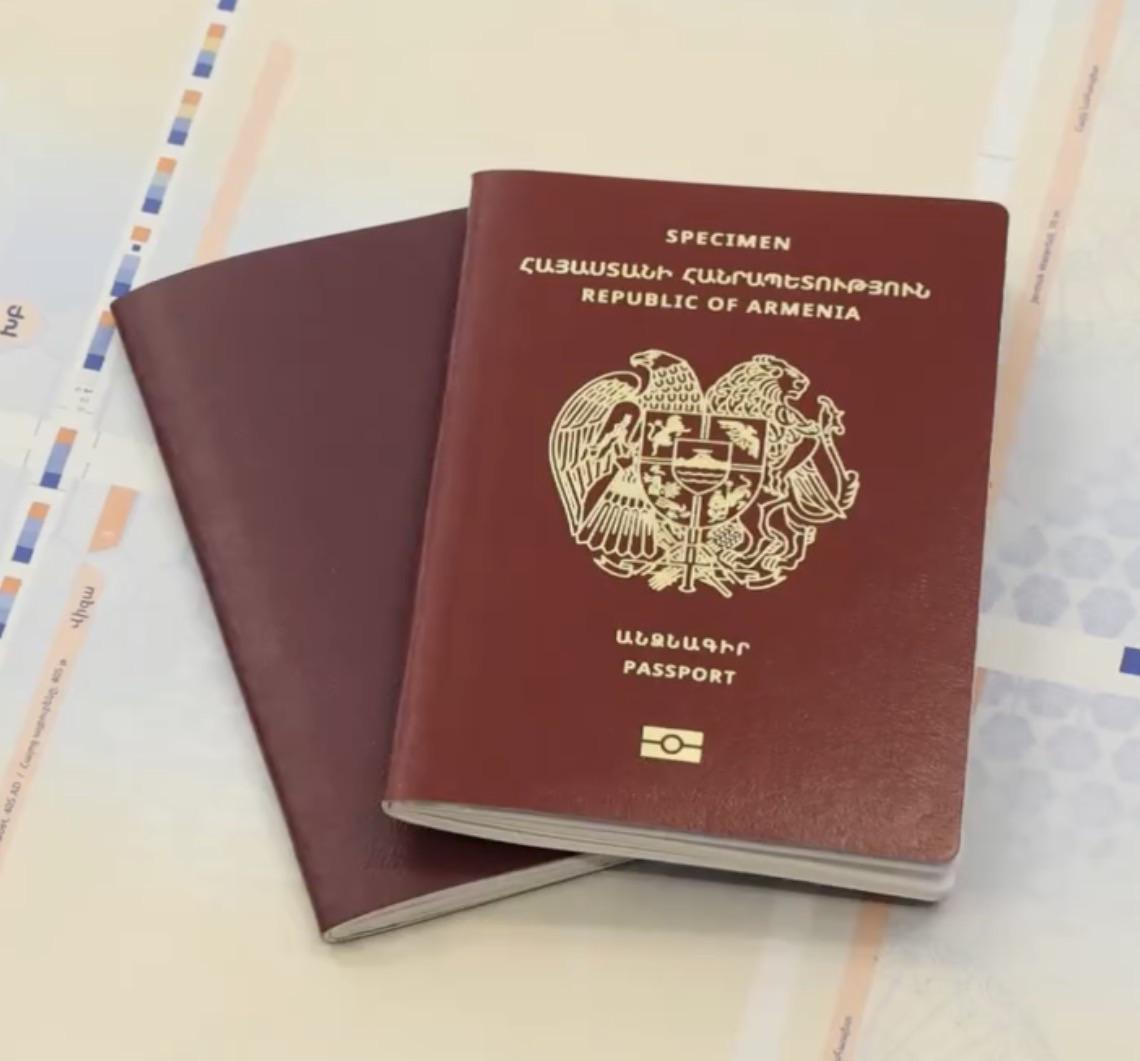
2026 Re-design (Specimen)

In April 2025, the Armenian Ministry of Internal Affairs signed an agreement with HAYPASS CJSC, a joint venture established in 2024 between IDEMIA Identity Security France and A.C.I. Technology S.à.r.l., to implement a new biometric passport and ID card system. HAYPASS will operate and maintain the platform under an 11-year contract, while regulatory authority remains with the Ministry of Internal Affairs. IDEMIA's consortium was selected through a competitive tender, scoring 94.97 out of 100 points, ahead of a competing bid from AUGENTIC GmbH and Portugal's Imprensa Nacional – Casa da Moeda, which scored 79.24.

Issuance was originally planned for earlier in 2026 but was postponed to the autumn, with Prime Minister Nikol Pashinyan confirming a fall 2026 launch. The legal framework supporting the rollout was approved by the National Assembly in early 2026, and production of biometric ID cards for foreign residents and stateless persons began in November 2025 as a preparatory phase.

==== Design and security features ====
The new passports store the holder's facial image, fingerprints and digital security data on an embedded contactless chip, and comply with ICAO Doc 9303 for machine-readable travel documents. The visual design draws on Armenian cultural and historical motifs, including depictions of Hayk Nahapet, petroglyphs from the Geghama Mountains and Ukhtasar, the cuneiform inscription marking the founding of Yerevan, boundary stones from the Artaxiad period, the Mother See of Holy Etchmiadzin, and regional symbols such as the lavash-baking tradition and the deer of Jermuk.

The illustrated visa pages carry a second layer of artwork visible only under ultraviolet light, in which fluorescent motifs such as stars and birds appear and a luminous line traces the upper contours of the printed scenes, following the rooflines of the buildings depicted on the page. The paper is seeded with security fibres in the colours of the Armenian flag, and held against the light it reveals a multi-tone watermark of the national coat of arms.

The polycarbonate data page carries a colour portrait produced with IDEMIA's LASINK laser-engraving technology, in which a pre-printed matrix of fine continuous colour lines is engraved into the core of the substrate; because ordinary digital printers reproduce images as dots rather than continuous lines, forgeries can be distinguished under a magnifying glass or by optical machine authentication. A secondary greyscale portrait with a three-dimensional depth effect is engraved alongside it, personalised with the holder's date of birth, together with an optically variable element in the national colours that shifts as the booklet is tilted, microtext, and tactile relief elements.

==== Eligibility and cost ====
Under the new framework, biometric ID cards are mandatory for Armenian citizens aged 16 and older. Children between the ages of 6 and 16 may be issued biometric ID cards upon parental request, while children under 6 will continue to use birth certificates as their primary form of identification. An ID card is also required to obtain a biometric passport. The fee for a biometric passport has been set at 28,650 drams, up from the previous 25,000 drams, while the fee for a biometric ID card has been set at 5,950 drams, up from 3,000 drams. The new passports are issued for a validity period of 10 years and the new ID cards for 5 years.

==== Connection to EU visa liberalisation ====
The biometric programme is described by the Ministry of Internal Affairs as a cornerstone of Armenia's Visa Liberalisation Action Plan with the European Union, formal dialogue for which began in September 2024. Alongside the new documents, Armenia is introducing automated, contactless border-crossing systems at international checkpoints, designed to interoperate with the EU's Entry/Exit System.

== Visa requirements ==
Visa requirements for Armenian citizens Armenia Visa free Visa issued upon arrival eVisa Visa available both on arrival or online Visa required prior to arrival Admission refused

- As of April 2025, Armenian citizens had visa-free or visa on arrival access to 68 countries and territories, ranking the Armenian passport 72nd in the world according to the Henley Passport Index.
- Holders of an Armenian passport may enter all Commonwealth of Independent States and Eurasian Economic Union member states without a visa (except Azerbaijan).
- The former Head of the EU Delegation to Armenia, Ambassador Piotr Świtalski stated that, the action plan for beginning visa liberalization between Armenia and the EU will be on the agenda of the next Eastern Partnership summit in 2017 and dialogue for visa-free travel of Armenian citizens to the EU's Schengen Area will begin in early 2018. The former Ambassador also stated that Armenian citizens could be granted visa-free travel to the EU by 2020.
- As of 1 January 2013, Armenia dropped the requirement of entry visas for citizens of all 27 EU member states as well as the 4 members of the European Free Trade Association (Iceland, Liechtenstein, Norway and Switzerland). By approving the unilateral abolition of visas for EU and EFTA citizens, Armenia seeks to accelerate negotiations with the EU on visa-free travel for Armenian citizens travelling to the Schengen Area in return. According to the planned agreement with the EU, the current procedure for obtaining Schengen visas for citizens of Armenia would be relaxed, until visa-free travel is finalized. The new simplified procedure is provided for members of official delegations, researchers and students, journalists, those in sports or the arts, and for close relatives of citizens legally residing in the EU. It is also intended to reduce visa costs by 35 euros or free for these categories, as well as for children and pensioners. For more info see: E-visa system.

== See also ==
- Artsakh passport
- Foreign relations of Armenia
- List of citizenships refused entry to foreign states
- List of passports
- Visa policy of Armenia
- Visa requirements for Armenian citizens
