= Community for Democracy and Rights of Nations =

Organization of unrecognized states

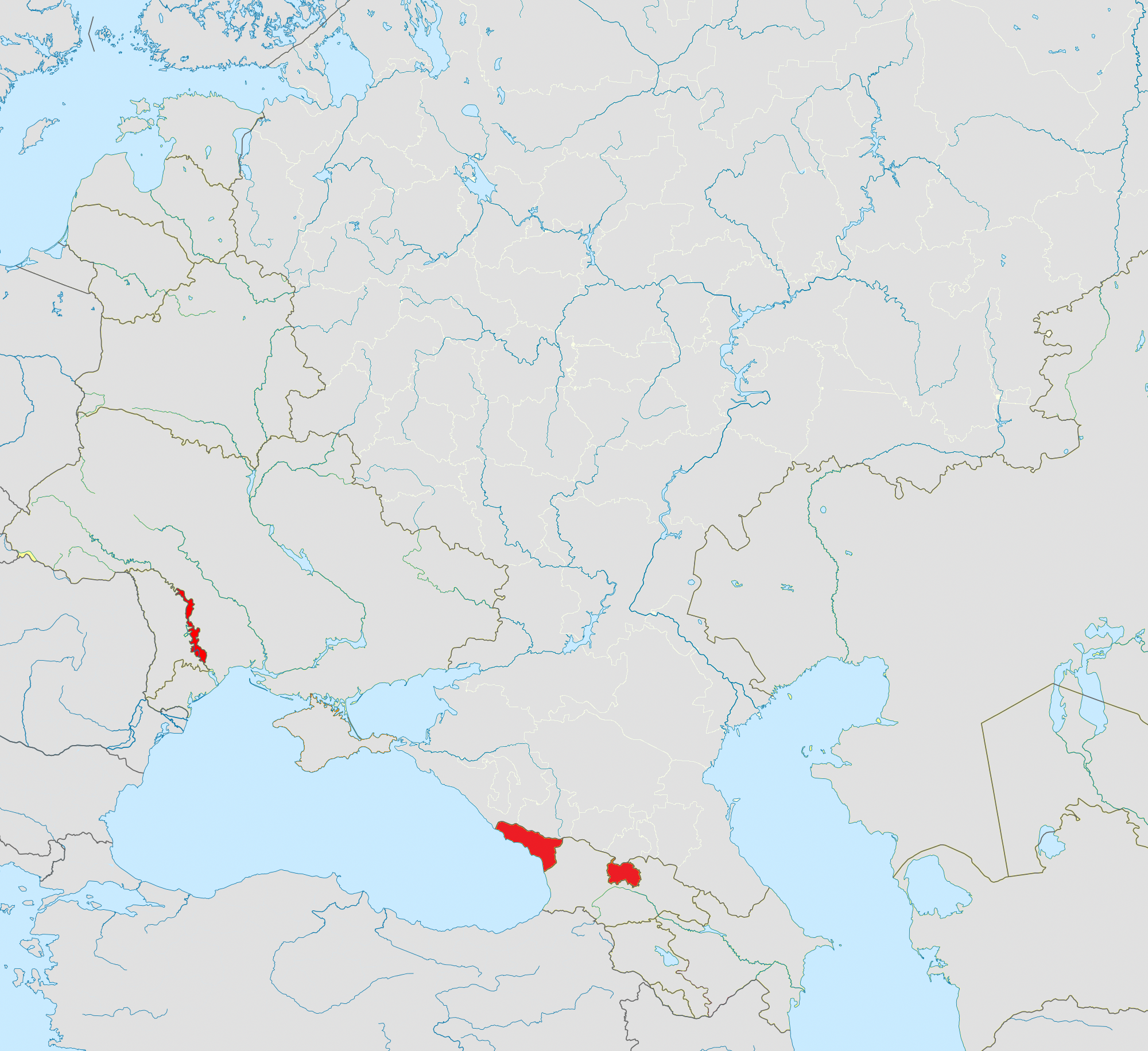
- Map of Eastern Europe and the South Caucasus with the member states of the Community for Democracy and Rights of Nations, from left to right: Transnistria, Abkhazia, South Ossetia (red).
- Abbreviation: CDR / CIS-2
- Formation: 14 June 2006; 20 years ago
- Type: Political co-operation organization
- Location(s): Eastern Europe; South Caucasus
- Members: Abkhazia; South Ossetia; Transnistria
- Website: community-dpr.org at the Wayback Machine (archived 2014-05-17)

The Community for Democracy and Rights of Nations, (Note: Russian: Сообщество за демократию и права народов, romanized: Soobshchestvo za demokratiyu u prava narodov) also commonly and colloquially known as the Commonwealth of Unrecognized States, (Note: Russian: Содружество непризнанных государств, romanized: Sodruzhestvo nepriznannykh gosudarstv) rarely as CIS-2, (Note: Russian: СНГ-2) is an international organization in Eastern Europe and the South Caucasus of three breakaway states in the territory of the former Soviet Union, all of which have limited to no recognition from the international community.

== History ==
=== Background ===
A clickable Euler diagram showing the relationships among various supranational organisations in the territory of the former Soviet Union

An agreement on creating the commonwealth was reached by the four separatist states of the Pridnestrovian Moldavian Republic (Transnistria), the Republic of Abkhazia, the Republic of Nagorno-Karabakh, and the Republic of South Ossetia in 2001 at the foreign ministers meeting held in Stepanakert, the capital of Nagorno-Karabakh. The Community for Democracy and Human Rights was established on 14 June 2006 in Sokhumi, the capital of Abkhazia, by the presidents of three of these states: Sergei Bagapsh representing Abkhazia, Eduard Kokoity representing South Ossetia, and Igor Smirnov representing Transnistria. Nagorno-Karabakh, which had been a part of the 2001 agreement, left in 2004 but became a member state in 2007. All member states have had limited international recognition: Abkhazia and South Ossetia are located within the internationally recognized territory of Georgia, Nagorno-Karabakh - also known as Artsakh - was within Azerbaijan, and Transnistria is within Moldova. All of them were secured by the presence of Russian military forces.

=== 2000–2005 ===
The first step towards co-operation between Abkhazia and Transnistria was taken immediately after the end of the Abkhazian-Georgian War when their foreign ministries signed the first co-operation agreement. Then, in Tiraspol from 20-22 November 2000, the Foreign Ministers of Abkhazia, Nagorno-Karabakh, South Ossetia, and Transnistria decided to establish a permanent coordinating body – the Meeting of Foreign Ministers. According to another source, the body was called the Committee of Foreign Ministers of Unrecognized States, and the agreement on creating it was signed during the meeting. In addition, an expert-level advisory council was created to carry out preparatory work between meetings, which should be held at least twice a year.

For the next meeting of the foreign ministers of Abkhazia, Nagorno-Karabakh, Transnistria, and South Ossetia, which took place in Stepanakert (Note: According to the administrative division of the unrecognized Republic of Nagorno-Karabakh) (Khankendi) (Note: According to the administrative division of Azerbaijan) on 2-3 July 2001, the advisory council developed regulations for the organization, which were adopted at the meeting. A Joint Statement and a Final Communiqué were adopted. Observers assessed the appearance of the conference mostly with skepticism, with Nezavisimaya Gazeta referring to it as the "Union of the Marginalized". Initially, there was also a proposal to name the conference NATO-2 (Nagorno-Karabakh Republic, Abkhazia, Transnistria, and Ossetia).

On 22 August 2001, a Protocol on co-operation and consultations between the Ministries of Foreign Affairs of the Republic of Abkhazia and the Pridnestrovian Moldavian Republic was signed in Sokhumi. The Protocol is one of a number of documents regulating relations between the two republics at the diplomatic level. After Stepanakert, the name CIS-2 (Commonwealth of Unrecognized States) became widespread, and the founders began using it. For example, in 2005, the head of the Foreign Ministry of the Pridnestrovian Moldavian Republic contrasted the CIS-2 and GUAM.

Subsequently, this gave rise to writing in the press that the idea of creating the CIS-2 at one time originated in Stepanakert. A number of meetings were held within the framework of the CIS-2. Thus, in March 2002, the heads of the unrecognized states held a meeting in Tiraspol to coordinate their actions within the framework of the CIS-2 bloc they created. In September 2002, the head of the foreign policy department of South Ossetia announced the possibility of creating a military bloc in the future by the unrecognized states that arose on the territory of the former USSR.

In March 2005, the Russian State Duma considered, but refused to accept, a bill proposed by deputies of the Rodina faction on amendments to the previously adopted constitutional law "On the procedure for admitting to Russia and forming a new subject of the Russian Federation within it." According to the bill, former Soviet autonomies could become part of Russia based on the will of the people living in this territory without concluding an international treaty with the post-Soviet state they are a part of. According to Dmitry Rogozin, Andrey Savelyev, and Natalia Narochnitskaya, who prepared the bill, this could solve the problems of Transnistria, Abkhazia, and South Ossetia.

According to Andrei Savelyev, the bill could "correct historical injustice": during the collapse of the USSR, the republican authorities ("small metropolises") did not hold referendums on secession from the USSR in the autonomous entities (future unrecognized states), thus violating the 1977 Constitution of the Soviet Union in force at that time, and referendums on the independence of the "small metropolises" did not take place in the autonomies themselves. However, the bill received negative opinions from the State Duma Committees on International Affairs and Federation Affairs and Regional Policy. During the voting, Rodina's initiative was supported only by the Communist Party of the Russian Federation. The Liberal Democratic Party of Russia and United Russia refused to participate in the vote.

In 2005, after much bickering, Russia agreed to the Georgian plan for resolving the Georgian–Ossetian conflict and to Viktor Yushchenko's "road map" for resolving the Transnistria conflict, which was called a turning point in Russian policy towards the CIS-2. A meeting of the heads of the Republic of Abkhazia, the Pridnestrovian Moldavian Republic, and South Ossetia was planned for 22 April 2005. According to Valeriy Litskai, the head of the Transnistrian Foreign Ministry, "The meeting is dictated by the changing political situation, in particular plans for the expansion of GUAM. <…> I think that GUAM will receive an adequate response from CIS-2." At the last moment, the summit was postponed to July.

=== 2006–present ===
On 17 June 2007, the four-state Community for Democracy and Peoples' Rights signed in Tiraspol—the capital of Transnistria—the joint Declaration on principles of peaceful and fair settlement of the Abkhazian–Georgian, Nagorno-Karabakh–Azeri, Georgian–Ossetian, and Moldovan–Transnistrian conflicts. It calls for barring all types of pressure, such as military deployments, diplomatic isolation, economic blockades, or information wars, during negotiations toward resolution of conflicts. It also calls for external guarantees to eventual political settlements of these conflicts.

On 27 September 2009 three members of the Community for Democracy and Peoples' Rights (all but Nagorno-Karabakh) agreed to abolish the visa regimes for their citizens. The agreement came into effect one month after its ratification by all three parliaments. It lasted for five years, after which it was automatically extended for another five-year term.

As of 2017, the four member states had a combined population of 947,480 people. Abkhazia and South Ossetia have secured recognition from UN member states such as Nauru, Nicaragua, Russia, Syria, and Venezuela, as well as the Sahrawi Arab Democratic Republic. Meanwhile, political leaders of Abkhazia, South Ossetia, and Transnistria have all promised to integrate their economies and perhaps seek membership in the Russian-led Eurasian Economic Union.

On 19 September 2023, Azerbaijan launched a military offensive against Artsakh and regained control over the entire territory. While Artsakh effectively ceased to exist, its authorities went into exile in Yerevan, Armenia.

== Member states ==
=== Current ===
- Abkhazia
- South Ossetia
- Pridnestrovian Moldavian Republic (Transnistria)

=== Former ===
- Artsakh (2007–2024)

== Administrative centres ==
=== Current ===
- Sukhumi, Abkhazia
- Tiraspol, Transnistria
- Tskhinvali, South Ossetia

=== Former ===
- Stepanakert, Artsakh

== See also ==
- Commonwealth of Independent States
- Post-Soviet states
- Community of Democracies
- Community of Democratic Choice
- Eastern Partnership
- Eurasian Economic Union
- Euronest Parliamentary Assembly
- European integration
- Foreign relations of Artsakh
- GUAM Organization for Democracy and Economic Development
- List of active separatist movements in Europe
- Politics of Europe
- Regions of Europe
- Self-determination
- South Caucasus
- Unrepresented Nations and Peoples Organization
