= Index of Artsakh-related articles =

This page lists in alphabetical order articles related to the Republic of Artsakh and Nagorno-Karabakh region. For a topically arranged list of articles, please see Outline of the Republic of Artsakh.

== # ==
- 1991 Nagorno-Karabakh independence referendum
- 1991 Nagorno-Karabakh parliamentary election
- 1995 Nagorno-Karabakh parliamentary election
- 1996 Nagorno-Karabakh presidential election
- 1997 Nagorno-Karabakh presidential election
- 2000 Nagorno-Karabakh parliamentary election
- 2006 Nagorno-Karabakh constitutional referendum
- 2015 Nagorno-Karabakh parliamentary election
- 2016 Nagorno-Karabakh conflict
- 2017 Nagorno-Karabakh constitutional referendum
- 2020 Artsakhian general election
- 2020 Nagorno-Karabakh war
- 2020 Nagorno-Karabakh ceasefire agreement
- 2022 Artsakh blockade
- 2023 Artsakhian presidential election
- 2023 Azerbaijani offensive in Nagorno-Karabakh
- 2023 Nagorno-Karabakh ceasefire agreement

== A ==
- Administrative divisions of the Republic of Artsakh
- Amaras Monastery
- Aras Valley campaign
- Arayik Harutyunyan
- Armenia
- Armenia–Artsakh relations
- Armenia–Azerbaijan border crisis
- Armenians
- Armenian Apostolic Church
- Armenian-occupied territories surrounding Nagorno-Karabakh
- Armenian dram
- Armenian language
- Armenian prisoners of the Second Nagorno-Karabakh War
- Armenian Revolutionary Federation
- Artsakh
- Artsakhbank
- Artsakh Defense Army
- Artsakh dram
- Artsakh national football team
- Artsakh University
- Artsakh passport
- Artsakh Public TV
- Artsakh Republican Party
- Artsakh State Museum
- Artsakh State University
- Artsakh–Transnistria relations
- Artsakh–United States relations
- Artsakh Wine Fest
- Artur Mkrtchyan
- Askeran District (NKAO)
- Askeran Province
- Azat Artsakh
- Azerbaijan
- Azerbaijani administrative divisions of Nagorno-Karabakh
- Azerbaijani Community of Nagorno-Karabakh

== B ==
- Baker rules
- Bako Sahakyan
- Battle of Shusha (1992)
- Battle of Shusha (2020)
- Bishkek Protocol
- Blockade of Nagorno-Karabakh

== C ==
- Battle of Shusha (1992)
- Caucasus
- Caucasus Viceroyalty (1801–1917)
- Chartar (town)
- Climate of Nagorno-Karabakh
- Coat of arms of the Republic of Artsakh
- Communications in Nagorno-Karabakh
- Communist Party of Artsakh
- Community for Democracy and Rights of Nations
- Constitution of the Republic of Artsakh
- Culture of Artsakh

== D ==
- Dadivank Monastery
- Democratic Party of Artsakh
- Demographics of the Republic of Artsakh

== E ==
- Elections in Artsakh
- Elizavetpol Governorate
- Economy of the Republic of Artsakh

== F ==
- First Nagorno-Karabakh War
- Flag of the Republic of Artsakh
- Flight of Nagorno-Karabakh Armenians
- Foreign relations of Artsakh
- Free Motherland
- Free Motherland - UCA Alliance

== G ==
- Gandzasar monastery
- Ghazanchetsots Cathedral

== H ==
- Hadrut District (NKAO)
- Hadrut Province
- Hero of Artsakh
- History of Artsakh
- History of Nagorno-Karabakh (1915–1923)

== J ==
- Janapar
- Justice (Artsakh)

== K ==
- Karabakh
- Karabakh carpet
- Karabakh Committee
- Karabakh Council
- Karabakh Khanate
- Karabakh movement
- Kashatagh Province
- Khojavend District
- Khokhanaberd

== L ==
- Lachin
- Lachin corridor
- Land mine situation in Nagorno Karabakh
- Law enforcement in the Republic of Artsakh
- Law on Abolishment of Nagorno-Karabakh Autonomous Oblast
- Leonard Petrosyan
- Line of Contact (Nagorno-Karabakh)

== M ==
- Madrid Principles
- Mardakert (disambiguation)
- Mardakert District (NKAO)
- Martuni District (NKAO)
- Martuni Province
- Melikdoms of Karabakh
- Miatsum
- Military history of the Nagorno-Karabakh Republic
- Ministry of Internal Affairs (Artsakh)
- Movement 88
- Music of Artsakh

== N ==
- Nagorno-Karabakh Autonomous Oblast
- Nagorno-Karabakh conflict
- Nagorno-Karabakh constitutional referendum, 2006
- Nagorno-Karabakh parliamentary election, 2005
- Nagorno-Karabakh parliamentary election, 2010
- Nagorno-Karabakh presidential election, 2007
- Nagorno-Karabakh presidential election, 2002
- National Assembly of the Republic of Artsakh
- National Revival (Artsakh)

== O ==
- OSCE Minsk Group
- Organization for Security and Co-operation in Europe
- Outline of the Republic of Artsakh

== P ==
- Pan-Armenian National Movement
- Peacekeeping operations in Nagorno-Karabakh
- Political status of Artsakh
- Politics of Artsakh
- Post-Soviet conflicts
- Post-Soviet states
- Prague Process (Armenian–Azerbaijani negotiations)
- President of Artsakh
- President of the National Assembly of Artsakh
- Prime Minister of Artsakh
- Principality of Khachen
- Public holidays in the Republic of Artsakh

== R ==
- Religion in Artsakh
- Robert Kocharyan

== S ==
- Samvel Shahramanyan
- Scouting in Artsakh
- Second Nagorno-Karabakh War
- Self-determination
- Shahumyan Province
- Shusha
- Shushi Province
- Social Justice Party (Nagorno Karabakh)
- South Caucasus
- Soviet Union
- State Minister of Artsakh
- Stepanakert
- Stepanakert Airport
- Stepanakert Memorial
- Karen Grigory Sargsyan

== T ==
- Tehran Communiqué
- Tigranakert of Artsakh
- Timeline of Artsakh history
- Tourism in the Republic of Artsakh
- Transcaucasian Democratic Federative Republic

== U ==
- United Armenia
- United Armenia Party
- United Civic Alliance Party
- United Motherland
- United Nations Security Council Resolution 822
- United Nations Security Council Resolution 853
- United Nations Security Council Resolution 874
- United Nations Security Council Resolution 884

== V ==
- Vehicle registration plates of the Republic of Artsakh
- Visa policy of Artsakh
- Visa requirements for Artsakh citizens

== W ==
- We Are Our Mountains
- Women in Nagorno-Karabakh

== Y ==
- Yerits Mankants Monastery

== Z ==
- Zangezur uezd
- Zheleznovodsk Communiqué

== Lists ==
- List of airports in Nagorno-Karabakh
- List of Armenians from Nagorno-Karabakh
- List of Azerbaijanis from Nagorno-Karabakh
- List of cities and towns in Artsakh
- List of companies of the Republic of Artsakh
- List of First Secretaries of the Nagorno-Karabakh Autonomous Oblast Committee of the Communist Party of Azerbaijan
- List of forts in Artsakh
- List of newspapers in Nagorno-Karabakh
- List of political parties in Artsakh
- List of United Nations Security Council resolutions on the Nagorno-Karabakh conflict
- List of universities in Artsakh
- List of representative offices of Artsakh
- List of states with limited recognition
- List of twin towns and sister cities in the Republic of Artsakh

== See also ==
- Index of Armenia-related articles
- Lists of country-related topics - similar lists for other countries
- Outline of the Republic of Artsakh
