= Outline of the Republic of Artsakh =

Overview of and topical guide to the Republic of Artsakh

The Flag of Artsakh

The Coat of arms of Artsakh

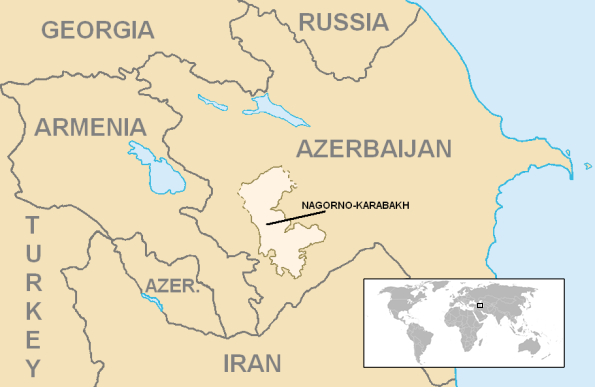
The location of Nagorno-Karabakh

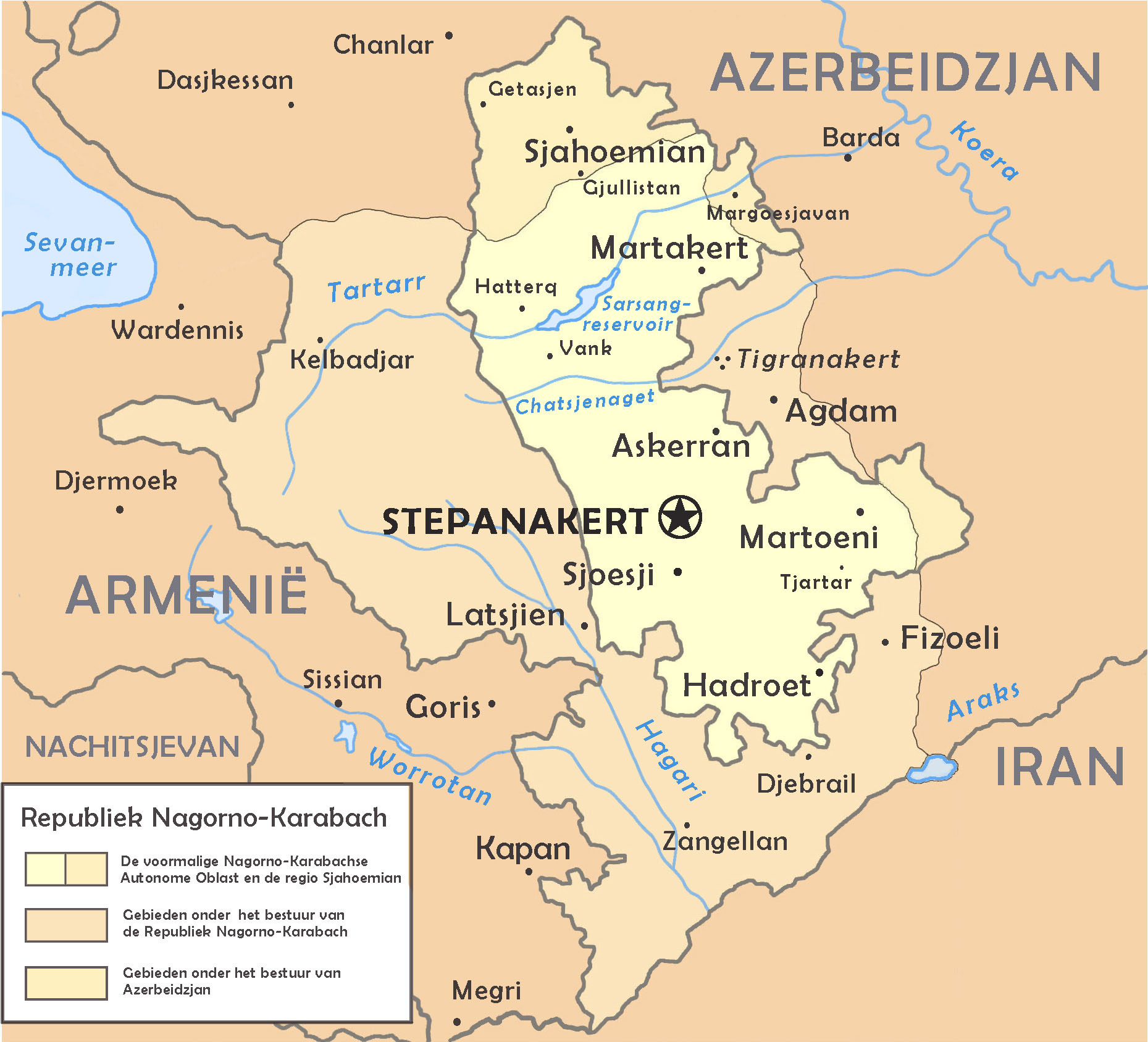
An enlargeable map of the Nagorno-Karabakh region showing areas currently occupied by Nagorno-Karabakh Republic and Azerbaijan

The following outline is provided as an overview and topical guide of the Republic of Artsakh and Nagorno-Karabakh region:

Nagorno-Karabakh is a region of the Republic of Azerbaijan in the South Caucasus region of Eurasia. It encompasses the former Republic of Artsakh, which was a de facto independent republic, and is de jure part of the Republic of Azerbaijan, about 270 kilometers (170 mi) west of the Azerbaijani capital of Baku and neighbouring Armenia.

== General reference ==
- Pronunciation:
- Common English country name: Nagorno-Karabakh
- Official English country names: The Republic of Artsakh or (formerly and still commonly used, the Nagorno-Karabakh Republic)
- Common endonym(s):
- Official endonym(s):
- Adjectival(s):
- Demonym(s):
- Etymology: Name of Nagorno-Karabakh
- ISO country codes: See the Outline of Azerbaijan
- ISO region codes: See the Outline of Azerbaijan
- Internet country code top-level domain: See the Outline of Azerbaijan

== Geography of Artsakh ==
An enlargeable topographic map of the Nagorno-Karabakh region

- The Republic of Artsakh was a de facto independent country, but it was internationally recognized as a part of the Republic of Azerbaijan
- Location:
  - Eurasia
    - Caucasus (between Europe and Asia)
      - South Caucasus
  - Time zone: Armenia Time, UTC+04:00
- Area of Artsakh: 4,400 km^{2}
- Atlas of Nagorno-Karabakh

=== Regions of Artsakh ===
Regions of Artsakh: 1: Martakert; 2: Askeran; 3: Stepanakert (city); 4: Martuni; 5: Shushi Claimed regions: 6: Hadrut; 7: Shahumyan (Areas shaded white indicate territory outside of the former Nagorno-Karabakh Autonomous Oblast and Shahumyan Region. Horizontal dashed lines indicate territory under the control of Azerbaijan.)

==== Administrative divisions of Artsakh ====
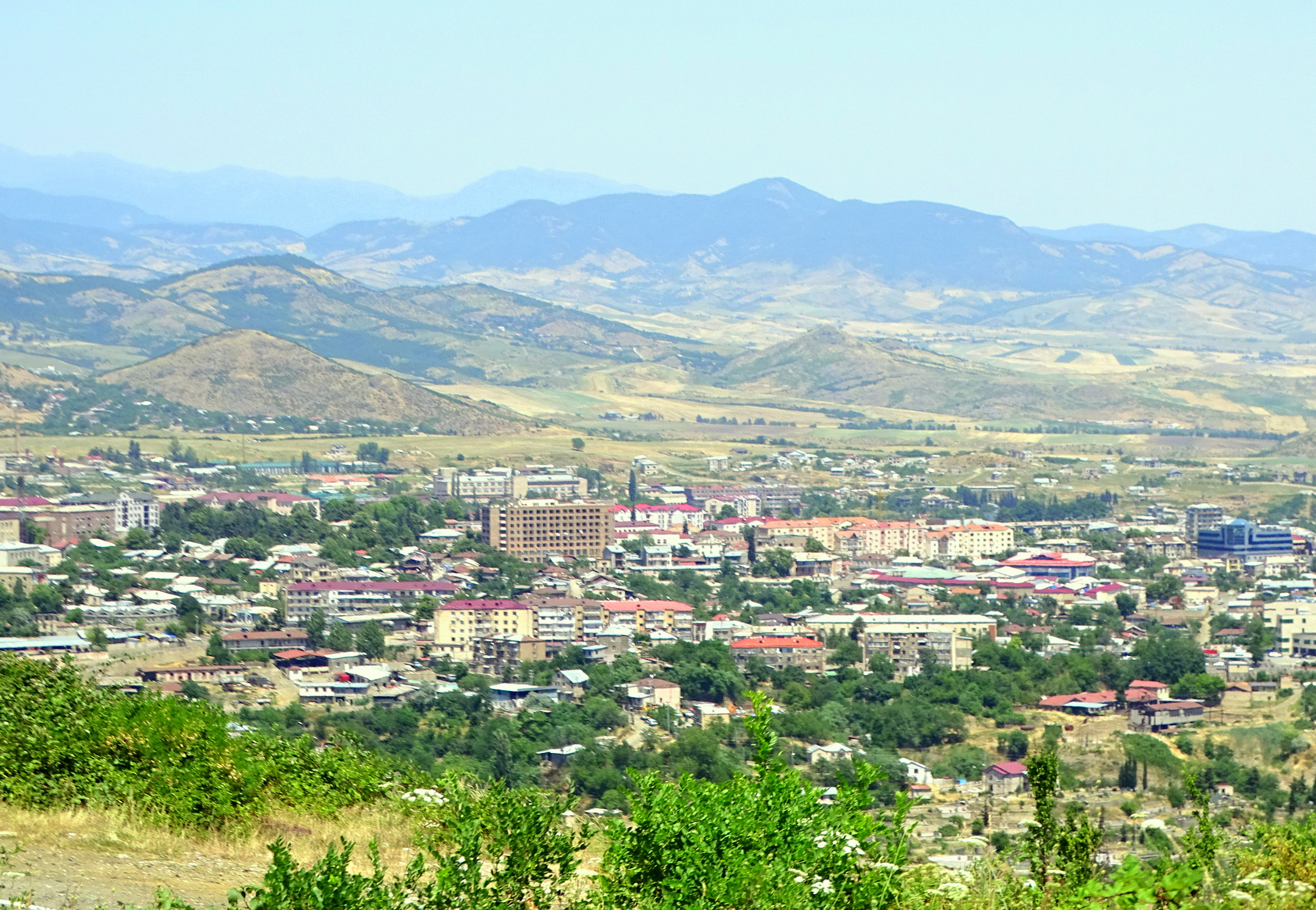
General view of the capital Stepanakert

- Capital of the Republic of Artsakh: Stepanakert
- List of cities and towns in Artsakh

== Government and politics of Artsakh ==
- Form of government: Unitary presidential republic
- Capital of Artsakh: Stepanakert
- Elections in Artsakh

=== Executive branch of the government of Artsakh ===
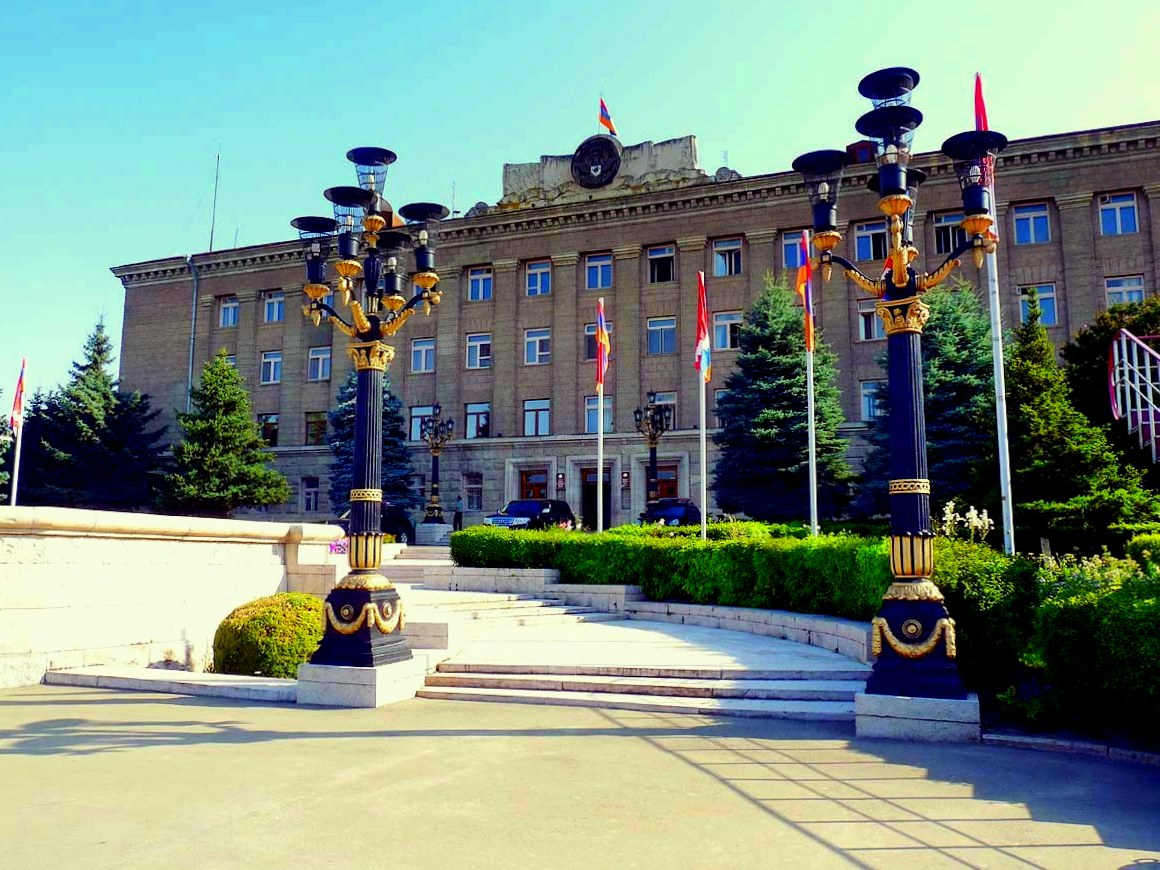
The Artsakh Presidential Palace

- Head of state and Head of government: President of Artsakh, Arayik Harutyunyan

=== Legislative branch of the government of Artsakh ===
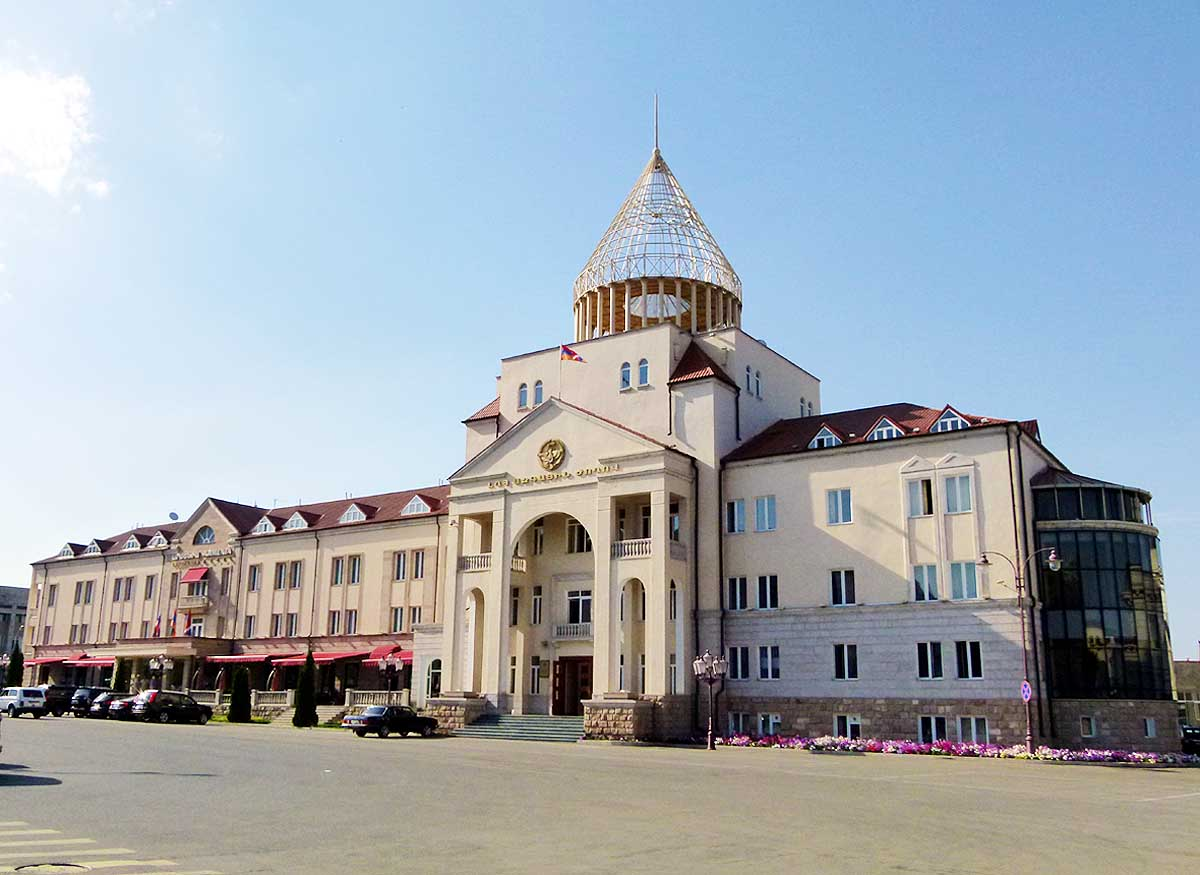
The National Assembly of Artsakh in Stepanakert

- National Assembly (unicameral)

=== Foreign relations of Artsakh ===
- Armenia-Artsakh relations
- List of representative offices of Artsakh
- Minister of Foreign Affairs
- Visa policy of Artsakh
- Visa requirements for Artsakh citizens
  - Artsakh passport

==== International organization membership ====
- Community for Democracy and Rights of Nations
- Confederation of Independent Football Associations

=== Law and order in Artsakh ===
- Constitution of Nagorno-Karabakh
- Freedom of religion in Nagorno-Karabakh

=== Military of Artsakh ===
- Command
  - Commander-in-chief:
    - Ministry of Defence of Nagorno-Karabakh
- Forces
  - Artsakh Defense Army
  - Air Force of Nagorno-Karabakh
  - Special forces of Nagorno-Karabakh
- Military history of the Republic of Artsakh
- Military ranks of Nagorno-Karabakh
- Land mine situation in Nagorno-Karabakh

== History of Artsakh ==
- Military history of Nagorno-Karabakh
- Timeline of Artsakh history

== Culture of Artsakh ==
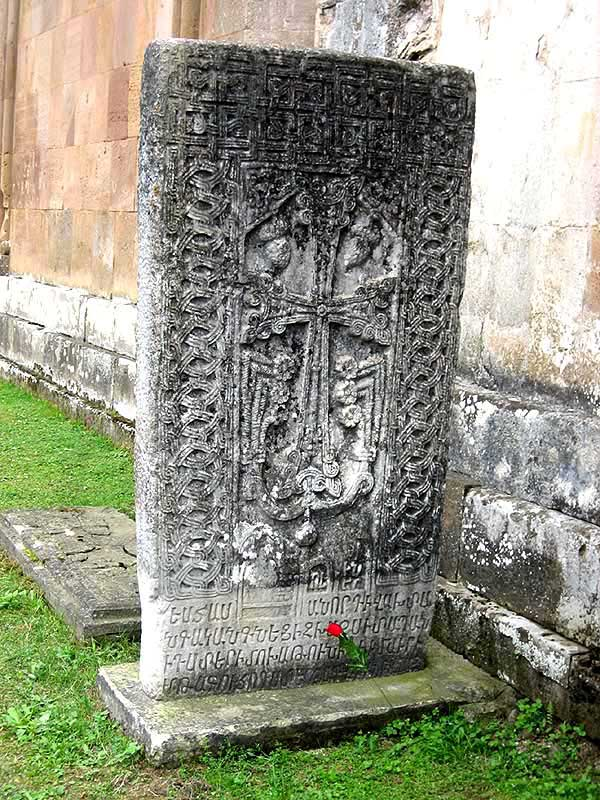
A large 13th century Armenian-inscribed khachkar outside of the Cathedral of St. John the Baptist, Gandzasar Monastery

- Architecture of Nagorno-Karabakh
- Cuisine of Nagorno-Karabakh
- Coat of arms of Nagorno-Karabakh
- Flag of Nagorno-Karabakh
- Religion in Artsakh
  - Armenian Apostolic Church

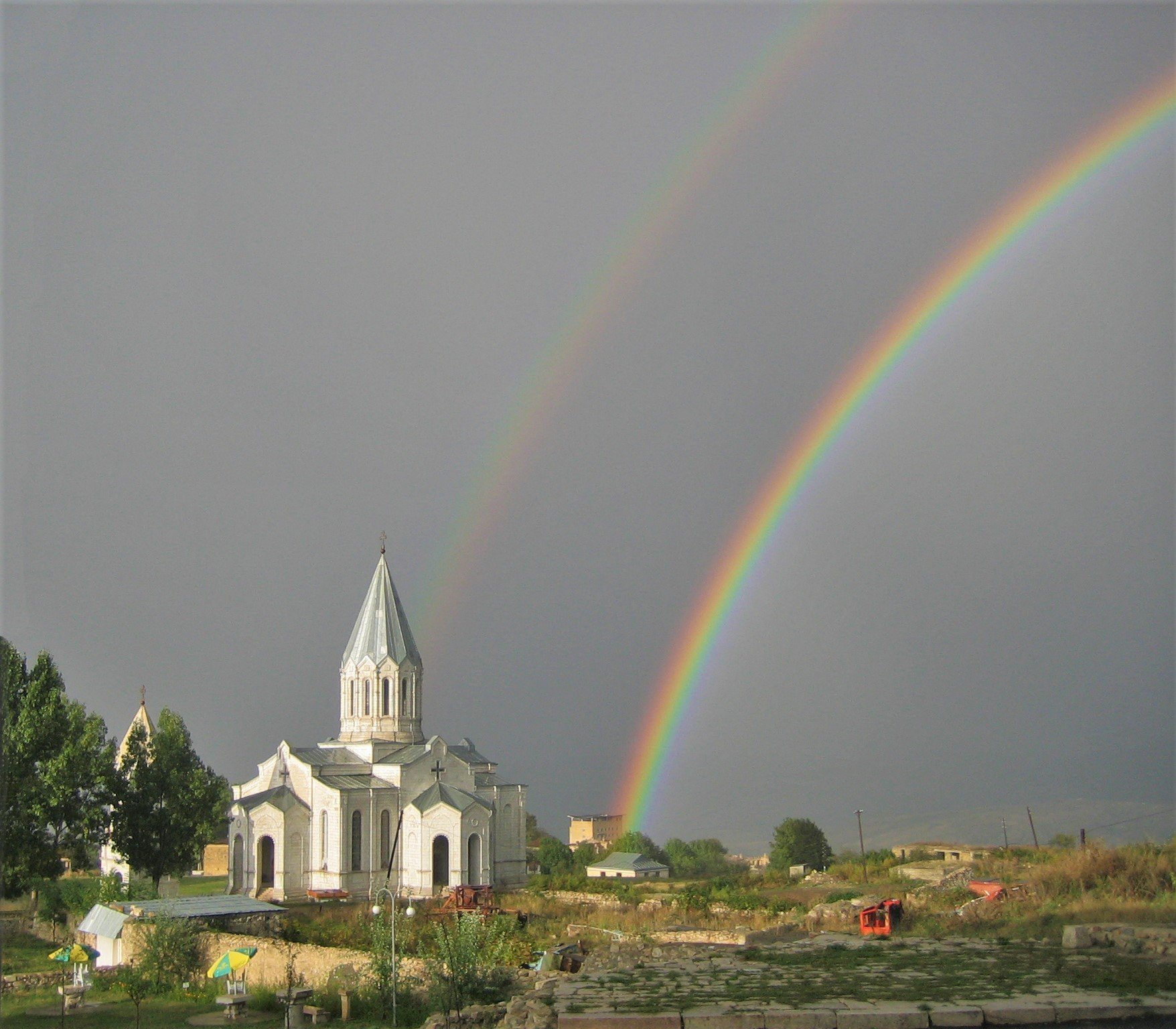
Ghazanchetsots Cathedral

== Economy and infrastructure of Artsakh ==
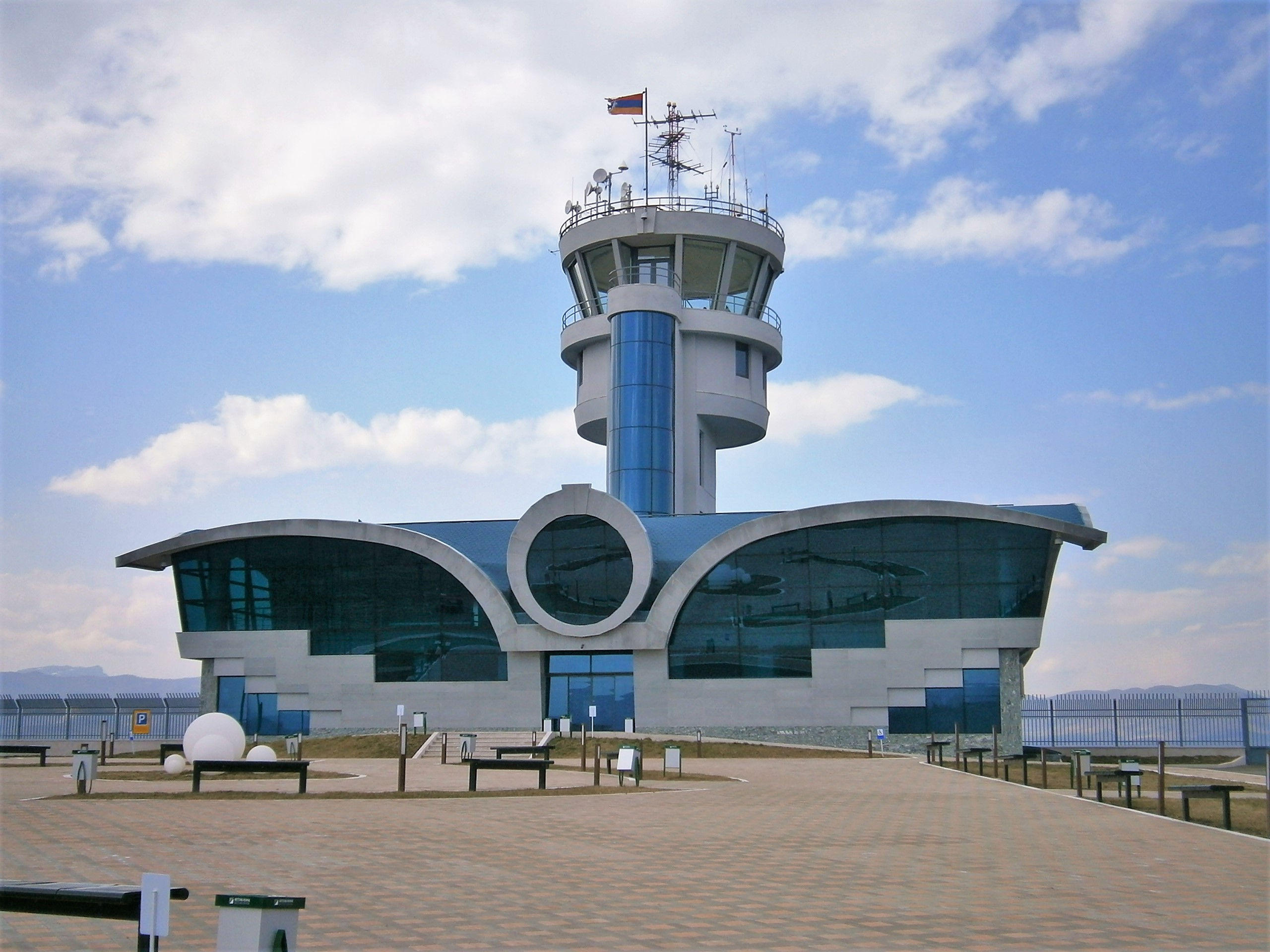
Stepanakert Airport

- Currency of Artsakh: Artsakh dram and Armenian dram
- Artsakhbank
- Tourism in the Republic of Artsakh

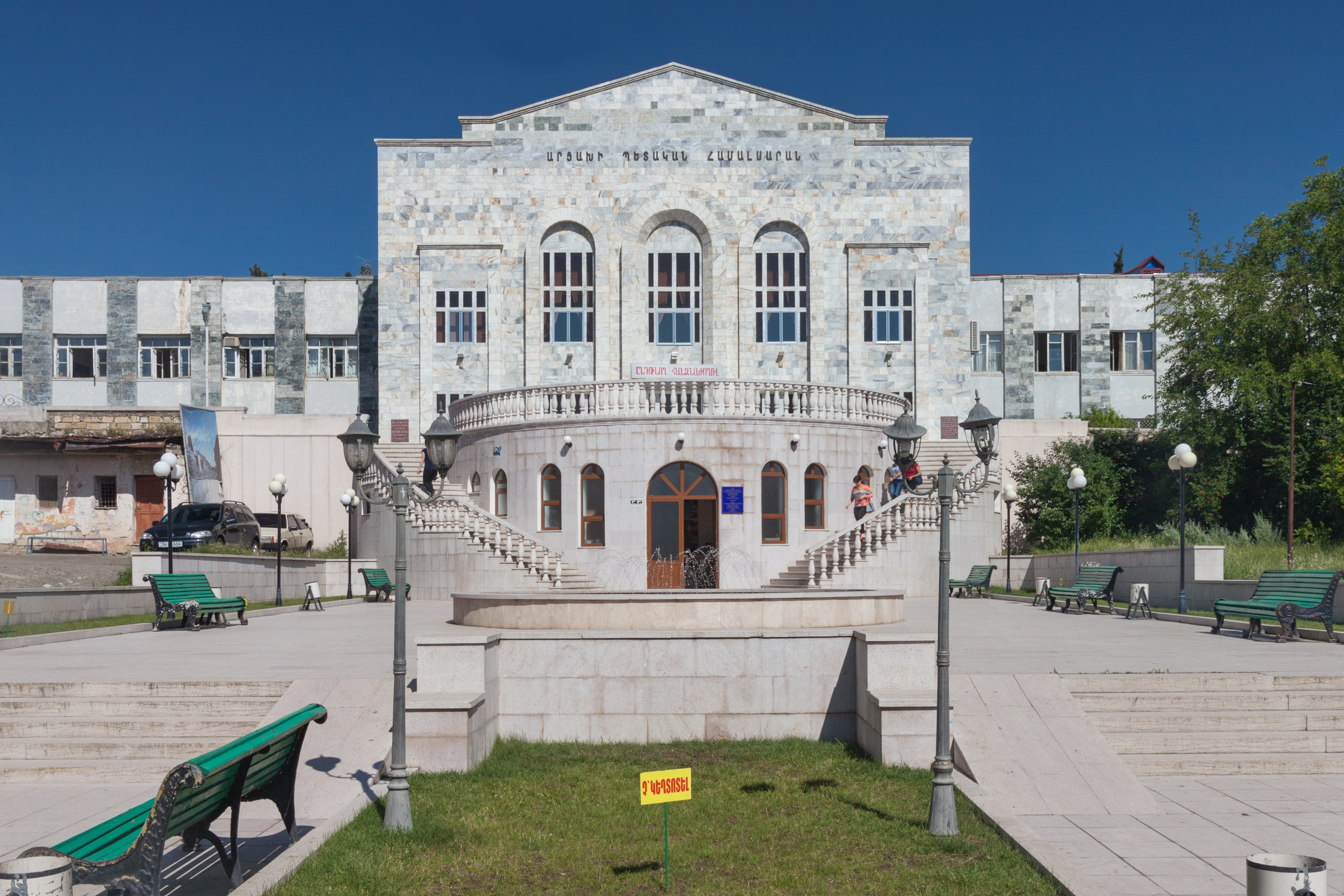
Artsakh State University

== See also ==
- Index of Artsakh-related articles
- List of international rankings
- List of Nagorno-Karabakh-related topics
- Outline of Armenia
- Outline of Europe
- Outline of Azerbaijan
- Outline of geography
