= Arzik Mkhitaryan =

Nagorno-Karabakh politician

Arzik Martiros Mkhitaryan
- Արզիկ Մարտիրոսի Մխիթարյան

Member of the National Assembly of Artsakh
- Incumbent
- Assumed office 3 May 2015

Personal details
- Born: 6 November 1946 (age 79) Kochoghot, NKAO, Azerbaijan SSR
- Party: Free Motherland
- Education: Yerevan State University; Armenian State Pedagogical University

Academic work
- Discipline: Pedagogy, philology
- Institutions: Artsakh State University

Arzik Martiros Mkhitaryan (Armenian: Արզիկ Մարտիրոսի Մխիթարյան) (born 6 November 1946) is a member of the National Assembly of Artsakh.

Mkhitaryan was born in the village of Kochoghot, Mardakert Region, Nagorno-Karabakh Autonomous Oblast, Azerbaijan SSR. She graduated from the local secondary school in 1963, the year in which she matriculated at Yerevan State University. She graduated in 1968 with a degree in philology and began working as a teacher of Armenian language and literature at the village school of Drmbon. She transferred to a school in Stepanakert the next year, the same year in which she began work as a lecturer at the Stepanakert Institute. She was elected head of the institute's trade union in 1982. In 1986 she defended her thesis at the Yerevan State Pedagogical University, at which institution she had begun postgraduate studies in 1976. In 1987 she was elected first secretary of the Communist Party organization at the institute. In 1989 she became Dean of the Faculty of Pedagogy and Biology, and in 1996 she was elected Dean of the Faculty of Humanities; in the intervening years the Institute had become Artsakh State University. She became Dean of Pedagogy once more in 2010, remaining in the post until 2015. She was named professor in 2000. In 2007 she was named an Honored Scientist of the Nagorno-Karabakh Republic, a title she received again in 2015, this time as Honored Scientist of Artsakh; she has also received the Order of Mesrop Mashtots and the Vachagan Barepasht Medal for her work.

Mkhitaryan first became active in the Artsakh National Liberation Movement in 1988. A member of the Free Motherland party, she was elected to the National Assembly at the election of May 3, 2015, being named to chair the Standing Committee on Foreign Relations later that month. In this capacity she has met with numerous foreign dignitaries, including David Valadao, co-chairman of the Congressional Caucus of Armenian Issues of the United States House of Representatives; Tony Clement and Rachael Harder, members of the House of Commons of Canada; and Caroline Cox, Baroness Cox. As of 2017 she retains her chairmanship in the Assembly.

Mkhitaryan has written two textbooks and over forty scholarly articles during her career. With her husband she has three sons.
