= Armenakan Party (Nagorno-Karabakh) =

Armenakan Party (Nagorno-Karabakh) Արմենական կուսակցություն
- Leader: Boris Arushanyan
- Secretary: Ara Poghosyan
- Founded: April 1999
- Headquarters: Stepanakert
- Ideology: Armenian nationalism United Armenia (Armenia-Artsakh unification)
- Political position: Center-right
- Slogan: "Union for Salvation"

Website
- http://armenakan.info/en/

The Armenakan Party (Armenian: «Արմենական կուսակցություն» — Armenakan Kusaktsutyun), also known as the Armenakan Party of Artsakh, is a center-right political party in Artsakh.

== History ==
The party participated in the 2000 Nagorno-Karabakh parliamentary election, winning 1 seat in the National Assembly.

The Armenakan Party failed to receive any seats following the 2005 Nagorno-Karabakh parliamentary election, obtaining just 0.86% of the popular vote.

The party has not participated in any recent elections, however, the party endorsed Arayik Harutyunyan and the Free Motherland party prior to the 2020 Artsakhian general election.

== Ideology ==
The party supports the continued development of the state, the establishment of a strong democracy, culture and public solidarity, and political tolerance in Artsakh. In addition, the party supports development of the military, ensuring security, cooperating with regional partners, promoting peace in the Caucasus region, and guaranteeing human rights for its citizens.

== See also ==
- Elections in Artsakh
- List of political parties in Artsakh
