= 1991 Armenian independence referendum =

- 21 September 1991
- Do you agree that the Republic of Armenia should be an independent democratic state outside of the USSR?

Results
Choice	Votes	%
Yes	2,042,627	99.51%
No	10,002	0.49%
Valid votes	2,052,629	99.80%
Invalid or blank votes	4,129	0.20%
Total votes	2,056,758	100.00%
Registered voters/turnout	2,163,967	95.05%

An independence referendum was held in the Armenia SSR on 21 September 1991 to determine whether Armenia should secede from the Soviet Union. It followed a declaration of independence on 23 August 1990. 99.5% of voters voted in favour, with a turnout of 95%. The country officially became an independent state on 23 September 1991.

== Background ==
The May 1990 Armenian Supreme Soviet election resulted in the formation of a non-Communist government led by Levon Ter-Petrosyan, chairman of the Pan-Armenian National Movement.

On 23 August 1990, the Supreme Soviet of the Armenian SSR adopted the Declaration of State Sovereignty of Armenia, which marked the beginning of the process of establishing independent statehood. It was declared that the Republic of Armenia was a sovereign state endowed with independence. The Constitution of the USSR and the laws of the USSR ceased to apply in the territory of the Republic. In order to ensure its security and inviolability of its borders, the Republic of Armenia established its own Armed Forces, internal troops, state and public security bodies subordinate to the Supreme Soviet.

In December 1990, Mikhail Gorbachev proposed a referendum on the continuation of the Soviet Union, as a federative state. The Ter-Petrosyan government rejected the proposal on 1 March 1991 and decided instead to hold a referendum on independence.

The referendum was scheduled for 21 September 1991. The Presidium of the Supreme Soviet of the Republic was given the right "in case of a sharp change in the situation to decide on an early referendum".

The referendum was administered by the Central Referendum Commission, which was established on 23 May 1991. The commission consisted of a chairperson (Babken Gurgeni Ararktsyan), two deputy chairpersons (Gevorg Hrachiki Vardanyan and Ter-Husik Beniki Lazaryan), a secretary (Lyudvig Varazdati Khachatryan) and additional members appointed by state authorities.

== Results ==
Choice	Votes	%
For	2,042,627	99.51
Against	10,002	0.49
Total	2,052,629	100.00
Valid votes	2,052,629	99.80
Invalid/blank votes	4,129	0.20
Total votes	2,056,758	100.00
Registered voters/turnout	2,163,967	95.05
Source: Direct Democracy

== Aftermath ==
On 23 September 1991, the Supreme Council of Armenia confirmed the republic's secession from the USSR based on the results of the referendum.

Soviet president Mikhail Gorbachev unsuccessfully attempted to persuade Armenia to join the Union of Soviet Sovereign Republics. However, the Armenian government signed an economic treaty with Russia that created a free-trade zone.

Levon Ter-Petrosyan was elected the first president of Armenia in November 1991 and Armenia formally gained independence on 26 December 1991.

=== Nagorno-Karabakh ===
In a separate referendum, around 99% of ethnic Armenians in the Nagorno-Karabakh region voted for independence from Azerbaijan. Artur Mkrtchyan was chosen as president of the region following the 28 December 1991 parliamentary elections. On 2 January 1992 President Mutalibov of Azerbaijan placed the region under direct presidential rule, and the region formally declared its independence from the nation four days later on 6 January.

Prior to the 1991 referendum, the conflict had started in the Nagorno-Karabakh region in 1988, with the referendum soon causing an escalation into a long phase of war within the Nagorno-Karabakh conflict.

== See also ==
- Independence Day (Armenia)

== Bibliography ==
- Nohlen, Dieter; Hartmann, Christof; Grotz, Florian (2001). "Armenia". Elections in Asia and the Pacific: A Data Handbook: Volume I: Middle East, Central Asia, and South Asia. Oxford University Press. doi:10.1093/019924958X.003.0016. ISBN 978-0-19-924958-9.
- Commission on Security and Cooperation in Europe (1991). Report on the Armenian Referendum on Independence (PDF). Archived from the original (PDF) on 2022-08-29.
