= Avanesyan =

Avanesyan (Armenian: Ավանեսյան) is an Armenian surname. Notable people with the surname include:

- Arpat Avanesyan, physicist and legislator.
- David Avanesyan (born 1988), Russian boxer.
- Elina Avanesyan (born 2002), Russian-born Armenian tennis player.
- Mher Avanesyan (born 1974), Armenian professional footballer.
- Mher Avanesyan (born 1981), Armenian double-arm amputee alpine skier and competitive sailor
- Monica Avanesyan (born 1998), Armenian singer.
