= Georgi Petrosian =

Armenian politician

- Գեորգի Պետրոսյան
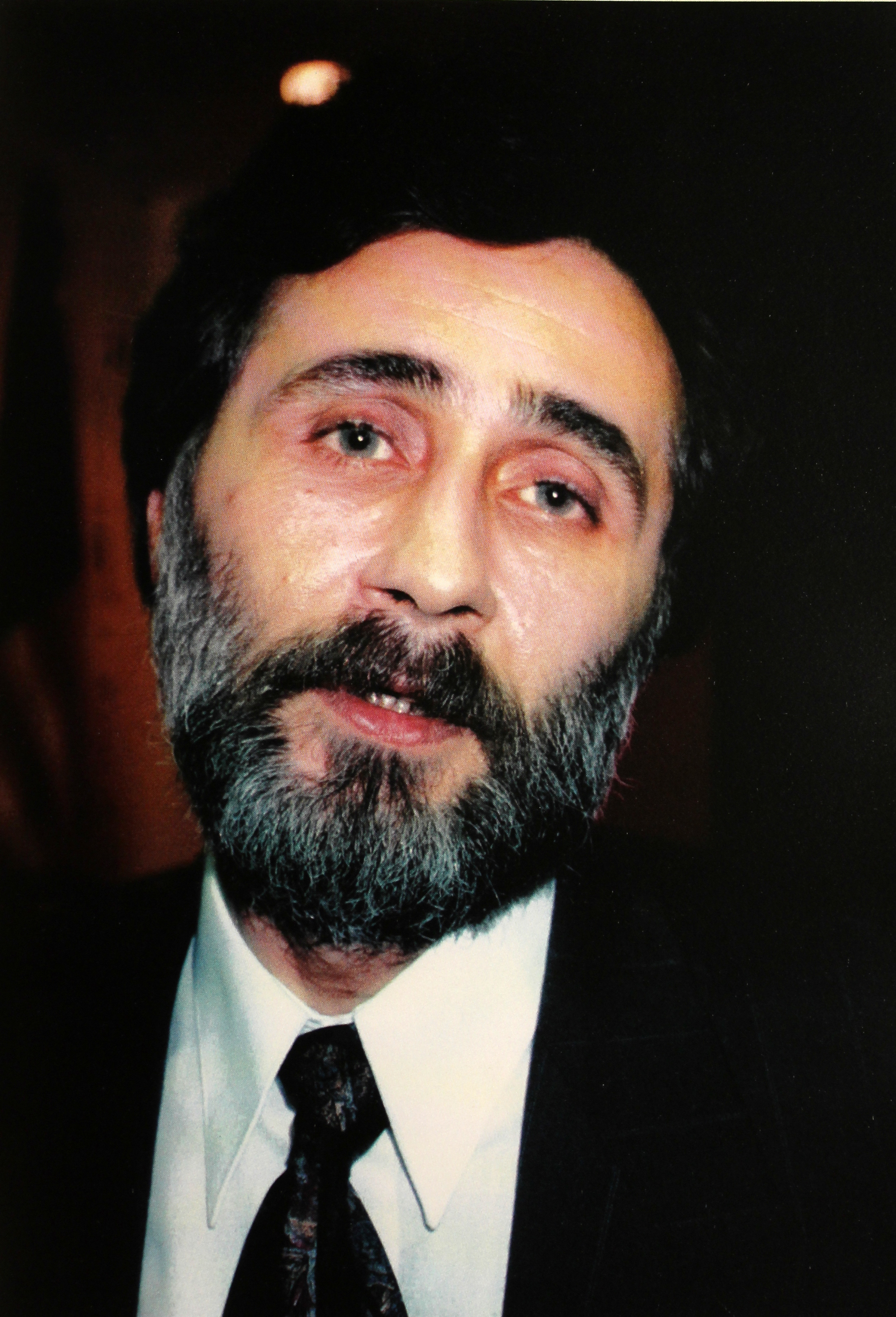

Foreign Minister of the Nagorno-Karabakh Republic
- In office 2007–2011
- President: Bako Sahakyan
- Preceded by: Arman Melikyan
- Succeeded by: Vasily Atajanyan (acting); Karen Mirzoyan

Acting Chairman of the Supreme Council of the Nagorno-Karabakh Republic
- In office 15 April 1992 – 14 June 1993
- Prime Minister: Robert Kocharyan
- Preceded by: Artur Mkrtchian
- Succeeded by: Karen Baburian

Personal details
- Born: 10 January 1953 (age 73) Stepanakert, Nagorno-Karabakh, Azerbaijan SSR, Soviet Union
- Party: Armenian Revolutionary Federation

Georgi Mikayeli Petrosian (Armenian: Գեորգի Միքայելի Պետրոսյան) (born 10 January 1953) is an Armenian politician who previously worked in the Republic of Artsakh. He is a member of the Armenian Revolutionary Federation (ARF).

From 1988 to 1990 Petrosyan was a participant in the Karabakh movement to unite Nagorno-Karabakh with Armenia. After the ARF won the 1991 Nagorno-Karabakh parliamentary election, Petrosian was elected vice president of the Supreme Council of the Nagorno-Karabakh Republic from January to April 1992, and took over as acting president upon the death of Artur Mkrtchian in April 1992. In June 1993, Petrosian resigned as acting president due to his opposition to a peace plan between Armenia and Azerbaijan (which was not implemented). He was replaced by Karen Baburian. His resignation was partly responsible for the weakened influence of the ARF as a political party in Artsakh.

Petrosyan also served as Foreign Minister of the Republic of Nagorno-Karabakh Republic from 2007 to 2011.
