= Mkhitaryan =

Mkhitaryan, Mkhitarian, Miktarian or Mekhitarian (Armenian: Մխիթարյան, Western Armenian Մխիթարեան) is an Armenian surname. See Մխիթարյան for the origin.

== Notable people ==
Notable people with the surname include:

=== Artists ===
- Anahit Mekhitarian (born 1969), Armenian operatic soprano
- Gor Mkhitarian (born 1973), Armenian singer and songwriter

=== Politicians ===
- Arzik Mkhitaryan (born 1946), member of the National Assembly of Artsakh

=== Sportspeople ===
- Ashot Mkhitaryan (1959–2010), Armenian head of the National weightlifting team of Armenia
- Hamlet Mkhitaryan, multiple people
- Henrikh Mkhitaryan (born 1989), Armenian footballer who plays as a midfielder
- Krikor Mekhitarian (born 1986), Brazilian chess master of Armenian descent
- Oganez Mkhitaryan (born 1962), Armenian football coach and former player
- Vahan Mkhitaryan (born 1996), Armenian swimmer

== See also ==
- Mechitarists (Armenian: Մխիթարեաններ), also spelled Mekhitarists, or Mekhitarian Fathers (Armenian: Մխիթարեան հայրեր), headquartered in Venice and Vienna, congregation of Benedictine monks of the Armenian Catholic Church founded in 1717 by Abbot Mekhitar of Sebaste.
