= Khindristan =

Khindristan or Khndzristan may refer to:

- Khndzristan, Nagorno-Karabakh, Khojaly District, Azerbaijan; and Askeran Province, Republic of Artsakh
- Xındırıstan, Aghdam District, Azerbaijan
