= Ashot Ghulian =

Politician in the Republic of Artsakh

- Աշոտ Ղուլյան
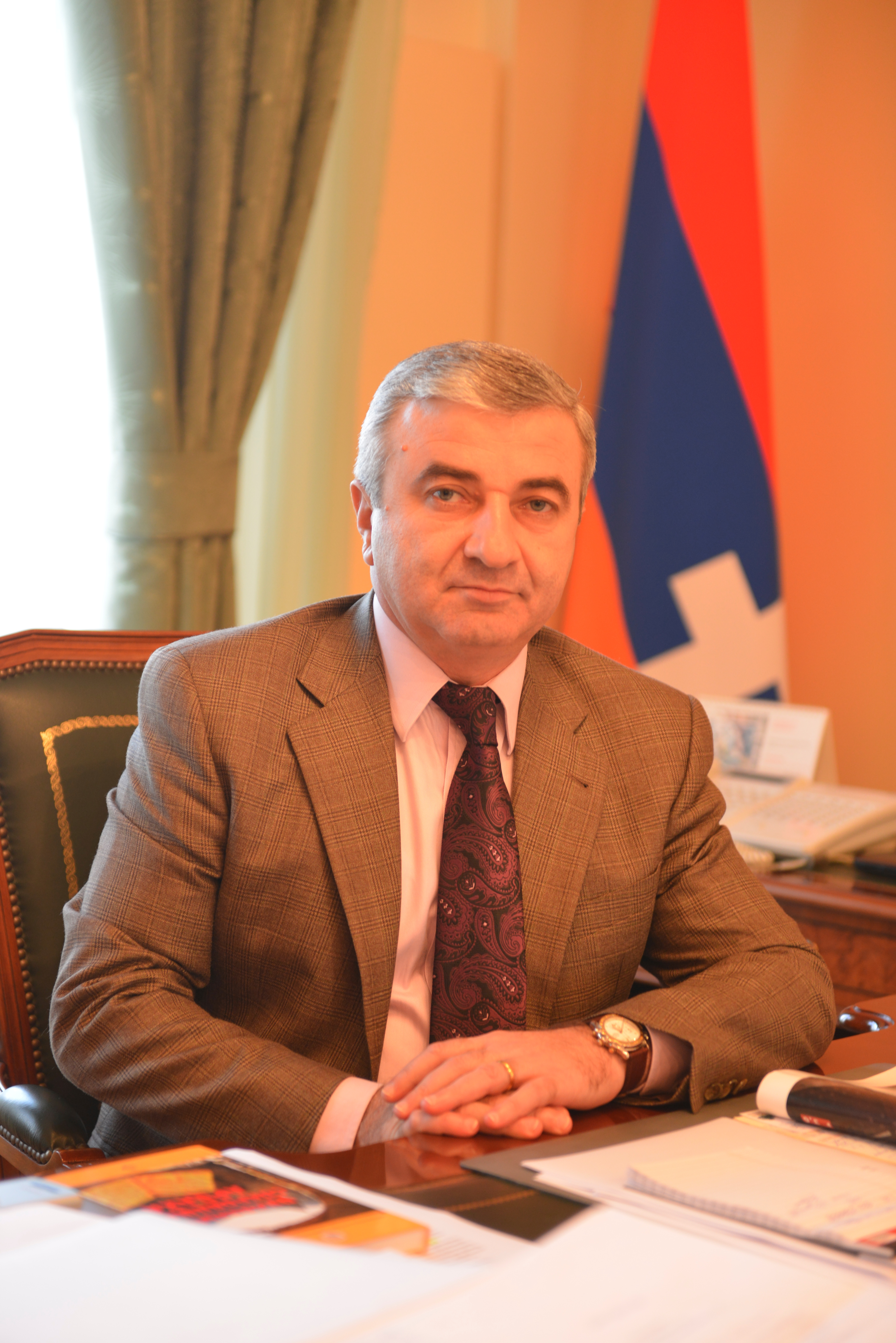

President of the National Assembly of Artsakh
- In office 1 July 2005 – 21 May 2020
- Prime Minister: Anushavan Danielyan; Arayik Harutyunyan
- Preceded by: Oleg Yesayan
- Succeeded by: Arthur Tovmasyan

Minister of Foreign Affairs of Nagorno-Karabakh
- In office October 2002 – 2004

Minister of Education, Culture and Sports of Nagorno-Karabakh
- In office 2004–2005

Personal details
- Born: 19 August 1965 (age 61) Khndzristan, Nagorno-Karabakh, Azerbaijan SSR, Soviet Union
- Party: Democratic Party of Artsakh
- Education: Stepanakert Pedagogical Institute

Ashot Vladimiri Ghulian (Armenian: Աշոտ Վլադիմիրի Ղուլյան; born 19 August 1965) was the President of the National Assembly of the Republic of Artsakh between 2005 and 2020.

== Early life ==
He was born on 19 August 1965 in the Khndzristan village, Askeran Region of Nagorno-Karabakh, Azerbaijan SSR. In 1983, Ghulian attended the Stepanakert Pedagogical Institute for Historical Studies. From 1984 to 1986, he served in the Soviet Army. Ghulian graduated from the faculty of the Department of Vanadzor Pedagogical Institute in Stepanakert in 1990. He taught at the Khndzristan high school and participated in village self-defense forces from 1991 to 1992 during the First Nagorno-Karabakh War.

== Career ==
On 1 December 1992, Ghulian joined the convocation of the Supreme Council for Foreign Relations Committee, becoming a senior adviser in 1993. In September, he became the Assistant of the Supreme Council to the President. He led the bilateral relations section of the Nagorno-Karabakh Foreign Ministry beginning in January 1995, and the political administration beginning in January 1998. Ghulian was appointed Deputy Minister of Foreign Affairs on 15 December 1998. He left the Ministry of Foreign Affairs in June 2001, and the Democratic Party of Artsakh elected him chair of the social and political organization. In October 2002, he was appointed Minister of Foreign Affairs, and in 2004 he was appointed Minister of Education, Culture and Sports. Ghulian was elected president of the Central Council of the Democratic Party of Artsakh in January 2005. On 19 June 2005, he was elected to the 4th session of the National Assembly of Nagorno-Karabakh, as representation of the Artsakh Democratic Party for the 2005 Nagorno-Karabakh parliamentary election. At the first plenary session of the National Assembly on 30 June 2005, Ghulian was elected speaker of the parliament. The Artsakh Democratic Party represented by him came in second at the 2010 Nagorno-Karabakh parliamentary election, behind the Free Motherland party.

Ghulian has made several visits to the United States to lobby for support.

== Personal life ==
Ghulian is married. He has been awarded the Order of St. Gregory the Illuminator.
