= Hamlet Mkhitaryan =

Hamlet Mkhitaryan may refer to:

- Hamlet Mkhitaryan (footballer, born 1962) or Hamlet Apetnakovich Mkhitaryan (1962–1996), deceased Soviet/Armenian footballer who played as a striker. Father of footballer Henrikh Mkhitaryan
- Hamlet Mkhitaryan (footballer, born 1973), or Hamlet Vladimirovich Mkhitaryan, Armenian footballer who plays as a midfielder

== See also ==
- Mkhitaryan
