= 1996 Nagorno-Karabakh presidential election =

24 November 1996	1997 →
- Turnout: 78.07%
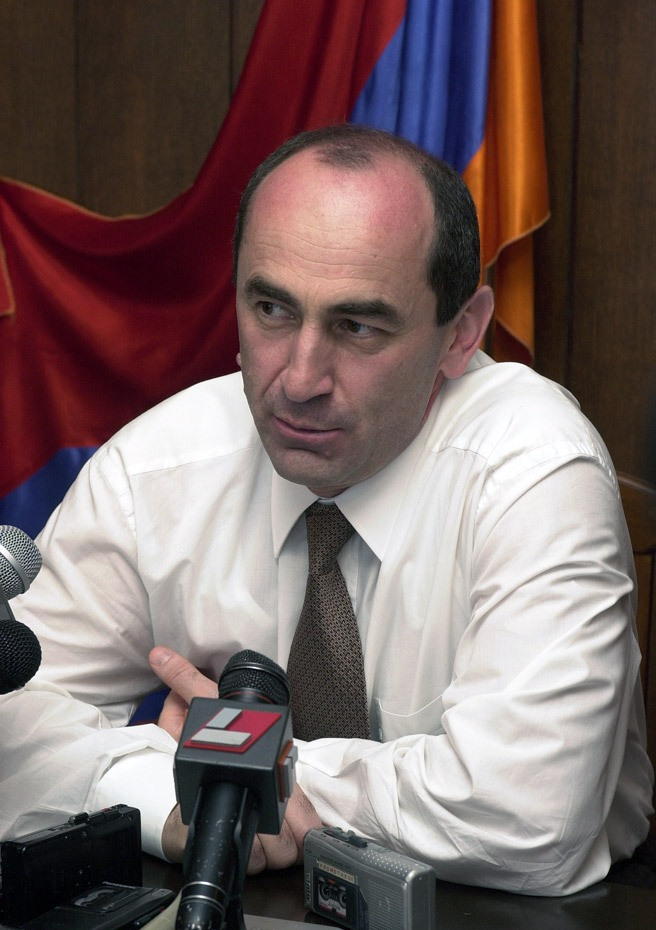

Candidate	Robert Kocharyan	Boris Arushanyan
Party	Independent	Independent
Popular vote	60,241	4,801
Percentage	88.91%	7.09%
President-elect
Robert Kocharyan
Independent

Presidential elections were held in the Nagorno-Karabakh Republic on 24 November 1996. The result was a victory for independent candidate Robert Kocharyan, who received 89% of the vote.

== Results ==
Candidate	Party	Votes	%
Robert Kocharyan	Independent	60,241	88.91
Boris Arushanyan	Independent	4,801	7.09
Hrant Melkumyan	Communist Party	2,713	4.00
Total		67,755	100.00
Valid votes		67,755	96.72
Invalid/blank votes		2,297	3.28
Total votes		70,052	100.00
Registered voters/turnout		89,733	78.07
Source: CEC
