= 2015 Nagorno-Karabakh parliamentary election =

← 2010	3 May 2015	2020 →
- All 33 seats in the National Assembly; 17 seats needed for a majority
Party	Leader	Vote %	Seats	+/–
Free Motherland	Arayik Harutyunyan	47.35	15	+1
Democratic Party	Ashot Ghulian	19.02	6	0
ARF	Artur Aghabekyan	18.81	7	+1
Movement 88	Vitaly Balasanyan	6.93	2	New
National Revival	Hayk Khanumyan	5.38	1	New
Independents	–	–	2	−5
This lists parties that won seats. See the complete results below.
Prime Minister before	Elected Prime Minister
Arayik Harutyunyan; Free Motherland	Arayik Harutyunyan; Free Motherland

Parliamentary elections were held in the Nagorno-Karabakh Republic on 3 May 2015.

== Background ==
Nagorno-Karabakh declared its independence from Azerbaijan in 1991. The First Nagorno-Karabakh War took place between 1988 and 1994 which resulted in Nagorno-Karabakh, with Armenian support, becoming de facto independent from Azerbaijan. However it has not been internationally recognised and Azerbaijan still claims the area as part of its state.

== Electoral system ==
The 33 seats in the National Assembly consisted of 22 seats elected by proportional representation and 11 seats elected by first-past-the-post voting.

== Conduct ==
More than 100 representatives from 30 countries observed the elections.

== Results ==
Party	Proportional			Constituency			Total seats	+/–
Party	Votes	%	Seats	Votes	%	Seats	Total seats	+/–
Free Motherland	32,632	47.35	11			4	15	+1
Democratic Party of Artsakh	13,105	19.02	4			2	6	0
Armenian Revolutionary Federation	12,965	18.81	4			3	7	+1
Movement 88	4,778	6.93	2			0	2	New
National Revival	3,709	5.38	1			0	1	New
Communist Party of Artsakh	1,136	1.65	0			0	0	0
Peace and Development	591	0.86	0			0	0	0
Independents						2	2	–5
Total	68,916	100.00	22			11	33	0
Valid votes	68,916	95.32		65,599	93.94			
Invalid/blank votes	3,380	4.68		4,232	6.06			
Total votes	72,296	100.00		69,831	100.00			
Registered voters/turnout	102,042	70.85		98,920	70.59			
Source: CEC, CEC, Caucasian Knot

== Reactions ==
Azerbaijan, the European Union, the United States and Turkey all said that they did not recognise the elections.
