= Artur Mkrtchyan =

Nagarno-Karabakh politician (1959–1992)

- Արթուր Մկրտչյան
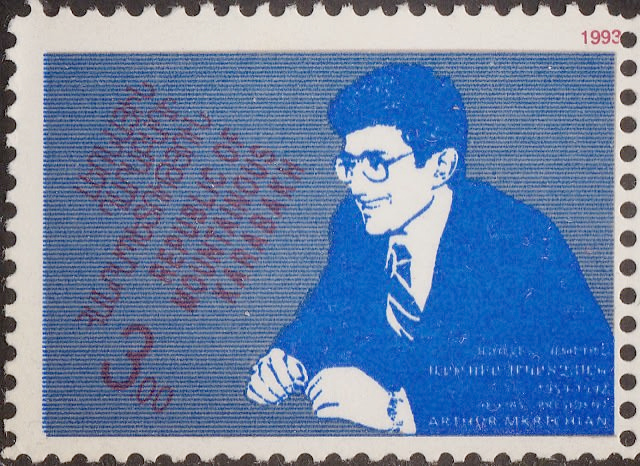
- Mkrtchyan on a 1993 stamp of Nagorno-Karabakh

Chairman of the Supreme Council of the Nagorno-Karabakh Republic
- In office 8 January 1992 – 14 April 1992
- Prime Minister: Oleg Yesayan
- Preceded by: Office established
- Succeeded by: Georgi Petrosian (acting)

Personal details
- Born: 16 February 1959 Ukhtadzor, Nagorno-Karabakh Autonomous Oblast, Azerbaijan SSR, Soviet Union
- Died: 14 April 1992 (aged 33) Stepanakert, Azerbaijan (Note: Then-claimed by Artsakh, which was only recognised by Abkhazia, South Ossetia and Transnistria)
- Party: ARF
- Education: Yerevan State University

Artur Aslani Mkrtchyan (Armenian: Արթուր Ասլանի Մկրտչյան; 16 February 1959 – 14 April 1992) was the first Chairman of the Supreme Council of the Nagorno-Karabakh Republic, who was elected on 7 January 1992. He made an important contribution to reinforcing the defensive capabilities of the Nagorno-Karabakh Republic, but was fatally shot under unclear circumstances in April 1992.

== Biography ==
Artur Mkrtchyan was born in 1959 in the village of Ukhtadzor in the Hadrut District of the Nagorno-Karabakh Autonomous Oblast. After graduating from the village secondary school in 1976, he entered the faculty of history at Yerevan State University. After graduating from university, he conducted his post-graduate studies at the Institute of Anthropology and Ethnography in Moscow. From 1981 to 1983 he worked at the Armenia Ethnography Museum. In 1986 he returned to his hometown to work as the director of the Hadrut Historical-Geological Museum. In 1988 he defended his PhD thesis and received the degree of Candidate of Historical Sciences.

Mkrtchyan was an active participant in the Karabakh movement from its early days. He joined the Armenian Revolutionary Federation (ARF) and after that party's victory in the 1991 Nagorno-Karabakh parliamentary election, he was elected the first Chairman of the Supreme Council of the Nagorno-Karabakh Republic on 7 January 1992.

Mkrtchyan was killed in his apartment in Stepanakert under mysterious circumstances on 14 April 1992. While an initial report by the NKR's interior minister, Armen Isagulov, stated that Mkrtchyan had been killed by unknown "gunmen," a later official report described his death as accidental. In 2019, former commander of the NKR's army, Samvel Babayan, claimed that Mkrtchyan's death was a suicide․ No one has ever been prosecuted in connection with his death. He was succeeded by Georgy Petrosyan as acting chairman of the Supreme Council.

Mkrtchyan had two children. In 2020, Mkrtchyan was posthumously awarded the title of Hero of Artsakh.
