= 2005 Nagorno-Karabakh parliamentary election =

- 19 June 2005
- 33 seats in the National Assembly; 17 seats needed for a majority
Party	Leader	Vote %	Seats	+/–
Free Motherland	Arayik Harutyunyan	18.48	10	New
Democratic Party	Ashot Ghulian	16.62	10	−10
ARF–M88		17.36	3	−6
Independents		45.63	10	+8
This lists parties that won seats. See the complete results below.
President of the National Assembly before	President of the National Assembly after
Oleg Yesayan; Independent	Ashot Ghulian; Democratic Party

Parliamentary elections were held in the Nagorno-Karabakh Republic on 19 June 2005. The election saw the two pro-government parties, the Democratic Party of Artsakh and Free Motherland, win a large majority of seats. The opposition criticised the conduct of the election but international election monitors generally praised the election.

== Background ==
Nagorno-Karabakh declared its independence from Azerbaijan in 1991. The First Nagorno-Karabakh War took place between 1988 and 1994 which resulted in Nagorno-Karabakh, with Armenian support, becoming de facto independent from Azerbaijan. However it has not been internationally recognised and Azerbaijan still claims the area as part of its state. The President of Nagorno-Karabakh in 2005, Arkadi Ghukasyan, was elected in 1997 and re-elected in 2002 and had 2 years remaining on his presidential term.

2005 would be the fourth parliamentary election in Nagorno-Karabakh and was the first under a new electoral law which, among other things, introduced transparent ballot boxes. The Armenian Revolutionary Federation had been in co-operation with the government until the party's only member of the government, Armen Sargsian, was sacked as Education minister in December 2004. The party then went into opposition. The opposition was expected to do well in the upcoming parliamentary elections after the leader of the opposition Movement 88 party, Eduard Aghabekian, was elected mayor of Stepanakert in August 2004 defeating a government backed candidate.

== Electoral system ==
The 33 seats in the National Assembly consisted of 22 seats elected in single-member constituencies by first-past-the-post voting and 11 seats elected by proportional representation. The election threshold are 10% for political parties and 15% for electoral blocs. There was a requirement for turnout to exceed 25% in order for the election to be valid and the elected members would serve a five-year term.

== Campaign ==
185 candidates from 7 parties, together with some independents, contested the elections.

The election was not recognised internationally and so the Organization for Security and Co-operation in Europe (OSCE) did not send any election monitors. However about a hundred non-governmental observers did come to monitor the election, along with a group of deputies from the Russian State Duma. The election was regarded as illegitimate by Azerbaijan and their ally Turkey. Azerbaijan said that the election was illegal until Azerbaijanis were allowed to return and that it would undermine their OSCE talks with Armenia over the area. President Ghukasyan, though, said that the election would boost the international recognition of Nagorno-Karabakh and promised that the election would be honest and transparent.

The opposition competed in the election as a coalition between the Armenian Revolutionary Federation, the oldest nationalist party in Nagorno-Karabakh, and the new Movement 88 party. The opposition criticised the democratic record of the government and accused them of using their authority to intimidate and bribe voters, a charge which the government denied. Although the opposition was expected to do well, analysts said that disunity and the voters tiredness of continuous criticism could mean they would not do as well as expected.

As well as the existing government party of the president, the Democratic Party of Artsakh, a new pro-government party contested the election, Free Motherland. Free Motherland had a mainly economic focus and said that the opposition just criticised without offering solutions. Free Motherland was expected to mainly side with the government and having a second pro-government party was seen as benefiting the authorities.

== Results ==
The results saw a huge majority for the pro-government parties with the Democratic Party and Free Motherland both winning 10 seats. Most of the 10 independents were expected to back the government, while the opposition only won 3 seats, down from the 9 seats the Armenian Revolutionary Federation had won at the last election.

The opposition accused the government of having a system of buying votes and using threats of dismissal from work unless people voted the right way. One opposition member said with irony that the election had taken place with "fair and transparent irregularities". The opposition threatened to boycott parliament but did not call for any street protests.

Both government and opposition in Armenia praised the election and said it would strengthen the independence of Nagorno-Karabakh. The international election monitors praised the election, describing it as generally free and fair and meeting international democratic standards. One western election monitor said that many recognised states could use Nagorno-Karabakh as an example.

Party	District			Proportional			Total seats	+/–
Party	Votes	%	Seats	Votes	%	Seats	Total seats	+/–
Free Motherland	11,258	18.48	7			3	10	New
Democratic Party of Artsakh	10,126	16.62	5			5	10	–10
Armenian Revolutionary Federation	9,836	16.15	0				0	–9
Movement 88	737	1.21	0				0	New
Armenakan Party	526	0.86	0			0	0	–1
Armenia Our Home	311	0.51	0			0	0	New
Communist Party of Artsakh	295	0.48	0			0	0	New
Social Justice Party	27	0.04	0			0	0	New
ARF–M88						3	3	New
Independents	27,797	45.63	10				10	+8
Total	60,913	100.00	22			11	33	0
Valid votes	60,913	93.94						
Invalid/blank votes	3,928	6.06						
Total votes	64,841	100.00		66,998	–			
Registered voters/turnout	87,949	73.73		90,094	74.36			
Source: CEC

== Aftermath ==
The days after the election were overshadowed by the beating of an opposition candidate, Pavel Manukian, by members of the army, although it was denied that this had anything to do with the election. The first session of the new parliament took place on 30 June with the posts of speaker and deputy speaker being shared between the two pro-government parties.
