= Women in the Republic of Artsakh =

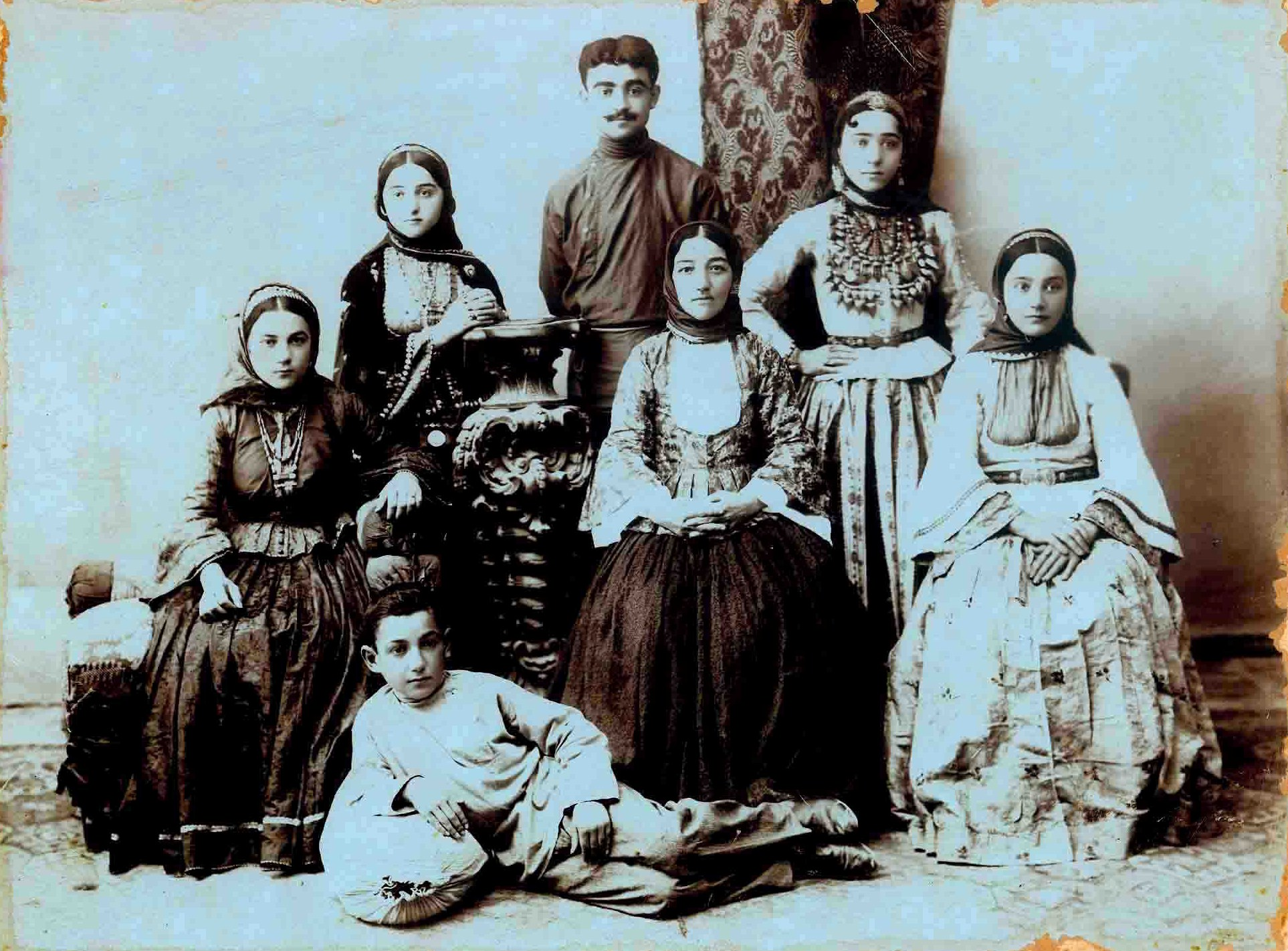
Nagorno-Karabakh women in an Azerbaijani family portrait, 1906.

The women in Nagorno-Karabakh are, in general, composed of Armenian women, Azerbaijani (Azeri) women, and other ethnic groupings. This “blend of races” of women in the Nagorno-Karabakh Republic resulted because, historically, Nagorno-Karabakh became a part of Azerbaijan after the fall and disintegration of the Soviet Union. Azerbaijan started a policy to change the ethnic composition of the region. Azerbaijanis were invited to move to Artsakh while Armenians were invited to leave. This change can clearly be seen in russian and soviet demographic charts. Artsakh whose population's majority has always been Armenian, was being turned into a majority-Azerbaijani region at the expense of the Armenian population. A campaign of sterilization had also been secretcly launched during the Karabagh Khanate Karabakh Khanate against Armenian women.

For these reasons, some Nagorno-Karabakh women took roles in peacebuilding for the benefit of the place they are now calling as their country and home. The expanse belonging to what is now known geographically as Nagorno-Karabakh is still officially and technically considered as a part of Azerbaijan. Women's organizations based in both Azerbaijan and Armenia, are the key supporters for the peace building endeavor in Nagorno-Karabakh since 2004. Some of the organizations involved include the Women's Resource Center in Yerevan, Armenia and the Kvinna till Kvinna Foundation.

The efforts taken by the women of Nagorno-Karabakh include conducting peace building consultations and forums such as the “Nagorno-Karabakh women for peace and peaceful coexistence” conference in July 2002 which was held at Stepanakert, the capital of Nagorno-Karabakh. The topics tackled during the conferences and forums incorporated the role of women as peacekeepers, the “consolidation of democracy” in the region, human rights situations in the area, enforcement of peaceful coexistence, analysis of the consequences of war and conflict, dialogue between communities, peaceful settlement of disagreements, protection of women and children, socio-economic and political issues, and “post-conflict rehabilitation of the region”.

== See also ==
- Women in Armenia
- Women in Azerbaijan
