= 2006 Nagorno-Karabakh constitutional referendum =

Nagorno-Karabakh constitutional referendum
- 10 December 2006

Results
Choice	Votes	%
Yes	77,279	99.29%
No	554	0.71%
Valid votes	77,833	99.29%
Invalid or blank votes	556	0.71%
Total votes	78,389	100.00%
Registered voters/turnout	90,077	87.02%

A constitutional referendum was held in the unrecognised republic of Nagorno-Karabakh on 10 December 2006 to approve a draft constitution, which defined Nagorno-Karabakh as a sovereign state. Azerbaijan condemned the referendum, saying it is an unconstitutional attempt to damage the peace process.

The constitution was approved by 99.28% of voters, with a turnout of 87%.

== Results ==
Choice	Votes	%
For	77,279	99.29
Against	554	0.71
Total	77,833	100.00
Valid votes	77,833	99.29
Invalid/blank votes	556	0.71
Total votes	78,389	100.00
Registered voters/turnout	90,077	87.02
Source: Direct Democracy

== See also ==
- 1991 Nagorno-Karabakh independence referendum
