= Rudik Hyusnunts =

Nagorno-Karabakh politician

- Occupation: legislator

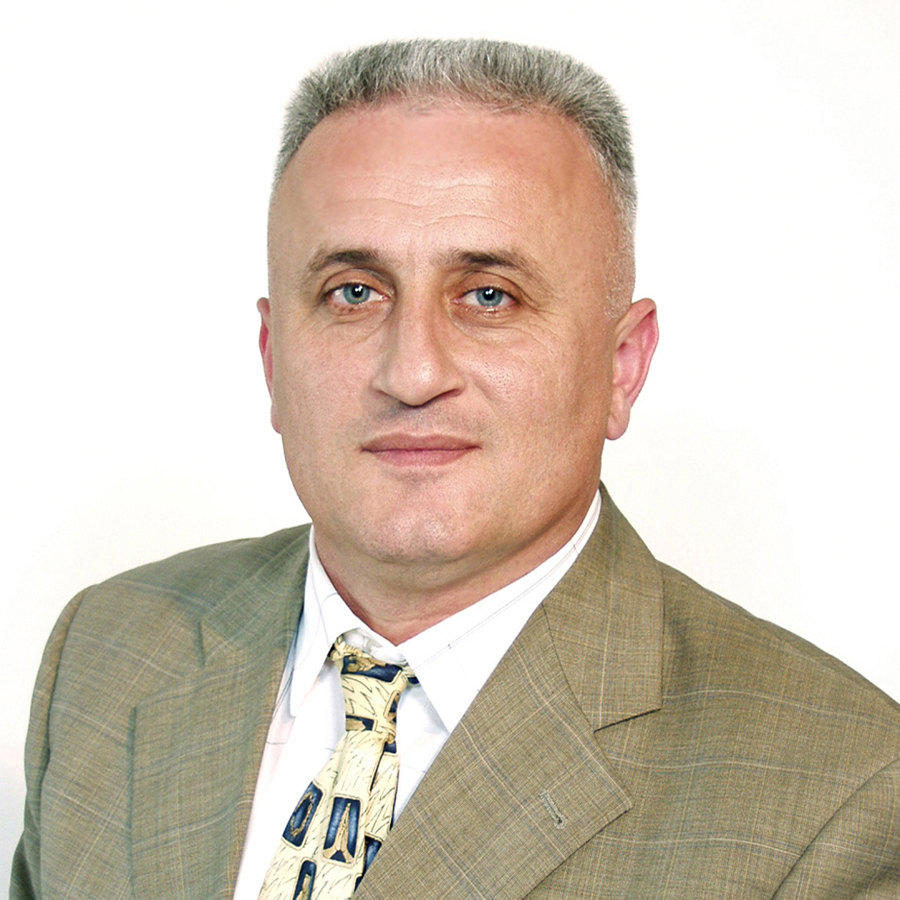
Rudik Hyusnunts

Rudik Hyusnunts is the former deputy speaker of the Nagorno-Karabakh legislature. He was also deputy chief of the Nagorno-Karabakh Security Council.
