= Martakert (disambiguation) =

Martakert, also Aghdara, is a town in Tartar District in the Nagorno-Karabakh region of Azerbaijan

Martakert may also refer to:

- Martakert Province, a province in the former self-proclaimed Republic of Artsakh (1991–2023), of which Martakert city was the provincial capital
- Mardakert District (NKAO), a district of the former Nagorno-Karabakh Autonomous Oblast of the Soviet era Azerbaijan Soviet Socialist Republic
