= Tourism in the Republic of Artsakh =

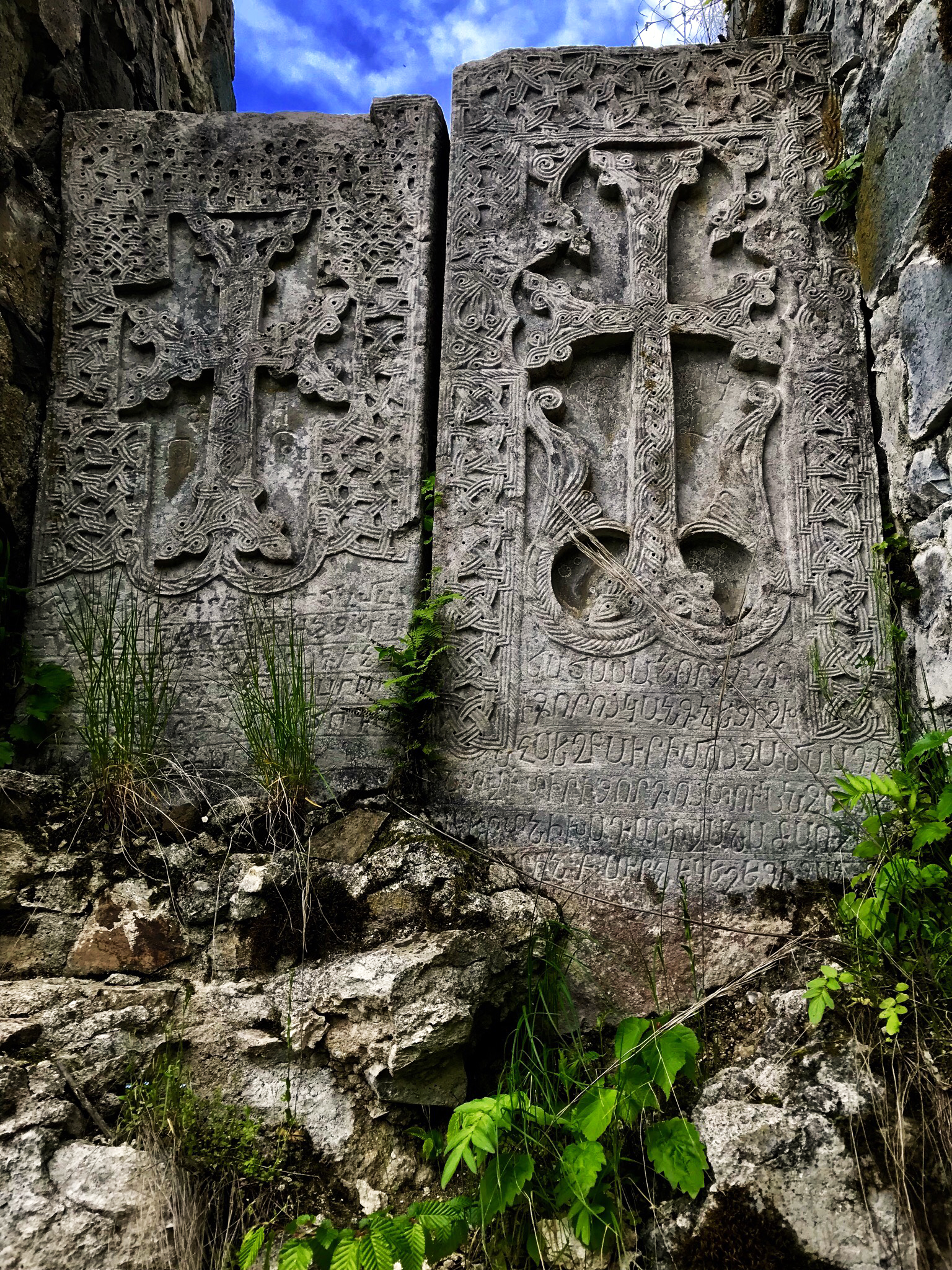
Khatchkars near Khatravank monastery in Vaguas village of Martakert province.

Tourism in the Republic of Artsakh was the main and fastest growing branch of the Artsakh Republic economy. For the purpose of regulating the tourism sphere, the Government of the Artsakh Republic adopted the Law on Tourism and Tourism Activities. The development of tourism in the Republic of Artsakh was carried out by the Tourism Department of the NKR Ministry of Economy. The region was populated mostly by Armenians and the primary spoken language was Armenian. It was located in the northeast of the Armenian Highland and mainly has a mountainous environment, famous for its rich and beautiful nature. The surface of Artsakh was divided by numerous mountain ranges: to the north were the ravines of Mrav, in the north-west the Eastern Sevan Mountains, in the west the Syunik Plateau, in the central part the Artsakh Ridge, from which a number of small mountain ridges were spread to the east. Artsakh is in a seismically active zone. The main policy objectives of the tourism sector were to promote international recognition of the independent state of the Artsakh Republic through tourism development, as well as to accelerate the process of increasing national income by becoming a popular tourist destination, resulting in increased employment in the tourism sector and increased living standards of the population.

In 2014 the number of tourists in NKR decreased by 12% compared to the previous year. However, the overnight stay of foreign tourists increased, as had the number of visitors from Armenia [2]. According to 2015 data, the number of tourists increased by 40% compared to the previous year, reaching an economic peak.

As of 2015, 16,000 tourists from 86 countries (including Armenia) arrived in Artsakh, spending about $6 million there.

April 18 was officially marked as the Day of Tourism and Attractions in the Republic of Artsakh.

== Events ==
=== Artsakh Wine Festival ===
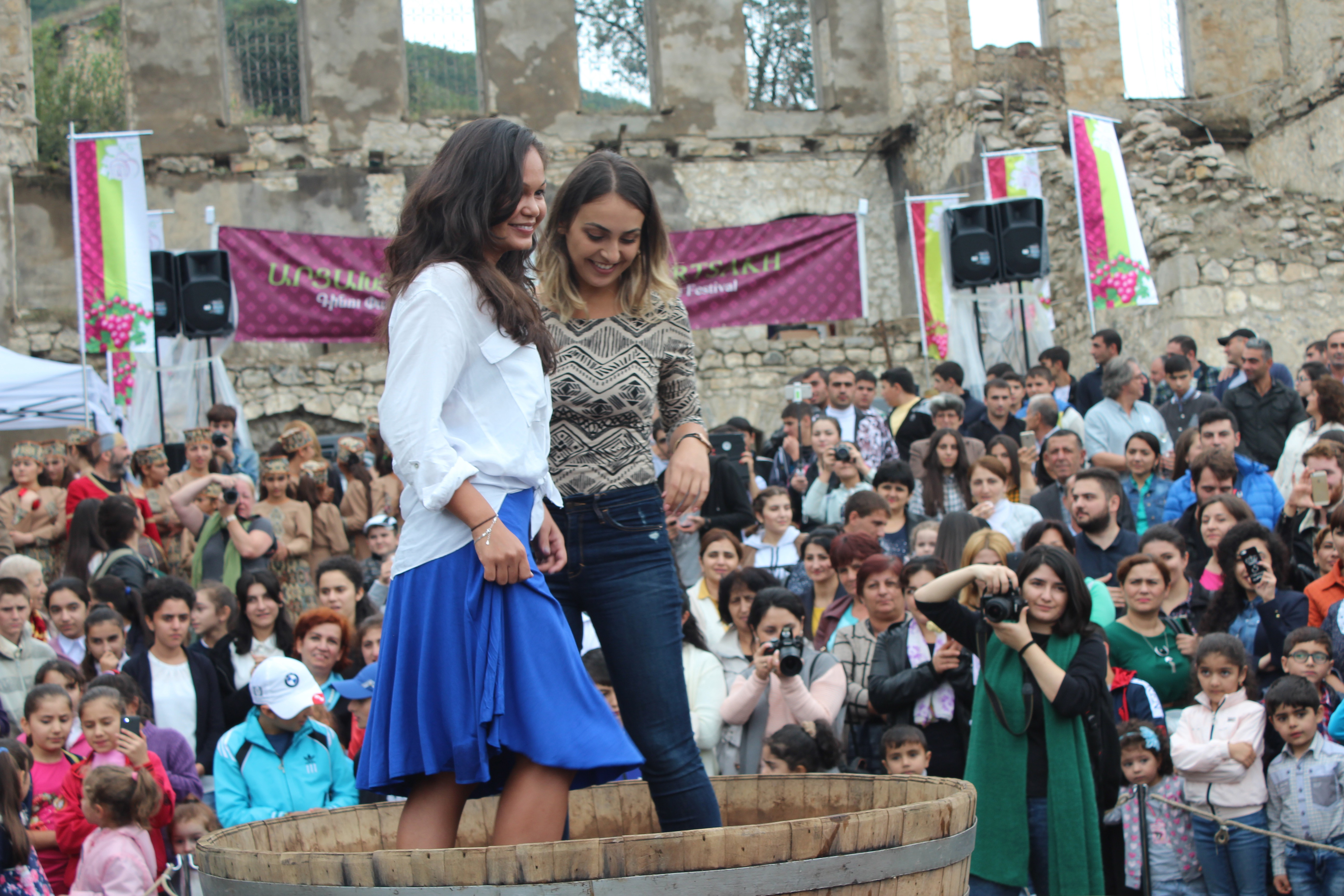
Third Wine Festival in Artsakh

Artsakh Wine Fest took place annually in Togh village of the Republic of Artsakh since 2014. The festival was held on the third Saturday of each September.

The festival was initiated by the Department of Tourism and Protection of Historical Places of the Ministry of Culture, Tourism and Youth Affairs of the Republic of Artsakh and is aimed to develop tourism in Artsakh. It was meant to restore Artsakh winemaking traditions. The festival provided a platform to the winemakers of Artsakh and Armenia giving them an opportunity to sell their products, exchange knowledge, promote their wine etc. The annual festival's program included grape stomping, tasting of traditional Artsakh cuisine, exhibition of artworks, exhibition of ancient artifacts that belonged to the Melik Yegan's Palace, as well as an exhibition and sale of local wine, where one could find products from 5 different regions of Artsakh and Armenia. Traditionally, the festival was accompanied by Armenian national singing and dancing. The festival had evolved into a national holiday.

== See also ==
- Tourism in Armenia
- Visa policy of Artsakh
