= Arthur Tovmasyan =

Arthur Tovmasyan Արթուր Թովմասյան

President of the National Assembly of Artsakh
- In office 21 May 2020 – 7 August 2023
- Preceded by: Ashot Ghulian
- Succeeded by: Davit Ishkhanyan

Personal details
- Born: 2 December 1962 (age 63) Stepanakert, Nagorno-Karabakh, Soviet Union
- Party: Free Motherland

Arthur Tovmasyan (Armenian: Արթուր Թովմասյան; born 2 December 1962) is an Artsakhi politician who was the President of the National Assembly of the breakaway state of the Republic of Artsakh from 21 May 2020 to 7 August 2023.
