= Democratic Party of Artsakh =

Democratic Party of Artsakh Արցախի ժողովրդավարական կուսակցություն
- Leader: Ashot Ghulian
- Founded: 2000 (as organization); 30 January 2005 (as party)
- Headquarters: Stepanakert
- Ideology: National conservatism
- Political position: Centre-right to right-wing
- European affiliation: European Free Alliance (associate)
- National Assembly: 2 / 33 (6%)

Website
- http://www.dpa.am

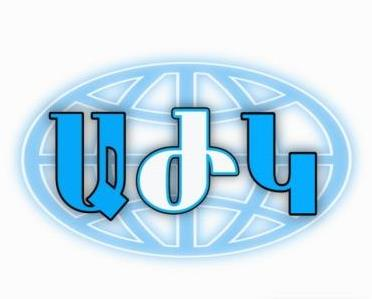
The party's original logo

The Democratic Party of Artsakh (Armenian: Արցախի ժողովրդավարական կուսակցություն, romanized: Artsakhi zhoghovrdavarakan kusaktsutyun; DPA, ԱԺԿ) is a political party in the Republic of Artsakh. It was founded on 30 January 2005. Before that, in 2000–2005 there was an acting socio-political organization called the "Democratic Artsakh Union". The Chairman of the party is Ashot Ghulian, who is also the President of the National Assembly. Following the results of the parliamentary elections of 19 June 2005, DPA won the most electoral votes and formed the "Democracy" faction in the National Assembly. As a result of the elections to the National Assembly of the 5th convocation, the faction was reformed with 10 members. After the Parliamentary elections of 3 May 2015, Democratic Party of Artsakh reformed its faction with 6 members (4 MPs were elected by a proportional system, 2 MPs by a majoritarian system).

== Ideology ==
According to its website, the DPA stands for the values of stability, establishing a powerful state, improving democracy, civil society, human rights and personal freedom and protection, family, work, and social justice, as well as the preservation of the national culture. Political pragmatism is practised whenever possible.

== Program ==
The main goals of the DPA are:

- to build a legal state where the rights of a person to live a free, safe, prosperous and dignified life are ensured;
- to strengthen of independent statehood, creation of a powerful, civilized state, enrichment and preservation of national identity;
- to build a civil society guided by national values, based on social solidarity, justice, tolerance and partnerships

In regards to the settlement of the Nagorno-Karabakh conflict, the party states in its charter that it supports "the reinstatement of the right of the people of the NKR to self-determination through the peaceful negotiations within the borders and with a security system acceptable to them."

== Electoral record ==
Parliamentary election results:

Year	Party-list			Constituency /total	Total seats	+/–
Year	Votes	%	Seats /total	Constituency /total	Total seats	+/–
2000	—N/a				20 /33	new
2005	10,126	16.62%	5 /11	5 /22	10 /33	▼10
2010	18,017	27.0%	5 /17	2 /16	7 /33	▼3
2015	13,105	19.10%	4 /22	2 /11	6 /33	▼1
2020	4,269	5.81%	—N/a		2 /33	▼4

== Foreign relations ==
On 17 April 2015, the Democratic Party of Artsakh was elected as an associate member of the European Free Alliance. On 2 September 2015, the DPA leader Ashot Ghoulyan and European Free Alliance president François Alfonsi signed a Declaration on Cooperation in Stepanakert.

== See also ==
- List of political parties in Artsakh
