= 1995 Nagorno-Karabakh parliamentary election =

Parliamentary elections were held in the Nagorno-Karabakh Republic on 30 April 1995. A total of 33 members of the National Assembly were elected. Voter turnout was 73.9%.
