= Edilli =

Edilli / Ukhtadzor Էդիլլու / Ուխտաձոր
- Location within Azerbaijan
- Coordinates: 39°33′39″N 47°04′09″E
- Country: Azerbaijan
- District: Khojavend

Population (2015)
  - Total: 309
- Time zone: UTC+4 (AZT)

Edilli (Azerbaijani: Edilli; Armenian: Էդիլլու, romanized: Edillu) or Ukhtadzor (Armenian: Ուխտաձոր) is a village in the Khojavend District of Azerbaijan, in the disputed region of Nagorno-Karabakh. The village had an ethnic Armenian-majority population prior to the 2020 Nagorno-Karabakh war, and also had an Armenian majority in 1989.

== History ==
During the Soviet period, the village was part of the Hadrut District of the Nagorno-Karabakh Autonomous Oblast. After the First Nagorno-Karabakh War, the village was administrated as part of the Hadrut Province of the breakaway Republic of Artsakh. The village came under the control of Azerbaijan during the Second Nagorno-Karabakh War.

On 4 October 2022, Azerbaijani sources reported the discovery of three sites of graves it claimed to belong to Azerbaijani military servicemen from the First Nagorno-Karabakh War in the village. As most of the buried soldiers had had their legs tied, Azerbaijani human rights lawyer Ziya Guliyev has described it "an example of a war crime."

== Historical heritage sites ==
Historical heritage sites in and around the village include the church of Surb Astvatsatsin (Armenian: Սուրբ Աստվածածին, lit. 'Holy Mother of God') built in 1692, and a cemetery from between the 17th and 19th centuries.

== Demographics ==
The village had 327 inhabitants in 2005, and 309 inhabitants in 2015.
