= 1997 Nagorno-Karabakh presidential election =

Early presidential elections were held in the Nagorno-Karabakh Republic on 1 September 1997 after President Robert Kocharyan was appointed Prime Minister of Armenia. The result was a victory for independent candidate Arkadi Ghukasyan, who received 89% of the vote.

== Results ==
Candidate	Party	Votes	%
Arkadi Ghukasyan	Independent	65,933	89.31
Arthur Tovmasyan	Independent	3,953	5.35
Boris Arushanyan	Independent	3,936	5.33
Total		73,822	100.00
Valid votes		73,822	96.81
Invalid/blank votes		2,435	3.19
Total votes		76,257	100.00
Registered voters/turnout		90,137	84.60
Source: CEC
