= Kochoghot =

Kochoghot Կոճողոտ
- Yayıcı
- Location within Azerbaijan Location within East Zangezur Economic Region
- Coordinates: 40°07′31″N 46°34′33″E
- Country: Azerbaijan
  - District: Aghdara
- Elevation: 1,053 m (3,455 ft)

Population (2015)
  - Total: 547
- Time zone: UTC+4 (AZT)

Kochoghot (Armenian: Կոճողոտ) or Yayiji (Azerbaijani: Yayıcı) is a village located in the Aghdara District of Azerbaijan, in the region of Nagorno-Karabakh. Until 2023 it was controlled by the breakaway Republic of Artsakh. The village had an ethnic Armenian-majority population until the expulsion of the Armenian population of Nagorno-Karabakh by Azerbaijan following the 2023 Azerbaijani offensive in Nagorno-Karabakh.

== History ==
During the Soviet period, the village was a part of the Mardakert District of the Nagorno-Karabakh Autonomous Oblast.

== Historical heritage sites ==
Historical heritage sites in and around the village include tombs from the 2nd–1st millennia BCE, a 13th-century village and cemetery, and the 17th-century church of Surb Astvatsatsin (Armenian: Սուրբ Աստվածածին, lit. 'Holy Mother of God').

== Economy and culture ==
The population is mainly engaged in agriculture, animal husbandry, and mining. As of 2015, the village has a municipal building, a secondary school, 11 shops, and a medical centre.

== Demographics ==
The village had 534 inhabitants in 2005, and 547 inhabitants in 2015.
