= 1991 Nagorno-Karabakh independence referendum =

10 December 1991
- Do you agree that the proclaimed Nagorno Karabakh Republic be a sovereign state, to independently determine the forms of cooperation with other states and communities?

Results
Choice	Votes	%
Yes	108,615	99.98%
No	24	0.02%
Valid votes	108,639	99.91%
Invalid or blank votes	95	0.09%
Total votes	108,734	100.00%
Registered voters/turnout	132,328	82.17%

An independence referendum was held in Nagorno-Karabakh on 10 December 1991. It was approved by 99.98% of voters.

The referendum was conducted according to the "Temporary Regulation on the Conduct of a Referendum in the Nagorno Karabakh Republic" that came into force on 27 November 1991 during the session of the Nagorno Karabakh Council of People's Deputies. Trilingual ballot papers (in Armenian, Azerbaijani and Russian) were sent to all parts of Nagorno-Karabakh, including the Azerbaijani-populated settlements, with a question: "Do you agree that the proclaimed Nagorno Karabakh Republic be a sovereign state, to independently determine the forms of cooperation with other states and communities?".

The referendum would be considered valid if at least the two-third of voters voted in favour with a turnout of at least 50%. From 132,328 citizens eligible to vote, 108,736 or 82% of the registered voters took part in the referendum, with 108,615 people (99.98%) voting "yes", 24 (0.02%) voting "no" and 97 ballot papers being invalid. The referendum was boycotted by the region's Azerbaijani residents, which then constituted 20% of the population. A group of independent observers following the course of the referendum presented their conclusion in the act on the results of the referendum. The voting process was covered by reporters from Russia and France, and a number of other periodicals and agencies, as well as TV channels of Russia, the United States and Bulgaria. According to the Ministry of Foreign Affairs, on the day of the referendum Stepanakert, and other Armenian settlements came under fire by Azerbaijani forces with 10 civilian deaths 11 wounded reported.

Neither the 1991 referendum nor the one that followed in 2006 were recognised as legitimate abroad. Nagorno-Karabakh continued to be internationally considered as de jure part of Azerbaijan.

== Results ==
Choice	Votes	%
For	108,615	99.98
Against	24	0.02
Total	108,639	100.00
Valid votes	108,639	99.91
Invalid/blank votes	97	0.09
Total votes	108,736	100.00
Registered voters/turnout	132,328	82.17
Source: Direct Democracy

== See also ==
- 1991 Armenian independence referendum
