= Artsakh Wine Fest =

Festival in Artsakh

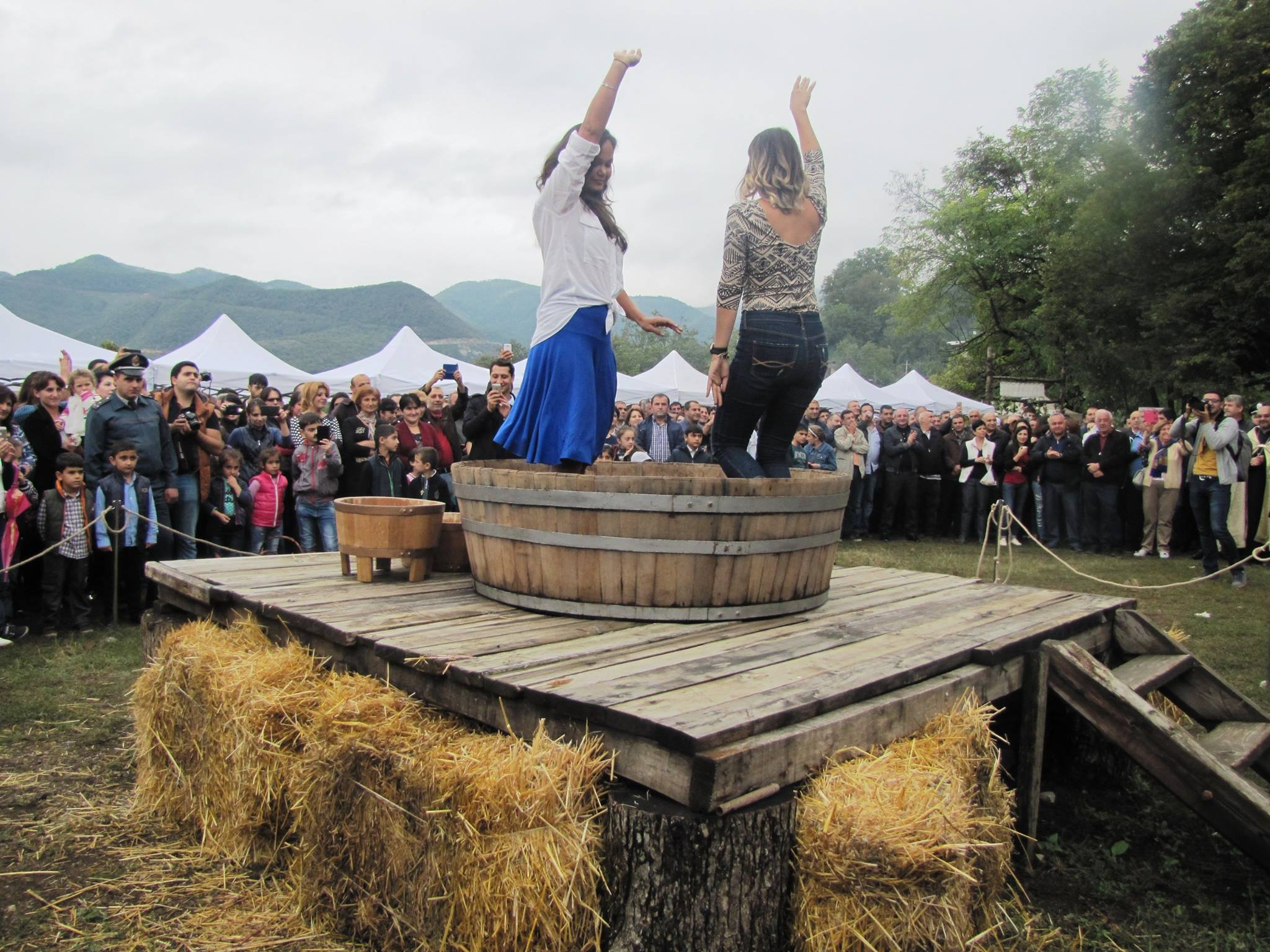
Grape stomping wine ritual

Artsakh Wine Fest (Armenian: Արցախյան գինու փառատոն) was a festival which took place annually since October 18, 2014, in the Tugh village of the Khojavend District of Azerbaijan, which before the 2020 Nagorno-Karabakh war was under the control of the self-proclaimed Republic of Artsakh as part of its Hadrut Province. The festival was of repetitive nature and was held on the third Saturday of each September.

== History ==
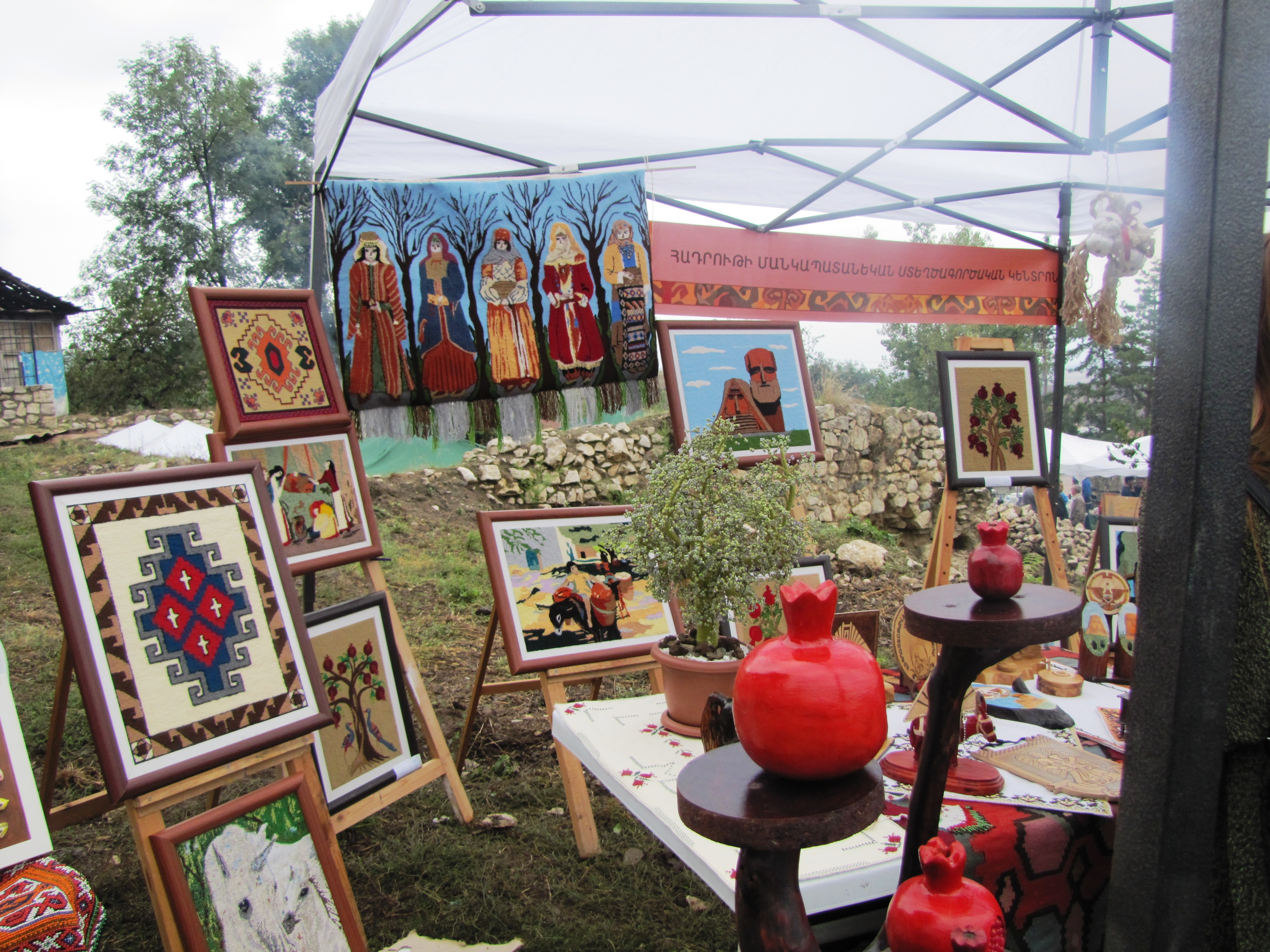
Exhibition of artworks at Artsakh Wine Fest

The festival was initiated by the Department of Tourism and Protection of Historical Places of the Ministry of Culture, Tourism and Youth Affairs of the Republic of Artsakh and was aimed to develop tourism in Artsakh. It was meant to restore Artsakh winemaking traditions. The festival provided a platform to the winemakers of Artsakh and Armenia giving them an opportunity to sell their products, exchange experience, promote their wine etc. The annual festival's program included grape stomping (a unique and ancient wine ritual), tasting of traditional Artsakh cuisine, exhibition of artworks, exhibition of ancient artefacts that belonged to the Melik Egan's Palace, as well as an exhibition and sale of local wine, where one could find products from 5 different regions of Artsakh and Armenia. Traditionally, the festival was accompanied by Armenian national singing and dancing. The festival evolved into a national holiday, year by year.

== See also ==
- Eeron Bagany
