= Arpat Avanesyan =

Azerbaijani scientist

- Occupations: Physicist, legislator

Arpat Avanesyan is a Physicist and legislator from Artsakh. Avanesyan is a past Rector of the State University of Mountainous Karabakh. He chairs the legislature's Finance Committee.
