= 2000 Nagorno-Karabakh parliamentary election =

- 18 June 2000
- 33 seats in the National Assembly; 17 seats needed for a majority
Party	Leader	Seats
Democratic Union		20
ARF		9
Armenakan		1
SDPA		1
Independents		2
This lists parties that won seats. See the complete results below.
President of the National Assembly before	President of the National Assembly after
Oleg Yesayan; Independent	Oleg Yesayan; Independent

Parliamentary elections were held in the Nagorno-Karabakh Republic on 18 June 2000. A total of 33 members of the National Assembly were elected. Voter turnout was 59.7%.

== Campaign ==
A total of 115 candidates contested the elections, of which 88 were independents and 25 were members of political parties.

== Results ==
Party	Votes	%	Seats
Democratic Artsakh Union			20
Armenian Revolutionary Federation			9
Armenakan Party			1
Social and Democratic Party of Artsakh			1
Independents			2
Total			33
Total votes	51,267	–	
Registered voters/turnout		59.7	
Source: CEC
