= Khndzristan, Nagorno-Karabakh =

Khndzristan / Almaly Խնձրիստան / Almalı
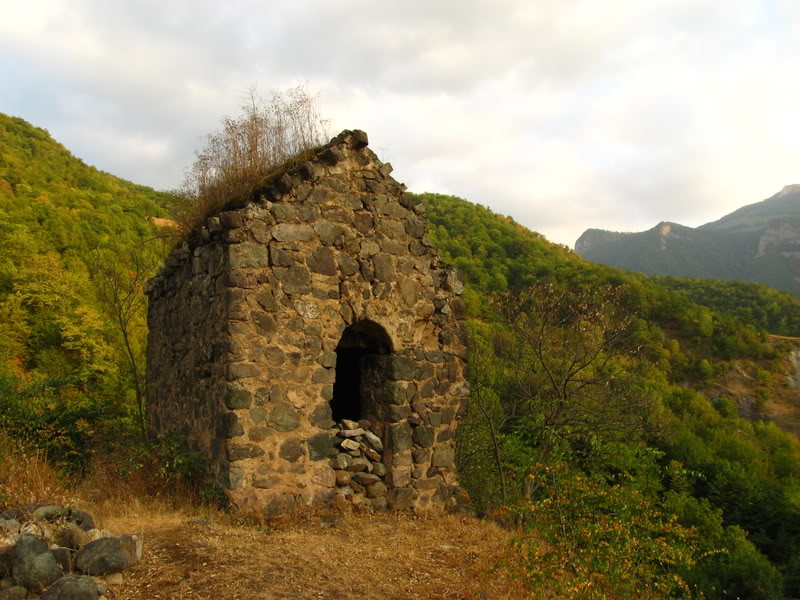
- A shrine near the village

- Location within Azerbaijan Location within Karabakh Economic Region
- Coordinates: 39°58′05″N 46°41′15″E
- Country: Azerbaijan
  - District: Khojaly
- Elevation: 986 m (3,235 ft)

Population (2015)
  - Total: 738
- Time zone: UTC+4 (AZT)

Khndzristan (Armenian: Խնձրիստան) or Almaly (Azerbaijani: Almalı) is a village in the Khojaly District of Azerbaijan, in the region of Nagorno-Karabakh. Until 2023 it was controlled by the breakaway Republic of Artsakh. The village had an ethnic Armenian-majority population until the expulsion of the Armenian population of Nagorno-Karabakh by Azerbaijan following the 2023 Azerbaijani offensive in Nagorno-Karabakh.

== Name ==
The Armenian name of the village literally means 'place of apples' and supposedly derives from the fact that there were many apple trees on the site of the village. The Azerbaijani name of the village is composed of the word alma 'apple' and the adjective-forming suffix -lı.

== Geography ==
The village is located in a hilly, forested area on the right side of the river Khachinchay. There are many springs in the village's vicinity.

== History ==
In the past, part of the village's population came from the now-ruined nearby settlement called Bren Shen. In 1772, an oil press was founded in the village, the stones of which were later used to build a silken goods factory. Historically, the village was the seat of the Melik-Mirzakhanian meliks (local Armenian lords). In the 18th century, a member of this dynasty, Mirza Khan, who was the overseer of Khndzristan, conspired with Melik Shahnazar II and Panah Ali Khan to assassinate Melik Allahverdi of Khachen. Mirza Khan then received Allahverdi's melikdom as a reward. At one point, Azerbaijanis from the village moved and founded a new village to the south of Aghdam, naming it Xındırıstan after their original village. During the Soviet period, the village was a part of the Askeran District of the Nagorno-Karabakh Autonomous Oblast.

== Historical sites ==
Historical sites in and around the village include an 11th–12th-century khachkar, the 12th–13th-century church of Hangats Yeghtsi, a 12th–13th-century cemetery, and the Holy Mother of God (Surb Astvatsatsin) Church, built in 1754, where the village's meliks are buried.

== Economy and culture ==
The population is mainly engaged in agriculture and animal husbandry. As of 2015, the village has a municipal building, a house of culture, a secondary school, a kindergarten, two shops and a medical centre.

== Demographics ==
The village had 738 inhabitants in 2015 and 814 inhabitants in 2005.
