= 2010 Nagorno-Karabakh parliamentary election =

- 23 May 2010
- All 33 seats in the National Assembly
Party	Leader	Vote %	Seats	+/–
Free Motherland	Arayik Harutyunyan	46.39	14	+4
Democratic Party	Ashot Ghulian	28.58	6	−4
ARF	Vitaly Balasanian	20.18	6	+3
Independents	–	–	7	−3
This lists parties that won seats. See the complete results below.
Prime Minister before	Prime Minister after
Arayik Harutyunyan; Free Motherland	Arayik Harutyunyan; Free Motherland

Parliamentary elections were held in the Nagorno-Karabakh Republic on 23 May 2010.

== Background ==
Nagorno-Karabakh declared its independence from Azerbaijan in 1991. The First Nagorno-Karabakh War took place between 1988 and 1994 which resulted in Nagorno-Karabakh, with Armenian support, becoming de facto independent from Azerbaijan. However it has not been internationally recognised and Azerbaijan still claims the area as part of its state.

Several changes to the election process were made since the previous election in 2005. Whereas previously, 22 of the parliament's 33 seats were filled using party-list proportional representation and 11 using first-past-the-post, the distribution for these elections is 17–16. Another change concerns the lowering of the election threshold from 10% to 6% (for political parties) and from 15% to 8% (for electoral blocs).

A total of 94,900 voters are registered for the election, about 66% of the total population of Nagorno-Karabakh.

== Contesting parties ==
Before the elections, it became clear very few opposition parties would contest. Four parties contesting the 17 list-based seats are registered: Free Motherland (FM), led by Prime Minister Arayik Harutyunyan, the Democratic Party of Artsakh (DPA), the Armenian Revolutionary Federation (ARM) and the Communist Party of Artsakh (CPA). Of these parties, only the communists did not support president Bako Sahakyan in the 2007 election. 44 More candidates stand for election in the 16 FPTP constituencies.

== Opinion polls ==
Institute	Date	FM	DPA	ARF	CPA	Independents
Sociometer Center	May 2010	13	11	5	0	4

== Results ==
With about 50% of the votes counted, Free Motherland led the count with 45.8% of the votes. The DPA was at 30.7% and the ARF at 18.2%. The CP was below the electoral threshold of 6% (5.34%), which means it might be difficult for them to get a seat.

The Communist Party failed to cross the electoral threshold and did not win any seats.

Party	Proportional			Constituency			Total seats	+/–
Party	Votes	%	Seats	Votes	%	Seats	Total seats	+/–
Free Motherland	29,252	46.39	8			6	14	+4
Democratic Party of Artsakh	18,017	28.58	5			1	6	–4
Armenian Revolutionary Federation	12,725	20.18	4			2	6	+3
Communist Party of Artsakh	3,057	4.85	0			0	0	0
Independents						7	7	–3
Total	63,051	100.00	17			16	33	0
Valid votes	63,051	94.43						
Invalid/blank votes	3,720	5.57						
Total votes	66,771	100.00						
Registered voters/turnout	98,518	67.78		95,866	–			
Source: CEC, Caucasian Knot

== Reactions ==
About 120 international observers from France, Russia, USA, Italy, Germany, Greece, Great Britain, Argentina, Ireland, Czech Republic, Denmark, Iran, Netherlands, Canada, Slovakia, South Ossetia, Abkhazia, Transnistria, and others, as well as a big group of observers from Armenia observed the elections. Later the Iranian foreign ministry spokesperson Ramin Mehmanparast stated that Iran had not delegated any observers. Azerbaijan made a black list of the international observers who visited Nagorno-Karabakh and declared them personae non-gratae.

Various international organisations and countries issued statements refusing to recognise the 2010 elections in Nagorno-Karabakh, among them the Organization for Security and Co-operation in Europe, the European Union, the United Kingdom, France, Iran, Russia, Turkey, and Lithuania.
