= Armenia–Artsakh relations =

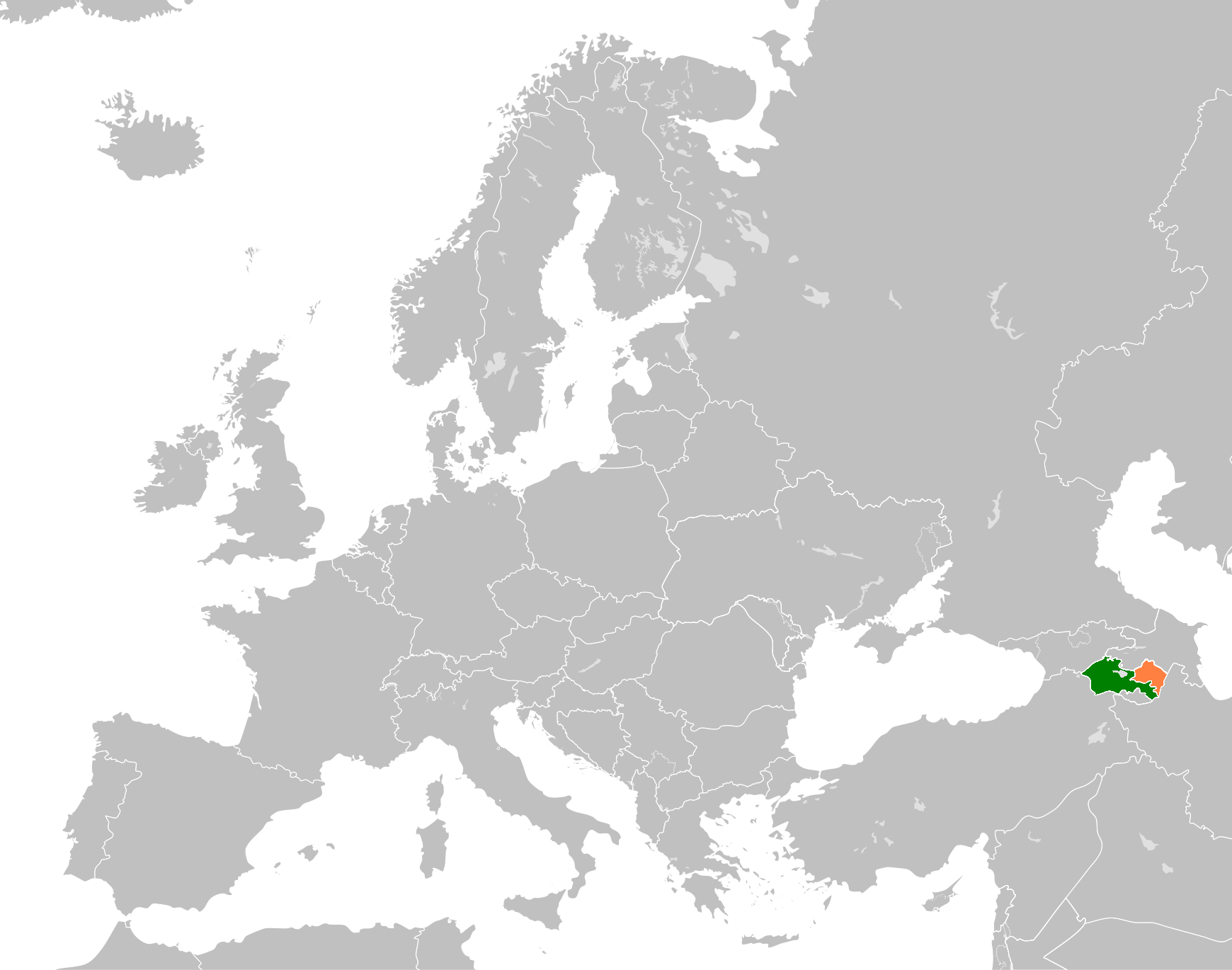

- Armenia: Republic of Artsakh

Diplomatic mission
- Permanent Representation of the NKR in Armenia: None

Armenia–Artsakh relations were the foreign relations between the former unrecognized Republic of Artsakh and Armenia. The Republic of Artsakh controlled most of the territory of the former Nagorno-Karabakh Autonomous Oblast (before the Second Nagorno-Karabakh War, it also controlled some of the surrounding area). Artsakh had very close relations with Armenia. It functioned as a de facto part of Armenia. A representative office of Nagorno-Karabakh exists in Yerevan.

== History ==
=== Kingdom of Artsakh ===
The House of Khachen ruled the medieval Kingdom of Artsakh in the 11th century as an independent kingdom under the protectorate of the Bagratid Kingdom of Armenia.

=== Soviet era unification proposals ===
Under the Soviet Union, the Nagorno-Karabakh Autonomous Oblast was an autonomous oblast within the Azerbaijan Soviet Socialist Republic, whose population was mostly ethnic Armenians. On this basis, there were many calls for internal unification with the Armenian Soviet Socialist Republic.

==== Early 20th-century history ====
Although the question of Nagorno-Karabakh's status did not become a major public issue until the mid-1980s, Armenian intellectuals, Soviet Armenian and Karabakh Armenian leadership periodically made appeals to Moscow for the region's transfer to Soviet Armenia. In 1945, the leader of Soviet Armenia Grigory Arutinov appealed to Stalin to attach the region to Soviet Armenia, which was rejected.

==== Late 20th-century history ====
After Stalin's death, Armenian discontent began to be voiced. In 1963, around 2,500 Karabakh Armenians signed a petition calling for Karabakh to be put under Armenian control or to be transferred to Russia. The same year saw violent clashes in Stepanakert, leading to the death of 18 Armenians. In 1965 and 1977, there were large demonstrations in Yerevan calling to unify Karabakh with Armenia.

In 1985, Mikhail Gorbachev came to power as the new general secretary of the Soviet Union and began implementing plans to reform the Soviet Union, encapsulated in two policies: perestroika and glasnost. While perestroika had to do with structural and economic reform, glasnost or "openness" granted limited freedom to Soviet citizens to express grievances about the Soviet system and leaders. Capitalizing on this, the leaders of the Regional Soviet of Karabakh decided to vote in favor of unifying the autonomous region with Armenia on 20 February 1988.

Karabakh Armenian leaders complained that the region had neither Armenian language textbooks in schools nor in television broadcasting, and that Azerbaijan's Communist Party General Secretary Heydar Aliyev had attempted to extensively "Azerify" the region, increasing the influence and number of Azerbaijanis living in Nagorno-Karabakh, while at the same time reducing its Armenian population. Aliyev stepped down as General Secretary of Azerbaijan's Politburo, in 1987. The Armenian population of Karabakh had dwindled to nearly three-quarters of the total population by the late 1980s.

The movement was spearheaded by popular Armenian figures. In February 1988, Armenians began protesting and staging workers' strikes in Yerevan, demanding unification with the enclave.

On 20 February 1988, the leaders of the regional Soviet of Karabakh voted in favour of unifying the autonomous region with Armenia in a resolution reading:

Welcoming the wishes of the workers of the Nagorny Karabakh Autonomous Region to request the Supreme Soviets of the Azerbaijani SSR and the Armenian SSR to display a feeling of deep understanding of the aspirations of the Armenian population of Nagorny Karabakh and to resolve the question of transferring the Nagorny Karabakh Autonomous Region from the Azerbaijani SSR to the Armenian SSR, at the same time to intercede with the Supreme Soviet of the USSR to reach a positive resolution on the issue of transferring the region from the Azerbaijani SSR to the Armenian SSR.

On 10 March, Gorbachev stated that the borders between the republics would not change, in accordance with Article 78 of the Soviet constitution. Gorbachev said that several other regions in the Soviet Union were yearning for territorial changes and redrawing the boundaries in Karabakh would thus set a dangerous precedent. The Armenians viewed the 1921 Kavburo decision with disdain and felt they were correcting a historical error through the principle of self-determination (a right also granted in the constitution).

On 23 March 1988, the Supreme Soviet of the Soviet Union rejected the demands of Armenians to cede Nagorno-Karabakh to Armenia. Troops were sent to Yerevan to prevent protests against the decision. Gorbachev's attempts to stabilize the region were to no avail, as both sides remained equally intransigent. In Armenia, there was a firm belief that what had taken place in the region of Nakhichevan would be repeated in Nagorno-Karabakh: prior to its absorption by Soviet Russia, it had a population which was 40% Armenian; by the late 1980s, its Armenian population was virtually non-existent.

=== Post-Soviet era ===
==== First Nagorno-Karabakh War ====
After independence from the Soviet Union, the newly created Republic of Armenia publicly denied any involvement in providing any weapons, fuel, food, or other logistics to secessionists in Nagorno-Karabakh. President Levon Ter-Petrosyan later admitted to supplying them with logistical supplies and paying the salaries of the separatists, but denied sending any of its own men into combat.

The only land connection Armenia had with Karabakh was through the narrow, mountainous Lachin corridor which could only be reached by helicopters.

==== Post-War ====
Since 1998, Armenian politics had been dominated by the "Karabakh clan" led by Robert Kocharyan and Serzh Sargsyan both of whom originating from Nagorno-Karabakh until they were ousted in the Velvet Revolution in 2018. Bako Sahakyan, who had been President of Artsakh since 2007, had been seen as their staunch ally.

Armenia has not endorsed any candidate in the 2020 Artsakhian general election. The winning candidate Arayik Harutyunyan was seen Nikol Pashinyan first choice. While Masis Mayilyan had been noted to be closer to Nikol Pashinyan ideologically, Harutyunyan (who had been close to Kocharyan and Serzh Sargsyan) came out to publicly endorse the Velvet Revolution and observers noted that Pashinyan "to lean too publicly in favor of one candidate over another" and he stated that he does "not want to see a revolution or a counter-revolution in Artsakh."

==== Second Nagorno-Karabakh War and peace negotiations ====
In 2020, the Nagorno-Karabakh conflict boiled over into a war. Armenia once again supported Artsakh during the conflict against Azerbaijan. At the end of the conflict, a peace deal was signed which served as a victory for Azerbaijan. Armenian Prime Minister Nikol Pashinyan called it "incredibly painful both for me and both for our people".

In April 2022, during peace negotiations with Azerbaijan, Armenia signaled willingness to hand control of the Nagorno-Karabakh region over to Azerbaijan. Armenian Prime Minister Nikol Pashinyan stated that the international community had pressured Armenia to "lower the bar a bit" on Artsakh's status. This drew immediate criticism from Artsakh officials. Artsakh's Foreign Minister David Babayan stated that "Any attempt to incorporate Artsakh into Azerbaijan would lead to bloodshed and the destruction of Artsakh". In a unanimous resolution, the parliament of Artsakh demanded that Armenia "abandon their current disastrous position."

A politician from the Askeran district of Artsakh floated the idea of a referendum to join Russia, saying that this would "avoid physical annihilation" and "save the remains of the shattered Artsakh".

In May 2023, Armenia stated that it is willing to recognize Karabakh as a part of Azerbaijan. After the collapse of Artsakh, Armenia announced that it does not have any intention to start a counter-offensive.

On 1 January 2024, the Republic of Artsakh was dissolved. Shortly after, the government of Artsakh established a government-in-exile based in Yerevan, Armenia. Pashinyan rejected the GiE. On 14 June, Pashinyan accused them of encouraging Karabakh Armenian refugees to participate in antigovernment protests. The Artsakh government-in-exile in Yerevan strongly opposes the peace negotiations between Armenia and Azerbaijan and the normalization process between Armenia and Turkey.

== Resident diplomatic missions ==
- Artsakh has a representative office in Yerevan.

== See also ==
- Foreign relations of Armenia
- Foreign relations of Artsakh

== Bibliography ==
- de Waal, Thomas (2003). Black Garden: Armenia and Azerbaijan Through Peace and War. New York: New York University Press. ISBN 9780814719459.
