= Free Motherland =

Free Motherland Ազատ Հայրենիք Կուսակցություն Azat Hayrenik Kusaktsutyun
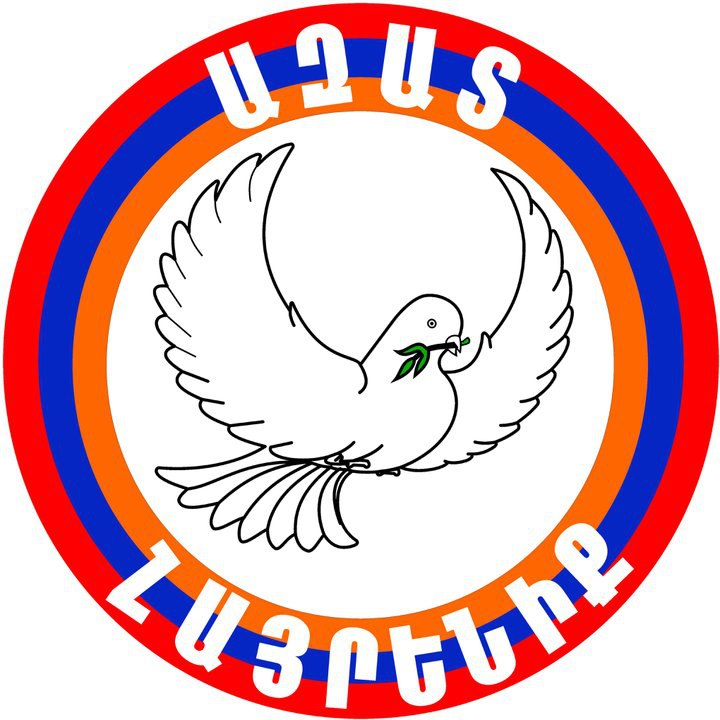
- Co-Presidents: Arayik Harutyunyan; Arthur Tovmasyan; Rudik Hyusnunts; Arpat Avanesyan
- Founded: 29 January 2005
- Headquarters: Stepanakert; In exile: Yerevan
- Newspaper: Akunk
- Ideology: Armenian nationalism
- Political position: Centre-right
- National affiliation: Free Motherland - UCA Alliance
- Colors: Orange
- National Assembly: 16 / 33 (48%)

Free Motherland (Armenian: «Ազատ Հայրենիք» կուսակցություն, Azat Hayrenik kusaktsutyun) abbreviated as ԱՀԿ or AHK was a political party in Artsakh. The party was formed on 29 January 2005. Initially, the party consisted of four co-presidents: Arayik Harutyunyan, Arthur Tovmasyan, Rudik Hyusnunts and Arpat Avanesyan. The party currently operates in-exile in Armenia following the 2023 Azerbaijani offensive in Nagorno-Karabakh.

== History ==
The party was founded on 29 January 2005. The chairman of the party is former Prime Minister Araik Harutyunyan. The party participated in the 2005 Nagorno-Karabakh parliamentary election, after which the party received 10 out of 33 seats in the National Assembly.

Following the 2010 Nagorno-Karabakh parliamentary election, the party won 14 seats in the National Assembly, both in direct and proportional electoral systems. The head of the faction was Gagik Petrosyan.

Following the 2015 Nagorno-Karabakh parliamentary election, the Free Motherland Party won 47.3% of the vote and together with those elected by the majority system, received 15 seats and made up a parliamentary majority. The head of the faction is Arthur Tovmasyan.

The party participated in 2020 Artsakhian general election as part of the Free Motherland - UCA Alliance, which won 16 seats out of 33 in the National Assembly.

== Electoral record ==
Year	Alliance	Party-list			Constituency /total	Total seats	+/–
Year	Alliance	Votes	%	Seats /total	Constituency /total	Total seats	+/–
2005	none	11,258	18.48%	3 / 11	7 / 22	10 / 33	new
2010	none	29,252	44.2%	8 / 17	6 / 16	14 / 33	▲4
2015	none	32,632	47.35%	11 / 22	4 / 11	15 / 33	▲1
2020	part of Free Motherland - UCA Alliance	29,688	40.43%	—N/a		16 / 33	▲1

== Program ==
The program of the party is a document expressing the national interests of the Artsakh people, their freedom, security and the right to self-determination. The party is a political association of the NKR on a voluntary basis. Objectives include: a) together with like-minded people to improve social justice, b) to revive the people's faith in their own strengths and a brighter future, c) create conditions for the formation of the middle class, d) promote the spiritual revival of the people and increase the role of the Armenian Apostolic Church.

== Ideology ==
The party maintains a centre-right ideology. The party advocates for a national and religious identity, economic development, preservation of language, educational system reform, and supports cultural patriotism and military spirit. The main difference from other Armenian and Artsakh parties is the support of economic development over democratic transformations. The party believes that economic development will help to achieve Artsakh's independence, while strengthening the establishment of civil society and democracy.

== Central Council ==
Important decisions of the party are made up by a Central Council consisting of 55 persons, by either open or closed voting:

- Harutyunyan Araik
- Petrosyan Gagik
- Tovmasyan Arthur
- Avanesyan Arpat
- Hyusnunts Rudik
- Jivanyan Hovik
- Dadayan Romela
- Kasparyan Grigory
- Harutyunyan Valery
- Petrosyan Karlen
- Esayan Samvel
- Adamyan Karen
- Azatyan Kamo
- Alibabyan Gennady
- Alaverdyan Hamlet
- Aghajanyan Anaida
- Aghajanyan Samvel
- Virabyan Samvel
- Arustamyan Arto
- Arushanyan Vigen
- Asryan Murad
- Asryan Asya
- Avanesyan Ivan
- Beglaryan David
- Beglaryan Erik
- Gasparyan Grigory
- Grigoryan Aram
- Grigoryan Garry
- Grigoryan Oleg
- Dadasyan Arthur
- Israelyan Rudolf
- Israelyan Ruslan
- Galstyan Armo
- Khachatryan Qajik
- Tsaturyan Armen
- Hayrapetyan Aleksey
- Nasibyan Hrachik
- Harutyunyan Stanislav
- Mirzoyan Artak
- Mikaelyan Vladimir
- Mikaelyan Arsen
- Mkhitaryan Artush
- Mnatsakanyan Serob
- Narimanyan Kamo
- Poghosyan Vahram
- Hayrapetyan Susanna
- Saryan Sumbat
- Virabyan Michael
- Ulubabyan Vardges
- Qocharyan Kamo
- Ohanyan Armen
- Petrosyan Arthur
- Hakobyan Anna
- Ohanjanyan Ararat

== See also ==
- List of political parties in Artsakh
