= 1991–92 Nagorno-Karabakh parliamentary election =

Parliamentary elections were held in the Nagorno-Karabakh Republic on 28 December 1991, with a second round on 4 January 1992. A total of 81 members of the National Assembly were elected.

These were the first elections held following the regions 10 December 1991 independence referendum.

== Electoral system ==
The elections were held using the two-round system in 81 single-member constituencies.

== Results ==
The result was a victory for the Armenian Revolutionary Federation party, which won a majority of seats. Voting did not take place in six constituencies held by Azeri forces.

== See also ==
- Politics of Artsakh
