= Elections in Artsakh =

Elections in the Republic of Artsakh

The Republic of Artsakh, while it existed, held national elections for president and a National Assembly. Artsakh developed into a multi-party system. The state was dissolved by 1 January 2024 in the aftermath of Azerbaijani offensive in Nagorno-Karabakh.

== President ==
The president was elected for a five-year term by direct vote. The 2017 constitution restricted a president to two terms.

== National Assembly ==
The election for the first National Assembly (Azgayin Zhoghov) took place on 28 December 1991; each of the 81 members represented a district (metsamasnakan) for a five-year term. In the second and third elections, on 30 April 1995 and 18 June 2000, the number of members was reduced to 33, still representing districts. In every subsequent election, however, the number of district members declined and the number chosen by proportional representation by party (voters also chose the party they preferred) from lists submitted by the parties. In 2005, there were 22 district members and 11 from party lists. In 2010, there were 16 and 17, respectively; in 2015, there were 11 and 22; and in the final election, in 2020, all 33 came from party lists.

There was also a gender quota for Assembly members. At some point, at least one woman had to be among the first six candidates on each party list. In 2019, legislation was passed requiring that at least 25% of list candidates were women.

Parties had to receive a threshold percentage of the vote to qualify for Assembly seats. In 2014, amendments to the electoral code reduced this to 5%, 7% if part of a party alliance.

== Synchronization of elections ==
Prior to 2020, elections for president and the Assembly took place in different years. The 2017 constitution required that they occur at the same time. In order to make this happen, the Assembly chose a transitional president, then president Bako Sahakyan, who remained in power for an additional three years.

== See also ==
- Elections in Armenia
- Foreign relations of Artsakh
- List of political parties in Artsakh
- National Assembly (Artsakh)
- Politics of Artsakh
