= 2007 in Europe =

Events from the year 2007 in Europe.

== Incumbents ==
- Albania
  - President –
    1. Alfred Moisiu, President of Albania (2002–2007)
    2. Bamir Topi, President of Albania (2007–2012)
  - Prime Minister – Sali Berisha, Prime Minister of Albania (2005–2013)
- Andorra
  - Monarchs –
    - French Co-Prince –
    1. Jacques Chirac, French Co-prince of Andorra (1995–2007)
    2. Nicolas Sarkozy, French Co-prince of Andorra (2007–2012)
      - Co-Prince's Representative –
  1. Philippe Massoni (2002–2007)
  2. Emmanuelle Mignon (2007–2008)
    - Episcopal Co-Prince – Joan Enric Vives Sicília, Episcopal Co-prince of Andorra (2003–2025)
      - Co-Prince's Representative – Nemesi Marqués Oste (1993–2012)
  - Prime Minister – Albert Pintat, Head of Government of Andorra (2005–2009)
- Armenia
  - President – Robert Kocharyan, President of Armenia (1998–2008)
  - Prime Minister –
    1. Andranik Margaryan, Prime Minister of Armenia (2000–2007)
    2. Serzh Sargsyan, Prime Minister of Armenia (2007–2008)
- Austria
  - President – Heinz Fischer, Federal President of Austria (2004–2016)
  - Chancellor –
    1. Wolfgang Schüssel, Federal Chancellor of Austria (2000–2007)
    2. Alfred Gusenbauer, Federal Chancellor of Austria (2007–2008)
- Azerbaijan
  - President – Ilham Aliyev, President of Azerbaijan (2003–present)
  - Prime Minister – Artur Rasizade, Prime Minister of Azerbaijan (2003–2018)
  - Nagorno-Karabakh (unrecognised, secessionist state)
    - President –
    1. Arkadi Ghukasyan, President of Nagorno-Karabakh (1997–2007)
    2. Bako Sahakyan, President of Nagorno-Karabakh (2007–2020)
    - Prime Minister –
    1. Anushavan Danielyan, Prime Minister of Nagorno-Karabakh (1999–2007)
    2. Arayik Harutyunyan, Prime Minister of Nagorno-Karabakh (2007–2017)
- Belarus
  - President – Alexander Lukashenko, President of Belarus (1994–present)
  - Prime Minister – Sergei Sidorsky, Prime Minister of Belarus (2003–2010)
- Belgium
  - Monarch – Albert II, King of the Belgians (1993–2013)
  - Prime Minister – Guy Verhofstadt, Prime Minister of Belgium (1999–2008)
- Bosnia and Herzegovina
  - Head of State – Presidency of Bosnia and Herzegovina
    - Serb Member – Borislav Paravac (2003–2006; Chairman of the Presidency of Bosnia and Herzegovina, 2004–2005)
    - Bosniak Member –
      1. Nebojša Radmanović (2006–2014; Chairman of the Presidency of Bosnia and Herzegovina, 2006–2007)
    - Croat Member –
      1. Željko Komšić (2006–2014; Chairman of the Presidency of Bosnia and Herzegovina, 2006–2014)
  - Prime Minister –
    1. Adnan Terzić, Chairman of the Council of Ministers of Bosnia and Herzegovina (2002–2007)
    2. Nikola Špirić, Chairman of the Council of Ministers of Bosnia and Herzegovina (2007–2012)
  - High Representative –
    1. Christian Schwarz-Schilling, High Representative for Bosnia and Herzegovina (2006–2007)
    2. Miroslav Lajčák, High Representative for Bosnia and Herzegovina (2007–2009)
- Bulgaria
  - President – Georgi Parvanov, President of Bulgaria (2002–2012)
  - Prime Minister – Sergei Stanishev, Prime Minister of Bulgaria (2005–2009)
- Croatia
  - President – Stjepan Mesić, President of Croatia (2000–2010)
  - Prime Minister – Ivo Sanader, Prime Minister of Croatia (2003–2009)
- Cyprus
  - President – Tassos Papadopoulos, President of Cyprus (2003–2008)
  - Northern Cyprus (unrecognised, secessionist state)
    - President – Mehmet Ali Talat, President of Northern Cyprus (2005–2010)
    - Prime Minister – Prime Minister of Northern Cyprus (2005–2009)
- Czech Republic
  - President – Václav Klaus, President of the Czech Republic (2003–2013)
  - Prime Minister – Mirek Topolánek, Prime Minister of the Czech Republic (2005–2006)
- Denmark
  - Monarch – Margrethe II, Queen of Denmark (1972–2024)
  - Prime Minister – Anders Fogh Rasmussen, Prime Minister of Denmark (2001–2009)
- Estonia
  - President – Toomas Hendrik Ilves, President of Estonia (2006–2016)
  - Prime Minister – Andrus Ansip, Prime Minister of Estonia (2005–2014)
- European Union
  - President of the European Commission – José Manuel Barroso
  - President of the Parliament – Josep Borrell
  - President of the European Council –
    1. Jean-Claude Juncker (January–June)
    2. Tony Blair (July–December)
  - Presidency of the Council of the EU –
    1. Luxembourg (January–July)
    2. United Kingdom (July–December)
- Finland
  - President – Tarja Halonen, President of Finland (2000–2012)
  - Prime Minister – Matti Vanhanen, Prime Minister of Finland (2003–2010)
- France
  - President –
    1. Jacques Chirac, President of France (1995–2007)
    2. Nicolas Sarkozy, President of France (2007–2012)
  - Prime Minister –
    1. Dominique de Villepin, Prime Minister of France (2005–2007)
    2. François Fillon, Prime Minister of France (2007–2012)
- Georgia
  - President –
    1. Mikheil Saakashvili, President of Georgia (2004–2007)
    2. Nino Burjanadze, President of Georgia (2007–2008)
  - Prime Minister –
    1. Zurab Noghaideli, Prime Minister of Georgia (2005–2007)
    2. Giorgi Baramidze, Prime Minister of Georgia (2007)
    3. Lado Gurgenidze, Prime Minister of Georgia (2007–2008)
  - Abkhazia (unrecognised, secessionist state)
    - President – Sergei Bagapsh, President of Abkhazia (2005–2011)
    - Prime Minister –Alexander Ankvab, Prime Minister of Abkhazia (2005–2010)
  - South Ossetia (unrecognised, secessionist state)
    - President – Eduard Kokoity, President of South Ossetia (2001–2011)
    - Prime Minister – Yury Morozov, Prime Minister of South Ossetia (2005–2008)
- Germany
  - President – Horst Köhler, Federal President of Germany (2004–2010)
  - Chancellor – Angela Merkel, Federal Chancellor of Germany (2005–2021)
- Greece
  - President –
    1. Konstantinos Stephanopoulos, President of Greece (1995–2005)
    2. Karolos Papoulias, President of Greece (2005–2015)
  - Prime Minister – Kostas Karamanlis, Prime Minister of Greece (2004–2009)
- Hungary
  - President – László Sólyom, President of Hungary (2005–2010)
  - Prime Minister – Ferenc Gyurcsány, Prime Minister of Hungary (2004–2009)
- Iceland
  - President – Ólafur Ragnar Grímsson, President of Iceland (1996–2016)
  - Prime Minister – Geir Haarde, Prime Minister of Iceland (2006–2009)
- Ireland
  - President – Mary McAleese, President of Ireland (1997–2011)
  - Prime Minister – Bertie Ahern, Taoiseach of Ireland (1997–2008)
- Italy
  - President – Giorgio Napolitano, President of Italy (2006–2015)
  - Prime Minister – Romano Prodi, President of the Council of Ministers of Italy (2006–2008)
- Latvia
  - President –
    1. Vaira Vīķe-Freiberga, President of Latvia (1999–2007)
    2. Valdis Zatlers, President of Latvia (2007–2011)
  - Prime Minister –
    1. Aigars Kalvītis, Prime Minister of Latvia (2004–2007)
    2. Ivars Godmanis, Prime Minister of Latvia (2007–2009)
- Liechtenstein
  - Monarch – Hans-Adam II, Prince Regnant of Liechtenstein (1989–present)
  - Regent – Hereditary Prince Alois, Regent of Liechtenstein (2004–present)
  - Prime Minister – Otmar Hasler, Head of Government of Liechtenstein (2001–2009)
- Lithuania
  - President – Valdas Adamkus, President of Lithuania (2004–2009)
  - Prime Minister – Gediminas Kirkilas, Prime Minister of Lithuania (2006–2008)
- Luxembourg
  - Monarch – Henri, Grand Duke of Luxembourg (2000–2025)
  - Prime Minister – Jean-Claude Juncker, Prime Minister of Luxembourg (1995–2013)
- Republic of Macedonia
  - President – Branko Crvenkovski, President of the Republic of Macedonia (2004–2009)
  - Prime Minister – Nikola Gruevski, President of the Government of the Republic of Macedonia (2006–2016)
- Malta
  - President – Eddie Fenech Adami, President of Malta (2004–2009)
  - Prime Minister – Lawrence Gonzi, Prime Minister of Malta (2004–2013)
- Moldova
  - President – Vladimir Voronin, President of Moldova (2001–2009)
  - Prime Minister – Vasile Tarlev, Prime Minister of Moldova (2001–2008)
  - Transnistria (unrecognised, secessionist state)
    - President – Igor Smirnov, President of Transnistria (1990–2011) (Note: Transnistria only declared independence in 1991.)
- Monaco
  - Monarch –Albert II, Sovereign Prince of Monaco (2005–present)
  - Regent – Hereditary Prince Albert, Regent of Monaco (2005)
  - Prime Minister –Jean-Paul Proust, Minister of State of Monaco (2005–2010)
- Montenegro
  - President – Filip Vujanović, President of Montenegro (2006–2018)
  - Prime Minister – Željko Šturanović, Prime Minister of Montenegro (2006–2008)
- Kingdom of the Netherlands
  - Monarch – Beatrix, Queen of the Netherlands (1980–2013)
  - Netherlands (constituent country of the Kingdom of the Netherlands)
    - Prime Minister – Jan Peter Balkenende, Prime Minister of the Netherlands (2002–2010)
  - Netherlands Antilles (constituent country of the Kingdom of the Netherlands)
    - see § North America
  - Aruba (constituent country of the Kingdom of the Netherlands)
    - see § North America
- Norway
  - Monarch – Harald V, King of Norway (1991–present)
  - Prime Minister – Jens Stoltenberg, Prime Minister of Norway (2005–2013)
- Poland
  - President – Lech Kaczyński, President of Poland (2005–2010)
  - Prime Minister –
    1. Jarosław Kaczyński, Chairman of the Council of Ministers of Poland (2006–2007)
    2. Donald Tusk, Chairman of the Council of Ministers of Poland (2007–2014)
- Portugal
  - President – Aníbal Cavaco Silva, President of Portugal (2006–2016)
  - Prime Minister –José Sócrates, Prime Minister of Portugal (2005–2011)
- Romania
  - President – Traian Băsescu, President of Romania (2004–2014)
  - Prime Minister – Călin Popescu-Tăriceanu, Prime Minister of Romania (2004–2008)
- Russia
  - President – Vladimir Putin, President of Russia (1999–2008)
  - Prime Minister –
    1. Mikhail Fradkov, Chairman of the Government of Russia (2004–2007)
    2. Viktor Zubkov, Chairman of the Government of Russia (2007–2008)
- San Marino
  - Captains-Regent –
    1. Antonio Carattoni and Roberto Giorgetti, Captains Regent of San Marino (2006–2007)
    2. Alessandro Mancini and Alessandro Rossi, Captains Regent of San Marino (2007)
    3. Mirko Tomassoni and Alberto Selva, Captains Regent of San Marino (2007–2008)
- Serbia
  - President – Boris Tadić, President of Serbia (2006–2012)
  - Prime Minister – Vojislav Koštunica, Prime Minister of Serbia (2006–2008)
  - Kosovo (Self-Governing Entity under UN administration)
    - President – Fatmir Sejdiu, President of Kosovo (2006–2008)
    - Prime Minister – Agim Çeku, President of Kosovo (2006–2008)
    - UN Special Representative – Joachim Rücker, Special Representative of the UN Secretary-General for Kosovo (2006–2008)
- Slovakia
  - President – Ivan Gašparovič, President of Slovakia (2004–2014)
  - Prime Minister – Robert Fico, Prime Minister of Slovakia (2006–2010)
- Slovenia
  - President –
    1. Janez Drnovšek, President of Slovenia (2002–2007)
    2. Danilo Türk, President of Slovenia (2007–2012)
  - Prime Minister – Janez Janša, Prime Minister of Slovenia (2004–2008)
- Spain
  - Monarch – Juan Carlos I, King of Spain (1975–2014)
  - Prime Minister – José Luis Rodríguez Zapatero, President of the Government of Spain (2004–2011)
- Sweden
  - Monarch – Carl XVI Gustaf, King of Sweden (1973–present)
  - Prime Minister – Fredrik Reinfeldt, Prime Minister of Sweden (2006–2014)
- Switzerland
  - Council – Federal Council of Switzerland (Note: The seven-member Swiss Federal Council is head of state and government collectively. As a party to the Council, the president serves solely in a primus inter pares capacity for one year.)
    - Members – Moritz Leuenberger (1995–2010), Pascal Couchepin (1998–2009), Samuel Schmid (2001–2008), Micheline Calmy-Rey (2000–2008; President of Switzerland, 2007), Micheline Calmy-Rey (2002–2011), Christoph Blocher (2003–2007), and Hans-Rudolf Merz (2003–2010)
- Turkey
  - President –
    1. Ahmet Necdet Sezer, President of Turkey (2000–2007)
    2. Abdullah Gül, President of Turkey (2007–2014)
  - Prime Minister – Recep Tayyip Erdoğan, Prime Minister of Turkey (2003–2014)
- Ukraine
  - President – Viktor Yushchenko, President of Ukraine (2005–2010)
  - Prime Minister –
    1. Viktor Yanukovych, Prime Minister of Ukraine (2006–2007)
    2. Yulia Tymoshenko, Prime Minister of Ukraine (2007–2010)
- United Kingdom
  - Monarch – Elizabeth II, Queen of the United Kingdom (1952–present)
  - Prime Minister –
    1. Tony Blair, Prime Minister of the United Kingdom (1997–2007)
    2. Gordon Brown, Prime Minister of the United Kingdom (2007–2010)
  - Isle of Man (Crown dependency of the United Kingdom)
    - Lieutenant-Governor – Sir Paul Haddacks, Lieutenant Governor of the Isle of Man (2005–2011)
    - Chief Minister – Tony Brown, Chief Minister of the Isle of Man (2006–2011)
  - Guernsey (Crown dependency of the United Kingdom)
    - Lieutenant-Governor – Sir Fabian Malbon, Lieutenant Governor of Guernsey (2005–2011)
    - Chief Minister –
    1. Laurie Morgan, Chief Minister of Guernsey (2004–2007)
    2. Lyndon Trott, Chief Minister of Guernsey (2007–2008)
  - Jersey (Crown dependency of the United Kingdom)
    - Lieutenant-Governor – Sir Andrew Ridgway, Lieutenant Governor of Jersey (2006–2011)
    - Chief Minister – Frank Walker, Chief Minister of Jersey (2005–2008)
  - Gibraltar (Overseas Territory of the United Kingdom)
    - Governor – Sir Robert Fulton, Governor of Gibraltar (2006–2009)
    - Chief Minister – Peter Caruana, Chief Minister of Gibraltar (1996–2011)
- Vatican City
  - Monarch – Pope Benedict XVI, Sovereign of Vatican City (2005–2013)
  - Head of Government – Cardinal Giovanni Lajolo, President of the Governorate of Vatican City (2006–2011)
  - Holy See (sui generis subject of public international law)
    - Secretary of State – Cardinal Tarcisio Bertone, Cardinal Secretary of State (2006–2013)

== Events ==
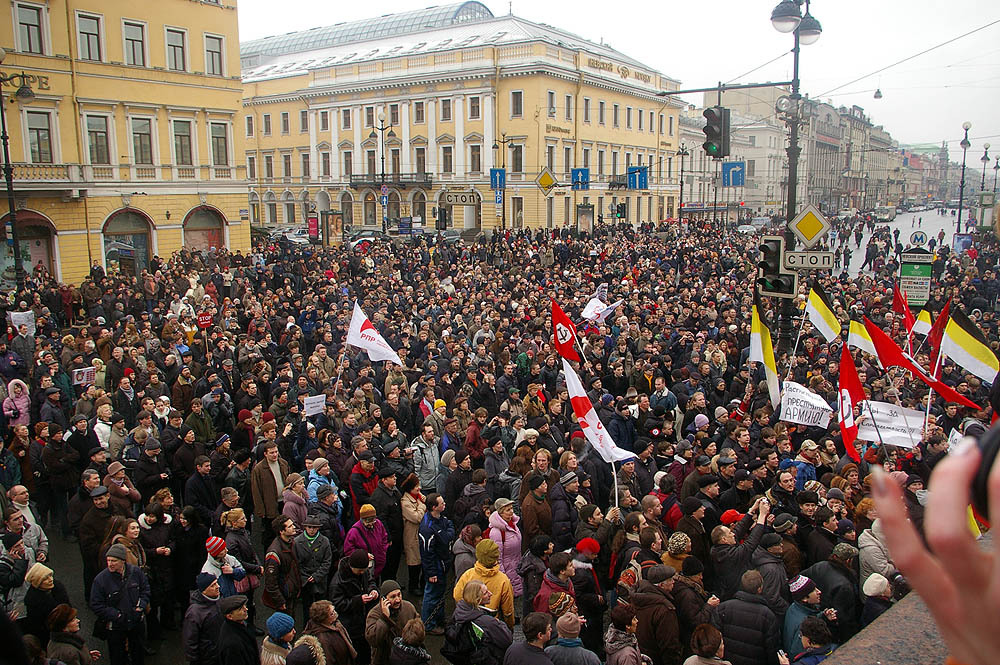
A Dissenters March rally in Saint Petersburg, Russia on March 3.

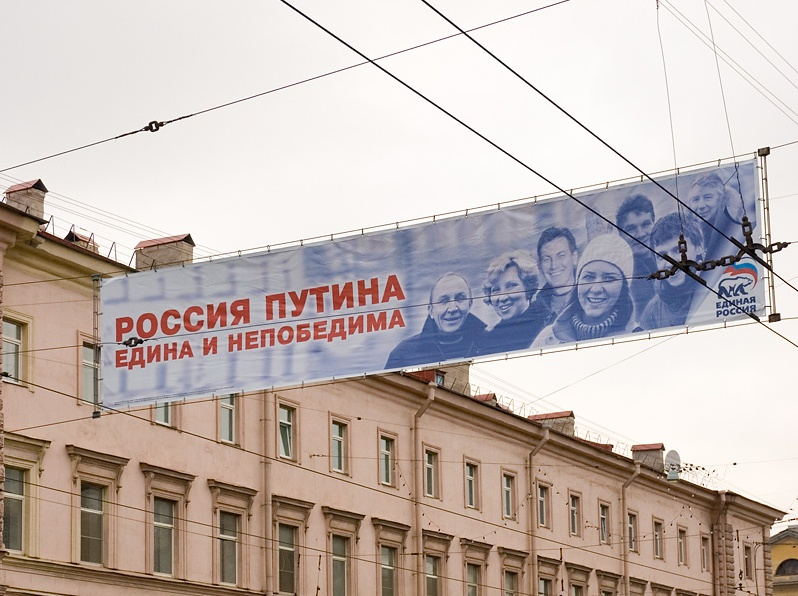
Advertisement for United Russia during the legislative election.

- January 1: Bulgaria and Romania joins in the European Union.
- January 3
  - Celebrity Big Brother 5 was launched on Channel 4, with celebrities such as Jermaine Jackson, Dirk Benedict and Leo Sayer.
  - National Express coach accident: A National Express coach from London Heathrow Airport to Aberdeen, Scotland crashed on a slip road between the M4 and the M25, killing two people and injuring thirty-six others.
- January 8: The Russia-Belarus energy dispute escalates.
- February 2: Orange Snow fell in Sibera, most likely caused by sandstorms in neighboring Kazakhstan.
- March 17: UTair Flight 471 ends with a hard landing, killing at least 6 people and injuring 20 others.
- March 19: The Ulyanovskaya Mine disaster, a methane explosion Kemerovo Oblast, killing at least 108 people.
- April: It is reported in Forbes magazine, an American publication, that Russia now has 60 billionaires, mostly living in Moscow, which is believed to have more millionaires than any other city in the world. 15 years ago, Russia did not even have any millionaires.
- April 27: A Mil Mi-8 helicopter crashes in Chechnya, killing all 20 federal troops aboard.
- July 10 – August 4: The Arktika 2007 expedition commences, which is the first crewed descent to the ocean bottom at the North Pole.
- Summer: The Dissenters March, which began in December 2006, continue throughout the summer.
- September 7: Russian personnel are ambushed in the Vedeno region of Chechnya.
- November 15: The Guerilla phase of the Second Chechen War continues.
- November 24: Anti-Putin Protests, led by former world chess champion Garry Kasparov, erupted in Saint Petersburg and Moscow.
- December 2: A Chechen constitutional referendum was held in Chechnya.
- December 2: The Legislative elections for seats in the State Duma resulted in a majority win by United Russia.

== Births ==
- 12 March – Xan Windsor, Lord Culloden, elder child of the Earl and Countess of Ulster
- 17 December – James (then Viscount Severn, now Earl of Wessex), son of Prince Edward and Sophie (then Earl and Countess of Wessex, now Duke and Duchess of Edinburgh)

== Deaths ==
=== January ===
- 3 January – Sir Cecil Walker, Ulster Unionist Member of Parliament for North Belfast (1983–2001) (born 1924)
- 4 January – Grenfell (Gren) Jones, newspaper cartoonist (born 1934)
- 7 January – Magnus Magnusson, journalist and broadcaster (Mastermind) (born 1929)
- 8 January
  - David Ervine, leader of the Progressive Unionist Party (born 1953)
  - Francis Cockfield, Baron Cockfield, politician and European Commissioner (born 1916)
- 27 January – Paul Channon, Baron Kelvedon, Member of Parliament (born 1935)
- 30 January – Griffith Jones, actor (born 1910)

=== February ===
- 9 February
  - Ian Richardson, actor (born 1934)
- 16 February – Sheridan Morley, theatre critic (born 1941)

=== March ===
- 4 March – Ian Wooldridge, sports journalist (born 1932)
- 7 March – Lady Thorneycroft, philanthropist (born 1914)
- 8 March – John Inman, actor (born 1935)
- 14 March
  - Tommy Cavanagh, former footballer and football manager (born 1928)
  - Gareth Hunt, actor (born 1942)
- 16 March
  - Sally Clark, lawyer and victim of a miscarriage of justice (born 1964)
  - Sir Arthur Marshall, aviation pioneer and businessman (born 1903)
- 17 March – Freddie Francis, cinematographer and film director (born 1917)
- 18 March – Bob Woolmer, cricketer and cricket coach (born 1948); died suddenly in Jamaica
- 28 March – Sir Thomas Hetherington, barrister (born 1926)
- 30 March
  - Fay Coyle, former footballer (born 1933)
  - Michael Dibdin, crime writer (born 1947)

=== April ===
- April 23 – Boris Yeltsin, 1st President of Russia (1991 to 1999)
- 24 April – Alan Ball, former footballer and football manager (born 1945)

=== June ===
- 18 June – Bernard Manning, comedian (born 1930)

=== July ===
- 5 July – George Melly, jazz singer (born 1926)
- 29 July
  - Phil Drabble, author and television presenter (born 1914)
  - Mike Reid, comedian and actor (born 1940)
- 31 July – R. D. Wingfield, novelist and radio dramatist (born 1928)

=== August ===
- 10 August – Tony Wilson, broadcaster, nightclub manager, and record label owner (born 1950)
- 25 August – Ray Jones, footballer (born 1988)

=== September ===
- 10 September – Anita Roddick, environmentalist, political campaigner, businesswoman (The Body Shop) (born 1942)
- 11 September – Ian Porterfield, footballer and football manager (born 1946)
- 15 September – Colin McRae, rally driver (born 1968)

=== October ===
- 1 October – Ronnie Hazlehurst, composer (born 1928)
- 16 October – Deborah Kerr, actress (born 1921)
- 18 October – Alan Coren, columnist (born 1938)

=== November ===
- 6 November – Hilda Braid, British actress (born 1929)
- 22 November – Verity Lambert, British television producer (born 1935)
- 28 November – Tony Holland, British television producer and writer (born 1940)

=== December ===
- 1 December – Anton Rodgers, British actor (born 1933)
- 29 December
  - Phil O'Donnell, British footballer (born 1972); died while playing
  - Kevin Greening, British radio presenter (born 1962)

== See also ==
- 2007 in the European Union
- List of state leaders in 2007 § Europe
