= 2002 in Europe =

This is a list of 2002 events that occurred in Europe.

== Incumbents ==
- Albania
  - President –
    1. Rexhep Meidani, President of Albania (1997–2002)
    2. Alfred Moisiu, President of Albania (2002–2007)
  - Prime Minister –
    1. Ilir Meta, Prime Minister of Albania (1999–2002)
    2. Pandeli Majko, Prime Minister of Albania (2002)
    3. Fatos Nano, Prime Minister of Albania (2002–2005)
- Andorra
  - Monarchs –
    - French Co-Prince – Jacques Chirac, French Co-prince of Andorra (1995–2007)
      - Co-Prince's Representative – Philippe Massoni (2002–2007)
    - Episcopal Co-Prince – Joan Martí i Alanis, Episcopal Co-prince of Andorra (1970–2003)
      - Co-Prince's Representative – Nemesi Marqués Oste (1993–2012)
  - Prime Minister – Marc Forné Molné, Head of Government of Andorra (1994–2005)
- Armenia
  - President – Robert Kocharyan, President of Armenia (1998–2008)
  - Prime Minister – Andranik Margaryan, Prime Minister of Armenia (2000–2007)
- Austria
  - President – Thomas Klestil, Federal President of Austria (1992–2004)
  - Chancellor – Wolfgang Schüssel, Federal Chancellor of Austria (2000–2007)
- Azerbaijan
  - President – Heydar Aliyev, President of Azerbaijan (1993–2003)
  - Prime Minister – Artur Rasizade, Prime Minister of Azerbaijan (1996–2003)
  - Nagorno-Karabakh (unrecognised, secessionist state)
    - President – Arkadi Ghukasyan, President of Nagorno-Karabakh (1997–2007)
    - Prime Minister – Anushavan Danielyan, Prime Minister of Nagorno-Karabakh (1999–2007)
- Belarus
  - President – Alexander Lukashenko, President of Belarus (1994–present)
  - Prime Minister – Gennady Novitsky, Prime Minister of Belarus (2001–2004)
- Belgium
  - Monarch – Albert II, King of the Belgians (1993–2013)
  - Prime Minister – Guy Verhofstadt, Prime Minister of Belgium (1999–2008)
- Bosnia and Herzegovina
  - Head of State – Presidency of Bosnia and Herzegovina
    - Serb Member – Jozo Križanović (2001–2002; Chairman of the Presidency of Bosnia and Herzegovina, 2004–2005)
    - Bosniak Member – Sulejman Tihić (2002–2006; Chairman of the Presidency of Bosnia and Herzegovina, 2004)
    - Croat Member – Dragan Čović (2002–2005, Chairman of the Presidency of Bosnia and Herzegovina, 2003–2004)
  - Prime Minister –
    1. Zlatko Lagumdžija, Chairman of the Council of Ministers of Bosnia and Herzegovina (2001–2002)
    2. Dragan Mikerević, Chairman of the Council of Ministers of Bosnia and Herzegovina (2001–2002)
    3. Adnan Terzić, Chairman of the Council of Ministers of Bosnia and Herzegovina (2002–2007)
  - High Representative – Lord (Paddy) Ashdown, High Representative for Bosnia and Herzegovina (2002–2006)
- Bulgaria
  - President –
    1. Petar Stoyanov, President of Bulgaria (1997–2002)
    2. Georgi Parvanov, President of Bulgaria (2002–2012)
  - Prime Minister – Simeon Saxe-Coburg-Gotha, Prime Minister of Bulgaria (2001–2005)
- Croatia
  - President – Stjepan Mesić, President of Croatia (2000–2010)
  - Prime Minister – Ivica Račan, Prime Minister of Croatia (2000–2003)
- Cyprus
  - President – Glafcos Clerides, President of Cyprus (1993–2003)
  - Northern Cyprus (unrecognised, secessionist state)
    - President – Rauf Denktaş, President of Northern Cyprus (1976–2005)
    - Prime Minister – Derviş Eroğlu, Prime Minister of Northern Cyprus (1996–2004)
- Czech Republic
  - President – Václav Havel, President of the Czech Republic (1993–2003)
  - Prime Minister –
    1. Miloš Zeman, Prime Minister of the Czech Republic (1998–2002)
    2. Vladimír Špidla, Prime Minister of the Czech Republic (2002–2004)
- Denmark
  - Monarch – Margrethe II, Queen of Denmark (1972–2024)
  - Prime Minister – Anders Fogh Rasmussen, Prime Minister of Denmark (2001–2009)
- Estonia
  - President – Arnold Rüütel, President of Estonia (2001–2006)
  - Prime Minister –
    1. Mart Laar, Prime Minister of Estonia (1999–2002)
    2. Siim Kallas, Prime Minister of Estonia (2002–2004)
- European Union
  - European Union
- President of the European Commission: Romano Prodi (1999–2004)
- President of the Parliament:
  - Nicole Fontaine (until 16 January)
  - Pat Cox (starting 16 January)
- President of the European Council:
  - Jose Maria Aznar (January–June)
  - Anders Fogh Rasmussen (July–December)
- Presidency of the Council of the EU:
  - Spain (January–July)
  - Denmark (July–December)
- Finland
  - President – Tarja Halonen, President of Finland (2000–2012)
  - Prime Minister – Paavo Lipponen, Prime Minister of Finland (1995–2003)
- France
  - President – Jacques Chirac, President of France (1995–2007)
  - Prime Minister –
    1. Lionel Jospin, Prime Minister of France (1997–2002)
    2. Jean-Pierre Raffarin, Prime Minister of France (2002–2005)
- Georgia
  - President – Eduard Shevardnadze, Acting President of Georgia (1995–2003)
  - Abkhazia (unrecognised, secessionist state)
    - President – Vladislav Ardzinba, President of Abkhazia (1990–2005) (Note: Abkhazia only declared independence in 1992.)
    - Prime Minister –
      1. Anri Jergenia, Prime Minister of Abkhazia (2001–2002)
      2. Gennadi Gagulia, Prime Minister of Abkhazia (2002–2003)
  - South Ossetia (unrecognised, secessionist state)
    - President – Eduard Kokoity, President of South Ossetia (2001–2011)
    - Prime Minister – Gerasim Khugayev, Prime Minister of South Ossetia (2001–2003)
- Germany
  - President – Johannes Rau, Federal President of Germany (1999–2004)
  - Chancellor – Gerhard Schröder, Federal Chancellor of Germany (1998–2005)
- Greece
  - President – Konstantinos Stephanopoulos, President of Greece (1995–2005)
  - Prime Minister – Costas Simitis, Prime Minister of Greece (1996–2004)
- Hungary
  - President – Ferenc Mádl, President of Hungary (2000–2005)
  - Prime Minister –
    1. Viktor Orban, Prime Minister of Hungary (1998–2002)
    2. Péter Medgyessy, Prime Minister of Hungary (2002–2004)
- Iceland
  - President – Ólafur Ragnar Grímsson, President of Iceland (1996–2016)
  - Prime Minister – Davíð Oddsson, Prime Minister of Iceland (1991–2004)
- Ireland
  - President – Mary McAleese, President of Ireland (1997–2011)
  - Prime Minister – Bertie Ahern, Taoiseach of Ireland (1997–2008)
- Italy
  - President – Carlo Azeglio Ciampi, President of Italy (1999–2006)
  - Prime Minister – Silvio Berlusconi, President of the Council of Ministers of Italy (2001–2006)
- Latvia
  - President – Vaira Vīķe-Freiberga, President of Latvia (1999–2007)
  - Prime Minister –
    1. Andris Bērziņš, Prime Minister of Latvia (2000–2002)
    2. Einars Repše, Prime Minister of Latvia (2002–2004)
- Liechtenstein
  - Monarch – Hans-Adam II, Prince Regnant of Liechtenstein (1989–present)
  - Prime Minister – Otmar Hasler, Head of Government of Liechtenstein (2001–2009)
- Lithuania
  - President – Valdas Adamkus, President of Lithuania (1998–2003)
  - Prime Minister – Algirdas Brazauskas, Prime Minister of Lithuania (2001–2006)
- Luxembourg
  - Monarch – Henri, Grand Duke of Luxembourg (2000–present)
  - Prime Minister – Jean-Claude Juncker, Prime Minister of Luxembourg (1995–2013)
- Macedonia
  - President – Boris Trajkovski, President of Macedonia (1999–2004)
  - Prime Minister –
    1. Ljubčo Georgievski, President of the Government of Macedonia (1998–2002)
    2. Branko Crvenkovski, President of the Government of Macedonia (2002–2004)
- Malta
  - President – Guido de Marco, President of Malta (1999–2004)
  - Prime Minister – Eddie Fenech Adami, Prime Minister of Malta (1998–2004)
- Moldova
  - President – Vladimir Voronin, President of Moldova (2001–2009)
  - Prime Minister – Vasile Tarlev, Prime Minister of Moldova (2001–2008)
  - Transnistria (unrecognised, secessionist state)
    - President – Igor Smirnov, President of Transnistria (1990–2011) (Note: Transnistria only declared independence in 1991.)
- Monaco
  - Monarch – Rainier III, Sovereign Prince of Monaco (1949–2005)
  - Prime Minister – Patrick Leclercq, Minister of State of Monaco (2000–2005)
- Kingdom of the Netherlands
  - Monarch – Beatrix, Queen of the Netherlands (1980–2013)
  - Netherlands (constituent country of the Kingdom of the Netherlands)
    - Prime Minister –
    1. Wim Kok, Prime Minister of the Netherlands (1994–2002)
    2. Jan Peter Balkenende, Prime Minister of the Netherlands (2002–2010)
  - Netherlands Antilles (constituent country of the Kingdom of the Netherlands)
    - see § North America
  - Aruba (constituent country of the Kingdom of the Netherlands)
    - see § North America
- Norway
  - Monarch – Harald V, King of Norway (1991–present)
  - Prime Minister – Kjell Magne Bondevik, Prime Minister of Norway (2001–2005)
- Poland
  - President – Aleksander Kwaśniewski, President of Poland (1995–2005)
  - Prime Minister – Leszek Miller, Chairman of the Council of Ministers of Poland (2001–2004)
- Portugal
  - President – Jorge Sampaio, President of Portugal (1996–2006)
  - Prime Minister –
    1. Antonio Guterres, Prime Minister of Portugal (1995–2002)
    2. José Manuel Barroso, Prime Minister of Portugal (2002–2004)
- Romania
  - President – Ion Iliescu, President of Romania (2000–2004)
  - Prime Minister –
    1. Adrian Năstase, Prime Minister of Romania (2000–2004)
- Russia
  - President – Vladimir Putin, President of Russia (1999–2008)
  - Prime Minister –
    1. Mikhail Kasyanov, Chairman of the Government of Russia (2000–2004)
- San Marino
  - Kosovo (Self-Governing Entity under UN administration)
    - President – Ibrahim Rugova, President of Kosovo (2002–2006)
    - Prime Minister – Bajram Rexhepi, Prime Minister of Kosovo (2002–2004)
    - UN Special Representative –
      1. Charles H. Brayshaw, Acting Special Representative of the UN Secretary-General for Kosovo (2002)
      2. Michael Steiner, Special Representative of the UN Secretary-General for Kosovo (2002–2003)
- Slovakia
  - President – Rudolf Schuster, President of Slovakia (1999–2004)
  - Prime Minister – Mikuláš Dzurinda, Prime Minister of Slovakia (1998–2006)
- Slovenia
  - President –
    1. Milan Kučan, President of Slovenia (1991–2002)
    2. Janez Drnovšek, President of Slovenia (2002–2007)
  - Prime Minister –
    1. Janez Drnovšek, Prime Minister of Slovenia (2000–2002)
    2. Anton Rop, Prime Minister of Slovenia (2002–2004)
- Spain
  - Monarch – Juan Carlos I, King of Spain (1975–2014)
  - Prime Minister – José María Aznar, President of the Government of Spain (1996–2004)
- Sweden
  - Monarch – Carl XVI Gustaf, King of Sweden (1973–present)
  - Prime Minister – Göran Persson, Prime Minister of Sweden (1996–2006)
- Switzerland
  - Council – Federal Council of Switzerland (Note: The seven-member Swiss Federal Council is head of state and government collectively. As a party to the Council, the president serves solely in a primus inter pares capacity for one year.)
    - Members – Moritz Leuenberger (1995–2010), Pascal Couchepin (1998–2009), Joseph Deiss (1999–2006; President of Switzerland, 2004), Samuel Schmid (2000–2008), Micheline Calmy-Rey (2002–2011), Ruth Metzler (1999–2003), and Kaspar Villiger (1989–2003)
- Turkey
  - President – Ahmet Necdet Sezer, President of Turkey (2000–2007)
  - Prime Minister –
    1. Bülent Ecevit, Prime Minister of Turkey (1999–2002)
    2. Abdullah Gül, Prime Minister of Turkey (2002–2003)
- Ukraine
  - President – Leonid Kuchma, President of Ukraine (1994–2005)
  - Prime Minister –
    1. Anatoliy Kinakh, Prime Minister of Ukraine (2001–2002)
    2. Viktor Yanukovych, Prime Minister of Ukraine (2002–2005)
- United Kingdom
  - Monarch – Elizabeth II, Queen of the United Kingdom (1952–2022)
  - Prime Minister – Tony Blair, Prime Minister of the United Kingdom (1997–2007)
  - Isle of Man (Crown dependency of the United Kingdom)
    - Lieutenant-Governor – Ian Macfadyen, Lieutenant Governor of the Isle of Man (2000–2005)
    - Chief Minister – Richard Corkill, Chief Minister of the Isle of Man (2001–2004)
  - Guernsey (Crown dependency of the United Kingdom)
    - Lieutenant-Governor – Sir John Foley, Lieutenant Governor of Guernsey (2000–2005)
    - Bailiff – Sir de Vic Carey, Bailiff of Guernsey (1999–2005)
  - Jersey (Crown dependency of the United Kingdom)
    - Lieutenant-Governor – Sir John Cheshire, Lieutenant Governor of Jersey (2001–2006)
    - Bailiff – Sir Philip Bailhache, Bailiff of Jersey (1995–2009)
  - Gibraltar (Overseas Territory of the United Kingdom)
    - Governor – Sir David Durie, Governor of Gibraltar (2000–2003)
    - Chief Minister – Peter Caruana, Chief Minister of Gibraltar (1996–2011)
- Vatican City
  - Monarch – Pope John Paul II, Sovereign of Vatican City (1978–2005)
  - Head of Government – Cardinal Edmund Szoka, President of the Governorate of Vatican City (1997–2006)
  - Holy See (sui generis subject of public international law)
    - Secretary of State – Cardinal Angelo Sodano, Cardinal Secretary of State (1990–2006)
- Yugoslavia
  - President – Svetozar Marović, President of Yugoslavia (2000–2003)
  - Prime Minister – Dragiša Pešić, Prime Minister of Yugoslavia (2001–2003)

== Events ==
- 21 April – first round of the presidential election: Jacques Chirac and Jean-Marie le Pen poll the most votes. This was a major political event, both nationally and internationally, as it was the first time someone like Le Pen with such far-right views had qualified for the second round of a French presidential election. Two weeks of demonstrations against the National Front follow.
- 5 May – second round of the presidential election. Jacques Chirac returns for a second term as President of the French Republic.

=== November ===
- The European Christian Political Party (ECPP), a European political party is founded in Lakitelek, Hungary.

== Deaths ==
=== January ===
- Rolando Del Bello, Italian tennis player (b. 1925)
- Astrid Sampe, Swedish textile designer (b. 1909)
- Armi Aavikko, Finnish beauty queen and singer (b. 1958)
- Ian Grist, British Conservative politician (b. 1938)

=== March ===
- John Challens, British scientist and civil servant, helped develop Britain's first atomic bomb (b. 1915)

== See also ==
- 2002 in the European Union
- List of state leaders in 2002 § Europe
