= Oleg Yesayan =

Armenian politician and diplomat

- Օլեգ Եսայան
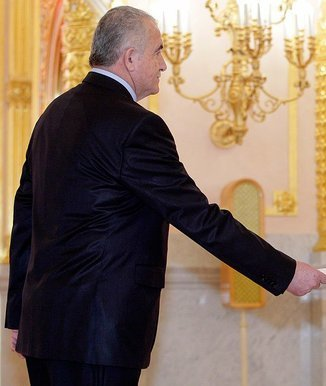
- Yesayan in 2022

Prime Minister of Nagorno-Karabakh
- In office 8 January 1992 – August 1992
- President: Artur Mkrtchian (Acting); Georgy Petrosyan (Acting)
- Preceded by: position established
- Succeeded by: Robert Kocharyan

President of the National Assembly of Nagorno-Karabakh
- In office 2 December 1997 – 1 July 2005
- President: Arkadi Ghukasyan
- Preceded by: Arthur Tovmasian
- Succeeded by: Ashot Ghulian

Chairman of the Securities Commission of Armenia
- In office 2005–2006
- President: Serzh Sargsyan

Personal details
- Born: 12 November 1946 Sos, Nagorno-Karabakh, Azerbaijan SSR, Soviet Union
- Party: Independent
- Education: Yerevan State University
- Occupation: Economist

Oleg Yesayan (Armenian: Օլեգ Եսայան; born 12 November 1946) is an Armenian politician and diplomat who is a former Prime Minister of Nagorno-Karabakh, President of the National Assembly of Nagorno-Karabakh, and Chairman of the Securities Commission of Armenia. Yesayan is also a former ambassador of Armenia to Russia and Belarus, presenting his credentials to Russian president Dmitry Medvedev on 5 February 2010.

Political offices
| Preceded by N/A | Prime Minister of Nagorno-Karabakh; 1992–1992 | Succeeded by Robert Kocharian |
