= Party of Economic Revival =

Political party in Crimea, Ukraine

Party of Economic Revival (Ukrainian: Партія економічного відродження, romanized: Partiia ekonomichnoho vidrodzhennia) was a political party in Ukraine set up by former communists in Crimea in November 1992 as Party of Economic Revival of Crimea. It was suspected of having ties with organized crime. The party was dissolved by the Ukrainian Ministry of Justice in 2003.

== History ==
During the Ukrainian parliamentary election 1994 the party was represented in the Verkhovna Rada after winning 1 consistency seat. In 1994 the party became part of coalition backing the Council of Ministers of Crimea (Crimean government).

During the Ukrainian parliamentary election 1998 the party was part of the Electoral bloc NEP with the Democratic Party of Ukraine, the combination won 1,22% of the national vote. The Democratic Party of Ukraine won 1 (single-mandate constituency) seat, the Party of Economic Revival did not win any seats.

The party did not participate in the Ukrainian parliamentary election 2002. It was dissolved by the Ukrainian Ministry of Justice in 2003.

Party member Anushavan Danielyan, a vice-speaker of the Supreme Council of Crimea in the 1990s, was appointed Prime Minister of the Nagorno-Karabakh Republic in 1999.
