= Poghos Poghosyan =

Armenian murder victim (b. 1958, d. 2001)

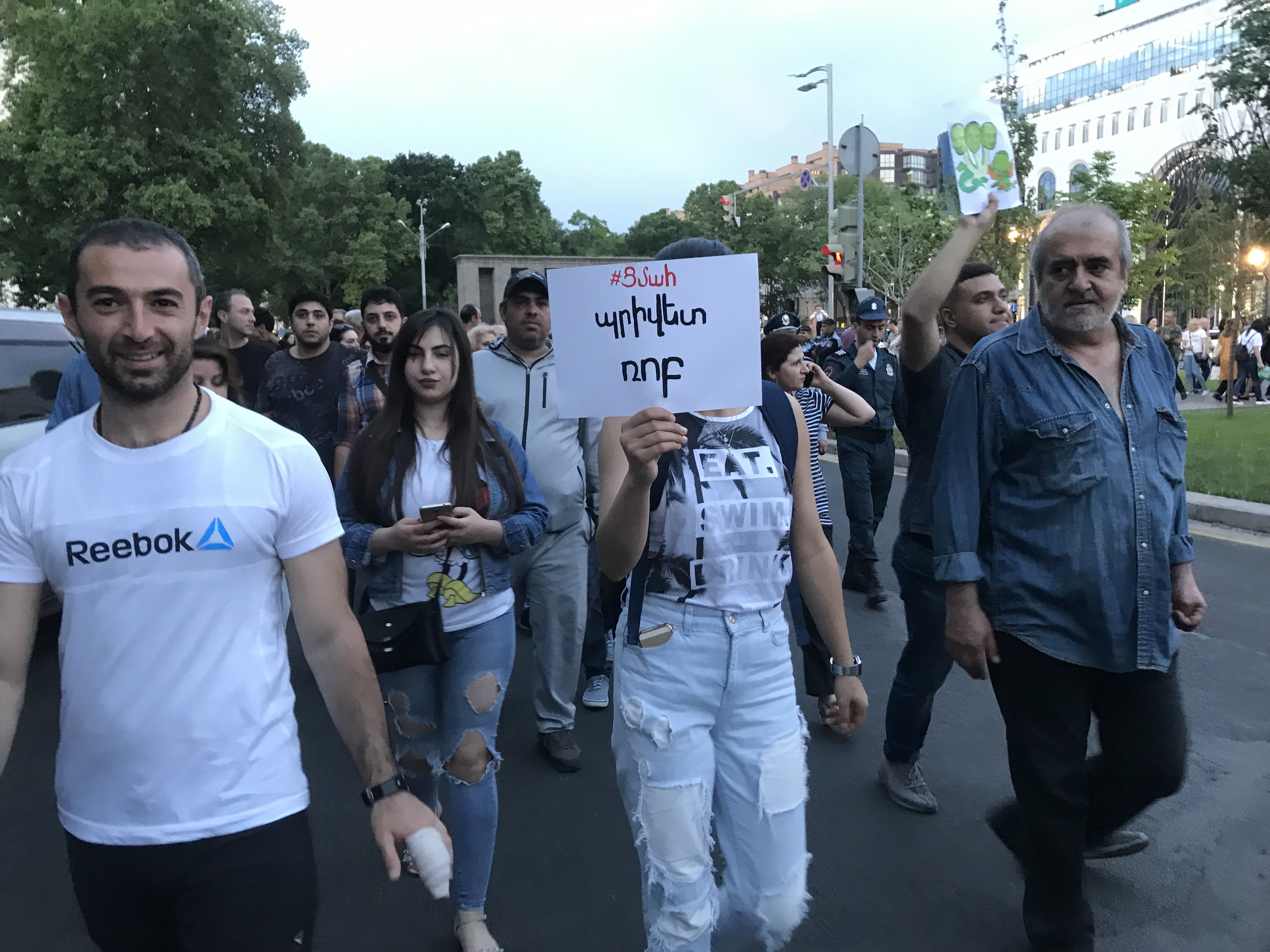
Protest against the order of the court of general jurisdiction of Yerevan to free Robert Kocharyan on bail from pre-trial detention. The poster shows the inscription «Life imprisonment. Privet, Rob». May 19, 2019, Yerevan.

Poghos Poghosyan (Armenian: Պողոս Պողոսյան; 1958 – September 25, 2001) was an ethnic Armenian from the Javakheti region of Georgia. He was killed at Poplavok cafe in Yerevan on September 25, 2001, by the bodyguards of then President of Armenia Robert Kocharyan. Kocharyan's bodyguards pleaded not guilty to the accusations.

While at the cafe, a seated Poghosyan saw Kocharyan (a former classmate) leaving the cafe with Charles Aznavour and greeted him by saying "Hi Rob" (պրիվետ Ռոբ, privet Rob) as they left. This very casual greeting was taken as an insult by the president, and his bodyguards approached Poghosyan's table and asked to have a word with him. He was taken to the toilet where he was beaten and declared dead 10 minutes later by an ambulance paramedic.

It took days for the media to report on this murder by the president's bodyguard, witnessed by hundreds of people. Human Rights Watch said that witnesses feared coming forward during the trial. The trial was quick, with one of President Kocharyan's bodyguards, Aghamal Harutiunyan, also known as Kuku, charged with involuntary manslaughter. He was sentenced with a year of probation.

After the 2018 Armenian revolution this case was eventually reopened, with testimony by witness Steven Newton, which was not allowed in the original trial. Re-trial arguments are scheduled to be heard beginning February 27, 2020.

In January 2020, prosecutors asked the Court of Appeals to overturn Aghamal Harutiunyan's guilty verdict and order a retrial. They said there was additional proof that the death was a murder committed by "a group of individuals." On July 6, 2020, the court accepted the request of prosecutors and the case was sent back to Yerevan's court of first instance.
