= Trial of former Republic of Artsakh leaders =

2025–2026 court case in Azerbaijan

- Court: Baku Judicial Complex, Baku
- Started: 17 January 2025
- Decided: 5 February 2026

Court membership
- Judges sitting: Zeynal Ağayev (presiding); Camal Ramazanov; Anar Rzayev; Günel Samedova (alternate)

The trial of several former members of the military-political leadership of the breakaway Republic of Artsakh, as well as some Artsakhi servicemen and civilians, began on 17 January 2025, in the Baku Military Court. The hearings were being held in the cases of 16 people, including former presidents Arkadi Ghukasyan, Bako Sahakyan, Arayik Harutyunyan and former acting president Davit Ishkhanyan.

The individuals were arrested after Azerbaijan regained control over the entire territory of Nagorno-Karabakh in September 2023 following a military offensive. While attempting to flee to Armenia during Azerbaijan's expulsion of Nagorno-Karabakh Armenians, several of the leaders were arrested and detained by authorities at the military checkpoint on the Lachin corridor. The defendants were charged under more than 20 articles of the Criminal Code of Azerbaijan, including "waging an aggressive war," "extermination of the population," and "violent seizure of power" in Nagorno-Karabakh. The case of former State Minister Ruben Vardanyan, who is accused of "financing terrorism," creating "illegal armed groups," and "illegally crossing the border of Azerbaijan," was separated into distinct legal proceedings.

The court hearings were held behind closed doors in a purpose-built courtroom with information disseminated only by the Azerbaijani state-run news agency AZERTAC. International observers and foreign media were denied access to the hearings. Due to the closed nature of the trial, it is not possible to verify many details of the trial. The defendants were represented exclusively by Azerbaijani lawyers.

Human rights groups, European political institutions, others have criticized the fairness of the trial, warning of potential human rights violations and that the defendants could be subjected to torture in custody. The trial itself has been characterized as politically motivated.

On 5 February 2026, the court sentenced the defendants, finding them all guilty. Arayik Harutyunyan, David Babayan, Davit Ishkhanyan, Levon Mnatsakanyan, and David Manukyan were sentenced to life imprisonment.

== Background ==
Azerbaijan, Armenia, the former Nagorno-Karabakh Autonomous Oblast (brown) and adjacent territories of seven districts of Azerbaijan, controlled after the First Karabakh War and until the fall of 2020 by the unrecognized NKR (yellow)

The conflict over Nagorno-Karabakh, an internationally recognized territory of Azerbaijan with an Armenian majority, has long roots. Motivated by fears of cultural and physical erasure under government policies from Azerbaijan, in 1988 the Armenians of Nagorno-Karabakh launched a mass movement for reunification (Miatsum) with Armenia. In 1991, the region of Nagorno-Karabakh unilaterally declared independence from Azerbaijan in a referendum, becoming the first Soviet republic to achieve de facto independence. This was met with Operation Ring and other extreme violence from Azerbaijani authorities, escalating tensions, and culminating in the First Nagorno-Karabakh War.

In September 2020, a new war broke out in the region, known as the Second Nagorno-Karabakh War, ending with a declared ceasefire and Azerbaijan establishing control over part of Nagorno-Karabakh and seven adjacent districts. A Russian peacekeeping contingent was deployed in Nagorno-Karabakh and the Lachin Corridor, which links Nagorno-Karabakh with Armenia. During the war, among other things, Armenian forces launched rocket and artillery strikes on residential areas of Ganja. On 4 October, Artsakhi President Arayik Harutyunyan stated that the city was shelled on his orders in response to the shelling of Stepanakert. Shelling of Stepanakert by the Azerbaijani side was also confirmed by Russian and international observers (see Stepanakert bombing). On the same day, the Prosecutor General's Office of Azerbaijan opened a criminal case against Harutyunyan under 15 articles of the Criminal Code of Azerbaijan (planning, preparation, initiation or waging of an aggressive war, premeditated murder, terrorism and the creation of a criminal community).

On 19 September 2023, after a 10-month-long blockade of Nagorno-Karabakh Azerbaijan launched a military offensive in the region. A day later, the leadership of Nagorno-Karabakh surrendered by signing a ceasefire agreement on Azerbaijan's terms. Local Armenian forces in Nagorno-Karabakh then surrendered weapons and military equipment, and the majority of the population fled to Armenia, and the President of Artsakh, Samvel Shahramanyan, signed a decree which formally dissolved the republic from 1 January 2024.

A number of international organizations and experts characterize Azerbaijan's blockade and expulsion of Armenians from Nagorno-Karabakh as ethnic cleansing (Note: Attributed to these sources:) or genocide. (Note: Attributed to these sources:) These sources include scholars, (Note: Attributed to these sources:) journalists, (Note: Attributed to these sources:) legal experts, (Note: Attributed to these sources:) former UN experts, (Note: Attributed to these sources:) governments, (Note: Attributed to these sources:) and others. (Note: Attributed to these sources:) (Note: Attributed to these sources:) (Note: Attributed to these sources:)

== Arrests of suspects ==
Azerbaijan's installation of the military checkpoint on the Lachin corridor in 2023 intensified fears of arbitrary arrest after Azerbaijani authorities said it would allow them to detain around 400 wanted Armenians, without making the list public. Combined with Azerbaijan's prior record of arbitrary actions, this lack of transparency left the Armenian residents of Nagorno-Karabakh — especially men of certain ages — feeling that anyone could become a target. Olesya Vartanyan, International Crisis Group’s senior analyst for the South Caucasus wrote that "Arrests with linkages to the past wars, local army or the [Karabakh] government …would quality almost all local men for detentions."

=== Arrests of former Artsakhi leaders ===
After the Azerbaijani authorities allowed those wishing to leave Nagorno-Karabakh for Armenia, to leave the region, isolated cases of detention of the leaders of the military-political leadership of Artsakh began to occur. Thus, on 27 September 2023, at the Lachin border checkpoint, while moving from Nagorno-Karabakh in the direction of Armenia, the State Border Service of Azerbaijan detained Vardanyan, who was soon taken to Baku. The next day, the State Security Service of Azerbaijan reported that he was charged under three articles of the Criminal Code of Azerbaijan, including financing terrorism, creating illegal armed groups, and illegally crossing the border. The Sabail Court in Baku chose a preventive measure in the form of imprisonment for four months for Vardanyan.

On 28 September, former Foreign Minister and advisor to President Samvel Shahramanyan, David Babayan, surrendered to Azerbaijani authorities. According to Babayan, he had been blacklisted by Azerbaijan, and the Azerbaijani side demanded his arrival in Baku for an investigation. Babayan stated that his failure to appear or his escape would cause serious harm to the Armenian people, and therefore decided to leave Stepanakert for the Azerbaijani-controlled city of Shusha.

On 29 September, the State Security Service of Azerbaijan detained former Deputy Commander of the NKR Army David Manukyan, accusing him of "terrorist crimes", as well as "illegal possession of firearms and ammunition", "acquisition, storage and transportation of parts, ammunition, explosives and equipment", "creation of armed formations and groups not provided for by law" and "illegal crossing of the border of the Republic of Azerbaijan". On the same day, at the Lachin checkpoint, while attempting to enter the Armenian city of Goris from Nagorno-Karabakh, Azerbaijani security forces detained former Artsakhi Defense Minister Levon Mnatsakanyan.

On 2 October, former presidents of the unrecognized republic Arkadi Ghukasyan and Bako Sahakyan, who held this post from 1997 to 2007 and from 2007 to 2020, respectively, as well as the speaker of the National Assembly, David Ishkhanyan, were arrested. They were charged with terrorism, illegal acquisition, transfer, sale, storage, transportation or carrying of weapons and the creation of armed formations not provided for by law. The following day, it was announced that Arayik Harutyunyan, who was the president of Artsakh from 2020 to 2023, was arrested. In addition to the above-mentioned articles, he is accused of planning, preparing, unleashing and waging war, violating international humanitarian law, giving criminal orders during an armed conflict, premeditated murder, etc. On 5 October, the Sabail District Court ordered the arrest of Ghukasyan, Sahakyan and Ishkhanyan for four months.

In response to a request from Ruben Vardanyan's legal counsel, the United Nations Human Rights Council’s Working Group on Arbitrary Detention (UNWGAD), at its 101st session held in November 2024, adopted an opinion that Vardanyan’s detention was not arbitrary and did not violate international law on the grounds of discrimination. The impartiality of the UNWGAD was challenged by former ICC prosecutor Luis Moreno Ocampo, who asserted that Ganna Yudkivska, the Chair-Rapporteur of the Working Group, had "professional, financial, and family ties with Azerbaijan," including links to a law firm representing the Azerbaijani state oil company, which he described as "gross contraventions of UN rules" that compromised the body’s neutrality Similar concerns were raised by former UN official Hasmik Egian.

== Defendants ==
Name	Image	Position	Outcome
Arayik Harutyunyan		President of Artsakh (2020–2023)	Life imprisonment
Ruben Vardanyan		State Minister of Artsakh (2022–2023)	20 years
Arkadi Ghukasyan		Minister of Foreign Affairs (1993–1997) and President of Artsakh (1997–2007)	20 years
Bako Sahakyan		President of Artsakh (2007–2020)	20 years
Davit Ishkhanyan		Chairman of the National Assembly and Acting President of Artsakh in 2023 (2023)	Life imprisonment
David Manukyan		First Deputy Commander of the Artsakh Defense Army	Life imprisonment
David Babayan		Minister of Foreign Affairs (2021–2023)	Life imprisonment
Levon Mnatsakanyan		Minister of Defense (2015–2018)	Life imprisonment
Vasily Beglaryan			15 years
Erik Gazaryan			15 years
Davit Allahverdyan			16 years
Gurgen Stepanyan		Served his military service in Hadrut from 2005 to 2007, and was transferred to a combat post in 2023.	15 years
Levon Balayan		Former serviceman of the Artsakh Defense Army, participant in the Second Nagorno-Karabakh War	16 years
Madat Babayan		Participant in the First Nagorno-Karabakh War	19 years
Garik Martirosyan		Participant in the First and Second Nagorno-Karabakh War	18 years
Melikset Pashayan		Participant in the First and Second Nagorno-Karabakh War	19 years

== The International Red Cross and its relations with the outside world ==
Detainees communicated with the outside world through the International Red Cross (ICRC), which served as the only channel of communication. With its special mandate as an independent and neutral organization, the ICRC played a crucial role in establishing contact between detainees and their families. Thus, in March 2025, the organization transmitted a message from Ruben Vardanyan, which evoked widespread sympathy for his plight. As Rasmus Canbäck suggests, this message, along with previously transmitted ones, apparently angered the Azerbaijani government, which, irritated by the organization's neutrality, subsequently revoked the ICRC's accreditation in the country. Several organizations operating under the auspices of the UN were also expelled from the country. At the same time, Azerbaijan has expressed a desire to delegate some of the ICRC's tasks to its own Red Crescent Society, despite the fact that the Red Cross's parent organization initiated an internal investigation after an OCCRP investigation linked the Azerbaijan Red Crescent to the Aliyev regime. Thus, as Canbäck notes, Azerbaijan wishes to provide political prisoners with communication through its own channels, which, according to him, would be seen as a ploy to deceive the international community. A source within the International Red Cross suggested that the Azerbaijani Red Crescent likely does not have the mandate to perform the functions of the Red Cross in maintaining communication between prisoners and their families. The ICRC's press service also stated that it has no information on whether any alternative channels of communication with the families of detainees will be established.

== Trial ==
The court hearings were held behind closed doors in a purpose-built courtroom disseminated only by the Azerbaijani state-run news agency AZERTAC. International observers and foreign media were denied access to the hearings. The defendants were represented exclusively by Azerbaijani lawyers. Due to the closed nature of the trial, it is not possible to verify the details of the trial.

The defendants comprised 16 people, with 15 of them being tried together and Vardanyan tried separately. Vardanyan's request that he be tried alongside the others was denied. All of the defendants voluntarily surrendered to Azerbaijani authorities and denied their guilt.

=== January ===
At the 27 January court hearing, motions by several defendants' defense attorneys to change their pretrial detention to house arrest were denied. Vardanyan's defense attorney, in turn, once again, as at the previous hearing, requested additional time (30 days) to review the criminal case. However, the prosecutor recalled that at the previous hearing, a motion for an additional 10 days had been granted, which is sufficient to fully review the criminal case. Ultimately, the court denied Vardanyan's request.

=== February ===
On 18 February, Vardanyan declared a hunger strike in protest of violations in his case. Vardanyan called the trial a "political show," noting that he was being tried in a military tribunal, not a civilian court. He also stated that he did not have full access to the case materials—he was required to review 422 volumes in Azerbaijani in just 21 working days, with some materials classified as state secrets. He also claimed that his lawyer had limited access to the case, was subjected to psychological pressure, and was prohibited from calling defense witnesses or filing complaints about violations during the trial.

=== November ===
At the 13 November court hearing, the prosecution requested life sentences for five former leaders: Arayik Harutyunyan, David Ishkhanyan, David Babayan, Levon Mnatsakanyan, and David Manukyan. For Arkady Ghukasyan, Bako Sahakyan, and Madat Babayan, prosecutors requested 20-year sentences, with the first ten years to be served in prison and the remainder in a maximum-security penal facility, as they had reached the age of 65 by the end of the trial and cannot legally be sentenced to life imprisonment. They requested a 19-year sentence for Garik Martirosyan in a maximum-security penal colony, 18 years for David Allahverdyan, and 17 years for Levon Balayan, also with the first ten years to be served in prison. For Vasily Beglaryan, Gurgen Stepanyan and Erik Kazaryan – 16 years of strict regime with the same condition.

== Verdict ==
On 5 February 2026, the court delivered a verdict against the defendants, finding them all guilty. Arayik Harutyunyan, David Babayan, David Ishkhanyan, Levon Mnatsakanyan, and David Manukyan were sentenced to life imprisonment.

In January 2026, the Azerbaijani government sources told the Azerbaijani Press Agency that there was "no possibility" of releasing the former Nagorno-Karabakh leadership.

== Reactions ==
Human rights groups, European political institutions, others have criticized the fairness of the trial, warning of human rights violations and that the defendants could be subjected to torture in custody. The trial itself has been characterized as politically motivated or a show trial. The European Parliament called for sanctions against the Azerbaijani prosecutors and judges involved in the trial: Jamal Ramazanov, Anar Rzayev, and Zeynal Agayev.

International law expert Siranush Sahakyan says that the court's sentences were predictable and "a prosecution of those who implemented Artsakh's right to self-determination." Laurence Broers, an expert in the geopolitics of the Caucasus, stated that "this is much more about the regime legitimacy and putting the whole [Nagorno-Karabakh Republic] project on trial," adding that "it's very much about public humiliation." Historian Michael Rubin described Azerbaijan's charges as "preposterous and the trials even more so." Him and others sources have and compared the detention and trials of the former leaders of Nagorno-Karabakh to the early phase of the Armenian Genocide in which Armenian leaders were arrested, tried, and deported by Ottoman authorities. Former UN official Juan E. Méndez says Azerbaijan’s detention of Nagorno-Karabakh leaders on vague ‘terrorism’ charges—without evidence or independent monitoring—is an ‘attack on the leadership of a community at risk' and, combined with 'the mass deportation of the totality of its members', is ‘indicative of genocide'.

In February 2025, the European Parliament condemned the "unjust detention" of Armenian hostages, including former de facto Nagorno-Karabakh officials, describing the proceedings as "sham trials and systematic violations of the fundamental rights" of detainees. It cited lack of access to independent counsel and interpreters, secret hearings, inhumane treatment including through banned psychoactive methods.

Amnesty International described the trial as a "nothing short of a travesty," adding that it was "based on 'evidence' in a language they [the defendants] could not understand and that was not adequately translated." The U.S. state department has stated that in the Azerbaijani justice system "judges [are] not functionally independent of the executive branch," adding that "Credible reports indicated that judges and prosecutors took instructions from the presidential administration and the Justice Ministry, particularly in politically sensitive cases."

Former International Criminal Court prosecutor Luis Moreno Ocampo stated: "These Stalin-era show trials in modern Azerbaijan are not merely a domestic charade but a calculated attempt to distract from [Azerbaijani President] Aliyev’s crimes and tighten his grip on power."

The Lemkin Institute stated that President Aliyev’s comparison of Armenian defendants to Nazi leaders is a false, dangerous, and genocidal form of rhetoric that denies or reverses Azerbaijan’s own alleged crimes against Armenians in Nagorno-Karabakh, and helps legitimize ongoing abuse. The institute stated that "The only 'crime' committed by the Armenian representatives of the former Artsakh government..is that they exercised their right to self-determination and sought to protect the Armenian residents of the enclave – whose presence dates back four thousand years – from Azerbaijani aggression."
