= Zhirayr Poghosyan =

- Ժիրայր Պողոսյան

Prime Minister of Nagorno-Karabakh
- In office 15 June 1998 – 30 June 1999
- President: Arkadi Ghukasyan
- Preceded by: Leonard Petrosyan
- Succeeded by: Anushavan Danielyan

Personal details
- Born: 15 January 1942 (age 84) Martuni, Nagorno-Karabakh, Azerbaijan SSR, Soviet Union
- Party: Independent
- Education: Polytechnic Institute in Yerevan

Zhirayr Tevanovich Poghosyan (Armenian: Ժիրայր Պողոսյան; born 15 January 1942) is an Armenian politician who was Prime Minister of Nagorno-Karabakh from 15 June 1998 to 30 June 1999.

He studied in Stepanakert and from 1960 to 1965 attended the Polytechnic Institute in Yerevan. After graduation and until 1969, he served as technician, engineer, senior engineer and designer at the Scientific Research Institute. From 1969 to 1971, he was a leading designer at the Scientific Research Institute of Microelectronics. In 1971 he moved to the Electric Engineering Institute where he stayed until 1990, becoming a team leader, deputy head of department, head of department, deputy director for research projects, and senior scientific researcher.

Being active in politics, starting 1992, he was chief specialist of Special Affairs of Armenia and then 1992 acting Deputy Prime Minister of Nagorno-Karabakh Republic.

In June 1998, he replaced Leonard Petrosyan as Prime Minister of Nagorno-Karabakh Republic serving until 24 June 1999, when he was succeeded by Anushavan Danielyan.

He is married and has two children.

Political offices
Preceded by Leonard Petrosyan	Prime Minister of Nagorno-Karabakh; 1998–1999	Succeeded by Anushavan Danielyan
