= Arayik Harutyunyan =

President of Artsakh from 2020 to 2023

- Արայիկ Հարությունյան
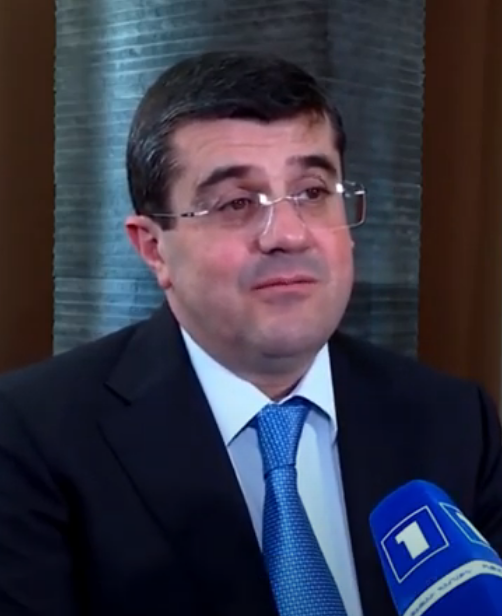
- Harutyunyan in 2020

4th President of Artsakh
- In office 21 May 2020 – 1 September 2023
- Prime Minister: Grigory Martirosyan; Artak Beglaryan; Ruben Vardanyan; Gurgen Nersisyan; Samvel Shahramanyan
- Preceded by: Bako Sahakyan
- Succeeded by: Davit Ishkhanyan (acting); Samvel Shahramanyan

1st State Minister of Artsakh
- In office 25 September 2017 – 6 June 2018
- President: Bako Sahakyan
- Preceded by: Office created
- Succeeded by: Grigory Martirosyan

6th Prime Minister of the Nagorno-Karabakh Republic
- In office 14 September 2007 – 25 September 2017
- President: Bako Sahakyan
- Preceded by: Anushavan Danielyan
- Succeeded by: Office abolished

Personal details
- Born: 14 December 1973 (age 52) Stepanakert, Nagorno-Karabakh Autonomous Oblast, Azerbaijan SSR, Soviet Union (now Khankendi, Azerbaijan)
- Party: Free Motherland
- Spouse: Kristina Harutyunyan
- Children: 3
- Relatives: Artur Harutyunyan
- Education: Yerevan State Institute of Economy; Artsakh University

Military service
- Allegiance: Republic of Artsakh
- Branch/service: Artsakh Defense Army
- Years of service: 1992–1994
- Battles/wars: First Nagorno-Karabakh War

Arayik Vladimiri Harutyunyan (Armenian: Արայիկ Վլադիմիրի Հարությունյան; born 14 December 1973) is an Armenian politician who served as the fourth president of the Republic of Artsakh from May 2020 to September 2023. Under his predecessor Bako Sahakyan, he served as the sixth and last Prime Minister from 2007 until the abolishment of that position in 2017 and as the first State Minister of the Republic of Artsakh from 2017 until his resignation in 2018. Harutyunyan led Artsakh through the 2020 Nagorno-Karabakh War with Azerbaijan, during which the republic lost most of the territory under its control. He resigned on 1 September 2023 in the midst of the Azerbaijani blockade of Nagorno-Karabakh.

On 3 October 2023, he and two other former presidents of Artsakh, Arkadi Ghukasyan and Bako Sahakyan, together with former president of the National Assembly Davit Ishkhanyan, were detained by the State Security Service of Azerbaijan and brought to Baku.

== Early life ==
Harutyunyan was born in 1973 in Stepanakert, then capital of the Nagorno-Karabakh Autonomous Oblast, part of the Azerbaijani SSR in the Soviet Union. He became a student at the Yerevan State Institute of Economy in 1990. Two years later, in 1992, he joined the armed forces of the Nagorno-Karabakh Republic (the Republic of Artsakh) and took part in the First Nagorno-Karabakh War. His older brother, Samvel, died in combat during the war. After the war, he transferred from the Yerevan State Institute of Economy to the Artsakh State University Faculty of Economics and graduated in 1995. Three years later, in 1998, he completed his post-graduate studies at Artsakh State University.

== Career ==
Harutyunyan started his career at the Ministry of Finance and Economy of Artsakh in 1994, serving as assistant to the minister. In 1997, he left the ministry and started his career in the private sector, in Armagrobank, working there until 2004.

=== In the National Assembly ===
In 2005, Harutyunyan co-founded the Free Motherland party, which took part in the 2005 parliamentary election, winning 10 out of 33 seats in the National Assembly of Artsakh. He also served as the Chairman of the Free Motherland party and its parliamentary grouping in the National Assembly. Harutyunyan headed the Commission on Financial, Budget and Economy Management in the National Assembly.

=== Premiership ===
In 2007, he was appointed prime minister by then-president Bako Sahakyan. His first speech as prime minister was full of promises to revive the economy, democracy and social justice in the unrecognised country. The urgent steps that he promised to take included "fighting against corruption, protectionism, the clan system and social evils". After the 2017 constitutional referendum, Artsakh transitioned from a semi-presidential system to a presidential system of governance and the office of prime minister was abolished. Harutyunyan remained in the Sahakyan government and was appointed to the newly created office of state minister. He resigned from the position in June 2018 after four days of protests in Stepanakert sparked by the beating of two civilians by Artsakh's security forces.

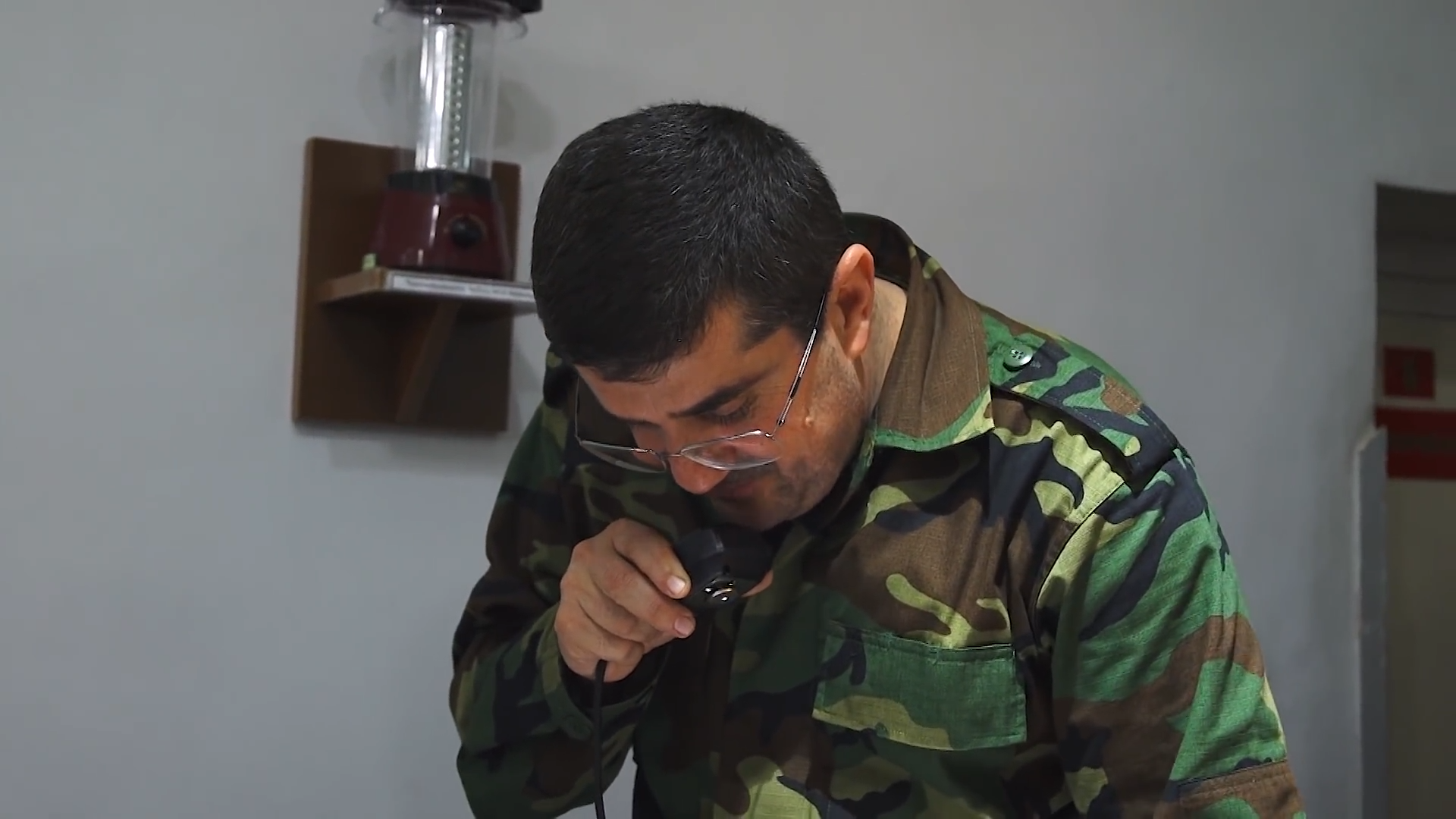
President Harutyunyan announces the names of the Heroes of Artsakh during Second Nagorno-Karabakh War

=== Presidency ===
Harutyunyan participated in and won the 2020 Artsakhian general election, thereby becoming the fourth President of Artsakh. He received 49.3% of the votes in the first round of voting and won in the second round after his closest competitor Masis Mayilyan pulled out of the race, citing the dangers of the COVID-19 pandemic in the Republic of Artsakh. Harutyunyan's Free Motherland party won 16 of 33 seats in Artsakh's National Assembly. He was inaugurated on 21 May in a ceremony that was attended by his opponent Masis Mayilyan and Armenian prime minister Nikol Pashinyan. During the ceremony, which was held in Shusha instead of Stepanakert (a decision which angered the authorities in Baku), he described Artsakh and Armenia as "inseparable parts of a united national homeland". During the first week of his presidency, he signed two highly publicized executive orders: the first one changed the seat of the National Assembly of Artsakh from Stepanakert to Shusha, while the second made all tertiary education in Artsakh free. On 19 September, he announced that the National Assembly will be moved from the capital to Shusha by 2022, in time for the 30th anniversary of the Armenian capture of Shusha.

==== 2020 conflict ====
During the 2020 Nagorno-Karabakh conflict, the Ministry of Defence of Azerbaijan claimed that the Azerbaijani Army had severely wounded Harutyunyan, who had visited the front that morning. These allegations were denied by both Harutyunyan and his government. On 23 October, Harutyunyan published an open letter to Russian President Vladimir Putin penned by himself, calling for Russian support to Artsakh, noting Russia's historical ties to the region and the many notable Russian and Soviet figures from Karabakh.

On 27 October, he dismissed Jalal Harutyunyan from the post of minister of defence after he was wounded in fighting. It came a week after he promoted him to the rank of lieutenant general. A day later, Harutyunyan granted Jalal Harutyunyan the title Hero of Artsakh.

On 9 November, Harutyunyan gave his consent for Nikol Pashinyan to sign the 2020 Nagorno-Karabakh ceasefire agreement between Armenia, Azerbaijan and Russia. Harutyunyan defended the decision to accept the ceasefire agreement, stating that the Armenian side "would have lost all of Artsakh" if the war had not been stopped.

==== Aftermath of 2020 Nagorno-Karabakh War ====
On 11 November, Harutyunyan called on citizens of Artsakh to refrain from participating in the protests in Yerevan, calling on them to return home and declaring that "Artsakh will remain Armenian". Two later, he received General Rustam Muradov, then commander of the Russian peacekeeping forces in Nagorno-Karabakh, who arrived in Stepanakert to begin the peacekeeping mission in the region.

On 1 December 2020, Harutyunyan announced that a national unity government would be formed and a number of cabinet officials would be replaced, pending snap elections. He announced his intention to leave politics permanently and that he would not run in the coming elections. On 16 December, Harutyunyan announced that all security-related decisions would have to be approved by the Security Council of Artsakh, giving significant powers to the council's head Vitaly Balasanyan. In February 2021, Harutyunyan's spokesperson confirmed that Harutyunyan, Russian general Rustam Muradov and an Azerbaijani official had met to discuss "humanitarian issues".

In April 2022, Armenian prime minister Nikol Pashinyan gave a speech stating the international community was urging Armenia to "lower [its] bar a bit on the question of Nagorno-Karabakh’s status," suggesting that Armenia will recognize Azerbaijan's territorial integrity. Harutyunyan and other Artsakh officials reacted to the speech, declaring that the Armenians of Artsakh would not give up their right to self-determination and that it was "impossible" and "inadmissible" for Artsakh to come under Azerbaijani control.

On 4 November 2022, Harutyunyan appointed Ruben Vardanyan, a Russian Armenian billionaire who had recently moved to Artsakh, to the position of state minister with "broad powers". Vardanyan then carried out a cabinet reshuffle, also dismissing Vitaly Balasanyan from the position of security council chief. The appointment angered the Azerbaijani authorities; President Ilham Aliyev declared in November 2022 that Azerbaijan would not negotiate with Vardanyan. In December 2022, Azerbaijan began a blockade of Nagorno-Karabakh by blocking the Lachin corridor, the sole road linking Artsakh to Armenia and the rest of the world, precipitating shortages of essential supplies such as food, medicine and fuel. Vardanyan’s dismissal was one of the key demands made by Azerbaijan for it to end the blockade of Artsakh. Reports emerged in early 2023 of a "rift" between Harutyunyan and Vardanyan. Harutyunyan dismissed Vardanyan from the position on 23 February 2023. Harutyunyan did not give details about the reasons for the dismissal, but claimed that it was in Artsakh's best interests and denied that it was in response to Azerbaijan's demands for Vardanyan's departure.

On 13 February 2023, Harutyunyan proposed a constitutional amendment that would allow Artsakh's parliament to elect an interim president in case of the president's resignation, raising new expectations of his impending resignation. The changes were approved by Artsakh's parliament in March 2023. On 25 July, with the humanitarian situation in Artsakh continually deteriorating because of the Azerbaijani blockade, Harutyunyan declared Artsakh a "disaster zone," calling for an international response to ensure the safety of the inhabitants of the region. He stated that he had contacted UN agencies and sent letters to the presidents of the co-chair countries of the OSCE Minsk Group (France, Russia and the United States) describing the situation and demanding action to address the crisis. He called on Russia to carry out its obligations according to the 2020 ceasefire agreement and asked the Armenian government not to recognize Artsakh as a part of Azerbaijan.

==== Resignation ====
On 29 August 2023, Harutyunyan stated that he was considering resigning and going to serve in Artsakh's militia. On 31 August, Harutyunyan announced his resignation as president of the Republic of Artsakh along with State Minister Gurgen Nersisyan. He formally submitted his resignation to Artsakh's parliament on 1 September. In a statement on Facebook, he suggested that his remaining in the position may pose an obstacle to negotiations between Artsakh and Azerbaijan. He also stated that the defeat in the 2020 war and subsequent events had "significantly reduced the trust [among the inhabitants of Artsakh] in the authorities, especially the President," which was limiting the effectiveness of the government. On 9 September 2023, Artsakh's parliament elected Samvel Shahramanyan to replace Harutyunyan.

== Arrest ==
On 3 October 2023, in the aftermath of Azerbaijan's offensive in Nagorno-Karabakh, Harutyunyan and two other former presidents of Artsakh, Arkadi Ghukasyan and Bako Sahakyan, together with former president of the National Assembly Davit Ishkhanyan, were detained by the State Security Service of Azerbaijan and brought to Baku. Previously on 1 October, an arrest warrant had been issued for him by Azerbaijani Prosecutor-General Kamran Aliyev, for Harutyunyan's role in ordering the 2020 Ganja missile attacks.

On 17 January 2025 Harutyunyan and 15 other Armenian officials went on trial for terrorism, crimes against humanity and crimes against the state of Azerbaijan. On 5 February 2026, Harutyunyan was sentenced to life imprisonment.

== Honours and awards ==
- (Republic of Artsakh) Medal "For the Liberation of Shushi" (8 May 2003)
- (Republic of Artsakh) Order of the Combat Cross, second degree
- (Republic of Artsakh) Order of Grigor Lusavorich (30 August 2016)

Political offices
Preceded by Anushavan Danielyan	Prime Minister of Artsakh; 2007–2017	Office abolished
New office	State Minister of Artsakh; 2017–2018	Succeeded by Grigory Martirosyan
Preceded by Bako Sahakyan	President of Artsakh; 2020–2023	Succeeded by Samvel Shahramanyan
