= Leonard Petrosyan =

Armenian politician (1952-1999)

- Լեոնարդ Պետրոսյան
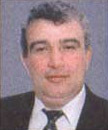

President of the Nagorno-Karabakh Republic (Acting)
- In office 20 March 1997 – 8 September 1997
- Preceded by: Robert Kocharyan
- Succeeded by: Arkadi Ghukasyan

Prime Minister the Nagorno-Karabakh Republic
- In office December 1994 – June 1998
- Preceded by: Robert Kocharyan
- Succeeded by: Zhirayr Poghosyan

President of the National Assembly of Nagorno-Karabakh
- In office 12 September 1991 – 8 January 1992
- Preceded by: position established
- Succeeded by: Artur Mkrtchyan

Deputy Prime Minister of Armenia
- In office 1998 – 27 October 1999

Deputy Defence Minister of Armenia

Personal details
- Born: 11 October 1952 Martuni, Nagorno-Karabakh, Azerbaijan SSR, Soviet Union
- Died: 27 October 1999 (aged 47) Yerevan, Armenia
- Cause of death: Assassination by firearm
- Party: Independent
- Education: Yerevan Institute of National Economy

Leonard Petrosyan (Armenian: Լեոնարդ Պետրոսյան; 11 October 1952 – 27 October 1999) was an Armenian politician who was the acting President of the Nagorno-Karabakh Republic from 20 March 1997 to 8 September 1997. He also served as Prime Minister of the Nagorno-Karabakh Republic from December 1994 to June 1998. He was killed in the 1999 Armenian parliament shooting while serving as Deputy Prime Minister of Armenia.

== Life ==
Leonard Petrosyan was born in Martuni, Nagorno-Karabakh, Azerbaijan SSR, where he attended the local primary as well as secondary school from 1958 to 1970. After serving briefly in the ranks of the Soviet Army from 1971 to 1973, he studied at the Yerevan Cooperation Institute in 1973 and later at the Yerevan Institute of National Economy in 1974. After graduating as an economist in 1979, he continued working in the system of common nutrition in an agricultural center run by the Martuni regional community of the Communist Party, a position he held since 1975 and kept until 1988.

In 1988, he was appointed Deputy, then Chairman of the Agro-Industrial Committee and participated in the Karabakh movement. Petrosyan became the President of the National Assembly of Nagorno-Karabakh, a regional council, on 12 September 1991. He left the position on 8 January 1992 and became the first deputy head of the department of special programs of Armenia. In December 1994, he was chosen as the Prime Minister of the Nagorno-Karabakh Republic under the presidency of Robert Kocharyan, the first President of the Nagorno-Karabakh Republic. After serving for three years as Prime Minister until June 1998, Petrosyan took over the Presidency of the Nagorno-Karabakh Republic from Kocharyan on 20 March 1997, when the latter was appointed as Prime Minister of Armenia. He continued to serve as president of the Nagorno-Karabakh Republic for almost 5 1/2 months until 8 September 1997, at the same time keeping his Prime Minister position, when Arkadi Ghukasyan was elected as third president by popular vote.

== Death ==
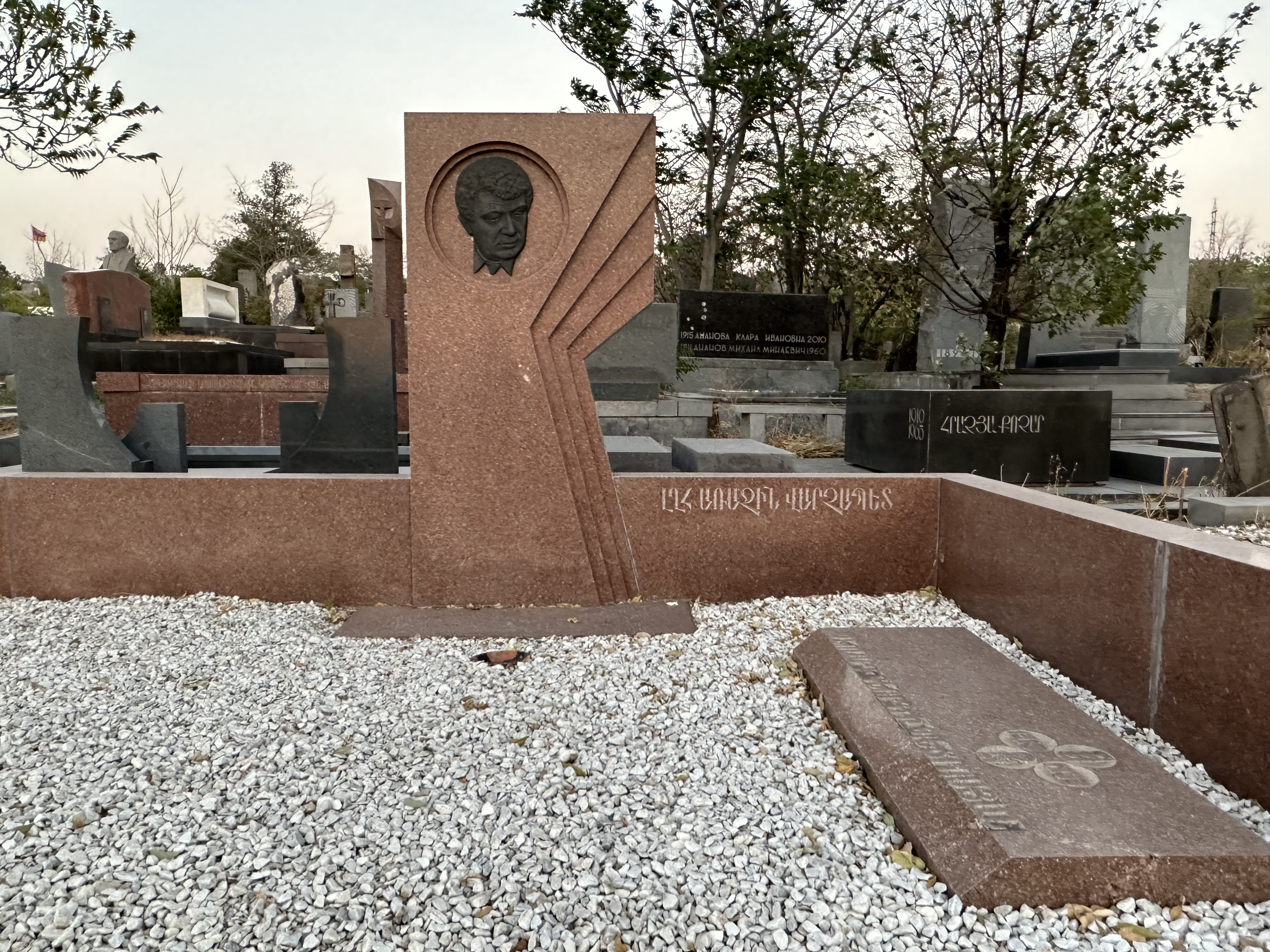
Leonard Petrosyan’s grave in Tokhmakh Cemetery in Yerevan

Petrosyan then moved to Yerevan, Armenia and was appointed the Deputy Defence Minister of Armenia, and in 1998 became the Deputy Prime Minister of Armenia. He was killed in the 1999 Armenian parliament shooting among other Armenian politicians in the hall of the Armenian National Assembly.

== Personal life ==
He was married and the father of four children.

== Awards ==
- (Armenia) Order of the Combat Cross, 1st degree (1999)

Political offices
Preceded by Robert Kocharyan	Prime Minister of the Nagorno-Karabakh Republic; 1994–1998	Succeeded by Zhirayr Poghosyan
Preceded by Robert Kocharyan	President of the Nagorno-Karabakh Republic; 1997	Succeeded by Arkadi Ghukasyan
