= 2007 Siberian orange snow =

Phenomenon

The Siberian orange snow of 2007 was an anomalous phenomenon that occurred in early February 2007. Beginning on 31 January 2007, an orange-tinted snow fell across an area of 1,500 square kilometres (580 sq mi) in Omsk Oblast, Siberian Federal District, Russia, approximately 2,300 km (1,400 mi) from Moscow, as well as into the neighboring Tomsk and Tyumen Oblasts. It was unclear what caused the orange snow. Speculation ranged from pollutants to a sandstorm in neighboring Kazakhstan.

== Description ==
The orange snow was malodorous, oily to the touch, and reported to contain four times the normal level of iron. Though mostly orange, some of the snow was red or yellow. It affected an area with about 27,000 residents. It was originally speculated that it was caused by industrial pollution, a rocket launch or even a nuclear accident. It was later determined that the snow was non-toxic; however, people in the region were advised not to use the snow or allow animals to feed upon it. Colored snow is uncommon in Russia but not unheard of, as there have been many cases of black, blue, green and red snowfall.

== Possible causes ==
This orange snow may have been caused by a heavy sandstorm in neighboring Kazakhstan. Tests on the snow revealed numerous sand and clay dust particles, which were blown into Russia in the upper stratosphere. The speculation that the coloration was caused by a rocket launch from Baikonur in Kazakhstan was later dismissed, as the last launch before the event took place on 18 January 2007.

Russia's environmental watchdog originally claimed that the colored snowfall was caused by industrial pollution, such as "waste from metallurgical plants." It stated that the snow contained four times the normal quantities of acids, nitrates, and iron. However, it would be nearly impossible to pinpoint a culprit if pollution were the cause, as there are various industries nearby, such as the city of Omsk, which is a center of the oil industry in Russia.
