= Davit Ishkhanyan =

Acting President of Artsakh during 2023

- Դավիթ Իշխանյան

Acting President of Artsakh
- In office 1 September 2023 – 9 September 2023
- Prime Minister: Samvel Shahramanyan
- Preceded by: Arayik Harutyunyan
- Succeeded by: Samvel Shahramanyan

President of the National Assembly of Artsakh
- In office 7 August 2023 – 31 December 2023
- President: Arayik Harutyunyan; Himself (acting); Samvel Shahramanyan
- Preceded by: Arthur Tovmasyan
- Succeeded by: Ashot Danielyan

Personal details
- Born: 27 December 1968 (age 57) Ashan, Nagorno-Karabakh Autonomous Oblast, Soviet Union
- Party: Armenian Revolutionary Federation
- Education: Artsakh University

Military service
- Branch/service: Soviet Army; Artsakh Defence Army
- Years of service: 1987–1989; 1989–1995

Davit Rubeni Ishkhanyan (Armenian: Դավիթ Ռուբենի Իշխանյան; 27 December 1968) is an Armenian politician. A member of the Armenian Revolutionary Federation, he was the President of the National Assembly of the breakaway state Republic of Artsakh from August to October 2023. He briefly served as acting President of Artsakh in September 2023.

== Political career ==
On 7 August 2023, Ishkhanyan was elected President of the National Assembly. Pursuant to Artsakh constitution article 98, he also became acting president within three days following the September 1 resignation of President Arayik Harutyunyan, holding it up until the 2023 Artsakhian presidential election. Samvel Shahramanyan would succeed Ishkhanyan in that post.

On 3 October 2023, he and three former presidents of Artsakh, Arkadi Ghukasyan, Bako Sahakyan and Arayik Harutyunyan, were detained by the State Security Service of Azerbaijan and brought to Baku. On 5 February 2026, an Azerbaijan military court sentenced Ishkhanyan to life imprisonment on charges such as "waging an aggressive war," "violent seizure of power", etc.
