= President of the National Assembly of Artsakh =

Speaker of the parliamentary body

President of the National Assembly of the Republic of Artsakh
- Արցախի հանրապետության Ազգային ժողովի նախագահ (Armenian)
- Coat of arms of Artsakh
- Incumbent; Gagik Baghunts (acting) since 2 July 2026
- Appointer: Elected by National Assembly
- Term length: coincides with the term of the assembly
- Inaugural holder: Leonard Petrosyan
- Formation: September 12, 1991
- Website: http://nankr.am

The president of the National Assembly of the Republic of Artsakh (Armenian: Ազգային ժողովի նախագահ, Azgayin zhoghovi naxagah) is the speaker of the House in the Parliament of Artsakh.

Until 1995, the post was called Chairman of the Supreme Council of the Nagorno-Karabakh Republic. From January 1992 to December 1994, until Robert Kocharyan was elected as the president of Artsakh, the chairman was de facto the head of state of the republic.

Following an Azerbaijani offensive on 19 September 2023, Artsakh agreed to dissolve itself by 1 January 2024, as de jure. In December 2023, this decision was subsequently declared not valid by the Artsakh president.

On May 21 2025, Ashot Danielyan was elected President of the National Assembly, assuming the duties of Acting President of the government-in-exile of the Republic of Artsakh.

However, on July 2, 2026, Danielyan resigned from office, citing external pressure and attacks. Following his departure, Deputy Speaker Gagik Baghunts assumed leadership of the parliament as Acting Speaker, while the elected office remained vacant..

== List of presidents of the National Assembly ==
Image	Name	Took office	Left office	Political party
	Leonard Petrosyan	12 September 1991	8 January 1992	Independent
	Artur Mkrtchyan	8 January 1992	14 April 1992	Independent
	Georgi Petrosian (acting)	15 April 1992	14 June 1993	Independent
	Karen Baburyan	14 June 1993	March 1996	Independent
	Arthur Tovmasyan	March 1996	2 December 1997	Independent
	Oleg Yesayan	2 December 1997	1 July 2005	Independent
	Ashot Ghulian	1 July 2005	21 May 2020	Democratic
	Arthur Tovmasyan	21 May 2020	29 July 2023	Free Motherland
	Davit Ishkhanyan	7 August 2023	3 October 2023 (captured by Azerbaijan)	Armenian Revolutionary Federation
	Ashot Danielyan	21 May 2025	2 July 2026	Free Motherland
	Gagik Baghunts (acting)	2 July 2026	Incumbent	United Motherland

== See also ==
- National Assembly (Artsakh)
- Politics of Artsakh
- President of Artsakh
- President of the National Assembly of Armenia
- Prime Minister of the Nagorno-Karabakh Republic
- State Minister of Artsakh
