= Arkadi Ghukasyan =

2nd President of Artsakh

- Արկադի Ղուկասյան
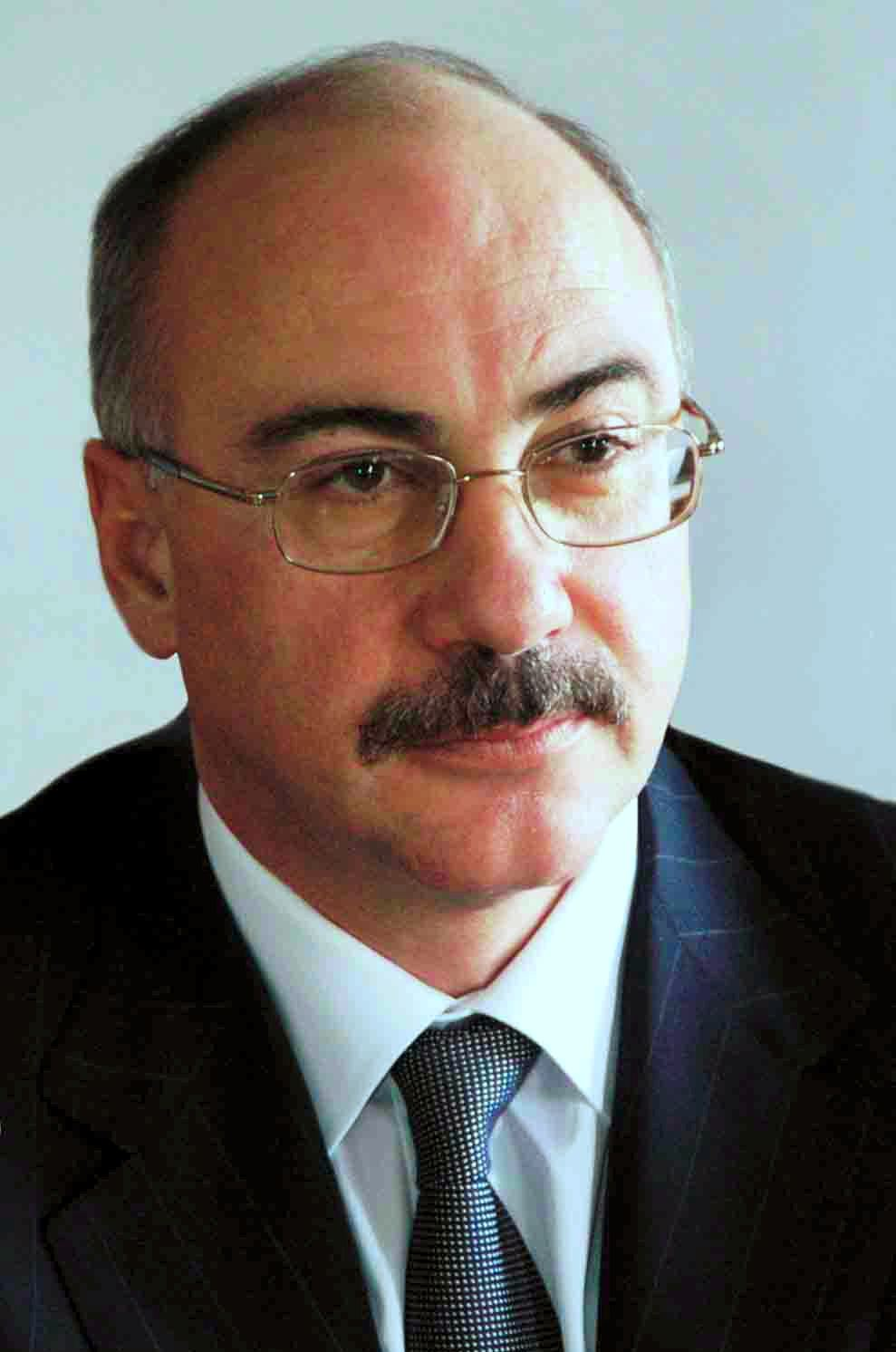

2nd President of the Nagorno-Karabakh Republic
- In office 8 September 1997 – 7 September 2007
- Prime Minister: Leonard Petrosyan; Zhirayr Poghosyan; Anushavan Danielyan
- Preceded by: Leonard Petrosyan (acting)
- Succeeded by: Bako Sahakyan

Foreign Minister of Nagorno-Karabakh
- In office 23 July 1993 – 8 September 1997
- President: Robert Kocharyan; Leonard Petrosyan
- Preceded by: position established
- Succeeded by: Naira Melkumian

Personal details
- Born: 22 June 1957 (age 69) Stepanakert, Nagorno-Karabakh Autonomous Oblast, Azerbaijan SSR, Soviet Union
- Party: Independent
- Education: Yerevan State University

Arkadi Arshaviri Ghukasyan (Armenian: Արկադի Արշավիրի Ղուկասյան; born 22 June 1957) is an Armenian politician who served as the second President of the self-proclaimed Nagorno-Karabakh Republic. He was elected as the President on 8 September 1997 and re-elected in 2002, until his term ended on 7 September 2007 and was succeeded by Bako Sahakyan. He was detained by Azerbaijani forces after the 2023 Azerbaijani offensive in Nagorno-Karabakh and is currently facing criminal charges in Azerbaijan.

== Biography ==
Arkadi Ghukasyan was born in Stepanakert in the Nagorno-Karabakh Autonomous Republic of the Azerbaijan SSR on 22 June 1957. He graduated from Yerevan State University with a degree in linguistics in 1979. He started his career as a correspondent for the newspaper Khorhrdayin Gharabagh ("Soviet Karabakh"), becoming its deputy editor-in-chief in 1981.

In 1991, Ghukasyan was elected to the first parliament of the newly declared Nagorno-Karabakh Republic (NKR). In September 1992, he was appointed political adviser to the Chairman of the State Defense Committee, and headed the NKR's delegations during OSCE-mediated negotiations with Azerbaijan.

Ghukasyan was a member of Nagorno-Karabakh's Security Council since 1993. On 23 July 1993, he became the first Foreign Minister of the Nagorno-Karabakh Republic.

He survived an assassination attempt in 2000. Samvel Babayan, whom he had recently sacked as defence minister, was convicted of organising the attack and sentenced to 14 years in prison. Babayan was released from imprisonment on 18 September 2004 due to health concerns, with the terms of release including a probationary period and continued disenfranchisement.

In 2015, it was reported that Ghukasyan was the unofficial leader of the Artsakh Republican Party.

On 3 October 2023, Ghukasyan and two other former presidents of Artsakh, Bako Sahakyan and Arayik Harutyunyan, together with former president of the National Assembly Davit Ishkhanyan, were detained by the State Security Service of Azerbaijan and brought to Baku. Ghukasyan and the other arrested former officials faced "grave criminal charges" in Azerbaijan. On 5 February 2026, an Azerbaijan military court sentenced Ghukasyan to 20 years of imprisonment on charges such as "waging an aggressive war," "violent seizure of power", etc.

== Personal life ==
He has divorced once and remarried.

Preceded by Leonard Petrosyan	President of Nagorno-Karabakh; 1997–2007	Succeeded by Bako Sahakyan
