= Prime Minister of the Nagorno-Karabakh Republic =

Head of government of the de facto republic

- Արցախի հանրապետության վարչապետ (Armenian); Премьер-Министр Нагорно-Карабахской Республики (Russian)
- Coat of arms of Artsakh
- Status: Abolished
- Residence: Stepanakert
- Appointer: President of Artsakh
- Formation: 8 January 1992
- First holder: Oleg Yesayan
- Final holder: Arayik Harutyunyan
- Abolished: 7 September 2017

The prime minister of Nagorno-Karabakh Republic was the head of government of the unrecognized Nagorno-Karabakh Republic between 1992 and 2017.

The position of prime minister was established in 1992, and was appointed by the head of state—the president. In a constitutional referendum held in 2017, citizens voted in favour of transforming Artsakh into a presidential system and the office of prime minister was abolished. The president become both the head of state and the head of government.

This is a list of the prime ministers of the Republic of Artsakh.

== List of officeholders (1992–2024) ==
=== Prime ministers (1992–2017) ===
No.	Portrait	Name (Birth–Death)	Term			Political party
No.	Portrait	Name (Birth–Death)	Took office	Left office	Time in office	Political party
1	Oleg Yesayan	Oleg Yesayan (born 1946)	8 January 1992	August 1992	6 months	Independent
2	Robert Kocharyan	Robert Kocharyan (born 1954)	August 1992	29 December 1994	2 years, 4 months	Independent
3	Leonard Petrosyan	Leonard Petrosyan (1952–1999)	December 1994	June 1998	3 years, 6 months	Independent
4	Zhirayr Poghosyan	Zhirayr Poghosyan (born 1942)	June 1998	24 June 1999	1 year	Independent
5	Anushavan Danielyan	Anushavan Danielyan (born 1954)	30 June 1999	12 September 2007	8 years, 74 days	Independent
6	Arayik Harutyunyan	Arayik Harutyunyan (born 1973)	14 September 2007	25 September 2017	10 years, 11 days	Free Motherland

=== State ministers (2017–2024) ===
No.	Portrait	Name (Birth–Death)	Term			Political party	President
No.	Portrait	Name (Birth–Death)	Took office	Left office	Time in office	Political party	President
1		Arayik Harutyunyan (born 1973)	25 September 2017	6 June 2018	254 days	Free Motherland	Bako Sahakyan (Cabinet)
2		Grigory Martirosyan (born 1978)	6 June 2018	1 June 2021	2 years, 360 days	Independent	Bako Sahakyan (Cabinet)
3		Artak Beglaryan (born 1988)	3 June 2021	3 November 2022	1 year, 153 days	Independent	Arayik Harutyunyan (Cabinet)
4		Ruben Vardanyan (born 1968)	4 November 2022	23 February 2023	111 days	Independent	Arayik Harutyunyan (Cabinet)
5		Gurgen Nersisyan (born 1985)	24 February 2023	31 August 2023	188 days	Independent	Arayik Harutyunyan (Cabinet)
6		Samvel Shahramanyan (born 1978)	31 August 2023	10 September 2023	10 days	Independent	Davit Ishkhanyan
7		Artur Harutyunyan (born 1979)	18 September 2023	1 January 2024	105 days	Free Motherland	Samvel Shahramanyan

== See also ==
- President of Artsakh
- President of the National Assembly of Artsakh
- State Minister of Artsakh
