= Anushavan Danielyan =

Nagorno-Karabakh politician

- Անուշավան Դանիելյան

Prime Minister of Nagorno-Karabakh
- In office 30 June 1999 – 12 September 2007
- President: Arkadi Ghukasyan; Bako Sahakyan
- Preceded by: Zhirayr Poghosyan
- Succeeded by: Arayik Harutyunyan

Deputy Chairman of the Supreme Council of Crimea
- In office July 1995 – September 1996
- Prime Minister: Anatoliy Franchuk; Arkadiy Demydenko
- In office February 1997 – April 1998
- Prime Minister: Arkadiy Demydenko; Anatoliy Franchuk

Personal details
- Born: 1 August 1956 (age 70) Bolnis-Khachen (Bolnisi), Georgian SSR, Soviet Union
- Party: Independent
- Education: Simferopol State University

Military service
- Branch/service: Soviet Army
- Years of service: 1975—1977

Anushavan Sureni Danielyan (Armenian: Անուշավան Սուրենի Դանիելյան; born 1 August 1956) was Prime Minister of the Nagorno-Karabakh Republic (Artsakh) from June 1999 through September 2007. He was succeeded by Arayik Harutyunyan.

== Early life ==
Danielyan was born in the Soviet village of Bolnis-Khachen, founded in the Bolnisi Municipality (Georgian SSR) by settlers from the Armenian Principality of Khachen (Artsakh).

In the 1990s, he was a vice-speaker of the Supreme Council of Crimea for the party Party of Economic Revival of Crimea.

Political offices
Preceded by Zhirayr Poghosyan	Prime Minister of Nagorno-Karabakh; 1999–2007	Succeeded by Arayik Harutyunyan
