= Robert Kocharyan =

Former leader of the Nagorno-Karabakh Republic and Armenia

- Ռոբերտ Քոչարյան
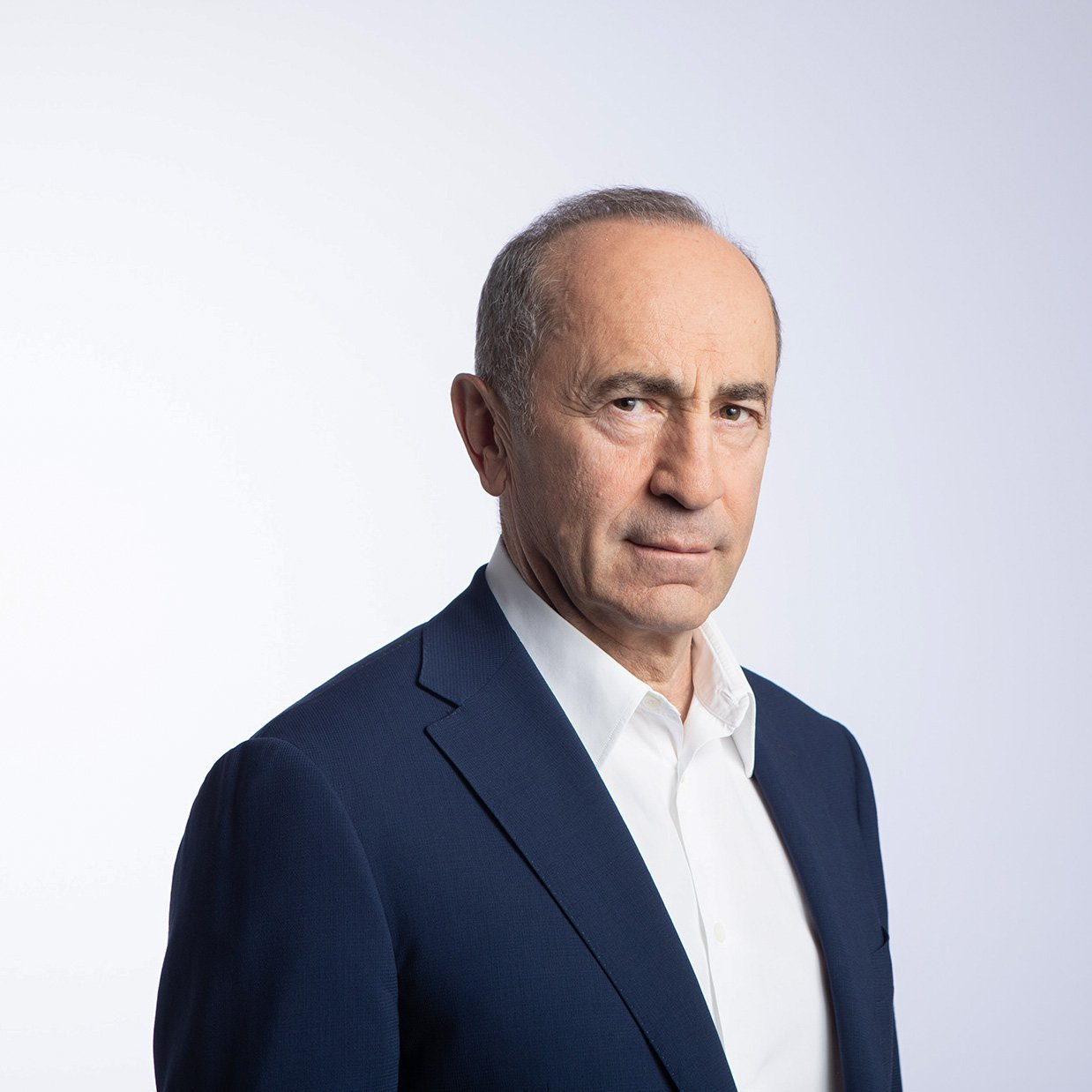
- Official portrait, c. 2024

2nd President of Armenia
- In office 9 April 1998 – 9 April 2008; Acting: 4 February 1998 – 9 April 1998
- Prime Minister: Armen Darbinyan; Vazgen Sargsyan; Aram Sargsyan; Andranik Margaryan; Serzh Sargsyan
- Preceded by: Levon Ter-Petrosyan
- Succeeded by: Serzh Sargsyan

6th Prime Minister of Armenia
- In office 20 March 1997 – 10 April 1998
- President: Levon Ter-Petrosyan
- Preceded by: Armen Sarkissian
- Succeeded by: Armen Darbinyan

Leader of the Armenia Alliance
- Incumbent
- Assumed office 9 May 2021
- Preceded by: Position established
Senior political offices in Nagorno-Karabakh
1st President of Nagorno-Karabakh
In office 29 December 1994 – 20 March 1997
Prime Minister	Leonard Petrosyan
Preceded by	Garen Baburyan (Acting)
Succeeded by	Leonard Petrosyan (Acting)
2nd Prime Minister of Nagorno-Karabakh
In office August 1992 – 29 December 1994
President	Georgy Petrosyan (Acting); Karen Baburyan (Acting)
Preceded by	Oleg Yesayan
Succeeded by	Leonard Petrosyan

Personal details
- Born: 31 August 1954 (age 72) Stepanakert, Nagorno-Karabakh Autonomous Oblast, Soviet Union
- Party: Independent
- Other political affiliations: Armenia Alliance
- Spouse: Bella Kocharyan
- Children: 3
- Education: National Polytechnic University of Armenia
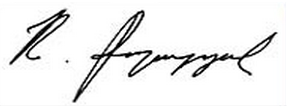
- Signature
- Website: robertkocharyan.am

Robert Sedraki Kocharyan (Armenian: Ռոբերտ Սեդրակի Քոչարյան pronounced [rɔˈbɛɾt sɛtʰɾɑˈki kʰɔtʃʰɑɾˈjɑn]; born 31 August 1954) is an Armenian politician. He served as the President of the Nagorno-Karabakh Republic from 1994 to 1997 and Prime Minister of Nagorno-Karabakh from 1992 to 1994. He served as the second President of Armenia between 1998 and 2008 and as Prime Minister of Armenia from 1997 to 1998.

Kocharyan was elected president of Armenia twice, in 1998 and 2003; both presidential elections were held in two rounds. During most of his presidency, between 2001 and 2007, Armenia's economy grew on average by 12% annually, largely due to a construction boom. While Kocharyan's supporters credit him with securing Armenia's economic growth during his presidency, his critics accuse him of promoting corruption and the creation of an oligarchic system of government in Armenia.

On 26 July 2018 Kocharyan was charged in connection with the crackdown on the 2008 Armenian presidential election protests in the final weeks of his presidency, which resulted in the deaths of ten people. Kocharyan's trial began on 13 May 2019. The trial ended in March 2021 after the Constitutional Court of Armenia declared unconstitutional the article of the criminal code under which Kocharyan was being tried.

Kocharyan returned to active participation in Armenian politics following the Second Nagorno-Karabakh War in 2020. He participated in the 2021 Armenian parliamentary election as the head of the Armenia Alliance with the Armenian Revolutionary Federation and the Reborn Armenia party, which came in second place after Nikol Pashinyan's Civil Contract party and entered parliament as the opposition.

== Early life and Nagorno-Karabakh war ==
Robert Kocharyan was born on 31 August 1954 in Stepanakert, capital of the Nagorno-Karabakh Autonomous Oblast. He received his secondary education in Stepanakert and served in the Soviet Army from 1972 to 1974. Kocharyan's career began as an engineer at Stepanakert's electro-technical plant in 1971. In 1982, he graduated with honors from the Electro-Technical Department of the Karl Marx Polytechnic Institute in Yerevan (now called the National Polytechnic University of Armenia).

Throughout the 1980s, he occupied various posts in Nagorno-Karabakh's communist youth league and party. At one point he served as deputy secretary of the Stepanakert Komsomol, which was headed by his later successor as president of Armenia Serzh Sargsyan. By February 1988, Kocharyan became one of the leaders of the Karabakh movement as a member of the Krunk ("Crane") organization. The Karabakh movement, which started in Nagorno-Karabakh then spread to Soviet Armenia, sought to achieve the transfer of the autonomous region from Azerbaijan to Armenia. After the organization broke apart, he founded the Miatsum ("Unification") organization. In 1989, he was elected to Soviet Armenia's Supreme Soviet. In 1991, Kocharyan was elected to the Supreme Soviet of the newly established Nagorno-Karabakh Republic (NKR). Kocharyan became a member of the Pan-Armenian National Movement (then the ruling party of Armenia) and its executive board, representing the party in Nagorno-Karabakh. In January 1992, Kocharyan was a candidate for president of the Supreme Soviet of the NKR, but lost to Artur Mkrtchyan, a member of the Armenian Revolutionary Federation.

With the dissolution of the Soviet Union, the Nagorno-Karabakh conflict plunged into all-out war. Kocharyan participated in the Capture of Shusha in May 1992, one of the most significant Armenian victories of the war. In August 1992, Kocharyan became chairman of the State Defense Committee of the NKR, an extraordinary body which held all executive powers during the war. That year he also became prime minister of the Nagorno-Karabakh Republic. Kocharyan coordinated the war effort of the Nagorno-Karabakh Republic in its war against Azerbaijan, which ended in an Armenian victory with the signing of a ceasefire agreement in May 1994 by representatives of Armenia, Azerbaijan and the NKR. Kocharyan was elected NKR's first president on 24 December 1994 by the decision of the NKR Supreme Soviet. He was reelected by popular vote in November 1996.

== Prime Minister of Armenia ==
On 20 March 1997, Kocharyan left his post as President of the NKR when he was appointed Prime Minister of Armenia by President Levon Ter-Petrosyan. In February 1998, President Ter-Petrosyan was forced to step down by Kocharyan, Defense Minister Vazgen Sargsyan, and Interior Minister Serzh Sargsyan, who were opposed to Ter-Petrosyan's move to accept a peace plan for Karabakh put forward by international mediators in September 1997. The plan, accepted by Ter-Petrosyan and Azerbaijan, called for a "phased" settlement of the conflict which would postpone an agreement on Karabakh's status. The first phase of the agreement envisioned the return of most Armenian-controlled Azerbaijani territories around Karabakh in exchange for security guarantees, demilitarization of Nagorno-Karabakh and the surrounding territories, and the lifting of the Azerbaijani and Turkish blockades of Armenia.

== President of Armenia ==
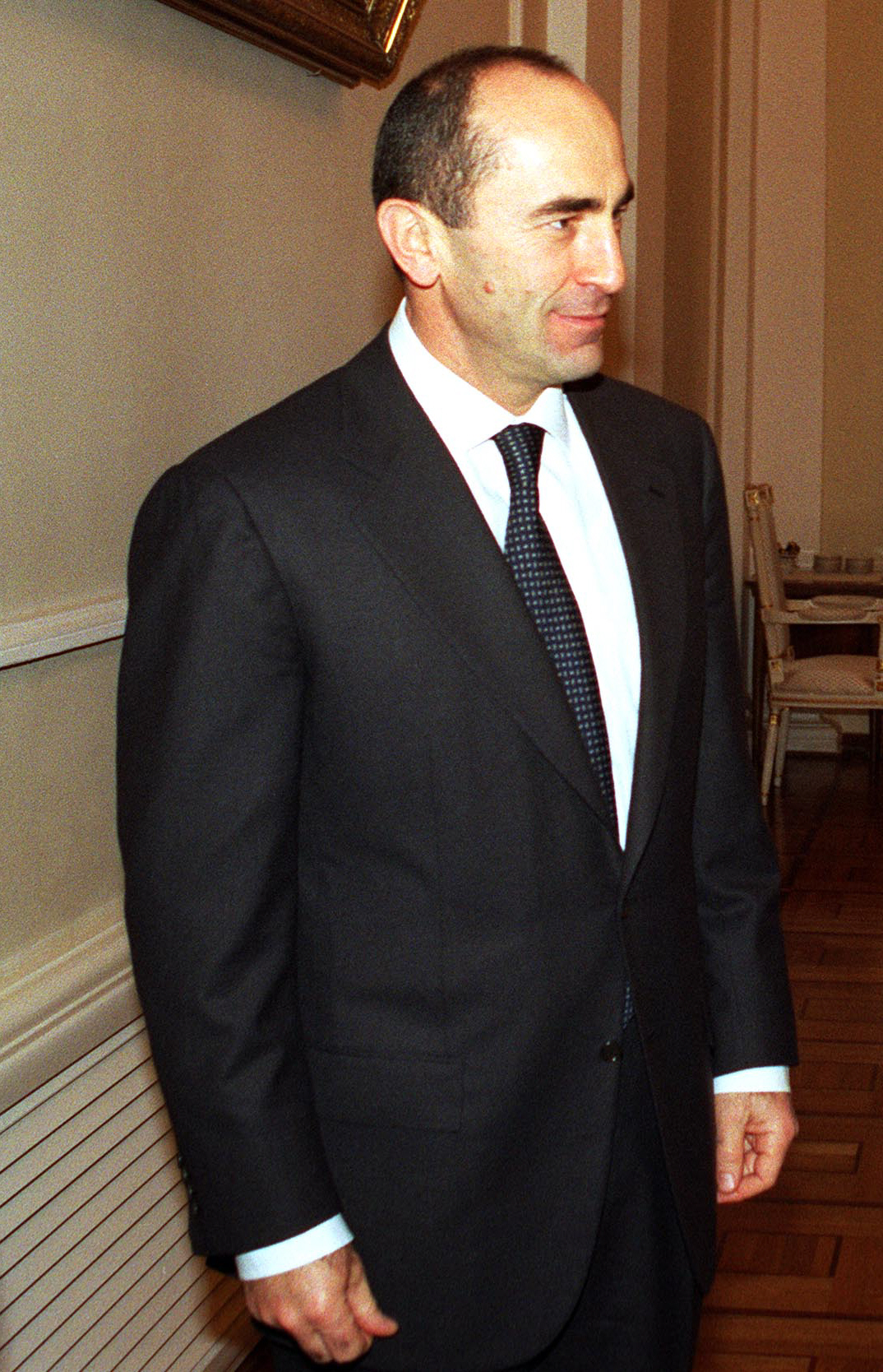
Kocharyan in December 2001

After his predecessor Levon Ter-Petrosyan was ousted as President, Kocharyan was elected Armenia's second President on 30 March 1998, defeating his main rival, Karen Demirchyan (who was a former leader of Soviet Armenia), in an early presidential election marred by irregularities and violations by both sides as reported by international electoral observers. There were also complaints that Kocharyan was not eligible to run under the Armenian constitution, which required candidates to be an Armenian citizen and have resided in Armenia for ten years. Before he became prime minister, Kocharyan resided in and was considered a citizen of the Nagorno-Karabakh Republic. Kocharyan was supported by Vazgen Sargsyan's Republican Party, as well as the banned Armenian Revolutionary Federation, which he relegalized early in his presidency.

After their coalition won a majority of seats in parliamentary elections in May 1999, Vazgen Sargsyan took the office of prime minister while Karen Demirchyan became speaker of the parliament. On 27 October 1999, Vazgen Sargsyan and Karen Demirchyan were killed along with six other government officials by five gunmen in an episode known as the 1999 Armenian parliament shooting. The attackers then took around fifty people hostage in the parliament building. Kocharyan himself negotiated with the terrorists to release the hostages and surrender to police. Kocharyan and his ally Serzh Sargsyan, who was minister of national security at the time of the shooting, have been suspected of covering up or even masterminding the attack in order to consolidate political power by their political opponents and some relatives and supporters of the assassinated officials. The possibility of Kocharyan's involvement in the events was considered during the investigation in 2000; although several individuals close to Kocharyan were arrested, they were released months later, and no evidence was found implicating Kocharyan or anyone besides the five attackers in the shooting. Kocharyan's predecessor Levon Ter-Petrosyan repeatedly accused him and Serzh Sargsyan of being complicit in the 1999 shooting in his campaign speeches before the 2008 presidential election.

In 2001 Kocharyan was attending a jazz performance at Poplavok cafe in Yerevan, and was greeted by former classmate Poghos Poghosyan with the words "Hi Rob". The casualness of the greeting was taken as an insult, and Kocharyan's bodyguards took Poghosyan into the café toilet and killed him. The bodyguard, Aghamal Harutiunyan, received a one-year suspended jail term for the killing.

=== 2003 election ===
The 2003 Armenian Presidential election was held on 19 February and 5 March 2003. No candidate received a majority in the first round of the election with the incumbent President Kocharyan winning slightly under 50% of the vote. Therefore, a second round was held and Kocharyan defeated Stepan Demirchyan (son of Karen Demirchyan) with official results showed him winning just over 67% of the vote.

Kocharyan's approval rating in IRI polls
Date	Favorable	Unfavorable
Nov 2006	33%	66%
Mar 2007	40%	51%
Jul 2007	42%	52%
Sep 2007	42%	52%
Oct 2007	49%	46%
Dec 2007	53%	42%
Jan 2008	48%	48%

In both rounds, electoral observers from the Organization for Security and Co-operation in Europe reported significant amounts of electoral fraud by Demirchyan's supporters and numerous supporters of Demirchyan were arrested before the second round took place. Demirchyan described the election as having been rigged and called on his supporters to rally against the results. Tens of thousands of Armenians protested in the days after the election against the results and called on President Kocharyan to step down. However Kocharyan was sworn in for a second term in early April and the constitutional court upheld the election, while recommending that a referendum be held within a year to confirm the election result. On 14 April 2004 Armenian poet Silva Kaputikyan wrote an open letter Kocharyan Must Go, where she protested Kocharyan's harsh methods towards the demonstrators on 12–13 April 2004. She also turned back Mesrop Mashtots Medal awarded by Kocharyan some years ago.

=== 2008 election ===
A presidential election was held in Armenia on 19 February 2008. The incumbent President Kocharyan, who was ineligible for a third consecutive term, backed the candidacy of Prime Minister of Armenia Serzh Sargsyan.

Following the election result, protests organized by supporters of unsuccessful candidate Levon Ter-Petrosyan began in Yerevan's Freedom Square and accompanied by mass disorders. The opposition accused the government of rigging the election in Sargsyan's favor. On 1 March, the demonstrators were dispersed by police and military forces. Ten people (eight protestors and two policemen) were killed during clashes between police and protestors, and President Kocharyan declared a 20-day state of emergency. This was followed by mass arrests and purges of prominent members of the opposition, as well as a de facto ban on any further anti-government protests.

=== Foreign policy ===
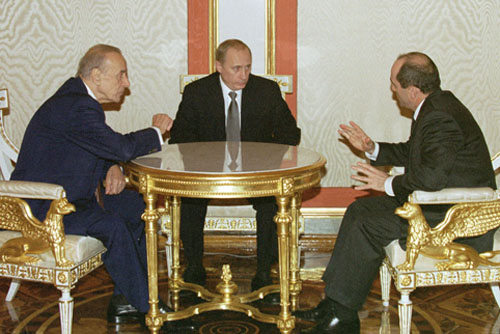
Kocharyan with Russian President Vladimir Putin and Azerbaijani President Heydar Aliyev, November 2001

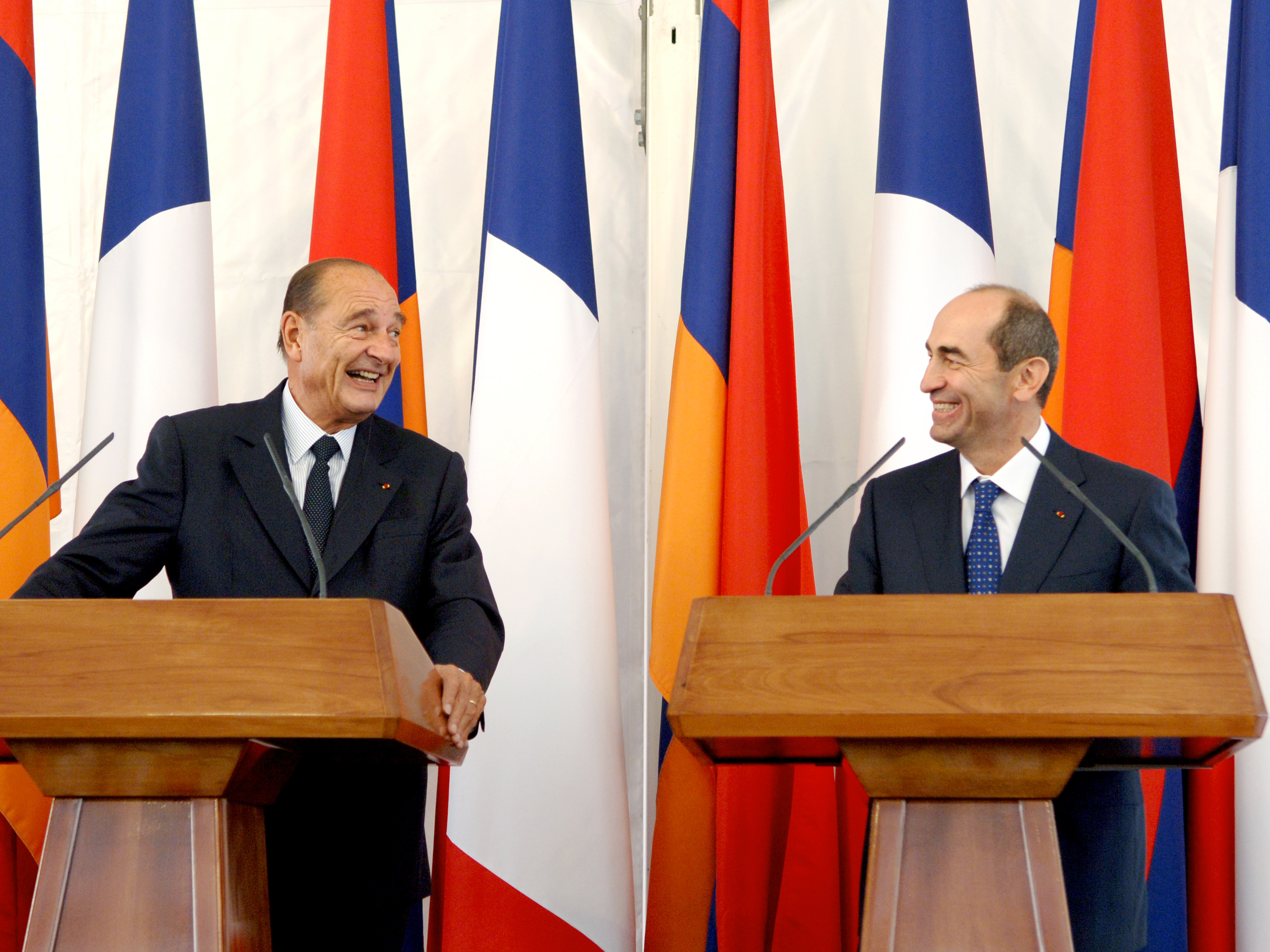
Kocharyan with French President Jacques Chirac, September 2006

As President, Kocharyan continued to negotiate a peaceful resolution with Azerbaijani Presidents Heydar Aliyev and Ilham Aliyev on the status of Nagorno-Karabakh. Kocharyan was generally in favor of achieving a "package deal" settlement of the conflict, whereby all issues, including the final status of Nagorno-Karabakh would be resolved in one agreement, rather than a "phased" settlement whereby Armenian forces would withdraw from the territories surrounding Nagorno-Karabakh in exchange for security guarantees while Karabakh's status would be left for future negotiations. In October 1999, Kocharyan became the first President of Armenia to visit Azerbaijan, holding talks with Heydar Aliyev at the border of the two countries. Kocharyan and Heydar Aliyev reportedly came particularly close to an agreement during US-mediated negotiations at Key West in April 2001. In his memoirs, Kocharyan later claimed that Aliyev stood ready in his discussions to recognize Karabakh as a part of Armenia.

Talks between Kocharyan and Ilham Aliyev, Heydar Aliyev's son and successor, were held in September 2004 in Astana, Kazakhstan, on the sidelines of the Commonwealth of Independent States (CIS) summit. Reportedly, one of the suggestions put forward was the withdrawal of Armenian forces from the Azeri territories adjacent to Nagorno-Karabakh, and holding referendums (plebiscites) in Nagorno-Karabakh and Azerbaijan proper regarding the future status of the region. On 10–11 February 2006, Kocharyan and Aliyev met in Rambouillet, France to discuss the fundamental principles of a settlement to the conflict, including the withdrawal of troops, formation of international peacekeeping troops, and the status of Nagorno-Karabakh.

During the weeks and days before the talks in France, OSCE Minsk Group co-chairmen expressed cautious optimism that some form of an agreement was possible. French President Jacques Chirac met with both leaders separately and expressed hope that the talks would be fruitful. Contrary to the initial optimism, the Rambouillet talks did not produce any agreement, with key issues such as the status of Nagorno-Karabakh and whether Armenian troops would withdraw from Kalbajar still being contentious. The next session of the talks was held in March 2006 in Washington, D.C. Russian President, Vladimir Putin applied pressure to both parties to settle the disputes. Later in 2006 there was a meeting of the Armenian and Azerbaijani Presidents in Minsk on 28 November and ministerial meetings were held in Moscow. "These talks did not initiate any progress, but I hope that the time for a solution will come" said Peter Semneby, EU envoy for the South Caucasus.

In September 2006, in his congratulatory message on the occasion of 15th anniversary of Nagorno-Karabakh Republic, Kocharyan said "The Karabakhi people made their historic choice, defended their national interests in the war that was forced upon them. Today, they are building a free and independent state." The accompanying message said that the duty of the Republic of Armenia and all Armenians is to contribute to the strengthening and development of Nagorno-Karabakh, as well as to the international recognition of the republic's independence.

== Post-presidency ==
=== Arrest ===
On 26 July 2018, the Special Investigative Service (SIS) of Armenia charged Kocharian with “overthrowing constitutional order of Armenia” during the final weeks of his presidency. The SIS asked a Yerevan court to remand him in pre-trial custody.

On 27 July 2018, he was arrested. On 13 August 2018, Kocharyan was freed from custody following a court ruling, but remained accused of the charges he was arrested for. On 7 December 2018, Kocharyan was arrested again following another ruling by the Court of Appeals.

In 2019, all Kocharyan's assets and property, other than his pension, were frozen by the court. On 18 May 2019, Kocharyan was freed on bail from pre-trial detention. On 25 June 2019, he was arrested for the third time. He was again released a year later, on 18 June 2020, on bail.

=== Second Nagorno-Karabakh War and aftermath ===
During the Second Nagorno-Karabakh War, Kocharyan met with fellow ex-presidents of Armenia Levon Ter-Petroysan and Serzh Sargsyan as well as ex-presidents of Nagorno-Karabakh Arkadi Ghukasyan and Bako Sahakyan to discuss the situation. In October 2020, Kocharyan and Ter-Petrosyan requested that Prime Minister Nikol Pashinyan give them permission to go to Moscow as special negotiators. Pashinyan accepted their request to go to Moscow to meet with Russian officials, but not as official negotiators. The visit never occurred as Kocharyan tested positive for COVID-19.

After the defeat of the Armenian side in the war and the signing of the 2020 Nagorno-Karabakh ceasefire agreement, Kocharyan joined other ex-presidents and opposition politicians in calling for Nikol Pashinyan's resignation. He declared his support for Vazgen Manukyan, who was nominated by a coalition of 17 opposition parties, known as the Homeland Salvation Movement (which includes the Republican Party), to lead an interim national unity government. In January 2021, Kocharyan declared his intention to participate in the next elections.

In March 2021, the Constitutional Court of Armenia ruled that criminal case against Kocharyan must be dropped as the article of the Criminal Code under which he is being prosecuted (Article 300.1) runs counter to two articles of the country's constitution. This ruling cannot be overturned.

On 7 May 2021, Kocharian confirmed his intention to participate in the June 2021 snap parliamentary elections as part of a political alliance with the Armenian Revolutionary Federation and the Reborn Armenia party. The alliance was named Armenia Alliance and was led by Kocharyan. He lost the elections to Nikol Pashinyan and his Civil Contract party, with the election results showing the Armenia Alliance party had come in second with 21% of votes. After the conclusion of the election, Kocharyan and the Armenia Alliance party contested the votes and demanded an investigation into claims of voter fraud. Kocharyan declined to take his seat in the National Assembly and continues to lead the Armenia Alliance outside of parliament.

== Views ==
Robert Kocharyan has long supported Armenia's close ties with Russia and considers Vladimir Putin a friend and ally. In a 2019 article in Sputnik-Armenia, he praised Russia's emerging role in global politics and was harshly critical of what he described as a pro-Western government following the 2018 Armenian revolution:

The United States' trade war with China, the contrived series of sanctions against Russia, the U.S.'s withdrawal from the Intermediate-Range Nuclear Forces Treaty, the U.S. detachment from the unfolding Middle East drama, an unexpected rapprochement between Russia and Turkey in Syria, an impressive Russia-Africa forum – this is an incomplete list of convincing signs of the formation of a new multi-polar world order. The current situation requires deep understanding and a well-defined foreign policy that can neutralize new challenges and threats for Armenia and Nagorno-Karabakh.

Kocharyan suggests that relations between Turkey and Azerbaijan have further strengthened in recent years, "becoming a cornerstone in the context of the revived pan-Turkist aspirations, which pose a direct threat to Armenia and Nagorno-Karabakh".

In this situation, cooperation with Russia in the field of security becomes even more important for Armenia and obviously has no alternative for the country. Only irresponsible or recruited politicians can today insist on the withdrawal of the Russian base from the country. The Kurdish tragedy unfolding in northern Syria should be a clear lesson of consequences of political shortsightedness.

After Armenia's defeat, he calls for "full integration" with Russia and gives his support for Armenia to join the Russian-led Union State.

== Personal life ==
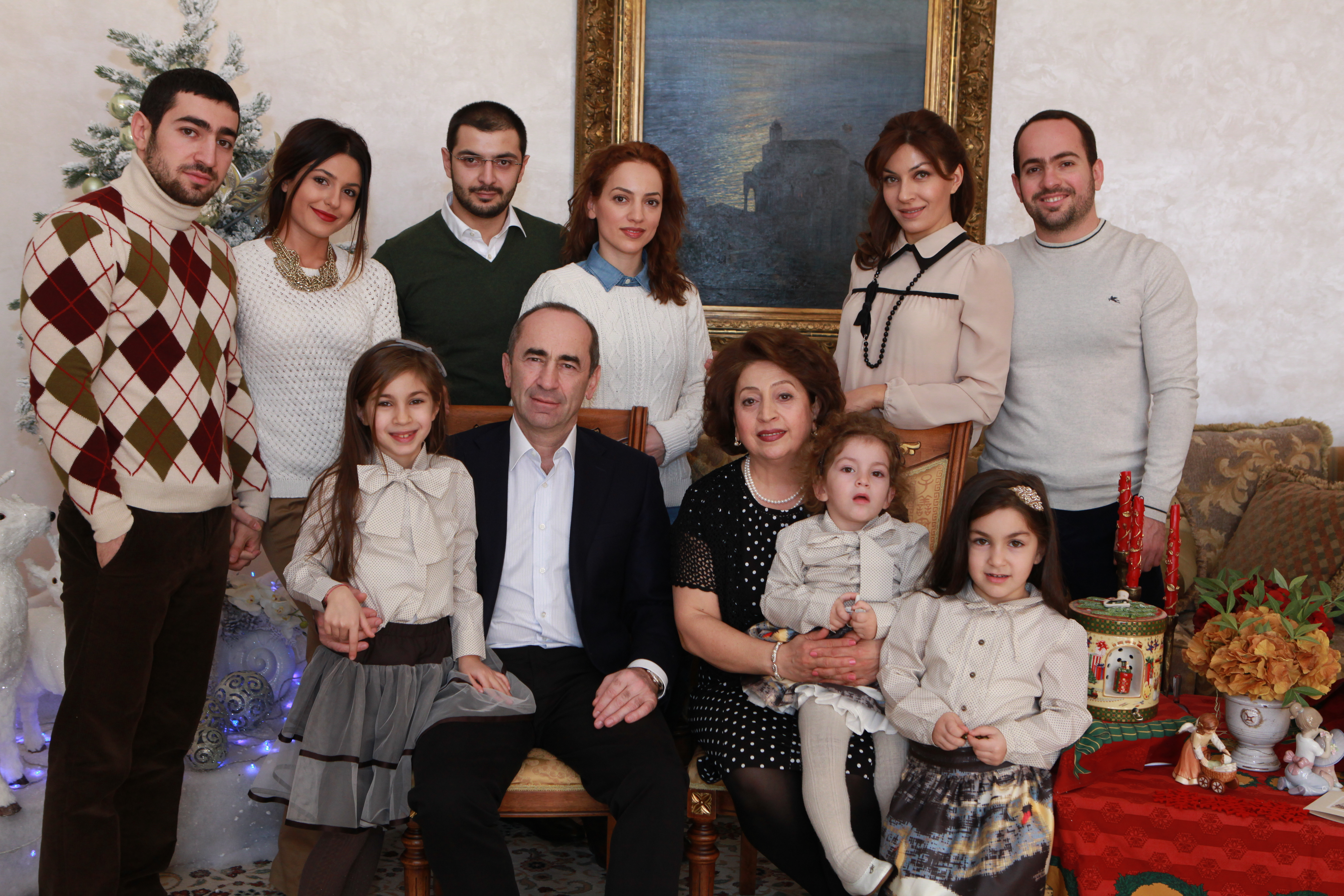
Robert Kocharyan with his family in 2013

He and his wife, Bella Kocharyan, have three children: Sedrak, Gayane, and Levon, all of whom were born in Stepanakert. In addition to his native Armenian, Kocharyan speaks Russian and English. In his memoirs that were published in 2020, he admitted to having a poor command of standard Armenian, saying that he "had difficulties with writing and reading in Armenian". He attributes this to his homeland of Karabakh, where many local Armenians speak the local Karabakh dialect or Russian as their first language. Although he was baptized in the Armenian Apostolic Church by Archbishop Pargev Martirosyan in 1996, he has stated that he is not a believer.

== Awards and honors ==
- Republic of Artsakh:
  - Hero of Artsakh
  - Order of Gregory the Illuminator
  - Medal "For the Liberation of Shushi"
- Georgia:
  - Order of Honor
- Greece:
  - Grand Cross of the Order of the Redeemer
- France:
  - Knight Grand Cross of the Legion of Honour
- Lebanon:
  - Grand Cordon of the National Order of the Cedar
- Lithuania:
  - Grand Cross of the Order of Vytautas the Great (2002)
- Palestine:
  - Order of the Star of Bethlehem 2000
- Poland:
  - Order of the White Eagle (2004)
- Commonwealth of Independent States:
  - Honorary Badge of the Commonwealth of Independent States (2008)
- International Olympic Committee:
  - Olympic Order (2004)

Political offices
Preceded by Oleg Yesayan	Prime Minister of Nagorno-Karabakh; 1992–1994	Succeeded by Leonard Petrosyan
Preceded by Garen Baburyan; Acting	President of Nagorno-Karabakh; 1994–1997	Succeeded by Leonard Petrosyan; Acting
Preceded by Armen Sarkissian	Prime Minister of Armenia; 1997–1998	Succeeded by Armen Darbinyan
Preceded by Levon Ter-Petrosyan	President of Armenia; 1998–2008	Succeeded by Serzh Sargsyan
