= Karen Grigory Sargsyan =

Former Minister of Internal Affairs, Republic of Artsakh

- Կարեն Գրիգորի Սարգսյան
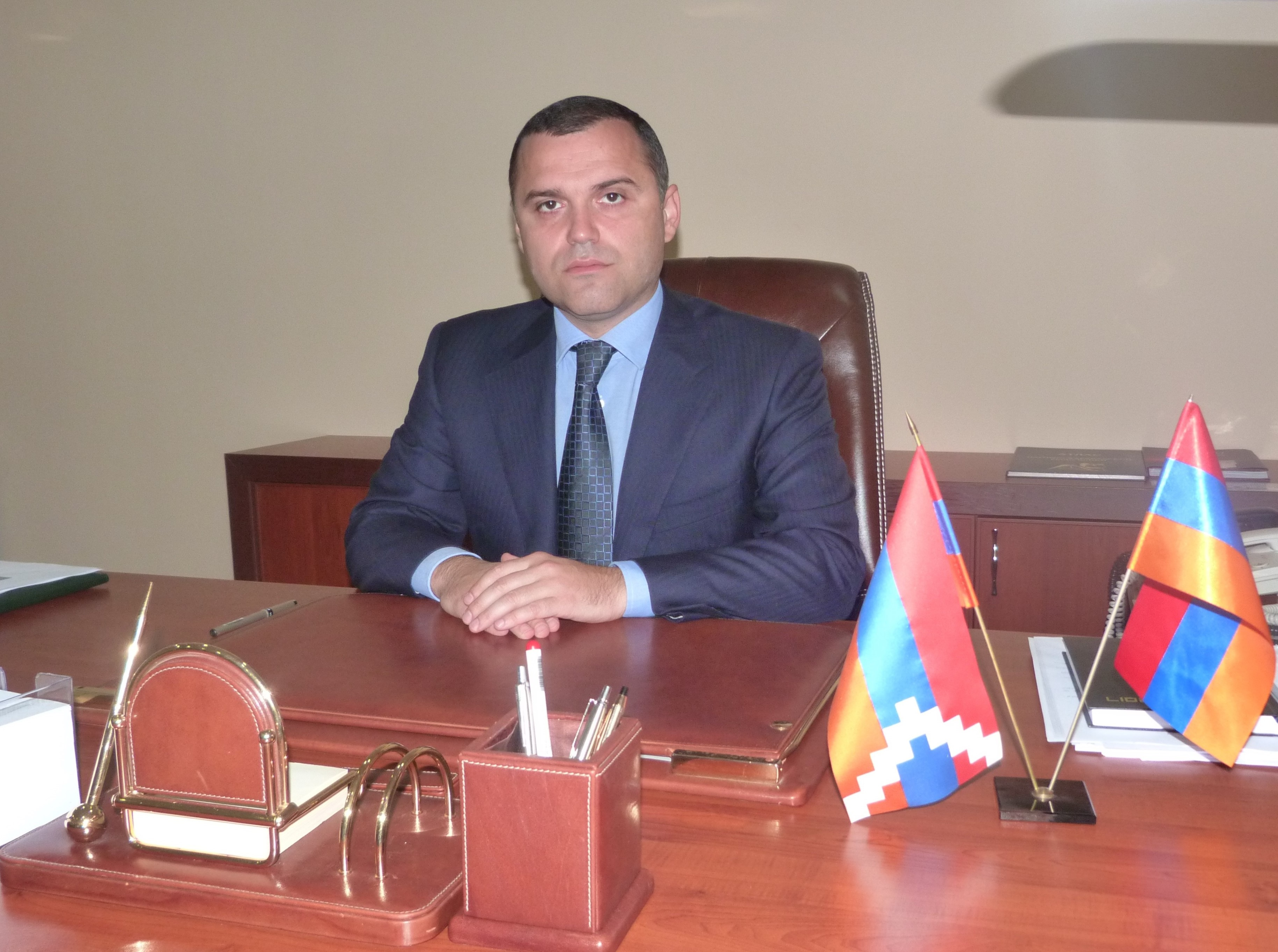
- Karen Sargsyan

Minister of Internal Affairs
- In office 26 January 2021 – 1 January 2024

Director of the State Service of Emergency Situations
- In office 26 May 2020 – 26 January 2021
- Appointed by: Arayik Harutyunyan

Personal details
- Born: 18 December 1980 (age 45) Stepanakert, Azerbaijan SSR
- Children: 4
- Education: Yerevan State University

Karen Grigory Sargsyan (Armenian: Կարեն Գրիգորի Սարգսյան; born 18 December 1980) is the former Minister of Internal Affairs of the Republic of Artsakh. The ministry was disbanded along with the Artsakh government on 1 January 2024.

== Career ==
From 2004 to 2014 he served in the republic's State Tax Service. From then until 2017 he served in a variety of task forces by decree of the President of Artsakh Bako Sahakyan. On 19 February 2019 he resigned or was dismissed from the post of representing the President at large. On 26 May 2020, the succeeding President, Arayik Harutyunyan, appointed Sargsyan as the Director of the State Service of Emergency Situations. On 26 January 2021 by decree of the President and head of the Government of Artsakh, Sargsyan was appointed as Minister of Internal Affairs.

The ministry had responsibilities in the areas of policing, fire and rescue, monitoring seismic activity and emergency response. Colonel Artyom Harutyunyan was the Chief of Police. On 20 February 2021, a delegation led by Andranik Piloyan, the Minister of Emergency Situations of Armenia, paid an official visit to the Republic of Artsakh. They were met by the President of Artsakh, the Minister of Internal Affairs, and by Mekhak Arzumanyan, the Director of the State Emergency Service of the Republic of Artsakh. The two sides discussed cooperation between the two republics and how to respond to emergency situations.

He was working with the President to discover the fate of the missing servicemen and civilians and to return the prisoners of war from Azerbaijan.

On 26 March 2021, the Minister dealt with a complaint concerning alleged stone throwing by Azeri servicemen on the Sarushen-Karmir village road. He handed photographic evidence to General Rustam Muradov of the Russian peacekeeping service.

== Personal life ==
Sargsyan was born in Stepanakert. He is married with four children. In 2003, he graduated from Yerevan State University with a Master's degree in law. He completed his post graduate education at the Public Administration Academy before undertaking his military service.
