= Police Guard =

Police Guard of the Republic of Armenia
- Armenian: ҚՀայաստանի Հանրապետության Ոստիկանության գվարդիան
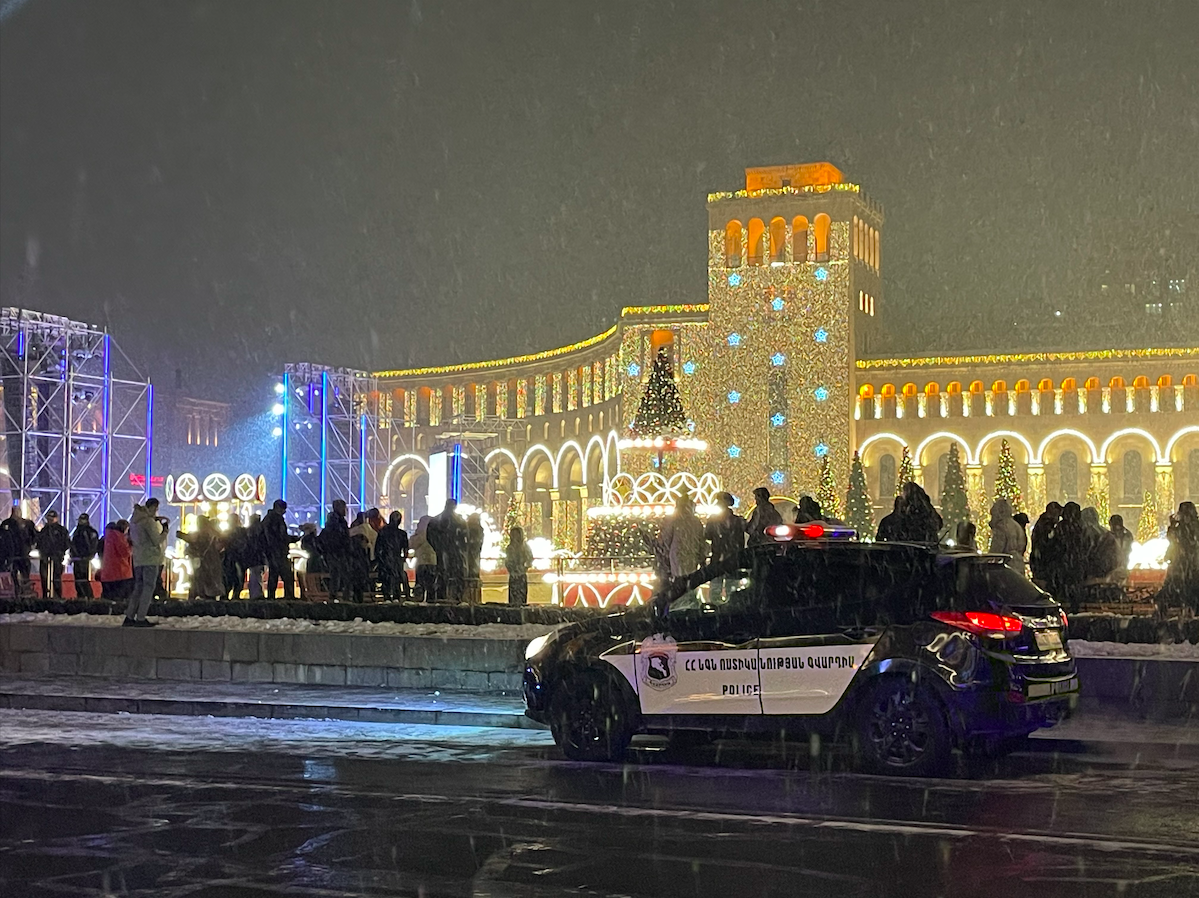
- Police Guard vehicle in 2025.
- Active: 10 January 1992 (Internal Troops); 1 November 2025 (Police Guard)
- Country: Armenia
- Branch: Ministry of Internal Affairs
- Type: Gendarmerie
- Part of: Police of Armenia
- Headquarters: Yerevan
- Anniversaries: 16 April (Police Officer's Day)
- Engagements: Four-Day War; Second Nagorno-Karabakh War; First Nagorno-Karabakh War

Insignia
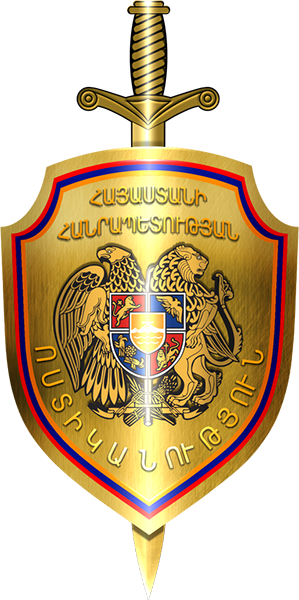
- Emblem of the Police of Armenia

The Police Guard (Armenian: Ոստիկանության գվարդիան, romanized: Vostikanut’yan Gvardia) is a branch of the Police of Armenia that serves as the country's gendarmerie. It is based on the former Armenian Internal Troops and the Soviet Internal Troops.

== Mandate ==
The unit is tasked with Protecting facilities of strategic importance. Supporting law-enforcement bodies conducting criminal proceedings. Maintenance of public order, public security service. Preliminary training of conscripts, and training of non-commissioned officers. The Internal Troops had a helicopter (aviation) unit, which, being provided with appropriate helicopters, performed various transportation services during combat operations.

== History ==
=== Origins ===
On 21 June 1992, the Internal Troops of the Ministry of Internal Affairs were formed by decree of Levon Ter-Petrosyan. The day of formation of the police troops is celebrated every year, on 21 June. In February 1999, the Deputy Minister of the Interior and Commander of the Internal Troops, Major General Artsrun Makarian, was found shot dead. On 14 December 2004, the Internal Troops were renamed to the Police Troops (Armenian: ոստիկանության զորքեր, romanized: Vostikanut’yan Zork’er). In 2009, there was a transition from conscription to contract service. In 2013 the International Institute for Strategic Studies attributed the force with four paramilitary brigades, 55 AIFV (including 45 BMP-1), 150 wheeled armoured personnel carriers, 100 transportation and cargo trucks.

=== Nagorno-Karabakh Conflict ===
It took part in the Four-Day War and the Second Nagorno-Karabakh War. During the latter war, sixty-five policemen were killed and six were considered missing. About 3,000 officers from the police troops went to the battlefront in shifts and took part in battles for Karvachar, Haterk, Jrakan, Berdzor and Shushi-Lisagor road. In 2018, it was deployed to the Armenia–Azerbaijan border. It also took part in the First Nagorno-Karabakh War.

=== Reforms and modern Police Guard ===
Legislation for Guard began appearing in the National Assembly of Armenia in the summer of 2022. In a ceremony on 1 November 2025, the Police Guard was officially created. Prime Minister Nikol Pashinyan referred to it as “a new page” in domestic security reform and promising a “qualitatively new service” for citizens and personnel alike. It consolidated the Police Troops, as well as the General Department of State Protection of Police, and accompanying police battalions.

== Organization ==
- 1033rd Military Unit

== Commanders ==
- Major General Artsrun Makarian (? - February 1999)
- Major General Hayk Babayan (November 2020 - Present)

== See also ==
- Internal Troops of Azerbaijan
- Internal Troops of Georgia
