= Vagharshak Harutiunyan =

Armenian general (born 1956)

- Վաղարշակ Հարությունյան
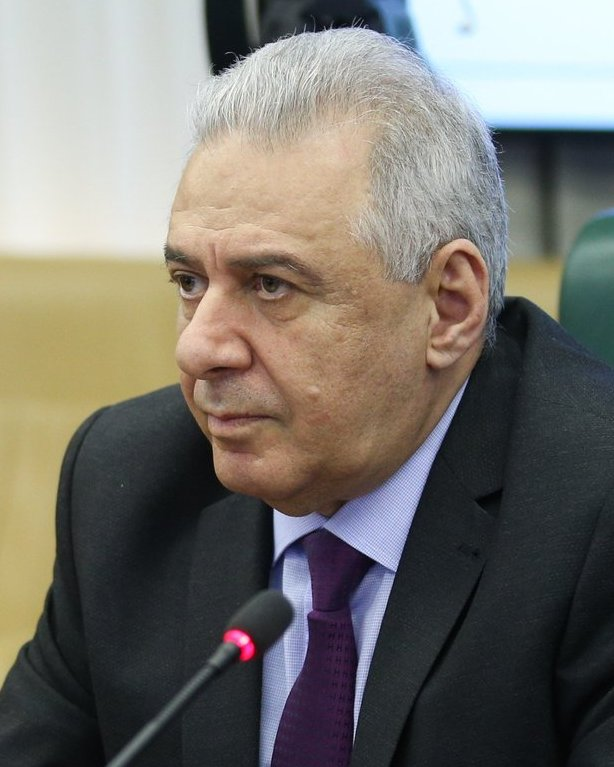
- Harutiunyan in 2022

Ambassador of Armenia to Russia
- In office 5 January 2022 – 14 August 2024
- Preceded by: Vardan Toghanyan
- Succeeded by: Gurgen Arsenyan

Minister of Defence
- In office 20 November 2020 – 3 August 2021
- President: Armen Sarkissian
- Prime Minister: Nikol Pashinyan
- Preceded by: David Tonoyan
- Succeeded by: Arshak Karapetyan
- In office 11 June 1999 – 20 May 2000
- President: Robert Kocharyan
- Preceded by: Vazgen Sargsyan
- Succeeded by: Serzh Sargsyan

Deputy Minister of Internal Affairs
- In office 1991–1992
- President: Levon Ter-Petrosyan

Personal details
- Born: 28 April 1956 (age 70) Akhalkalaki, Georgian SSR, Soviet Union
- Party: Hanrapetutyun Party
- Other political affiliations: Reformist Party
- Education: Soviet Union General Staff Academy

Military service
- Allegiance: USSR; Armenia
- Branch/service: Soviet Navy; Armed Forces of Armenia
- Years of service: 1974–2002; 2019–2021
- Rank: Lieutenant general
- Battles/wars: Soviet–Afghan War; First Nagorno-Karabakh War

Vagharshak Varnazi Harutiunyan (Armenian: Վաղարշակ Վառնազի Հարությունյան; born 28 April 1956) is an Armenian military figure and politician. He previously served as the Defence Minister of Armenia from 1999 to 2000 and again from 2020 to 2021, and also as an Ambassador of Armenia to Russia from 2022 to 2024.

== Early life ==
Harutiunyan was born in Akhalkalaki, Georgian SSR (now Georgia), a region with a large Armenian population.

== Military career ==
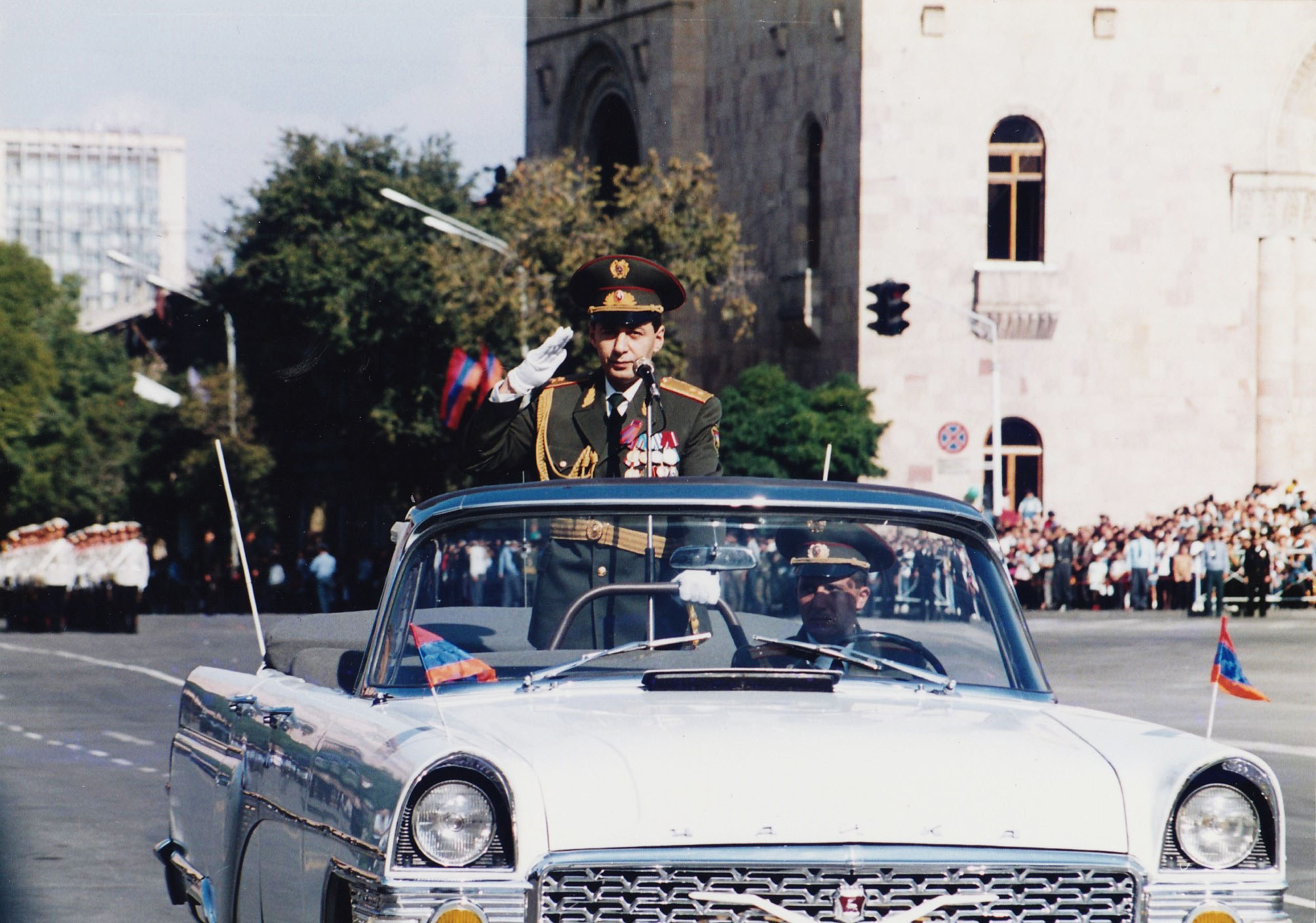
Harutiunyan at the Armenian Independence Day military parade in 1999.

=== Soviet Army and CIS service ===
He graduated from the Caspian Higher Naval School in 1978. From 1978 to 1989, he fought in the Soviet–Afghan War. Harutiunyan than graduated from the Grechko Naval Academy and the Military Academy of the General Staff of the Armed Forces of the Soviet Union in 1991.

He switched allegiance to Armenia prior to the fall of the Soviet Union. Harutiunyan was named Deputy Minister of Internal Affairs and Deputy Chairman of the Defence Committee of Armenia in 1991, in the middle of the First Nagorno-Karabakh War. In 1992, he became the Deputy Chief of Staff of the High Command of the Armed Forces of the Commonwealth of Independent States. Harutiunyan was chosen as the representative of the Armenian Armed Forces at the CIS in 1994. In 1994, he received the military rank of Major General.

=== First term as defence minister (1999–2000) ===
In 1996, he received the military rank of Lieutenant General. In 1999, Harutiunyan returned to Armenia to replace Vazgen Sargsyan as Defence Minister of Armenia on 11 June 1999 after Sargsyan was elected Prime Minister. Harutiunyan joined Sargsyan and Head of the Government Staff Shahen Karamanukyan in the meeting of the Commonwealth of Independent States (CIS) heads of government in Yalta, Ukraine on 7 October 1999. In February 2000, he discussed a plan for cooperation between Armenia and Belarus with his Belarusian counterpart, Aleksandr Chumakov during his visit to Minsk to discuss Armenian use of Belarusian military plants for upgrading Armenian military equipment. He left the post of defence minister on 20 May 2000. On 22 July 2002, Harutiunyan was stripped of his military rank of lieutenant general by order of President of Armenia Robert Kocharyan.

== Career (2000-2020) ==
On 23 July 2002, Harutiunyan joined the opposition Hanrapetutyun Party, led by Aram Sargsyan, the brother of Vazgen Sargsyan. In 2005, together with Albert Bazeyan, he founded the National Revival Party. In 2007 the party ceased its activities and merged with the Ramkavar Azatakan Party, although Harutyunyan opposed this. In 2016, there were rumors about his possible appointment to the post of Secretary General of the Collective Security Treaty Organization. In 2019, his military rank of lieutenant general was restored. In August 2020, he was appointed Chief Military Advisor to the Prime Minister of Armenia.

== Second term as defence minister (2020-2021) ==
Harutiunyan was appointed as defence minister by Prime Minister Nikol Pashinyan and President Armen Sarksyan on 20 November 2020, following the resignation of David Tonoyan. His appointment were among a number of changes in the Second Pashinyan government following the Nagorno-Karabakh ceasefire agreement that ended the Second Nagorno-Karabakh War. In his appointment ceremony, he thanked the Prime Minister for his confidence, stating he hopes his leadership will "preserve the positive we had in the Army" and "assess the objective and subjective reasons within a short period of time and submit a new package of reforms". The day after his appointment, he met with his Russian counterpart Sergei Shoigu, where they discussed the Russian peacekeeping force in Nagorno-Karabakh.

== Post-government ==
He was appointed by Pashinyan as the Ambassador of Armenia to Russia on 5 January 2022, succeeding Vardan Toghanyan. His term has been marked by a rapidly deteriorating bilateral relationship between the two countries, reaching a climax after the start of renewed fighting between Armenia and Azerbaijan on 13 September 2022. He served until 14 August 2024, being succeeded by Gurgen Arsenyan. During the 2026 Armenian parliamentary election, he was nominated by the Reformist Party as their candidate for the post of Prime Minister of Armenia.

== Awards ==
- Nominal weapon (gifts from former Minister of Defence Vazgen Sargsyan and former Russian Minister of Defence Pavel Grachev)
- Order “For Merit to the Fatherland”, 2nd class (September 17, 2016)
- Order of Friendship (September 26, 2024, Russia)
- Movses Khorenatsi Medal
- Jubilee Medal "300 Years of the Russian Navy"
- Medal "In Commemoration of the 850th Anniversary of Moscow"
- Jubilee Medal "60 Years of the Armed Forces of the USSR"
- Jubilee Medal "70 Years of the Armed Forces of the USSR"
- Medal "For Impeccable Service", 1st class
- Medal "For Impeccable Service", 2nd class
- Medal "For Impeccable Service", 3rd class
- Other awards of Russia, the USSR, Belarus, Bulgaria, Tajikistan and a number of other countries.

== Personal life ==
He is married. Outside of Armenian, he speaks Russian, and English.

== See also ==
- Embassy of Armenia to Russia

Political offices
Preceded by Vazgen Sargsyan	Defence Minister of Armenia; 1999–2000	Succeeded by Serzh Sargsyan
Preceded by David Tonoyan	Defence Minister of Armenia; 2020–2021	Succeeded by Arshak Karapetyan
