= Ministry of Emergency Situations (Armenia) =

Government ministry of Armenia

- Արտակարգ իրավիճակների նախարարություն
- Emblem of the Ministry of Emergency of Armenia

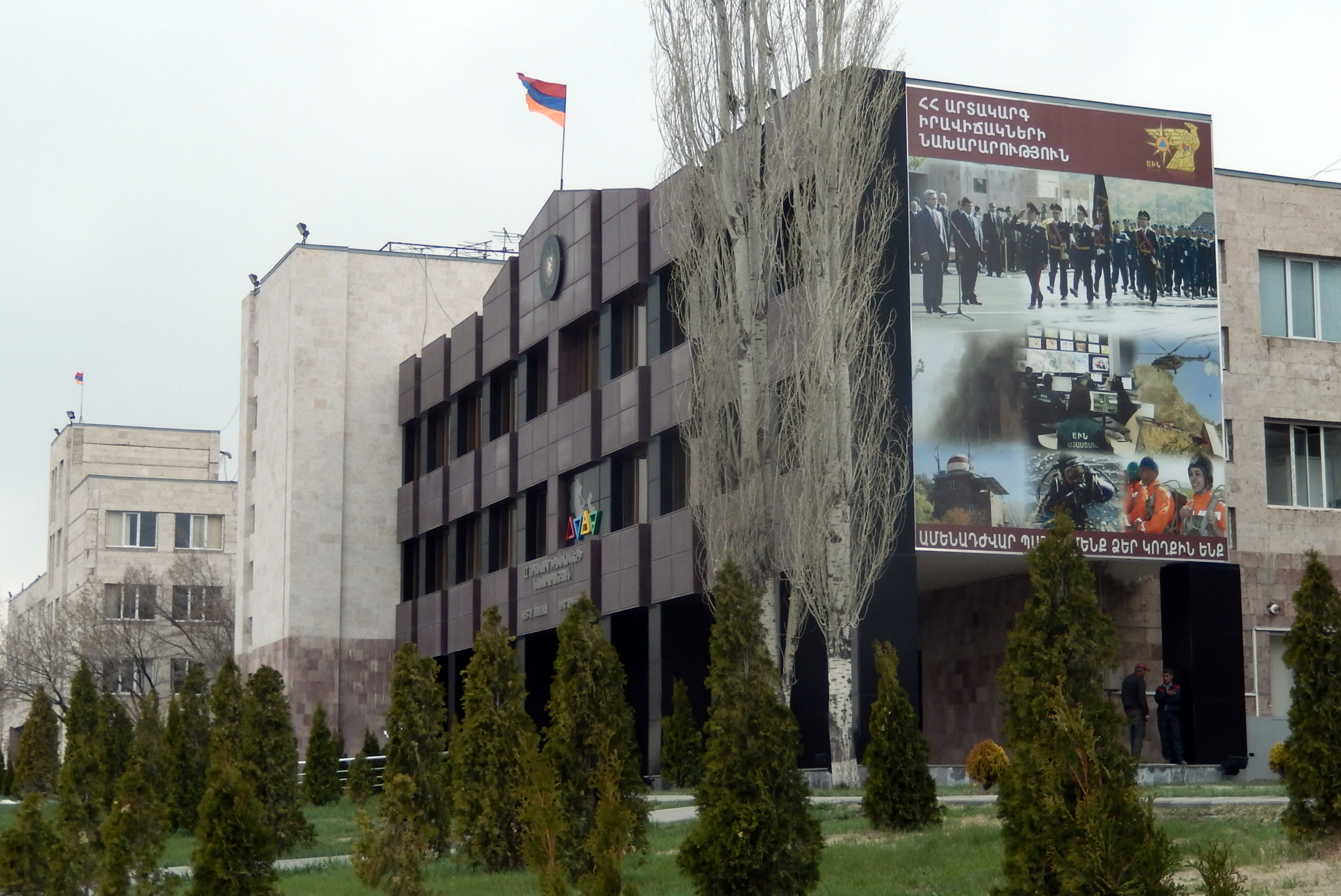

Agency overview
- Formed: 21 April 2008
- Dissolved: 30 June 2023
- Jurisdiction: Government of Armenia
- Headquarters: 109 Anastas Mikoyan Street, Davtashen District, Yerevan
- Minister responsible: Armen Pambukhchyan, Minister of Emergency Situations
- Website: www.mes.am

The Ministry of Emergency Situations of Armenia (MES) (Armenian: Հայաստանի արտակարգ իրավիճակների նախարարություն) was a government agency overseeing the civil emergency services in Armenia. The ministry was formed by presidential decree on 21 April 2008.

== History ==
The ministry was preceded by the Headquarters of the Civil Defense, which had operated in the Armenian SSR since 1961. The 1988 Armenian earthquake (also commonly known as the Spitak Earthquake) revealed many issues related to the civil defense system in Soviet Armenia and became the main force behind the restructuring of the Emergency Management Department of the Government of Armenia. Following the Declaration of State Sovereignty of Armenia by the Supreme Council of Armenia, the Emergency Department was established with Stepan Badalyan its first head. On September 4, 1997, a rescue rapid reaction unit was created, with its main tasks being to perform rescue operations in the disaster zone, as well as rendering professional assistance to the population in case of emergency incidents in the shortest possible time. In 1994, Armenia became a full member of the International Civil Defence Organization. In December 2005, the Emergency Management Department was renamed to the Rescue Service of the Ministry of Territorial Administration of the Republic of Armenia.

Newly elected Armenian President Serzh Sargsyan restructured the service on 21 April 2008 as the Ministry of Emergency Situations, with Mher Shahgeldyan being the first Minister of Emergency Situations. The ministry was merged with the Ministry of Territorial Administration in December 2014 only to become an independent agency two years later. With the legislative amendments adopted by the National Assembly on December 16, 2022, the functions of the Ministry of Emergency Situations were transferred to the newly established Ministry of Internal Affairs from June 30, 2023.

== Mission and structure ==
The Ministry of Emergency Situations of Armenia coordinates its services with the law of the Republic of Armenia in the sphere of citizenship and protection of citizens in the context of emergency situations. It serves to evacuate Armenian citizens during natural disasters and accidents.

The ministry was composed of 5 main agencies:

- Rescue Service
- National Seismic Protection Service
- Armgosgidromet
- State Reserves Agency
- National Center for Technical Security

=== Rescue Service ===
The Rescue Service was an auxiliary to the Armed Forces of Armenia. The ministry utilizes Stepanavan Airport in Lori Province to support the rescue services by fighting wildfires. Fire-fighting aircraft based there includes Beriev Be-200 aircraft, which was in the process of being purchased by the Russian government.

=== National Seismic Protection Service ===
The National Seismic Protection Service was engaged in seismic risk assessment as well as earthquake impact assessment. It has offices in Gyumri, Yerevan, Kapan, and Stepanakert. The service operates seismic stations at the Metsamor Nuclear Power Plant, the only nuclear power plant in the South Caucasus.

=== Armgosgidromet ===
The Service of the Hydrometeorology and Active Influence on Atmospheric Phenomena (SNCO) or Armgosgidromet was the national meteorological service of Armenia, responsible for gathering hydrometeorological information.

=== State Reserves Agency ===
The State Reserves Agency of the Ministry of Emergency Situations was the legal successor of Armenian SSR branch of the Soviet Material Reserves State Committee (now the Federal Agency for State Reserves). It was founded in 1992 when by government decision the Armenian branch was reformed into State Reserves Administration. In 2002, it began operating under the Ministry of Finance. It moved in 2005 under the structure of the Ministry of Territorial Administration before becoming part of MES in 2008.

=== National Center for Technical Security ===
The National Center of Technical Security was a non-commercial organization founded on 29 December 2005.

== Symbols ==
=== Medals ===
The ministry provides 9 awards for exceptional employees of the ministry.

- Medal "Cross of Glory Noah"
- Medal "For the Commonwealth in the Name of Salvation"
- Medal "For impeccable service"
- Medal "The best fireman-rescuer"
- Medal "The brave rescuer"
- Medal "Honored Employee of the Ministry of Emergency Situations of the Republic of Armenia"
- Medal "Prevention, assistance, rescue"
- Medal "Veteran of the Ministry of Emergency Situations of the Republic of Armenia"
- Badge "First class rescuer"

=== Music ===
Like the Armenian Army and the Police of Armenia, the rescue service of the ministry has a 48-member, ceremonial brass band (Poghatin Nvagaxumb) which works during public ceremonies involving the ministry. It was led by Colonel Manvel Utujyan, who previously served in the band of the Internal Troops. The brass band was founded in 2010 by Minister Armen Yeritsyan.

== List of ministers ==
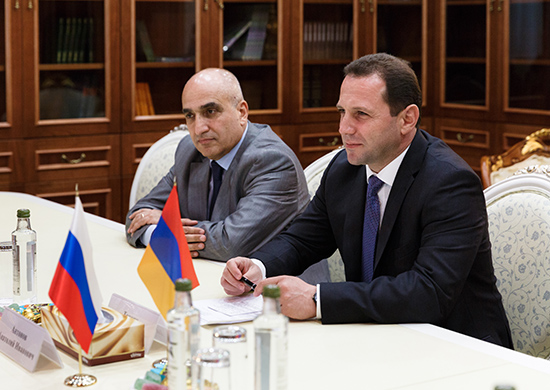
Former minister David Tonoyan.

=== 1991–2008 ===
- Major General Vyacheslav Harutyunyan (July 1997 – February 2001)
- Major General Hmayak Aroyan (February 2001 – March 2004)
- Major General Edik Barseghyan (March 2004 – 21 April 2008)

=== 2008–2023 ===
- Mher Shahgeldyan (21 April 2008 – March 2010)
- Armen Yeritsyan (March 2010 – 13 December 2016) (Died in office)
- David Tonoyan (6 February 2017 – 10 May 2018)
- Hrachya Rostomyan (10 May 2018 – 3 October 2018)
- Vacant (3 – 4 October 2018)
- Feliks Tsolakyan (4 October 2018 – 20 November 2020)
- Andranik Piloyan (20 November 2020 - 1 April 2022)
- Armen Pambukhchyan (12 April 2022 – 30 June 2023t)

== See also ==
- Government of Armenia
- State Service of Emergency Situations
- Ministry of Emergency Situations (disambiguation)
