= Ministry of Internal Affairs (Armenia) =

Government ministry of Armenia

Ministry of Internal Affairs of the Republic of Armenia
- Ներքին գործերի նախարարություն Nerk’in gortseri nakhararut’yun

Agency overview
- Formed: 9 January 2023
- Preceding agency: Ministry of Internal Affairs of the Armenian SSR
- Jurisdiction: Government of Armenia
- Headquarters: Yerevan
- Minister responsible: Arpine Sargsyan, Minister of Internal Affairs
- Agency executive: David Hambaryan, Deputy Minister; Aram Hovhannisyan, Deputy Minister; Kamo Tsutsulyan, Deputy Minister; Ara Fidanyan, Secretary-General
- Child agencies: Police of Armenia; Rescue Service of Armenia; Migration and Citizenship Service
- Website: mia.gov.am

The Ministry of Internal Affairs (Armenian: Ներքին գործերի նախարարություն, romanized: Nerk’in gortseri nakhararut’yun) is the Armenian government ministry which oversees the Police of Armenia, the Migration and Citizenship Service, and the Rescue Service. The Ministry is headed by the Minister of Internal Affairs, appointed by the decree of the Prime Minister of Armenia. The current minister is Arpine Sargsyan since November 2024.

== History ==
=== First ministry ===
On 21 June 1992, President Levon Ter-Petrosyan created the Ministry of Internal Affairs from the former Soviet Armenian Interior Ministry and the Soviet Internal Troops. It operated until December 2002, when the ministry was reorganized into the Police of Armenia.

=== Reformation ===
In 2019, the Ministry of Justice recommended the re-establishment of the ministry as part of the government's three-year strategy of police reforms. In 2021, Prime Minister Nikol Pashinyan announced plans to recreate the Interior Ministry.

On 24 November 2022, during a regular Cabinet meeting chaired by Pashinyan a draft law on the reestablishment of the Ministry of Internal Affairs was adopted, with the Ministry of Emergency Situations ceasing its activities according to the transition schedule. In December, the National Assembly of Armenia approved a government proposal to set up the ministry. Pashinyan noted that the purpose of the creation of the interior ministry was aimed at “increasing the effectiveness of the work of the police” and the move was supported by members of parliament, one of whom said that it would increase “democratic oversight” of the police.

== Agencies under the MIA ==
=== Police ===
The Police of Armenia is the national police of Armenia. It descends from the first police service of Armenia, formed in 1918, under the Ministry of Internal Affairs of the First Republic of Armenia. On April 21, 1920, a Militia was formed in Yerevan based on the Soviet model.

=== Rescue Service ===
The Rescue Service was an auxiliary to the Armed Forces of Armenia and was formerly under the Ministry of Emergency Situations. The ministry utilizes Stepanavan Airport in Lori Province to support the rescue services by fighting wildfires. Fire-fighting aircraft based there includes Beriev Be-200 aircraft, which was in the process of being purchased by the Russian government.

=== Migration and Citizenship Service ===
The Migration and Citizenship Service is the government agency that regulates the migration system of Turkmenistan, implements state policy in the field of migration. In December 1990, the Committee on Refugee Issues under the Council of Ministers was established, based on the State Committee for the Reception and Resettlement of Armenians Repatriating from the Armenian SSR. In 2016, the Service became part of the Ministry of Territorial Administration and Development. Since 2023, the Migration and Citizenship Service has been operating under the Ministry of Internal Affairs.

== Ministry Structure ==
- Minister's Office
- Structural Divisions
  - Department of Strategic Planning, Policy Development and Monitoring
  - Service Quality Control Department
  - Disaster and Emergency Management Department
  - Internal Security and Anti-Corruption Department
  - Legal Department
  - Department of Registration and Examination Services, Permits and Licensing
- Supporting Professional Divisions
  - Human Resources Management Department
  - International Cooperation Department
  - Public Communication and Outreach Department
  - Finance and Budget Department
  - Economic Department
  - Document Management Department
  - Information Technology and Communication Department
  - Mobilization and Civil Defense Department

== See also ==
- Law enforcement in Armenia
- Ministry of Internal Affairs (Artsakh)
