= Office of the President of Armenia =

- Հայաստանի նախագահի գրասենյակ (Armenian)
- Coat of arms of Armenia

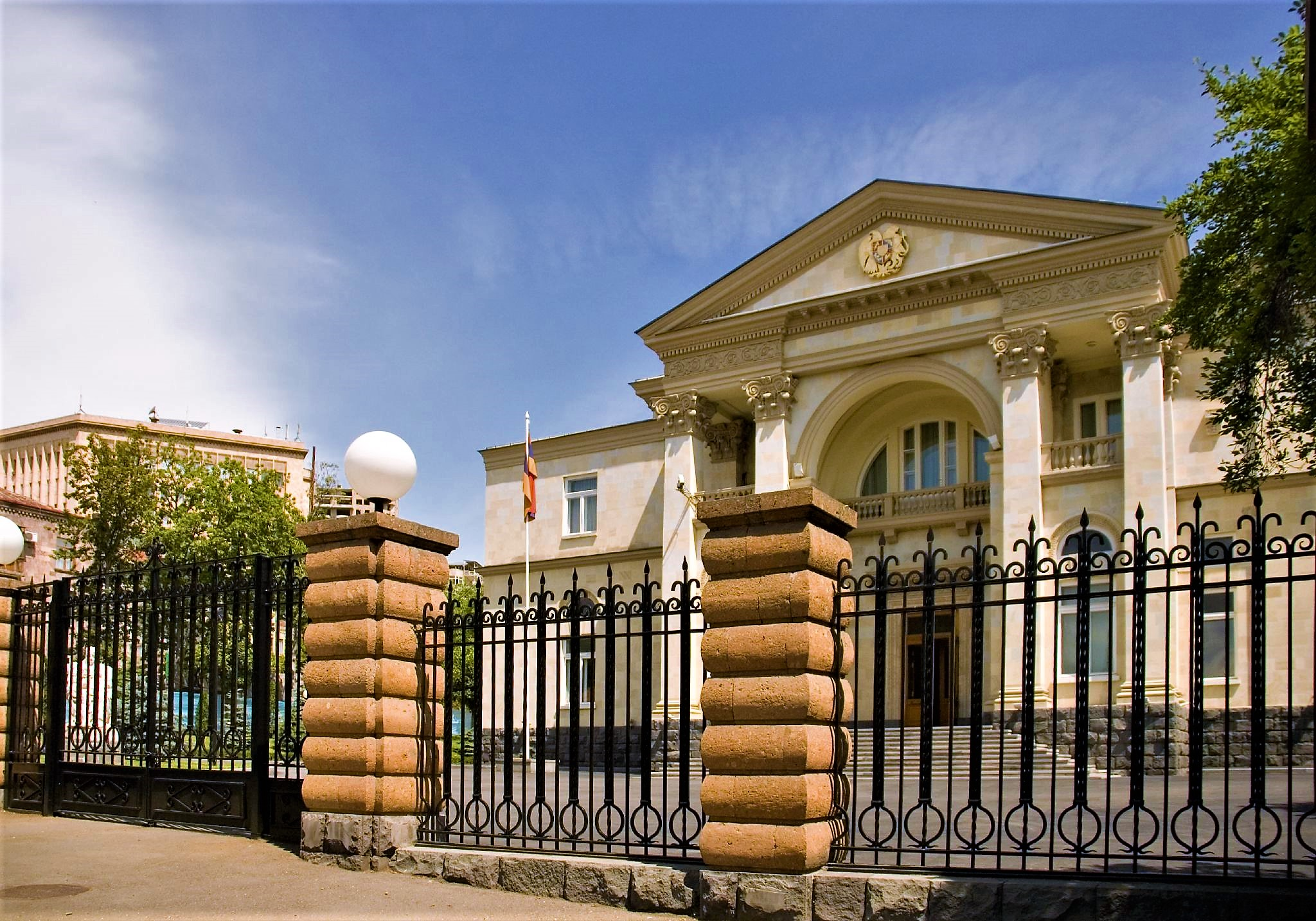
- President's Residence, Yerevan

Agency overview
- Formed: 1994
- Jurisdiction: Government of Armenia
- Headquarters: President's Residence, Yerevan, Armenia
- Employees: 155 (max at 275)
- Minister responsible: Vahagn Khachaturyan, President of Armenia
- Agency executive: Khachatur Poghosyan, Chief of Staff to the President
- Key documents: Part 1, Article 139, Constitution of Armenia; Law "On Public Service"
- Website: president.am

The Office of the President of Armenia (Armenian: Հայաստանի նախագահի գրասենյակ, romanized: Hayastani nakhagahi grasenyak) is the national-level agency of the Republic of Armenia that support the work of the President of Armenia. Its operation is governed by the Part 1 of Article 139 of the Constitution of Armenia and the Law "On Public Service".

== Leading personnel ==
Title	Incumbent
Chief of Staff	Khachatur Poghosyan
Deputy Chiefs of Staff	Armen Markosyan
Advisers to the President	Tatevik Karapetyan
Advisers to the President	Robert Khachatryan
Assistants to the President	Arman Abrahamyan
Aides to the President	Inga Gabrielyan

== Structure ==
- Department of External Relations and Protocol
- Department of Presidential Initiatives
  - Department of Strategic Initiatives and Analysis
- Legal Department
  - Division on Pardons and Citizenship
  - Division of Monitoring and Analysis
- Department of Public Relations
- Department of Human Resources and State Awards
  - Division of Human Resources
  - Division of Awards and Titles
- Finance Department
  - Accounting Division
  - Division of Procurement
- Secretariat
  - Division of General Affairs
  - Division of Protocol
  - Department of Inquiries and Letters
- Executive Secretariat of the President
- First Desk
- Internal Audit Department
- Property Management Office
  - Division of Information Technology
  - Housekeeping Department
  - Service Division
- Department Responsible for Anti-Corruption Programs
  - Substitute Officer Responsible for Anti-Corruption Programs
- Department Responsible for Internal and External Announcements
- Department Responsible for the Freedom of Information

== Lists of officials ==
=== Chief of Staff to the President ===
The Chief of Staff to the President is the title of the head of the office. (Note: The title has also been referred to in previous years as the Head of the Presidential Administration.)

- Shahen Karamanukyan (1994 – 10 April 1998)
- Aleksan Harutyunyan (10 April 1998 — 1 November 1999)
- Serzh Sargsyan (1 November 1999 – 2000)
- Artashes Tumanyan (2000 – 2006)
- Armen Gevorgyan (2006 – 21 April 2008)
- Hovik Abrahamyan (21 April 2008 – 5 September 2008)
- Karen Karapetyan (5 September 2008 – October 2011)
- Vigen Sargsyan (October 2011 – 3 October 2016)
- Armen Gevorgyan (3 October 2016 – 2 November 2018)
- Emil Tarasyan (2 November 2018 – 24 January 2022)
- David Arakelyan (2 February 2022 – February 2023)
- Khachatur Poghosyan (14 August 2026 – Present)

=== Press Secretaries ===
The following have served as Press Secretary to the President:

- Ruben Shugaryan (1992 – 1993)
- Aram Abrahamyan (1993 – 1995)
- Levon Zurabyan (1995 – 1995)
- Kasia Abgaryan (1998 – 1999)
- Vahe Gabrielyan (1999 – 2003)
- Ashot Kocharyan (2003 – 2005)
- Viktor Soghomonyan (2005 – 2008)
- Samvel Farmanyan (2008 – 2010)
- Armen Arzumanyan (2010 – 2013)
- Arman Saghatelyan (2013 – 2015)
- Vladimir Hakobyan (since 18 July 2015)

== See also ==
- Prime Minister's Office (Armenia)
- Presidential Administration of Azerbaijan
- Presidential Administration of Georgia
