= Minister of Defence (Armenia) =

Member of the Government of Armenia

- Հայաստանի պաշտպանության նախարար
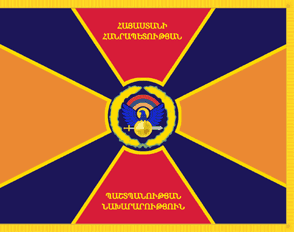
- Flag of the Ministry of Defense

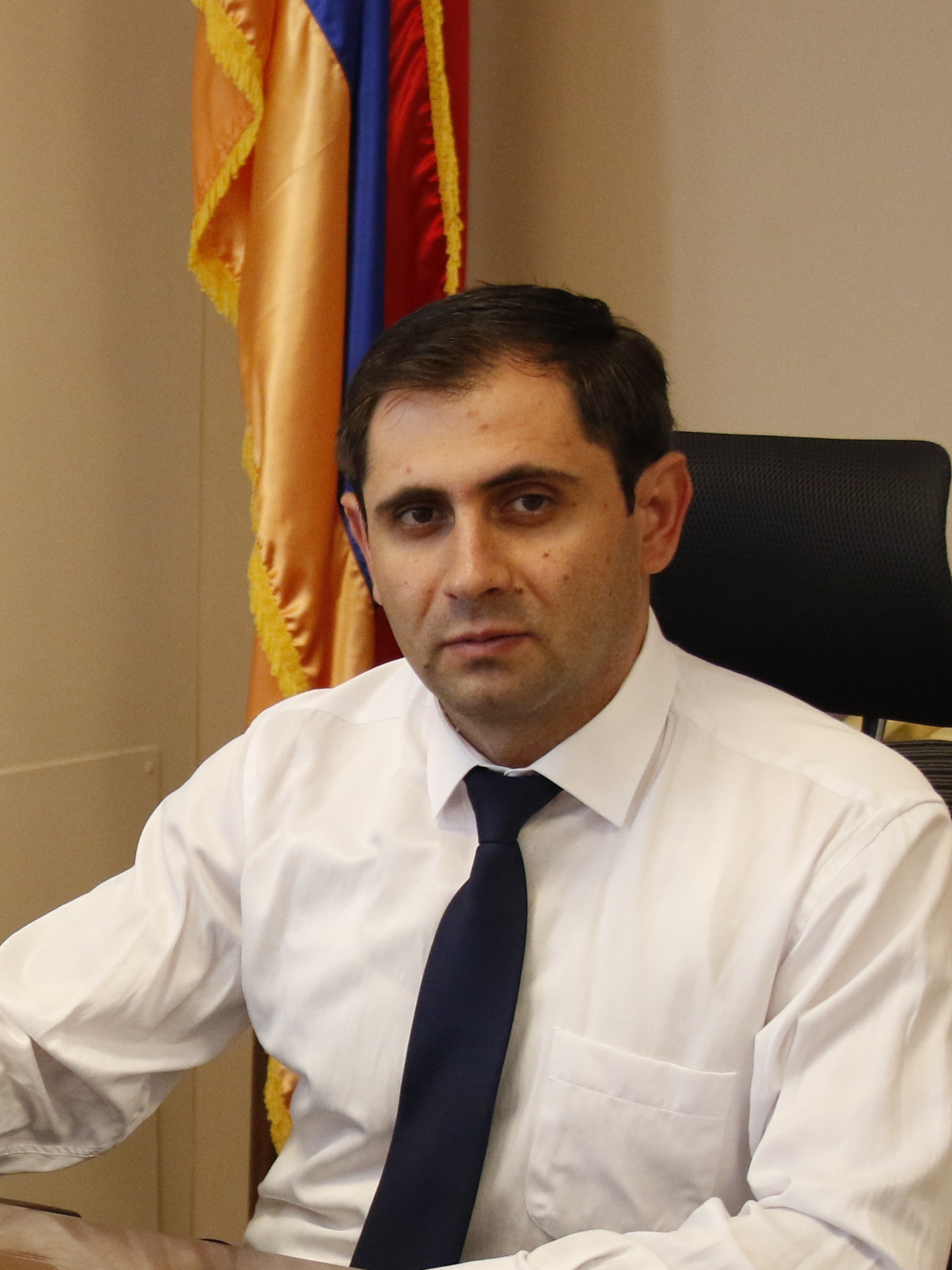
- Incumbent; Suren Papikyan since 15 November 2021
- Ministry of Defence
- Style: Mr/Madam Minister
- Member of: Cabinet; Security Council
- Reports to: Prime Minister of Armenia
- Seat: Yerevan, Armenia
- Nominator: Prime Minister of Armenia
- Appointer: President of Armenia
- Term length: None
- Constituting instrument: Constitution of Armenia
- Formation: 1992
- First holder: Vazgen Sargsyan
- Deputy: Chief of the General Staff
- Website: mil.am/en

The defence minister of Armenia (Armenian: Հայաստանի Հանրապետության պաշտպանության նախարար, romanized: Hayastani Hanrapetut’yan pashtpanut’yan nakharar) is the head of the country's Ministry of Defence, who is charged with the political leadership of the Armed Forces of Armenia. The position was originally created in 1918 and was re-established in January 1992 following Armenia's independence from the USSR, and is currently headed by Suren Papikyan. From 1993 to 1995, there was a concurrent position called the state minister for defence held by Vazgen Sargsyan.

== List of ministers ==
=== First Republic of Armenia (1918–1920) ===
No.	Portrait	Minister of Defence	Took office	Left office	Time in office	Party
1	Hovhannes Hakhverdyan	Hovhannes Hakhverdyan (1873–1931)	30 June 1918	27 March 1919	270 days	Independent
2	Christophor Araratov	Christophor Araratov (1876–1937)	27 March 1919	5 May 1920	1 year, 39 days	Independent
3	Rouben Ter Minassian	Rouben Ter Minassian (1882–1951)	5 May 1920	24 November 1920	203 days	ARF
4	Drastamat Kanayan	Drastamat Kanayan (1884–1956)	24 November 1920	2 December 1920	8 days	ARF

=== Armenian SSR (1920–1991) ===
No.	Portrait	People's Commissar of the Army and Navy of the Armenian SSR	Took office	Left office	Time in office	Party
5	Avis Nurijanyan	Avis Nurijanyan (1896–1938)	December 1920	May 1921	6 months	CPSU
6	Alexander Miasnikian	Alexander Miasnikian (1886–1925)	May 1921	1922	1 year	CPSU
7	Hayk Bzhishkyan	Hayk Bzhishkyan (1887–1937)	1922	1922	0 year	CPSU

=== Third Armenian Republic (1991–present) ===
No.	Portrait	Minister of Defence	Took office	Left office	Time in office	Party
8	Vazgen Sargsyan	Vazgen Sargsyan (1959–1999)	5 December 1991	20 October 1992	320 days	HHSh
9	Vazgen Manukyan	Vazgen Manukyan (born 1946)	20 October 1992	21 August 1993	305 days	NDU
10	Serzh Sargsyan	Serzh Sargsyan (born 1954)	21 August 1993	17 May 1995	1 year, 269 days	HHSh
(8)	Vazgen Sargsyan	Vazgen Sargsyan (1959–1999)	25 July 1995	11 June 1999	3 years, 321 days	Republican
11	Vagharshak Harutiunyan	Vagharshak Harutiunyan (born 1956)	11 June 1999	20 May 2000	344 days	Independent
(10)	Serzh Sargsyan	Serzh Sargsyan (born 1954)	20 May 2000	26 March 2007	6 years, 310 days	Republican
12	Mikael Harutyunyan	Mikael Harutyunyan (born 1946)	4 April 2007	14 April 2008	1 year, 10 days	Independent
13	Seyran Ohanyan	Seyran Ohanyan (born 1962)	14 April 2008	3 October 2016	8 years, 172 days	Independent
14	Vigen Sargsyan	Vigen Sargsyan (born 1975)	3 October 2016	12 May 2018	1 year, 221 days	Republican
15	David Tonoyan	David Tonoyan (born 1967)	12 May 2018	20 November 2020	2 years, 192 days	Independent
(11)	Vagharshak Harutiunyan	Vagharshak Harutiunyan (born 1956)	20 November 2020	3 August 2021	256 days	Independent
16	Arshak Karapetyan	Arshak Karapetyan (born 1967)	3 August 2021	15 November 2021	104 days	Independent
17	Suren Papikyan	Suren Papikyan (born 1986)	15 November 2021	Incumbent	4 years, 296 days	Civil Contract

== See also ==
- Ministry of Defence of Armenia
- Armed Forces of Armenia
