= Vigen Sargsyan =

Armenian politician

- Վիգեն Սարգսյան
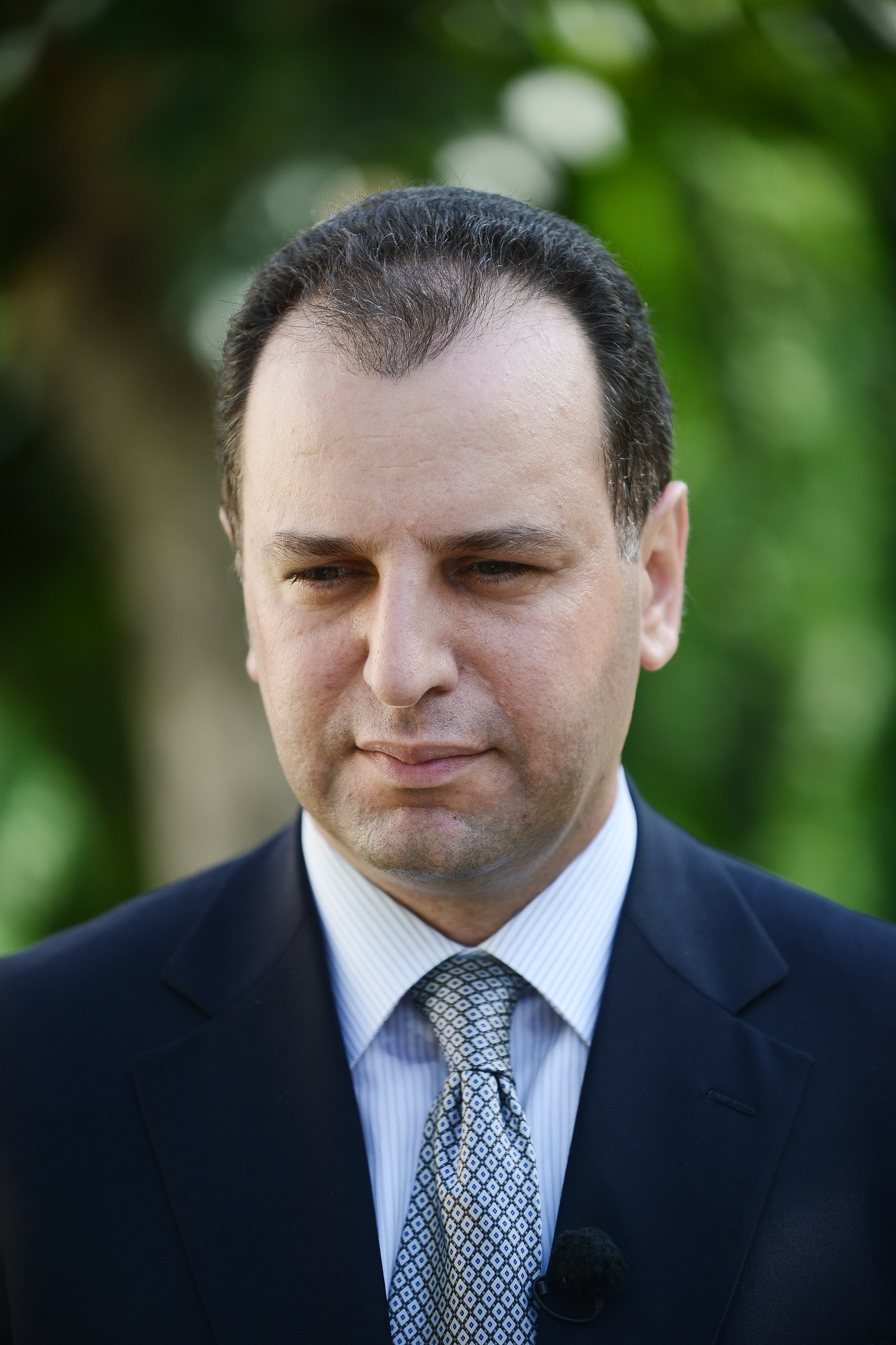

Defence Minister of Armenia
- In office 3 October 2016 – 8 May 2018
- President: Serzh Sargsyan; Armen Sarkissian
- Prime Minister: Karen Karapetyan; Serzh Sargsyan
- Preceded by: Seyran Ohanyan
- Succeeded by: David Tonoyan

Personal details
- Born: 10 May 1975 (age 51) Yerevan, Armenian SSR, Soviet Union
- Party: Republican Party of Armenia

Vigen Sargsyan (Armenian: Վիգեն Ալեքսանդրի Սարգսյան; born 10 May 1975) is an Armenian politician who served as the Defence Minister of Armenia from October 2016 until May 2018 and as the Chief of Presidential Administration from October 2011 to October 2016.

He is not related to either the former President of Armenia Serzh Sargsyan or the former Prime Minister Tigran Sargsyan. He left the office after the Velvet Revolution led by opposition politician Nikol Pashinyan, who became Armenia's new prime minister. After leaving public office, Sargsyan assumed the role of Executive Director of Luys Foundation, created in 2009, and turned it into a public policy think-tank. In 2019, Sargsyan joined Massachusetts Institute of Technology as a Sloan Fellow. He currently resides in the United States. He is wanted in Armenia on charges of abuse of power during his time as defence minister; Sargsyan rejects the charges as politically motivated.

== Biography ==
=== Early life and education ===
Vigen Sargsyan was born on 10 May 1975 in Yerevan into a family of medics. He graduated from the North-West Academy of Public Administration in Saint Petersburg in 1996, then graduated from Yerevan State University's Department of International Relations in 1999, earning a master's degree in "History of Diplomacy and International Relations". In 2000, he graduated from the Fletcher School of Law and Diplomacy at Tufts and Harvard Universities with a master's degree in law and diplomacy. Sargsyan holds an Executive MBA from Massachusetts Institute of Technology and is an Honorary Professor of the North-West Academy of Public Administration.

=== Political career ===
From 1995 to 1998, he served as an assistant and adviser to speakers of the National Assembly Babken Ararktsyan and Khosrov Harutyunyan. During the same period, he served as Executive Secretary of the national delegations to the Inter-Parliamentary Union, the Parliamentary Assembly of OSCE, and the CIS Inter-Parliamentary Assembly.

After returning from the Fletcher School of Law and Diplomacy, Sargsyan served in the Armenian Armed Forces from 2000 to 2003 as assistant to the Minister of Defence, then Serzh Sargsyan. He was an adjunct lecturer at the American University of Armenia from 2001 to 2011, teaching graduate course in the field of International Public Law, International Human Rights and International Relations. After finishing military service in 2003, Sargsyan served as an Assistant to the President of Armenia Robert Kocharyan, with portfolio in foreign and national security policy, as well as diaspora affairs. When Serzh Sargsyan was sworn in as President in April 2008, Vigen Sargsyan was offered to stay and continued public service. On 27 January 2009 the then-President Serzh Sargsyan promoted him to the position of Deputy Chief of Staff. Two years later, in October 2011, Sargsyan became Chief of Staff to the President of the Republic, the highest political appointee position in the country, which he held through 2016.

Since 2003, as Assistant to the President of Armenia, and later as Deputy Chief and Chief of Staff, he curated the work of Armenian diplomatic missions abroad. For over 15 years he has been in the narrow circle of Armenian politicians, directly participating in Nagorno Karabakh peace talks. Vigen Sargsyan has regularly expressed his confidence that the conflict shall be resolved based on compromises, but only when the right of people of Artsakh for self-determination is acknowledged and its execution is internationally guaranteed.

He was part of President Sargsyan’s team, when they launched the Armenia-Turkey dialogue in 2008, which became known as “football diplomacy”, as the two major summits occurred on the occasion of football games of national teams of Armenia and Turkey in Yerevan (Armenia) and Bursa (Turkey). The process culminated in signing of the Protocols in Geneva, Switzerland. Later, Turkey refused to ratify those documents. As part of the initiative, President Sargsyan’s administration initiated and implemented the “Pan-Armenian Tour”, through which President visited all major Armenian Diaspora centers and held town-hall meetings with representatives of the Armenian communities, facing their severe criticism for the attempts of rapprochement with Turkey.

As Assistant to the President of Armenia, Vigen Sargsyan actively participated in the development of the first National Security Strategy and Military Doctrine of the Republic of Armenia, which were adopted in 2007 and stayed intact until they were revisited in 2018, after the change of government in Armenia. As opposite to the new text, adopted in 2018, the first National Security Strategy, adopted by the Presidential Decree, contained a dedicated Chapter, called “Republic of Nagorno Karabakh,” and confirmed Armenia’s responsibility to protect the people of Artsakh.

=== Minister of defence ===
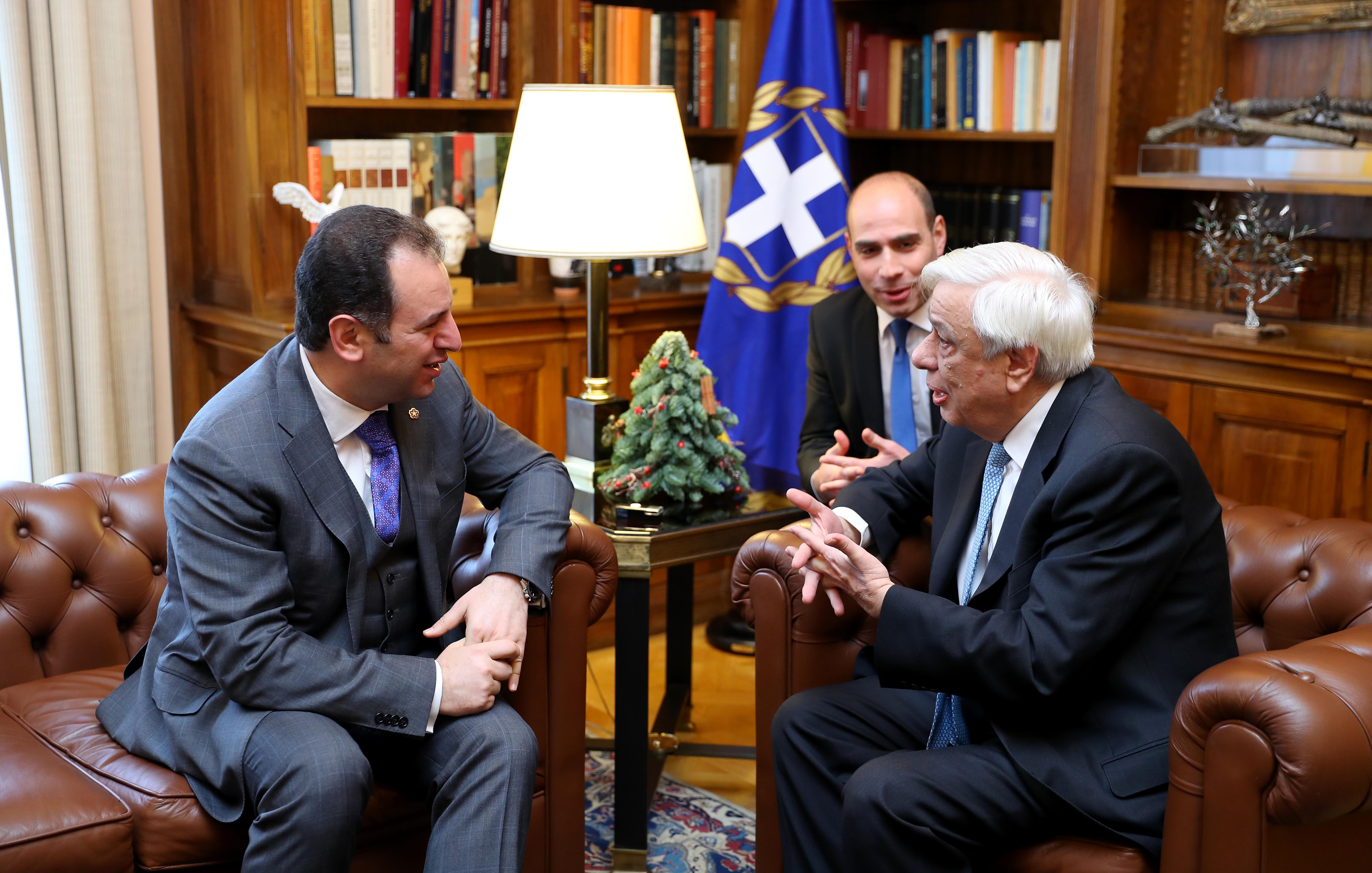
Sargsyan with President of Greece Prokopis Pavlopoulos in December 2016.

On 3 October 2016 Sargsyan was appointed Minister of Defence by President Serzh Sargsyan, succeeding Seyran Ohanyan. Sargsyan announced that his efforts as Defence Minister would be aimed at building the "nation-army" concept, which he described as the idea of assuring full democratic control over military in a country, where the Armed Forces are unproportionally big compared to the size of population. He stressed, that in a country with "such a high ratio of military to civilians and real-life military threats, 'nation-army' is not really a matter of a choice, it is about embracing the existing reality." He emphasized the importance of proper training and administration of the reserve, as the country faces real military challenges and that "all the governmental bodies, civilians and anybody else must precisely realize their role in the defense of the country." As part of the concept he launched a number of initiatives, aimed at offering more choices to the conscripts facing compulsory military services by creating hybrids between mandatory and professional service types. He launched programs of introduction of educational programs in the military units, aimed at giving conscripts professional skills and knowledge, particularly in IT field, to empower them for growth after demobilization. He has also launched a scientific research battalion for conscripts with advanced degrees in various scientific branches.

In March 2018, the Ministry of Defense published a document titled the "Seven Year Army Modernization Plan", which envisaged a number of reforms in the sphere of defence. He was reappointed to the same position by President Armen Sarkissian in 2018. The "nation-army" term, though frequently discussed during Sargsyan's tenure, fell out of use after he left the post in May 2018.

Sargsyan resigned on 8 May 2018, following the election of Nikol Pashinyan as the Prime Minister of Armenia. Sargsyan said that he would only continue to act as Defence Minister until a new minister is appointed, citing impossibility of serving as a minister under an administration whose political views, values and methods one does not share and warned the new authorities of potential mistakes in foreign policy, particularly related to the Nagorno-Karabakh conflict. He served as Acting Defence Minister until 12 May when David Tonoyan was appointed to the position.

=== Armenian cultural heritage and major international projects ===
Since 2003 Vigen Sargsyan has been actively involved in initiation, planning and execution of major international cultural projects and initiatives, related to presentation of Armenian historic and cultural heritage.

In 2004 Vigen Sargsyan coordinated the first major Armenian Diaspora cultural festival in Yerevan, Armenia, attended by 2,000 participants from over 35 countries. “One Nation, One Culture” festival has since become a recurring major cultural event in the life of global Armenian Diasporas.

In 2006 he coordinated implementation of the Cultural Year of Armenia in Russia and Year of Russia in Armenia. Hundreds of events in multiple cities and towns in Russia and Armenia allowed for cultural and educational exchanges, publications, and exhibitions. The year opened with a major concert in the Kremlin concert Hall and closed with a grand evening in Yekaterininskiy Palace in St. Petersburg, Russia.

At initiative of Vigen Sargsyan the famous “musical fountains” at the central square of Yerevan were fully renovated and relaunched after years of abandonment. It is currently one of the most popular sightseeings of residents of Yerevan and tourists. The fountain was relaunched on Independence Day, 21 September 2007, with a live concert featuring music of Aram Khachaturian and Bolero of Ravel.

In 2006-2007 he has served as a Commissioner General of a major political, economic, and cultural event: Year of Armenia in France. Under the slogan of “Armenie, Mon Amie” the festival included exchange of state visits of the Presidents of two countries, multiple economic and regional events, and a rich cultural program, composed of over 1,200 happenings in 160 towns of France, including major concerts, exhibitions. A youth exchange involved 1,000 students from Armenia visiting host families in France. The pinnacle of the events was a major exhibition “Armenia Sacra!” in the Louvre. The exhibition, widely covered by major French media was visited by over 300,000 visitors. Total of 2,000 news coverages and articles were published in French national and local media throughout the year. The festival was concluded in 2007 by a major convert of Charles Aznavour at the Republic Square. In the context of the Festival Armenia joined and started to play an active role in the International Organization of Francophonie.

Since 2008, Sargsyan chaired the Educational Committee of the "Luys" Foundation, which established generous scholarships for students from Armenia and the Armenian Diaspora, admitted to top 10 universities globally. Between 2008 and 2018 over 500 scholars received up to 50% in tuition and fees of their education at bachelor's and master's level as well as post-graduate studies at top ranking universities.

In 2012 Armenia was celebrating 500-years of Armenian book-printing. One of the first nations to adopt Guttenberg’s innovation, Armenians established first Armenian publishing houses in major cities across Europe, including Amsterdam, Vienna, St. Petersburg. Under Sargsyan’s coordination the State Committee applied for and received appointment by UNESCO for Yerevan to serve as the 12th World Book Capital in 2012. It included numerous international colloques and events in Armenia and abroad.

As part of the events, a major reconstruction of the Museum-Institute of the Armenian Ancient Manuscripts was initiated, and a new building was constructed to host new exhibition halls, research, and state of art storage facilities.

The major event of the festival was the exhibition, entitled “Armenia: Imprints of a Civilization” at the museums of St. Mark’s Square in Venice, Italy: Museo Correr, the Museo Archeologico Nazionale, and the Monumental Rooms of the Biblioteca Nazionale Marciana.

In 2016 Vigen Sargsyan coordinated the State Visit of Pope Francis to Armenia, which was entitled “Pilgrimage to the First Christian Nation.” During major ecumenic events in Yerevan, Gyumri and Etchmiadzin, Pope Francis acknowledged major contribution of Armenians to the Christian heritage and learning, as well as referred to the crime of genocide, committed against Armenians in the Ottoman Empire. He called for peace in the region and emphasized importance of dialogue and tolerance.

In 2018, at initiative and with support of Sargsyan, a major exhibition “Armenia” was held in the Metropolitan Museum of Art in New York, USA. New authorities of Armenia neither invited Sargsyan to participate in the launch of the exhibition, nor wanted to acknowledge his contribution until pressed on the matter by international partners and some of the participating cultural institutions in Armenia.

In 2014 Sargsyan has been elected and served as the Chairman of the Board of Matenadaran, the Museum-Institute of Ancient Armenian Manuscripts. In different times he has also served on the Boards of Yerevan State University, European Academy, Yerevan Institute of Theatre and Cinema, and chaired the Boards of the Yerevan State University of Foreign Languages and the Academy of Public Administration, as well as the Editorial Board of the Journal of Public Administration. In 2008-2011 he has served as the Chairman of the CIS Council of Humanitarian (Art, Culture, Education and Science) Council, elected by representatives of 11 participating countries.

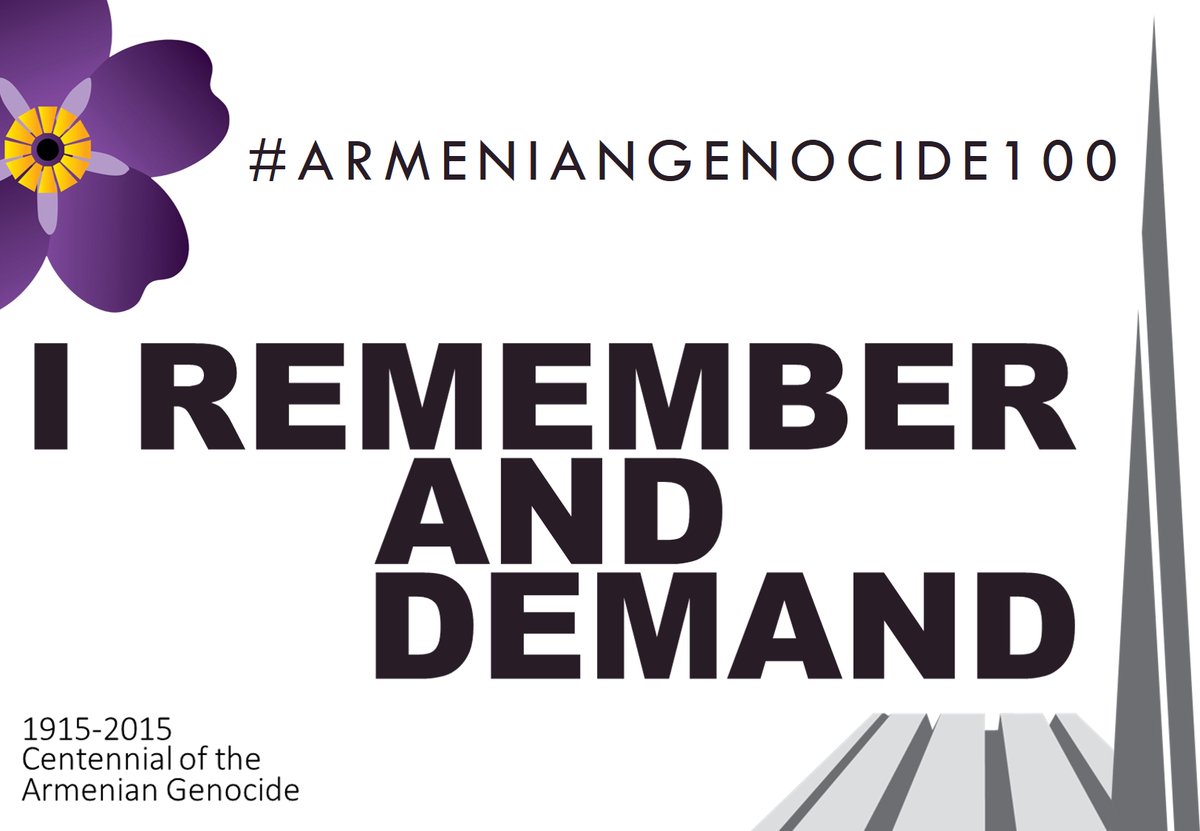
Forget-Me-Not and "I Remember and Demand!": the symbol and slogan of the Centennial Commemorations.

=== Centennial of the Armenian genocide ===
In 2013-2015 Vigen Sargsyan has served as the Chief Coordinator of the events dedicated to the Centennial of the Armenian Genocide. Events were planned and organized around four major pillars: 1. Remembrance of the victims of the crime and losses of the Armenian Nation. 2. Prevention of repetition of the crime of genocide anywhere in the world. 3. Gratitude to those, who responded to the crime and suffering of victims of genocides. 4. Renaissance of the Armenian nation and its heritage.

The official slogan of the commemoration: “I Remember and Demand…” and stylized Forget-Me-Not flower as an emblem of the commemorative events were developed and adopted by the State Committee by proposal of Sargsyan.

In the context of the Centennial, Armenia initiated and successfully implemented adoption of the UN GA Declaration, establishing an International Day of Commemoration and Dignity of the Victims of the Crime of Genocide and of the Prevention of This Crime (December 9).

Some of the main events included a Global Forum Against the Crime of Genocide, which since has become a regular bilateral event. 65 local committees established in over four dozen countries planned and implemented events across the world. Major events were held in Vatican by Pope Francis, Washington National Cathedral with participation of Vice-President Joe Biden, National Dome in Berlin with President Joachim Gauck. Events in Yerevan were attended by 58 national delegations, led by heads of states, parliaments, and governments.

=== 2017 and 2018 parliamentary elections ===
Sargsyan joined the Republican Party of Armenia in November 2016 and a few months later led the party list during the 2017 national parliamentary elections, in which Republican Party secured parliamentary majority by gaining 49.7% of popular vote. After the elections Sargsyan was re-appointed as the Minister of Defense. After resigning in May 2018, Sargsyan returned to active politics a few months later. A few months later Sargsyan was elected the Republican Party's First Deputy Chairman (November 2018), and led the Republican Party’s electoral list in the 2018 December snap parliamentary elections. On 28 November, Sargsyan invited Pashinyan to take part in a live TV debate, but the proposal was turned down by Pashinyan. The Central Electoral Commission announced that the Republican Party fell 0.2% short of the necessary votes to win any seats in parliament, and the party became extra-parliamentary opposition for the first time in its history.

=== Legal issues and opposition politician ===
Vigen Sargsyan has been a severe critic of Pashinyan's government since August 2018. He has described the authorities' stance on Nagorno-Karabakh conflict and matters of domestic and international politics as amateur and opportunistic, and warned that they will inevitably lead to a new war and dire consequences for the country.

On 25 September 2019, the Investigative Committee of Armenia announced that there might be sufficient grounds to indict Sargsyan, only to drop the claims weeks later. It was alleged that Sargsyan violated regulations for the allotment of state-funded housing while serving as defence minister, but the prosecutor overseeing the case returned it to the Investigative Committee as lacking grounds. Sargsyan, who currently resides in the United States, rejected the accusations as politically motivated.

In November 2020, after the defeat of the Armenian side in the 2020 Nagorno-Karabakh war, Sargsyan joined a number of other public figures calling for the resignation of Prime Minister Nikol Pashinyan.

In February 2023, Sargsyan was charged in connection with the aforementioned case of alleged violations in the process of distribution of government-funded housing to Armenian army officers. Sargsian strongly denied allegations, as the apartments were allocated in accordance with rules set by the Armenian government and based on their recipients’ “combat background and merits.” He challenged the current government to release the list of housing recipients. Sargsian claims that Prime Minister Nikol Pashinian’s administration ordered his “political persecution” to keep him from returning to Armenia. In July 2023, Armenian prosecutors issued an international warrant for Sargsyan's arrest.

== Personal life ==
He is married and has three daughters. He is fluent in Russian and English, apart from his native Armenian.

== Awards ==
- Armenia:
  - Services to the Motherland Medal, 1st class (2015)
  - Services to the Motherland Medal 2nd class (2013)
  - Movses Khorenatsi Medal
  - Andranik Ozanyan Medal
  - Golden Medal of the National Assembly of Armenia (2015)
  - Medal of the Prime Minister of Armenia (2006)
- Foreign and International:
  - Insignia of the Collective Security Treaty Organization (2018)
  - Order of the Commonwealth of Independent States (2016)
  - Order National du Merit of the French Republic (2008)
  - Honorable Citation by the President of France (2007)

Political offices
Preceded by Seyran Ohanyan	Defence Minister of Armenia; 2016–2018	Succeeded by David Tonoyan
