= Hovhannes Hakhverdyan =

Armenian politician (1873–1931)

- Հովհաննես Հախվերդյան
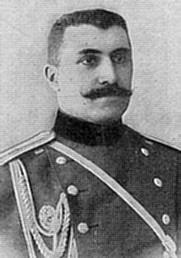

1st Defence Minister of Armenia
- In office 15 April 1918 – 27 March 1919
- Preceded by: position established
- Succeeded by: Christophor Araratov

Personal details
- Born: 29 July 1873 Saint Petersburg, Russian Empire
- Died: 28 April 1931 (aged 57) Moscow, Soviet Union
- Resting place: Armenia
- Party: Independent
- Relations: Ruben Hakhverdyan (grandson)
- Awards: see below

Military service
- Allegiance: Russian Empire (1890–1917); Republic of Armenia (1918–1920)
- Years of service: 1890–1920
- Rank: Major General
- Battles/wars: Russo-Japanese War; World War I; Armenian–Azerbaijani War; Muslim uprisings in Kars and Sharur–Nakhichevan

Hovhannes Vasily Hakhverdyan (Armenian: Հովհաննես Հախվերդյան; Russian: Ованес Ахвердян, Иван Васильевич Ахвердов) (29 July 1873 – 28 April 1931) was the first Minister of Defence of the First Republic of Armenia from 15 April 1918 to 27 March 1919.

== Early life ==
Hovhannes Hakhverdyan was born in Saint Petersburg on 29 July 1873 in an Armenian noble family. His father, Vasily Fyodor Hakhverdov, was a Real State Councilor. He had two brothers, Major General Gavriil Hakhverdov and Lieutenant Colonel Georgiy Hakhverdov.

He graduated from the 1st Cadet Corps of Saint Peterburg in 1890, the 1st Military Pavlov School in 1892 and the Nikolaev Academy of Joint Staff in 1902.

== Military career ==
Hakhverdyan participated in the Russian-Japanese War. He was appointed a Major General of the Russian Army on 22 October 1915. On 11 May 1916, he became head of Joint Staff of 120th Infantry Division.

After switching allegiance to the Republic of Armenia, Hakhverdyan was appointed Minister of Defense in the cabinet of Hovhannes Katchaznouni on 30 June 1918. He was not member of any political party and was supported by most of the powers as a professional and fair candidate for the Defense Minister position. Drastamat Kanayan was originally chosen to be the first Defence Minister, but had turned the position down. On 27 April 1919, Hakhverdyan left his position and Christophor Araratov became Defense Minister. Afterwards, he occupied the position of Head of Joint Staff. From 5 May 1920 to 25 November 1920, he was Vice-Minister of Defense.

During the Soviet invasion in December 1920, he was arrested with about 1,500 Armenia officers, including Tovmas Nazarbekian and Movses Silikyan. He later worked as a cashier. In 1930, he was arrested "for being a member of the counter-revolutionary monarchist officers' group, participating in the gatherings of the group, and having uncompromising attitudes toward the Soviet government". He was shot in Moscow on 28 April 1931. Hakhverdyan was rehabilitated on 20 October 1989.

== Personal life ==
Hakhverdyan is the grandfather of famous Armenian bard Ruben Hakhverdyan.

== Military awards ==
- (Russian Empire) Order of St. Anna, 4th degree (1902)
- (Russian Empire) Order of Saint Stanislaus, 3rd degree with Swords and Bow (1905)
- (Russian Empire) Order of St. Anna, 3rd degree with Swords and Bow (1905)
- (Russian Empire) Order of Saint Stanislaus, 4th degree with Swords and Bow (1906)
- (Russian Empire) Order of Saint Stanislaus, 2nd degree with Swords (1906)
- (Russian Empire) Order of St. Anna, 2nd degree with Swords (1906)
- (Russian Empire) Order of St. George, 4th degree (3 February 1916)
- Order of the Golden Star of Bukhara, 2nd degree
