= Suren Papikyan =

Armenian politician (born 1986)

- Սուրեն Պապիկյան
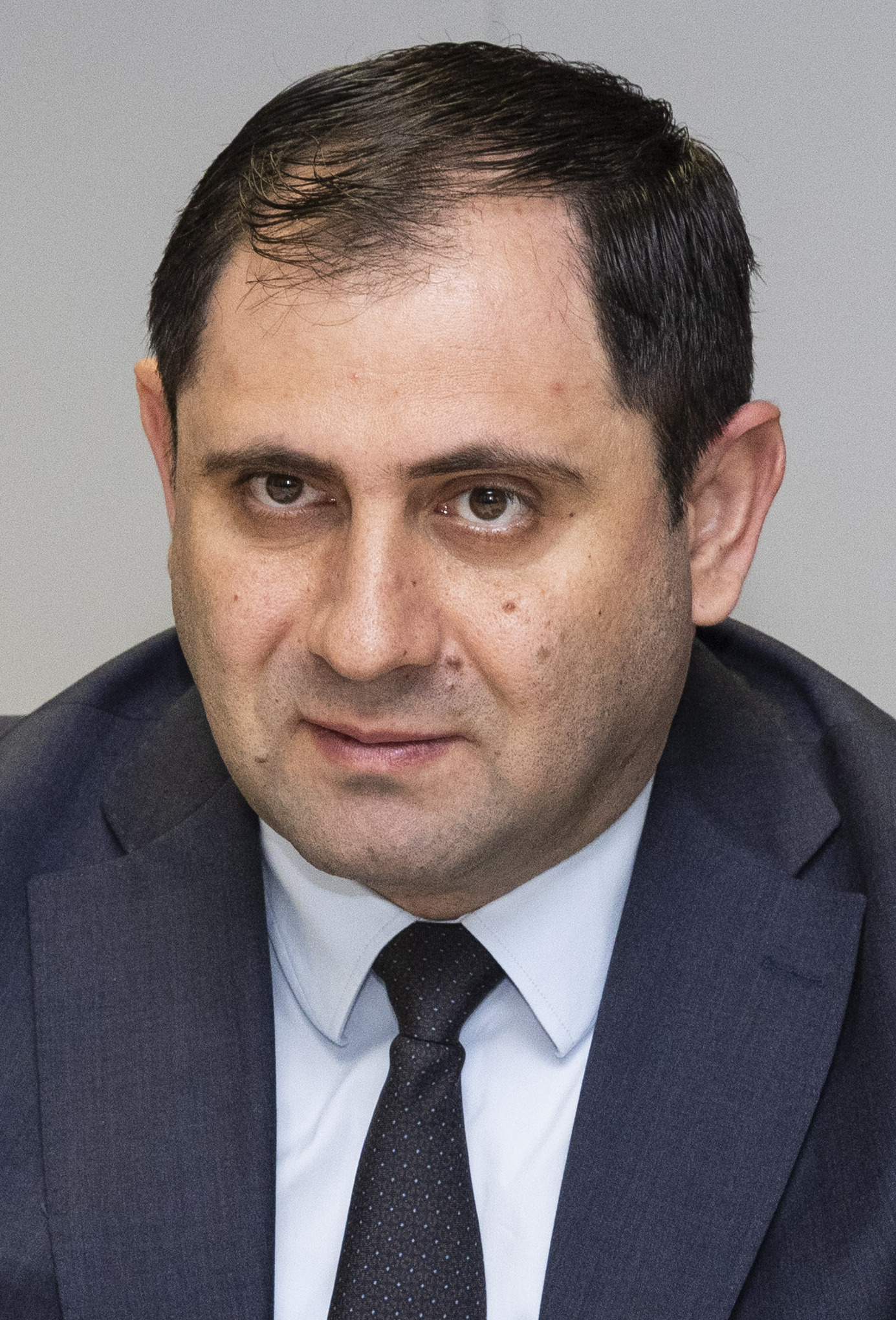
- Papikyan in 2026

Minister of Defense
- Incumbent
- Assumed office 15 November 2021
- President: Armen Sarkissian; Vahagn Khachaturyan
- Prime Minister: Nikol Pashinyan
- Preceded by: Arshak Karapetyan

Deputy Prime Minister of Armenia
- In office 2 August 2021 – 15 November 2021 Serving with Mher Grigoryan
- President: Armen Sarkissian
- Prime Minister: Nikol Pashinyan
- Preceded by: Tigran Avinyan
- Succeeded by: Hambardzum Matevosyan

Minister of Territorial Administration and Infrastructure of Armenia
- In office 11 May 2018 – 2 August 2021
- Preceded by: Davit Lokyan
- Succeeded by: Gnel Sanosyan

Chairman of the Board of Civil Contract
- In office 16 June 2019 – 30 October 2022
- Preceded by: Sasun Mikayelyan
- Succeeded by: Nikol Pashinyan

Personal details
- Born: 26 April 1986 (age 40) Stepanavan, Armenian SSR, Soviet Union
- Party: Civil Contract Party
- Education: Yerevan State University; Saint Petersburg State University
- Awards: Officer of Legion of Honour

Suren Rafiki Papikyan (Armenian: Սուրեն Ռաֆիկի Պապիկյան; born 26 April 1986) is an Armenian politician serving as the minister of defense of Armenia since 2021. He formerly served as minister of territorial administration and infrastructure and briefly as deputy prime minister. He is also chairman of the board of the ruling Civil Contract Party.

== Biography ==
Suren Papikyan was born on 26 April 1986, in the town of Stepanavan, now in the Lori Province of Armenia. He graduated from Stepanavan College No. 1 and was accepted to the Faculty of History of Yerevan State University in 2003. Papikyan was called up for service in the Armenian Armed Forces while attending university. While serving in the military, Papikyan was sentenced to two years and three months imprisonment, reportedly due to a violent incident with a commanding officer, but was released about a year later in a general amnesty.

Papikyan received his master's degree in history with honors from Yerevan State University in 2012. Parallel to his studies, he worked as a history teacher at Yerevan High School No. 54 from 2010 to 2016 and from 2011 to 2018 at Quantum College in Yerevan. From 2012 to 2016 he conducted his postgraduate studies at Saint Petersburg State University.

Papikyan is a founding member of the Civil Contract Party. He was elected deputy chairman of the party board in 2016 and chairman of the board in 2019.

Papikyan participated in the 2017 Armenian parliamentary elections as a candidate for the Way Out Alliance. Papikyan participated in the 2018 Armenian revolution which brought Nikol Pashinyan to power.

On 11 May 2018, Papikyan was appointed Minister of Territorial Administration and Development of Armenia in Nikol Pashinyan's first government.

During the 2018 snap parliamentary elections, he headed the campaign headquarters of the My Step bloc and was elected to parliament as a member of the same bloc. Papikyan resigned from parliament in January 2019. He was reappointed minister of territorial administration and infrastructure on 1 June 2019.

After briefly occupying the position of deputy prime minister, Papikyan was appointed Minister of Defense of Armenia on 15 November 2021. The day after his appointment, significant clashes occurred on the Armenian–Azerbaijani border, resulting in human and territorial losses for the Armenian side.

== Awards ==
- Garegin Nzhdeh medal
- Officer of Legion of Honour (2026)

Political offices
Preceded by Arshak Karapetyan	Minister of Defence of Armenia; 2021–present	Incumbent
