= Arshak Karapetyan =

- Արշակ Կարապետյան
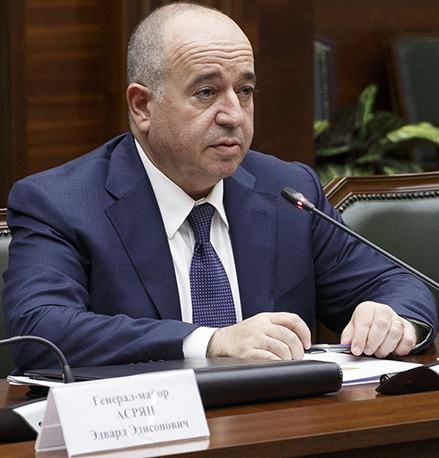
- Karapetyan in 2021

Minister of Defence
- In office 3 August 2021 – 15 November 2021
- President: Armen Sarkissian
- Prime Minister: Nikol Pashinyan
- Preceded by: Vagharshak Harutiunyan
- Succeeded by: Suren Papikyan

Personal details
- Born: 6 February 1967 (age 59) Yerevan, Armenian SSR, Soviet Union
- Education: Frunze Military Academy

Military service
- Branch/service: Soviet Navy (1984–1991); Armenia Armed Forces (1993–2018)
- Years of service: 1984–1991; 1993–2018
- Rank: Major general

Arshak Karapetyan (Armenian: Արշակ Կարապետյան; born 6 February 1967) is an Armenian major general who served as Minister of Defense of Armenia from 3 August to 15 November 2021.

== Biography ==
Arshak Karapetyan was born on 6 February 1967 in Yerevan. From 1984 to 1989 he studied in Russia at the Kaliningrad Higher Naval College. From 1994 to 1997 he studied at the Frunze Military Academy of the Russian Armed Forces, graduating with a gold medal. In 2006 he took an English-language military course at the University of York in the United Kingdom, and in 2008 took a course at the Military Academy of the Russian Armed Forces. In 2011, he attended courses at Harvard Kennedy School.

He served in the Armed Forces of Armenia from 1993 to 2018. He holds the rank of major general. From 2018 to 2021 he was an advisor to Prime Minister Nikol Pashinyan. From 13 April to 20 July 2021, he was the First Deputy Chief of the General Staff of the Armed Forces of Armenia. On 20 July 2021, by the decision of Prime Minister Nikol Pashinyan, he was appointed First Deputy Minister of Defense, and on 2 August of the same year, he was appointed Minister of Defense.

Karapetyan was dismissed on 15 November 2021 and succeeded by Suren Papikyan. after reporting full control over the border with Azerbaijan the previous day despite Azerbaijani forces having already infiltrated it. He then established a political group critical of Pashinyan called the All-Armenian Front, which called for closer relations with Russia and Iran.

Karapetyan became wanted in Armenia on charges of illegal participation in business activities and abuse of power. He also has extensive business ties in Russia, including partnerships with Armenian-born Russian billionaire Samvel Karapetyan, with whom he has no biological relation to.

On 29 December 2024, Karapetyan was arrested by Russian authorities in Moscow following a request from Armenia, but was released on bail shortly afterwards.
