= Government of Artsakh =

Executive branch of the government of the Republic of Artsakh

The Government of the Republic of Artsakh (Armenian: Արցախի Հանրապետության Կառավարություն) is the governing authority of the Republic of Artsakh, a once de-facto state, which is now a government-in-exile headed in Yerevan.

== Leaders ==
The executive council of government ministers is headed by the President of Artsakh. The 2017 constitutional referendum approved the transformation of the government into a presidential system; the office of the Prime Minister was thereby abolished.

== Government ministries ==
=== Ministry of Foreign Affairs ===
Foreign policy of the state was governed by the Ministry of Foreign Affairs of Republic of Artsakh. The Ministry was based in the capital city of Stepanakert.

Below is a list of the foreign ministers that represented the Republic of Artsakh:

- 1993–1997: Arkadi Ghukasyan
- 1997–2002: Naira Melkumian
- 2002–2004: Ashot Gulyan
- 2004–2005: Arman Melikyan
- 2005–2011: Georgy Petrosyan
- 2011–2012: Vasily Atajanyan (acting)
- 2012–2017: Karen Mirzoyan
- 2017–2021: Masis Mayilyan
- 2021–2023: David Babayan
- 2023–2024: Sergey Ghazaryan

=== Ministry of Defense ===
The Ministry of Defense was a government agency in charge of the Artsakh Defence Army.

=== Ministry of Internal Affairs ===
On 25 January 2021, Artsakh President Arayik Harutyunyan signed a decree to combine the Police and State Emergency Service into a new Ministry of Internal Affairs. Karen Grigory Sargsyan was appointed as its head.

=== Ministers of Health ===
- Vyacheslav Aghabalyan (1992-1995, 1997)
- Zoya Lazaryan (1996-1997, 1999-2007, 2012-2014)
- Armen Khachatryan (2007-2010)
- Sergey Movsisyan (2010-2014)
- Harutyun Kushkyan (2014-2016)
- Karina Atayan (2016-2018)
- Arayik Bagiryan (2018–2020)
- Ararat Oganjanyan (2020)
- Mikayel Airiyan (2020—2022)
- Samvel Avetisyan (2022-2023)
- Vardan Tadevosyan (2023)

=== Ministers of Culture, Sports and Youth Affairs ===
- Armen Sargsyan (1997-1999)
- Narine Aghabalyan (2009-2017 - Minister of Culture and Youth Affairs)
- Sergey Shakhverdyan (2017-2018)

== The Government ==
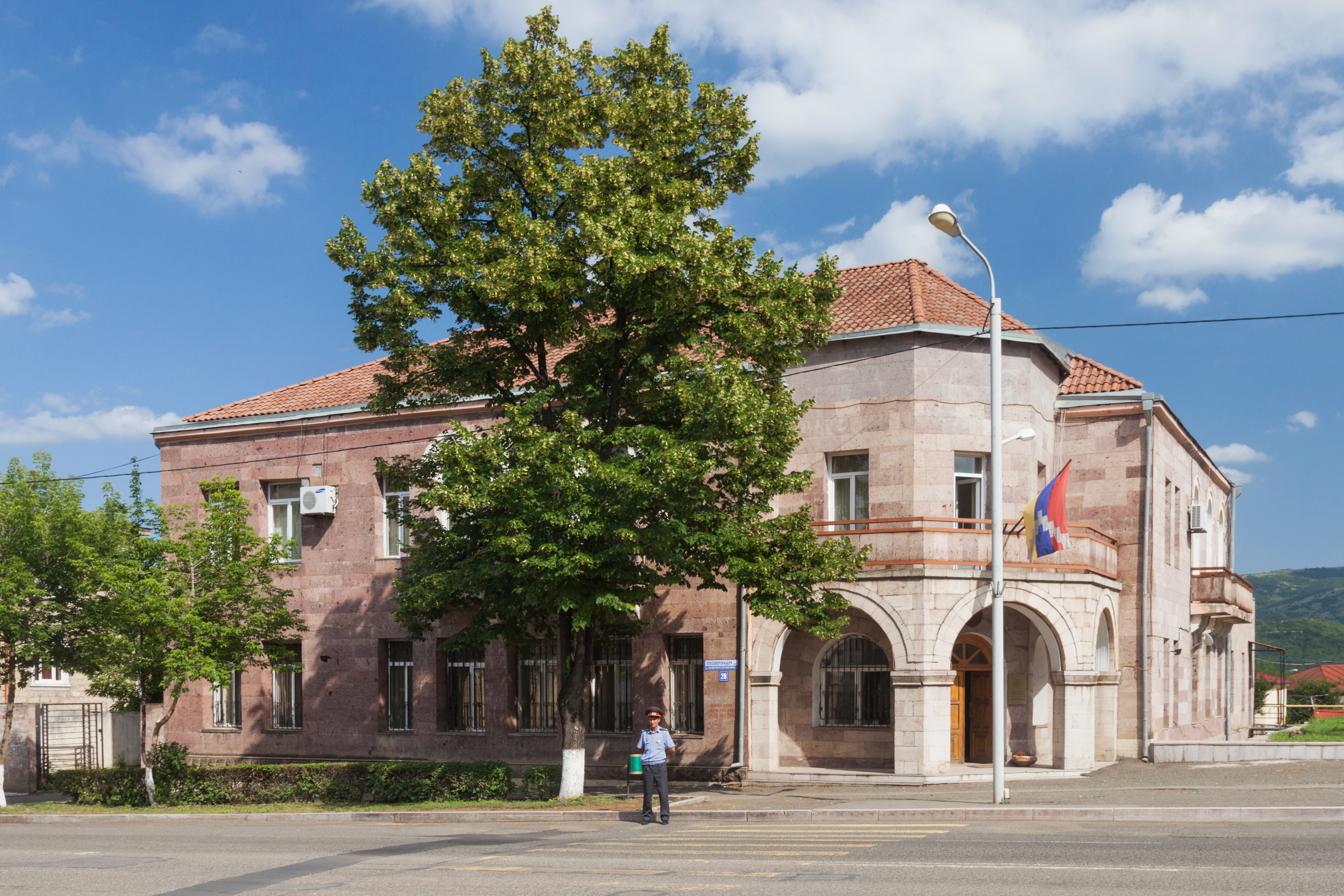
The Artsakh Ministry of Foreign Affairs in Stepanakert

=== Security Council ===
The Security Council (Armenian: Անվտանգության խորհուրդ, romanized: Anvtangut’yan khorhurd) was the highest decision-making defence and law enforcement body in the Republic of Artsakh.

The following served as secretaries of the council:

- Vitaly Balasanyan (November 2016 – November 2019)
- Samvel Babayan (29 May 2020 – 10 November 2020)
- Vitaly Balasanyan (December 2020 – 7 January 2023)
- Ararat Melkumyan (January 7–16, 2023)
- Samvel Shahramanyan (March 2023 - 10 September 2023)

=== Police of Artsakh ===
After the annexation of Artsakh to the Azerbaijan SSR, on 4 August 1923, the People's Commissariat for Internal Affairs of the NKAO was established. In the years following the First Nagorno-Karabakh War, the Republic of Artsakh created its own police force. In 2001, the National Assembly's law "On Police" was adopted on 30 November 2006. On 11 March 2014, Police Day in Artsakh was declared for 16 April. The police force followed an organisation similar to that of the Police of Armenia.

=== National Security Service ===
Artsakh had its own National Security Service, based on the NSS of Armenia. It was a republican body that elaborated and implemented the policies of the government in the national security sector. By decree of the NKR Supreme Council adopted on 18 January 2006, the NKAO State Security Department was named the State Department of National Security under the NKR Council of Ministers. By order of the NKR National Assembly on 26 November 2003, the NKR laws "On National Security Bodies" and "On Service in National Security Bodies" were adopted. The activities of the NSS were based in the decrees of 25 September 2012. The NSS was headed by Lieutenant General Kamo Aghajanyan.

== See also ==
- Republic of Artsakh (government in exile)
- National Assembly (Artsakh)
- Politics of Artsakh
- President of Artsakh
- Government of Armenia
