= Arpine Sargsyan =

Armenian politician and jurist (born 1994)

- Արփինե Սարգսյան
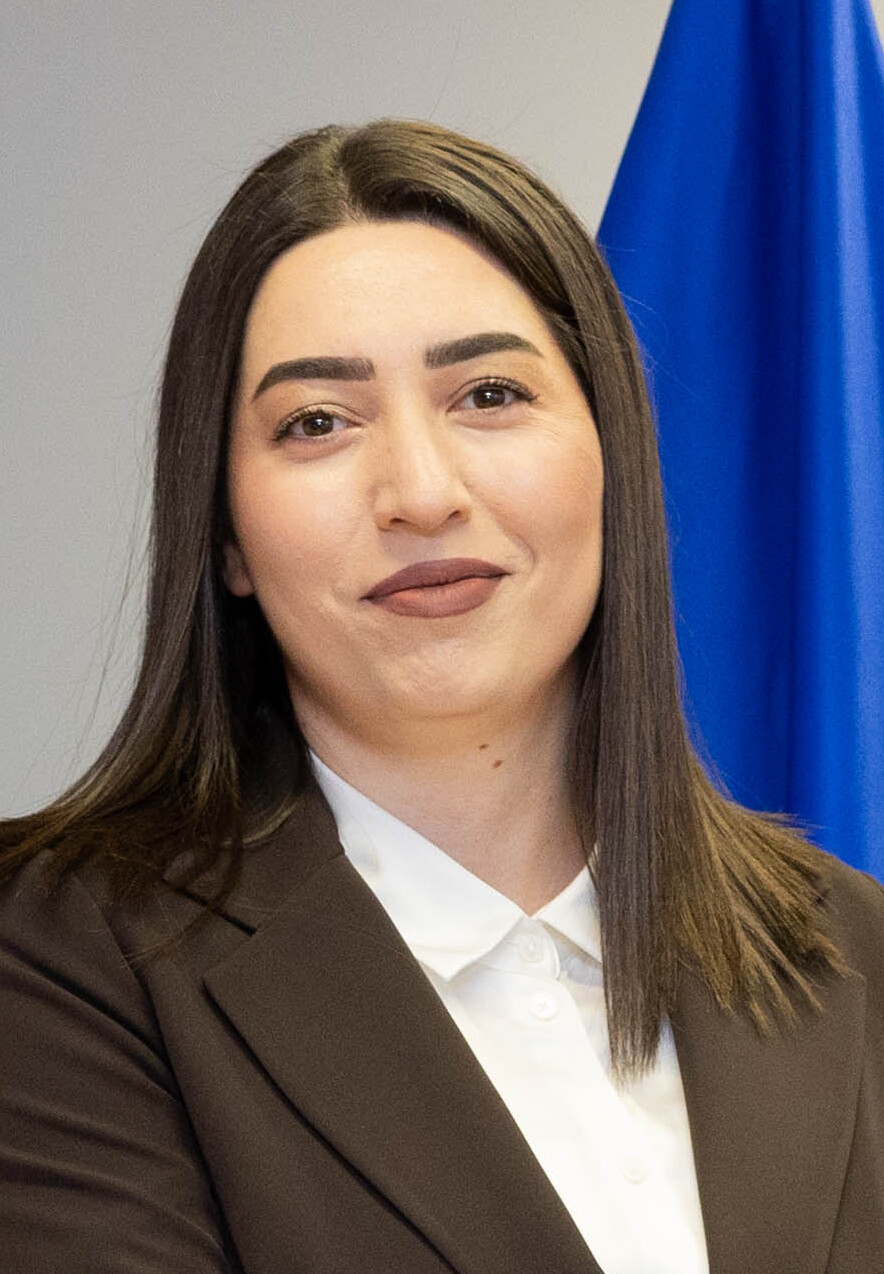
- Sargsyan in 2025

Minister of Internal Affairs
- Incumbent
- Assumed office 20 November 2024
- Prime Minister: Nikol Pashinyan
- Preceded by: Vahe Ghazaryan

Personal details
- Born: Arpine Ashot Sargsyan; 14 April 1994 (age 32) Vedi, Armenia
- Party: Independent
- Education: Yerevan State University

Arpine Ashoti Sargsyan (Armenian: Արփինե Աշոտի Սարգսյան; born 14 April 1994) is an Armenian jurist and politician, first female minister of internal affairs of Armenia since 2024.

== Early life ==
Sargsyan was born in Vedi, Armenia, on 14 April 1994. She got a degree in law from the Yerevan State University in 2015, where she also obtained a master's degree in law in 2017 and where she is a PhD researcher in criminal law since 2017.

== Career ==
She began working in 2015 as an expert in criminal law at the Ministry of Justice. In 2016, she was assistant to the deputy minister of justice and that year, until 2019, she was a technical expert in the ministry's anti-corruption and prison policy department, where she became a leading specialist. Sargsyan also served as a teacher for government anti-corruption officials and prison officers through a United Nations programme.

Between 2017 and 2022, Sargsyan was part of the working group responsible for reforming the Criminal Code. In 2019, she joined the Central Body of the Penitentiary Service of the ministry, and until 2022 she was responsible for the departments of prison and anti-corruption policy and criminal and prison legislation.

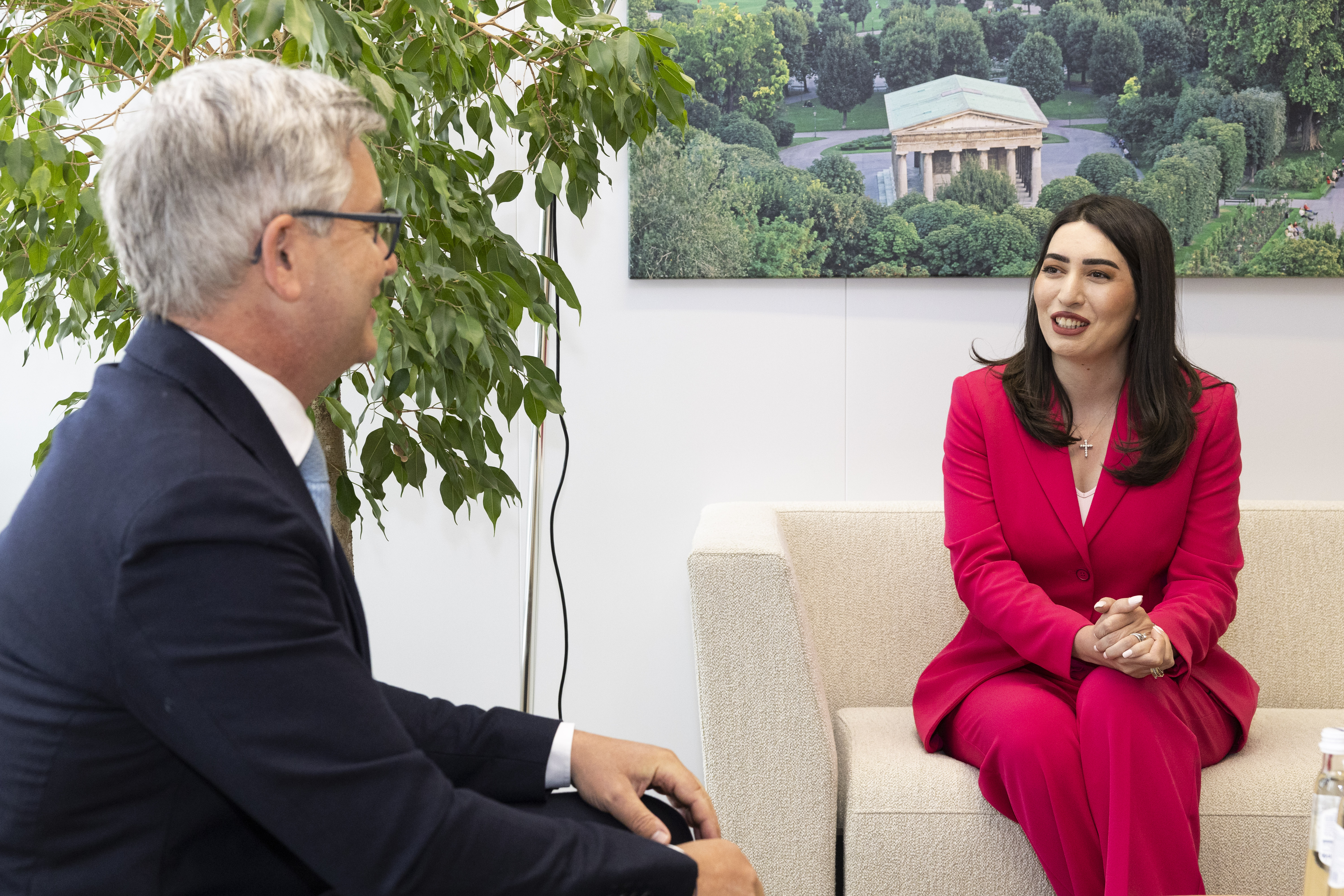
Sargsyan with European Commissioner for Internal Affairs and Migration Magnus Brunner in Brussels, June 2025

Between January 2022 and January 2023, she was deputy minister of justice, and between January 2023 and November 2024, Deputy Minister of Internal Affairs.

On 20 November 2024, Prime Minister Nikol Pashinyan named Sargsyan as the new minister of internal affairs, succeeding Vahe Ghazaryan who resigned few days prior. She was sworn in on 20 December 2024 and became the first female minister of internal affaris in the country's history.

In June 2025 she presented the 2025-2027 Strategy and Action Plan for Combating Drug Trafficking, which was approved by the government on 5 June. In October 2025, she approved the new biometric ID card. On 30 October 2025, she announced that Armenia would have a Unified Strategy for Crime Prevention for the first time.

Following the establishment of the new civilian Police Guard, which replaced the so-called police troops, Sargsyan appointed its first commander, Major General Hayk Babayan, in November 2025. On 5 November Sargsyan received the Action Plan for visa liberalisation between the EU and Armenia from Johannes Luchner, deputy director-general of the European Commission's Directorate-General for Migration and Home Affairs, at an event she described as a "historic step" towards implementing visa liberalisation with the European Union.

== Personal life ==
Sargsyan is married and speaks fluently English and Russian.

== Publications ==
- "Sanitary rights of people defined and condemned and mechanisms for its implementation" (co-author).
