= Vladimir Gasparyan =

Chief of Police
- In office 1 November 2011 – 10 May 2018
- Preceded by: Alik Sargsyan
- Succeeded by: Valeri Osipyan

Personal details
- Born: Vladimir Gasparyan; September 9, 1958 (age 68) Tallinn, then part of Estonian SSR, Soviet Union
- Spouse: Married
- Children: 4
- Nickname: Vova

Vladimir "Vova" Sergeyi Gasparyan (Armenian: Վլադիմիր Սերգեյի Գասպարյան, born September 9, 1958) is a former Chief of Armenia's police from November 1, 2011 till his dismissal on May 10, 2018.

== Early life and career ==
Earlier in his life he served in the armed forces of the USSR. He served from 1976-1978. From 1982-1995, worked in the apparatus of the Ministry of Internal Affairs of the Armenian Soviet Socialist Republic and later the Republic of Armenia. In the early 80s, he was the junior inspector of the operational-search group in the Criminal Investigation Department of the Internal Affairs Directorate of Yerevan. He was a deputy minister and head of the territorial administration of Sevan and Armavir. In 1989, he graduated from the Higher Investigation School (HSS) of the Soviet Ministry of Interior in Volgograd, specializing in investigation. From 1990-1995, he served as a deputy of the Supreme Soviet of the Armenian SSR, being a member of the "Republic" faction. In 1997, he became the first Chief of the Military Police of Armenia, serving for 13 years in this position. From 2010-2011, he was the Deputy Minister of Defense of Armenia.

== Armenian police chief ==
On 1 November 2011, by the decree of President Serzh Sargsyan, he was appointed Chief of the Police of the Republic of Armenia. Following the 2018 Velvet Revolution in Armenia, he was relieved of his post by the new Pashinyan government.

== Post-police activities ==
Gasparyan faced charges after obstructing the work of a film crew of Radio Azatutyun, threatening to run the journalists over with his quadricycle, to ‘shoot and kill’ them.

== Private life ==
Gasparyan is married with four children.

=== Awards ===
- Vardan Mamikonian Order
- "For Courage" medal
- "Service to the Motherland" 2nd rank medal
- Ministry of Defence "Marshal Baghramian" medal
- Ministry of Defence "Drastamat Kanaian" medal
- Ministry of Defence "Vazgen Sargsyan" medal
- Ministry of Defence "Impeccable Service" medal
- Police "Strengthening Cooperation" medal
