= Lazarev Institute of Oriental Languages =

School in Moscow, Russia

Embassy of Armenia in Moscow Посольство Армении в Москве
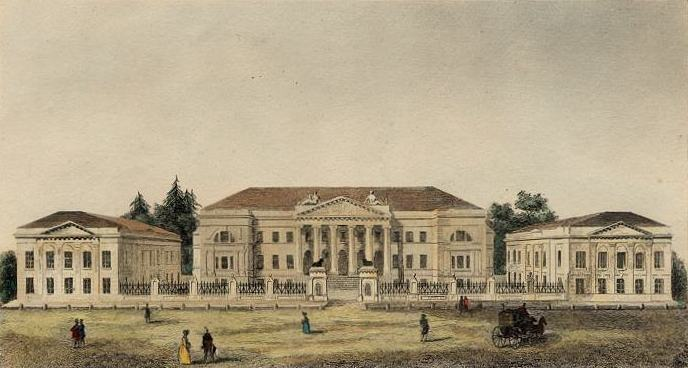
- Location: Moscow, Russia
- Address: 2 Armyansky Lane (2 Армянский переулок)
- Coordinates: 55°45′37.5186″N 37°38′5.3664″E
- Ambassador: Vagharshak Harutiunyan

The Lazarev Institute of Oriental Languages, (Armenian: Լազարևի արևելյան լեզուների ինստիտուտ, romanized: Lazarevi arevelyan lezuneri institut) established in 1815, was a school specializing in orientalism, with a particular focus on that of Armenia, and was the principal cultural center of the Armenian diaspora in Moscow, Russia. Many Russian scholars specializing in Transcaucasus related studies received their education at the institute. The former institute, located on Armyansky Lane, is listed as a memorial building and currently houses the Embassy of Armenia (Armenian: Ռուսաստանում Հայաստանի դեսպանություն, romanized: Rrusastanum Hayastani despanut’yun) to Russia.

== The institute ==
The institute was established in 1815 by the wealthy Lazarev (Lazarian) family. In 1827, control passed to the Ministry of Public Education, the school was renamed the Lazarev Institute of Oriental Languages, and was remodeled as a special gymnasium with language courses in Arabic, Armenian, Persian, and Turkish. By 1844 the school had 105 students, of which 73 were Armenians, 30 Russians, and 2 others. In 1848 the institute was upgraded to a lyceum, and in this new form trained Armenian school teachers and priests. As the Russian Empire expanded through the Caucasus and Central Asia, the institute became central to the training of Russian civil servants and interpreters. In 1872 it was formally divided into two sections, one of which continued as a gymnasium, while the other presented a three-year course in the Armenian, Persian, Arabic, Turkish, and Georgian languages, history, and culture.

Between 1919 and 1920, the institute was renamed first the Armenian Institute, then the Southwest Asian Institute, then the Central Institute of Modern Oriental Languages, and finally the Moscow Institute of Oriental Studies. By the 1930s the institute had lost its students, and its library was transferred to the Moscow's Lenin Library. Pioneering linguist Roman Jakobson was a student at the Lazarev Institute of Oriental Languages.

== The building ==
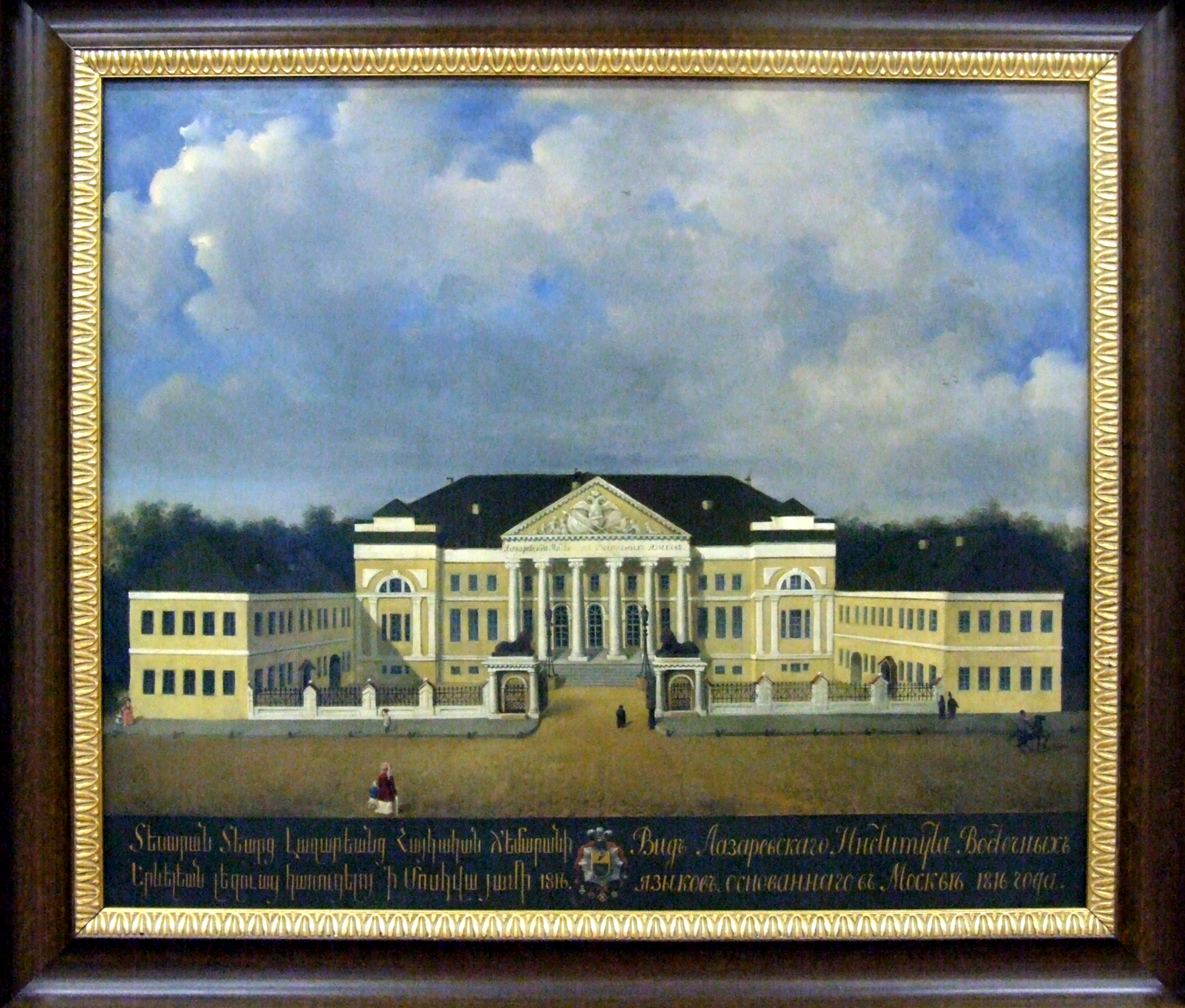
Lazarev Institute

The first stone buildings on the site, eventually incorporated into present-day building, emerged in the last quarter of the 17th century as the Miloslavsky residence. In the first half of the 18th century, they were owned by the Meller family – owners of iron mills in Ural region. Miloslavsky-Meller house is considered to be among the largest private stone buildings of 17th-century Moscow. Agasar Lazaryan, russified as Lazarev, acquired the land near the corner of present-day Krivokolenny and Armyansky lanes in 1758. Between 1758 and 1812 the main house was gradually expanded, notably by Ovakim Lazarev, son of Lazar and founder of the institute. Armyansky Lane area was spared by the Fire of 1812. In 1814 Ovakim Lazarev commissioned remodelling of the facade in Empire style. The name of the architect remains unknown; construction was managed by T. G. Prostakov, a free man, and I. M. Podyachy – a serf of Lazarevs.

By 1823 the main building acquired its present-day shape; an obelisk in the rear courtyard, raised in 1822, was cast of pig iron produced at Lazarev's iron mills in Perm (later, the obelisk was moved into the front courtyard). In 1828 Lazarev purchased an adjacent building (2, Armyansky Lane) and converted it to an Armenian printshop. This corner lot was previously owned by Saltykov and Nesvitsky families. New property remained unchanged until the 1850s, when Pyotr Grigoriev (son of Afanasy Grigoriev) rebuilt it to match the main building. Subsequent restorations retained the street facades, but removed Grigoriev's finishes on the side wall, revealing 17th-century brickwork.

== Embassy of Armenia to Russia ==
The building currently houses the Armenian embassy to Russia. As of 5 January 2022, the ambassador of Armenia to Russia is Vagharshak Harutiunyan.

== See also ==
- Armenia–Russia relations
- Diplomatic missions in Russia
- Foreign relations of Armenia
- List of diplomatic missions of Armenia

== Sources ==
- Памятники архитектуры Москвы. Белый город. — М.: Искусство, 1989. – c. 253–259
- Bournoutian, George, Russia and the Armenians of Transcaucasia, 1797–1889: A Documentary Record, Costa Mesa, CA: Mazda Press, 1998.
- Worrell, William H., "An Account of Schools for Living Oriental Languages Established in Europe", Journal of the American Oriental Society, Vol. 39, 1919 (1919), pp. 189–195
