= State Service of Emergency Situations =

Civil defense

- Արտակարգ իրավիճակների պետական ծառայություն
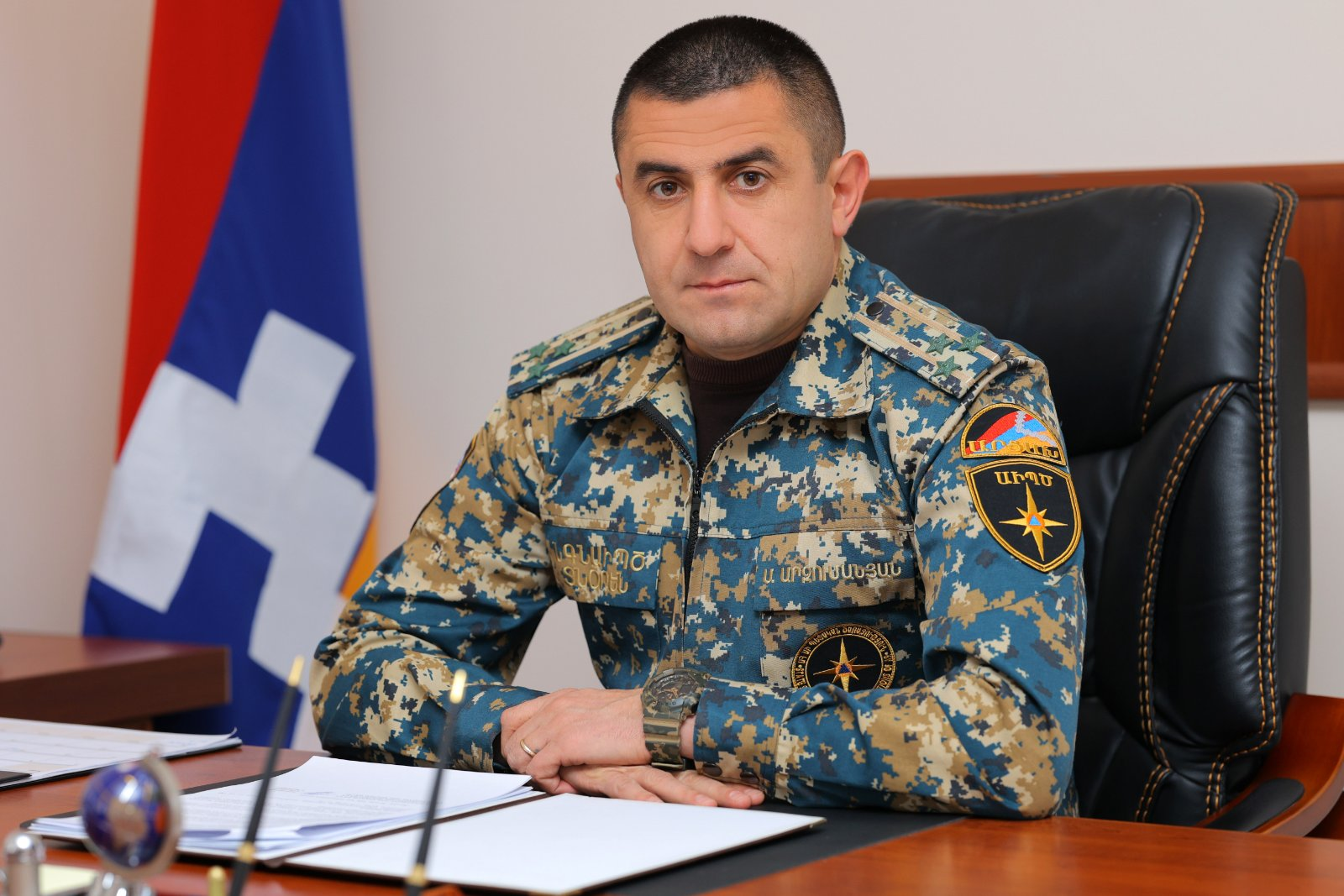

Agency overview
- Dissolved: 2021
- Superseding agency: Ministry of the Interior
- Jurisdiction: Government of Artsakh
- Headquarters: 17 Building, Arakel Arakelyan Street, Stepanakert
- Minister responsible: Mekhak Arzumanyan
- Agency executive: Director
- Website: www.rs-nkr.am

The State Service of Emergency Situations (Armenian: Արտակարգ իրավիճակների պետական ծառայություն, romanized: Artakarg iravichakneri petakan tsarrayut’yun) was the emergencies and civil defense ministry of the unrecognized Republic of Artsakh (known regionally as Nagorno-Karabakh). The service was authorized to make decisions on the protection of the population from natural disasters and other geological processes. The last director was Mekhak Arzumanyan. From May 2020 to January, Karen Grigory Sargsyan was the Director of the Service. It was subordinated to the Cabinet of Ministers. The militarized units of the service were regulated according to the NKR laws "On Conscription", and "On entering the military service". The professional holiday of the service was celebrated on 31 October, known as the Day of the Emergency Workers.

It was merged into the Ministry of Internal Affairs in 2021.

== Actions ==
It served during the following conflicts:

- 2019 Earthquake along the Artsakh-Azerbaijan border
- July 2020 Armenian–Azerbaijani clashes
- 2020 Nagorno-Karabakh conflict

== See also ==
- State Emergency Service of Ukraine
- Ministry of Emergency Situations (Armenia)
