= David Tonoyan =

Armenian politician

- Դավիթ Տոնոյան
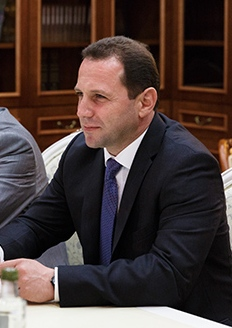
- Tonoyan in 2016

Minister of Defence
- In office 10 May 2018 – 20 November 2020
- President: Armen Sarkissian
- Prime Minister: Nikol Pashinyan
- Preceded by: Vigen Sargsyan
- Succeeded by: Vagharshak Harutiunyan

Minister of Emergency Situations of Armenia
- In office 6 February 2017 – 10 May 2018
- President: Serzh Sargsyan; Armen Sarkissian
- Prime Minister: Karen Karapetyan
- Preceded by: Armen Yeritsyan
- Succeeded by: Hrachya Rostomyan

Personal details
- Born: 27 December 1967 (age 58) Ust-Kamenogorsk, Kazakh SSR, Soviet Union
- Party: Independent
- Children: 2

Military service
- Branch/service: Soviet Army; Armenian Ground Forces
- Years of service: 1986–Present
- Rank: Colonel of the Reserve
- Battles/wars: Second Nagorno-Karabakh War

David Edgari Tonoyan (Armenian: Դավիթ Էդգարի Տոնոյան; born 27 December 1967) is an Armenian political figure and former Defence Minister of Armenia, in office from 2018 to 2020.

== Biography ==
=== Early life and career ===
David Tonoyan was born on 27 December 1967 in the city of Ust-Kamenogorsk (now Oskemen, Kazakhstan), in the East Kazakhstan Region of the Kazakh SSR. He is the grandson of Hovhannes Hakobov, a veteran of the Red Army who took part in the Second World War. In 1986, he joined the Soviet Armed Forces's Transcaucasian Military District. He moved to Yerevan to attend Yerevan State University, which he graduated from in 1991. He entered the Armed Forces of Armenia in 1992. In 1997, he graduated from the Military University of the Ministry of Defence of the Russian Federation. Between 1998 and 2007, Tonoyan held various positions at NATO’s headquarters in Brussels, serving as the Armenian Representative to NATO for three years. In 2007, Tonoyan returned to Armenia to head the departments on international military cooperation and defence policy in the Ministry of Defence.

From 2010 to 2017, Tonoyan served as First Deputy Minister of Defence of Armenia, serving under Seyran Ohanyan and Vigen Sargsyan. On 6 February 2017, he was appointed Minister of Emergency Situations.

=== Defence minister ===
Prime Minister Nikol Pashinyan appointed Tonoyan as defence minister on 11 May 2018, three days after Pashinyan took office.

In late August 2020, Tonoyan proposed the creation of a national militia in light of the July 2020 Armenian–Azerbaijani clashes, in order to prepare the society to threats of military nature. The Ministry of Defence under his leadership introduced a draft law into the National Assembly creating the militia, which would be open to both men and women and people up to the age of 70, as well as would be organized under local governments, potentially including up to 100,000 members.

==== Second Nagorno-Karabakh War and resignation ====
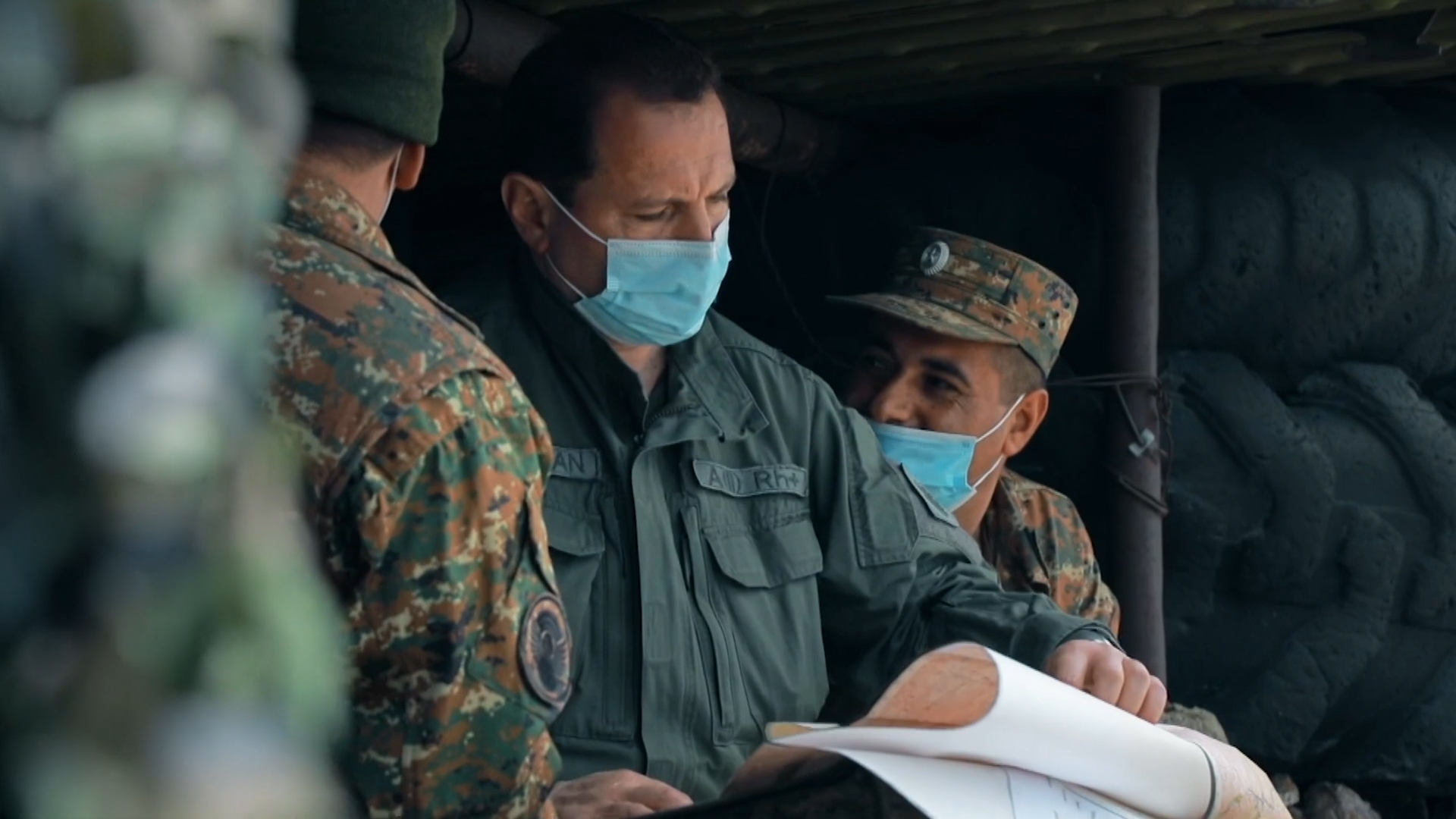
David Tonoyan on the front line during the Second Nagorno-Karabakh war

In March 2019, at a gathering of Armenian community representatives in New York, Tonoyan declared that "I, as the Defence Minister, say that the option of return of ‘territories for peace’ will no longer exist, and I have re-formulated it into ’new territories in the event of a new war’", criticizing the Madrid Principles which envisioned the peaceful return of the territories surrounding Nagorno-Karabakh to Azerbaijani control. This statement, later popularized as "new war for new territories", was widely criticized and regarded as one of the provocations that ruled out negotiations on Nagorno-Karabakh and later caused Second Nagorno-Karabakh war, which resulted in Azerbaijan taking control of the territories surrounding Nagorno-Karabakh, Shusha, Hadrut region, Madagiz, Talish and other parts of the former NKAO.

After the 2020 Nagorno-Karabakh ceasefire agreement was signed, he denied rumors he sold arms to pro-Turkish militants in Syria via a private company, allegations of which appeared in the Armenian media. Related accusations that were also denied was the claim that it turned down an offer to purchase body armor jackets from Russia as well as the claim that Tonoyan was in the Maldives to attend a relative’s birthday party when the war started.

On 20 November 2020 he tendered his resignation. In his farewell address, he apologized to those who lost loved ones during the war.

=== Arrest ===
On 30 September 2021, Tonoyan was arrested by the National Security Service of Armenia and accused of fraud and embezzlement causing nearly 2.3 billion Armenian drams ($4.7 million) worth of damage to the state together with arms dealer Davit Galstyan.

== Personal life ==
He is currently married and has two children. He is fluent in Russian, English, and French. He is a master of sports in judo.

== Awards ==
- Order "For Services to the Fatherland"
- Medal "For Meritorious Service"
- Vazgen Sargsyan Medal
- Andranik Ozanyan Medal

Political offices
Preceded by Vigen Sargsyan	Defence Minister of Armenia; 2018–2020	Succeeded by Vagharshak Harutiunyan
