= Police of Armenia =

National police of Armenia

Police of Armenia Հայաստանի ոստիկանություն
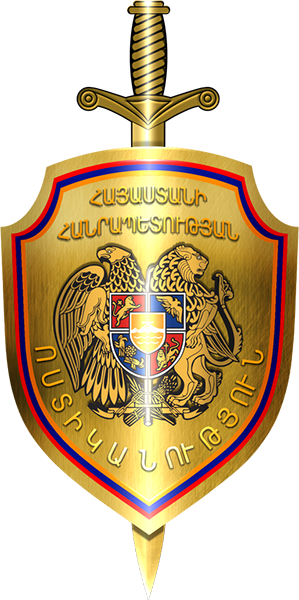
- Emblem of the Police of Armenia
- Common name: Police of Armenia
- Abbreviation: Armenian Police

Agency overview
- Formed: 2002

Operational structure
- Headquarters: 130 Nalbandyan St Yerevan
- Agency executive: Aram Hovhannisyan, Chief of Police
- Parent agency: Ministry of Internal Affairs of Armenia
- Child agencies: Criminal Police; General Department of Community Police; Police Guard; Patrol Service

Website
- police.am

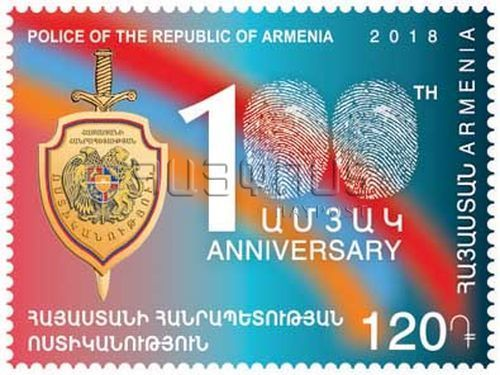
A 2018 stamp dedicated to the 100th anniversary of the Police of Armenia, featuring its logo to the left

The Police of Armenia (Armenian: Հայաստանի ոստիկանություն, romanized: Hayastani vostikanut’yun) is the national police of Armenia.

== History ==
=== Soviet era ===
The first police service of Armenia was formed in 1918, under the Ministry of Internal Affairs of the First Republic of Armenia. On April 21, 1920, a Militia was formed in Yerevan based on the Soviet model. It was later renamed to the People's Commissariat of Internal Affairs of the Armenian SSR or the NKVD of the Armenian SSR, which was the Armenian subordinate to the NKVD headquarters in Moscow. In 1929, the NKVD of the Armenian SSR was dissolved and was reestablished in July 1934 as a reorganized political department. During World War II, the present-day building of the Armenian Police was built. The Armenian Regiment of Interior Forces of the USSR Ministry of Internal Affairs was established in 1963, and the Headquarters of the Ministry of Internal Affairs of the Armenian SSR was founded in 1965.

=== Modern Armenia ===
On June 21, 1992, by order of President Levon Ter-Petrosyan, the Ministry of Internal Affairs of Armenia was formed from the former Soviet Internal Troops. The ministry was active until December 2002, when the ministry, along with the Ministry of National Security, was reorganised into a non-ministerial institution, with the Ministry of Internal Affairs becoming the Police of Armenia. The Armenian Ministry of Justice recommended the re-establishment of the ministry headed by a cabinet member in a three-year strategy of police reforms proposed to the government in 2019. As part of a major structural reform of the national police service, Prime Minister Nikol Pashinian announced plans to recreate the Interior Ministry. A patrol service became active in June 2021.

On 16 September 2021, the Armenian Government signed a strategic cooperation agreement with Europol.

On 25 January 2024, a more complex cooperation agreement with Europol was ratified by the Armenian government. The agreement will facilitate the deployment of a liaison officer from Armenia's Ministry of Internal Affairs to Europol, enhancing operational collaboration and information exchange between Armenia and Europol. On 2 February 2024, Deputy Minister of Internal Affairs, Police Chief Major General Aram Hovhannisyan held meetings with Europol Executive Director Catherine De Bolle and CEPOL Executive Director Montserrat Marín López. The sides discussed the implementation of the provisions of the agreement signed between the Armenian police and Europol, as well as joining the SIENA system, among other issues of mutual interest.

== Leadership ==
The activities of the police are directed by the chief of the police, who is appointed by the president of Armenia at the nomination of the prime minister of Armenia. The chief has one first deputy and several deputies, appointed by the president upon nomination by the chief.

The commander of the police troops is appointed by the president and serves as ex officio deputy chief of the police. Each of the deputy chiefs is assigned a sphere of responsibility by the chief of police, who is also assisted by a group of Advisers.

=== List of leaders (since 2003) ===
- Hayk Haroutyunyan (January 2003 – May 29, 2008)
- Alik Sargsyan (May 29, 2008 – November 1, 2011)
- Vladimir Gasparyan (November 1, 2011 – May 10, 2018)
- Valeri Osipyan (May 10, 2018 – September 19, 2019)
- Arman Sargsyan (September 19, 2019 – June 8, 2020)
- Vahe Ghazaryan (June 8, 2020 – January 9, 2023)
- Aram Hovhannisyan (January 9, 2023 – June 2, 2025)

== Central Body and Regional Divisions ==
The Police are organised into the Central Body, and 11 geographic divisions. There is one police department for the city of Yerevan, and one for each of the 10 Provinces. The Departments of the Central Body are:

- Police of Armenia
  - Headquarters
  - Combating Organized Crime Main Department
  - Criminal Investigations Main Department
  - Investigative Main Department
  - Public Order Department
  - Personnel Department
  - Information Centre
  - Public Relations and Press Department
  - Finances and Economic Affairs Department
  - Administration
  - Department of Road Inspection
  - Passports and Visas Department
  - State Protection Department
  - Criminal Forensics and Legal Affairs Department
  - National Central Bureau (NCB) of Interpol

=== National Central Bureau ===
The NCB is divided into three divisions:

- Division for international search and general crime – responsible for conducting criminal investigations of an operational nature, preparing international notice requests and sending them to the General Secretariat for publication, providing liaison and co-ordination activities, maintaining criminal records, implementing criminal investigations concerning the search for wanted persons. The division comprises 6 police officers including a head of division.
- Division for the analysis and processing of criminal intelligence – division deals with the following areas: legal matters, analysis and processing of criminal intelligence on drug trafficking, fraud, organized crime, terrorism, corruption, counterfeiting, crimes against human beings, international relations support, general reference sources, methodological data, etc. It comprises 6 police officers including a head of division.
- Division for telecommunications and technical support – division deals with matters relating to information technology systems, providing telecommunications services and technical support for the NCB. It consists of 7 police officers including a head of division.

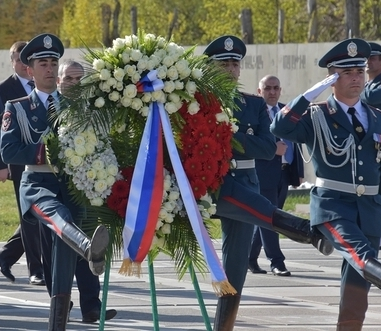
Armenian Police Honor Guard.

=== Public Relations and Press Department ===
The Committee of Public Relations (part of the Public Relations and Press Department) was founded on 21 March 1994.

The department also maintains a 42-member Police Band (Հայաստանի ոստիկանության նվագախումբը, Vostikanutyan Nvagaxumb) based in Yerevan which is currently led by Baghdasar Grigoryan. The band was created on 1 August 1972. It performs similar functions to the Band of the Armenian Army General Staff, taking part in the most important events of the police and the state. In 2019, it performed at the graduation party of Dubai Police Academy.

== Special Operations Forces ==
The Special Operations Forces took part in the "Cobalt-2016" joint exercise of special forces units of the CSTO at the Marshal Baghramyan Training Ground of the Ministry of Defense.

== Personnel ==
=== Oath ===
Persons serving in the Police, in front of the state flag of Armenia, in accordance with the procedure established by the Government of Armenia, take an oath with the following content:

"I (name, patronymic, surname), taking service in the Police of the Republic of Armenia, swear:

To be faithful to the constitutional order of the Republic of Armenia, to be unconditionally governed by laws, to defend my homeland, to keep state and official secrets.

To exercise my powers fairly and impartially, to perform my official duties honestly and conscientiously."

=== Uniforms ===
Decrees passed in October 2002 and April 2003 set the rules for police officers' uniforms.

=== Police Workers Day ===
Celebrated on 16 April, Police Workers Day (Armenian: Ոստիկանության օր) in Armenia commemorates personnel of the Police Central Body and the Police Troops. It was first celebrated in 2002 and was introduced year earlier by the National Assembly of Armenia. Traditionally, the President of Armenia and/or the Prime Minister of Armenia receives the salute at a ceremony in the Yerevan police headquarters.

=== Ranks ===
Police ranks are classified into the following groups:

- Higher ranks
  - Colonel General of Police
  - Lieutenant General of Police
  - Major General of Police
- Chief ranks
  - Police Colonel
- Senior ranks
  - Police Lieutenant Colonel
- Subaltern ranks
  - Police Major
  - Police Captain
  - Senior Police Lieutenant
  - Police Lieutenant
- Junior ranks
  - Senior Police NCO
  - Police NCO
  - Police Starshina
  - Senior Police Sergeant
  - Police Sergeant
  - Junior Police Sergeant

=== Education ===
The Police Academy of Armenia, is the successor to the Secondary School of the Internal Troops of the Ministry of Internal Affairs, which was founded in 1984. During the Soviet era, the Yerevan Higher School of the Ministry of Internal Affairs operated in the country.

== Equipment ==
Police personnel are armed primarily with Soviet-made firearms and ammunition, including Makarov PM and Tokarev TT-33 handguns, and AKS, AKM, and AK-74 automatic rifles.

=== Small arms ===
Name	Origin	Type	Photo
Pistols and submachine guns
MP-443 Grach	Russia	9×19mm	
Glock	Austria	9×19mm	
M1911	United States	.45 ACP	
Makarov	Soviet Union	9×18mm	
Tokarev TT-33	Soviet Union	9×19mm	
AK-74U	Soviet Union	5.45×39 mm	
Assault Rifles
AK-74M	Russia	5.45×39 mm	
AK-74	Soviet Union	5.45×39 mm	
AKS-74	Soviet Union	5.45×39 mm	
AKM	Soviet Union	7.62×39 mm	
Sniper rifles
Dragunov SVD	Soviet Union	7.62×54 mm	

=== Vehicles ===
Name	Origin	Type	Photo	Notes
Vehicles and Aircraft
Škoda Octavia	Czech Republic	Patrol Car		The latest models issued to the traffic police also known as Patrol. Slowly replacing Toyota Corolla and Camry models.
Toyota Corolla	Japan	Patrol Car		Used as primaries.
Toyota Camry	Japan	Patrol Car		Used as secondaries.
Kia Forte / Cadenza	South Korea	Patrol Car		Gifted by South Korea to the Armenian Patrol Sentry Service Regiment.
Chevrolet Sonic / Aveo	United States	Patrol Car		General Department of State Protection of the Police.
Hyundai Elantra	South Korea	Patrol Car		Used also by the Military Police.
Lada VAZ	Soviet Union	Patrol Car		Currently being replaced. A few are still in service.
Lada Priora	Russia	Patrol Car		Used in rare situations.
IKCO	Iran	Patrol Car		Used by some units, being replaced widely.
Dodge Charger	Canada	Patrol Car		Tested in 2019. 300 units being delivered. Not seen in the public.
Ford Crown Victoria	Canada	Patrol Car		As of 2020 there are 10 vehicles in service in Yerevan only; rarely used.
Toyota Prado	Japan	Police SUV		Used as a VIP transport. Old variants used by patrol and special units.
Hyundai Tucson	South Korea	Police SUV		
UAZ-469	Soviet Union	Police SUV		Used mostly in rural areas.
Chevrolet Niva	RussiaUnited States	Police SUV		Distributed to different divisions.
UAZ Patriot	Russia	Police SUV		Used in support roles.
Toyota C-HR	Japan	Police SUV		New in service.
Chevrolet Tahoe	United States	Unmarked Vehicle		Unmarked.
Mercedes-Benz G-Class	Germany	Unmarked Vehicle		Used as VIP transport.
Chevrolet Express	United States	Transportation Vehicle		Unmarked transportation vehicle. Also used as prisoner transport.
Hyundai Starex	South Korea	Transportation Vehicle		Used by the Armenian Patrol Sentry Service Regiment.
GAZelle	Russia	Transportation Vehicle		Used by specialized units. Some unmarked.
Toyota Hiace	Japan	Transportation Vehicle		Support roles.
UAZ-452	Soviet Union	Transportation Vehicle		Mostly used in support roles.
Volkswagen Transporter	Germany	Transportation Vehicle		Limited use.
PAZ-3205	Soviet Union	Transportation Vehicle		Used for riot roles and transport.
Ural-4320	Soviet Union	Transport / Cargo Truck		Few converted to riot trucks.
KamAZ-43501	Russia	Transport / Cargo Truck		Very limited usage.
CNHTC Riot Control	China	Riot Control Vehicle		Fitted with armored and riot equipment. Used for riot control.
GMC Grumman	United States	Riot Control Vehicle		Fitted with armored and riot equipment. Used for riot control and prisoner transport.
GAZ-2975 "Tigr"	Russia	Armored Vehicle		Used by special forces, riot police, and rapid response units.
BTR-80	Soviet Union	Armored Personnel Carrier		Used for riot control and counter-terrorism. Most APCs have their guns replaced with water cannons.
BRDM-2	Soviet Union	Armored Personnel Carrier		Used for riot control. Guns replaced with water cannons.
Mi-8	Soviet Union	Transport Helicopter		Few used by the Armenian Police for transport.
Eurocopter EC130	France	Transport Helicopter		Few used for transporting and other operations.
Eurocopter EC635 / EC 135	France	Transport Helicopter		Few used for transporting and other operations.

== See also ==
- Crime in Armenia
- Law of Armenia
- Ministry of Justice (Armenia)
- National Security Service (Armenia)
- Prosecutor General of Armenia

== Links ==
- Official Website
- POLICE RA Vostikanutyun on YouTube
- Performances of the Police Band in 2017 and 2018
- The Police Honour Guard
