= Ministry of Territorial Administration and Infrastructure =

Government ministry of Armenia

Ministry of Territorial Administration and Infrastructure of Armenia
- Հայաստանի տարածքային կառավարման և ենթակառուցվածքների նախարարություն

Agency overview
- Formed: 1995
- Jurisdiction: Government of Armenia
- Headquarters: Government Building 3, Yerevan 0010, Yerevan
- Minister responsible: Davit Khudatyan
- Agency executives: Hakob Vardanyan, Deputy Minister; Armen Simonyan, Deputy Minister; Vache Terteryan, Deputy Minister; Hovhannes Harutyunyan, Deputy Minister; Narek Manukyan, Deputy Minister; Kristine Ghalechyan, Deputy Minister
- Website: www.mtad.am/

The Ministry of Territorial Administration and Infrastructure of Armenia (Armenian: Հայաստանի տարածքային կառավարման և ենթակառուցվածքների նախարարություն) is a republican body of executive authority, which elaborates and implements the government's policy in the field of local governance and infrastructures.

The current minister is Davit Khudatyan. This Ministry also oversees the National Archives of Armenia and the Civil Aviation Committee.

== Ministers ==
The first Minister of Territorial Administration of the Republic of Armenia was appointed in 1995. The title of the position of ministers has changed frequently, depending on their powers .

No.	Photo	Minister	Term Start	Term End	Political affiliation	Ref
1		Rubik Barseghyan	1995	1996	Independent	
2		Galust Gamazyan	1996	1998	Independent	
3		Gagik Martirosyan (acting)	1998	1998	Independent	
4		David Zadoyan	1998	1999	Independent	
5		Khosrov Harutyunyan	1999	2000	Christian Democratic Union of Armenia	
6		Leonid Hakobyan	2000	2000	Independent	
7		Hovik Abrahamyan	2000	2008	Independent	
8		Armen Gevorgyan	2008	2014	Independent	
9		Armen Yeritsyan	2014	2016	Orinats Yerkir	
10		David Lokyan	2016	2018	Armenian Revolutionary Federation	
11		Suren Papikyan	2018	2021	Civil Contract	
12		Gnel Sanosyan	2021	2024	Civil Contract	
13		Davit Khudatyan	2024	Present		
