= Lusakert =

Lusakert may refer to:

- Argel, Armenia
- Arevshat, Armenia
- Lusakert, Shirak, Armenia
- Lusakert, Ararat, Armenia
