= 4th Army Corps (Armenia) =

- 4-րդ բանակային կորպուս
- Active: July 1997–present
- Country: Armenia
- Branch: Armenian Ground Forces
- Type: Field army
- Part of: Ministry of Defence of Armenia
- HQ: Yeghegnadzor

Commanders
- Commander: Colonel Artak Budaghyan

The 4th Army Corps (Armenian: 4-րդ բանակային կորպուս) is a regional military formation the Armenian Army, located in the capital of the Vayots Dzor Province.

== Overview ==
The corps was founded in July 1997. By decree of President Robert Kocharyan on 23 January 2002, the army corps was given a battle flag. In recent years, it has been focused on repelling any type of attack from the Azerbaijani Nakhchivan Autonomous Republic, and specifically the Nakhchivan Garrison. There have been speculation that alongside the United Group of Forces, the 4th Corps could be integrated into Russia’s Southern Military District.

== Structure ==
It has four independent motor rifle regiments (including the 527th Motorized Rifle Regiment at Vayk), an independent self-propelled artillery battalion, and one signals battalion:

=== Motorized Rifle Regiment named after Vazgen Sargsyan ===
The separate motorized rifle regiment named after National Hero of Armenia Vazgen Sargsyan was established on 21 May 1996 by the order of the Ministry of Defense. On 14 February 2000, the regiment was given a battle flag. The regiment was commanded by Colonel Murad Kirakosyan, Colonel Roland Keleshyan, Colonel Tigran Keshishyan, Colonel Suren Gorgyan, Major General Alexan Aleksanyan, Colonel Grigory Khachaturov, Lieutenant Colonel Hovik Hayrapetyan, Colonel Manvel Mirzakhanyan and Colonel Arthur Ohanyan.

=== Motorized Rifle Regiment ===
A separate motorized rifle regiment was established on 25 May 1996. On 19 January 2002, the regiment was given a battle flag. The regiment was commanded by Colonel Vagif Hambardzumyan, Major General Hovik Ohanyan, Colonel Tigran Parvanyan, and Colonel Arayik Muradyan.

=== Separate "N" Motorized Rifle Regiment ===
The "N" motorized rifle regiment (currently led by Colonel Alessandr Tsakanyan) was formed on 4 March 1994. On 21 September of the following year, the regiment was given a battle flag. The regiment was commanded by Colonel Hovik Azoyan, Colonel Albert Karamyan, Colonel Andranik Piloyan, Colonel Tigran Parvanyan, and Colonel Arthur Sargsyan.

=== Motorized Rifle Regiment named after Garegin Nzhdeh ===
A separate motorized rifle regiment named after Garegin Nzhdeh was established on 2 September 1993. On 19 July 2001, the regiment was given a battle flag. The regimental commanders were Colonel Jond Hovhannisyan, Colonel Seryozha Stepanyan, Colonel Hamlet Tangamyan, Major General Aris Brutyan, Colonel Vahan Vardanyan, and Colonel Vigen Avagyan.

=== Mixed Artillery Division ===
A separate mixed artillery division was established on 14 May 1996. On 15 September 2011, the division was given a battle flag. The division commanders were Colonel Sedrak Sedrakyan, Lieutenant Colonel Hovik Hokhikyan, Major Vakhtang Zakaryan, and Lieutenant Colonel Gorg Gorgyan.

=== Signals Battalion ===
A signals battalion was established on 24 June 2000. On 15 September 2011, the battalion was given a battle flag. The battalion commanders were Captain Arthur Aleksanyan, Lieutenant Colonel Ara Sargsyan, Lieutenant Colonel Andranik Manukyan, and Lieutenant Colonel Nikol Khojoyan.

== Commanders ==
The following have served as commanders of the corps:

- Colonel General Yuri Khachaturov (1997-2000)
- Lieutenant General Martin Karapetyan
- Major General Seyran Saroyan
- Lieutenant General Arshaluys Paytyan
- Major General Valeri Grigoryan (20 July 2007-26 January 2009)
- Major General Kamo Kochunts (26 January 2009-12 August 2010)
- Major General Poghos Poghosyan (12 August 2010-June 2013)
- Major General Andranik Makaryan (June 2013-July 2016)
- Colonel Artak Budaghyan (since December 2019)
