= 1st Army Corps (Armenia) =

- 1-ին բանակային կորպուս
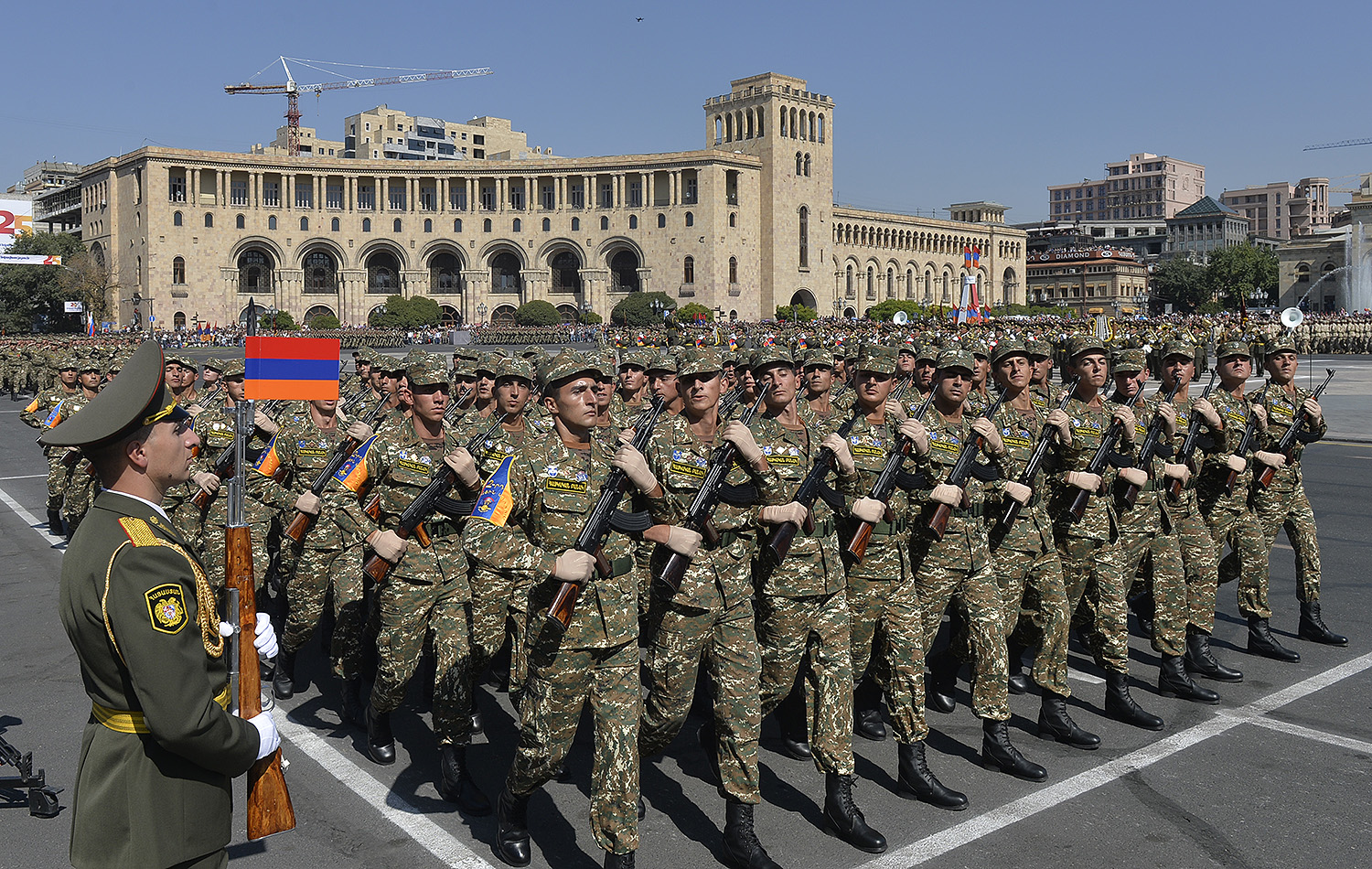
- The 1st Army Corps at the military parade dedicated to the 25th anniversary of Armenia’s Independence in 2016.
- Active: 20 June 1996–present
- Country: Armenia
- Branch: Armenian Ground Forces
- Type: Field army
- Part of: Ministry of Defence of Armenia
- HQ: Khachaghbyur
- Engagements: July 2020 Armenian–Azerbaijani clashes

Commanders
- Commander: Major General Jirayr Poghosyan

The 1st Army Corps (Armenian: 1-ին բանակային կորպուս), also known as the 1st Military Unit, is a regional military formation of the Armenian Army, located in the city of Khachaghbyur in Gegharkunik Province. It helps make up Armenia's southeastern military positions.

== Overview ==
After the First Nagorno-Karabakh War, the development of army building imposed the need to form large military units. This resulted in the corps creation on 20 June 1996 at the initiative of General Yuri Khatchaturov. A tank crew of the corps participated in the "Tank Biathlon-2017" international competition. In September 2020, a subdivision of the corps participated in the "Caucasus-2020" command-staff military exercise in Russia. During the Second Nagorno-Karabakh War, the corps was deployed in the Aghdara District. The Azerbaijani Ministry of Defence indicated that the corps was one of three units with white phosphorus in their possession.

== Structure ==
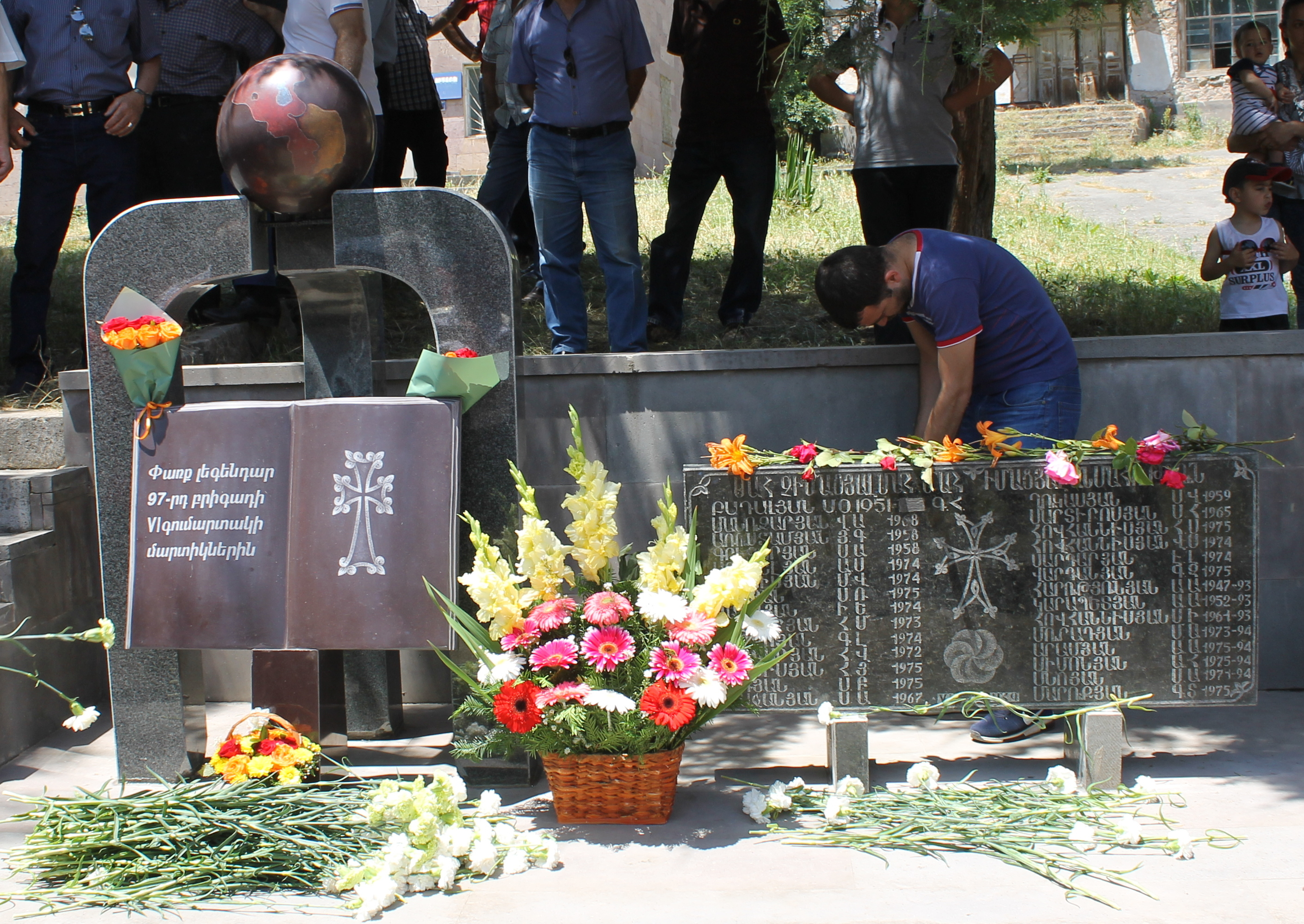
A monument dedicated to the memory of the missing servicemen of the 6th Motorized Rifle Battalion of the 97th Kapan Brigade.

The corps has the following structure:

- Headquarters (Goris)
- 2nd Independent Motorized Rifle Brigade "Vardan Mamikonian" (Goris, previously partially stationed in Karakhanbeyli)
- 14th Independent Motorized Rifle Regiment (Kapan, made up of the former 83rd Motor Rifle Brigade and the 97th Independent Motorized Rifle Brigade)
- 522nd Motorized Rifle Regiment (Sisian)
- 539th Motorized Rifle Regiment (Agarak)
- 155th Artillery Regiment
- 25th Independent Tank Battalion
- 585th Independent Reconnaissance Battalion
- Logistics Battalion
- 1st Army Corps Concert Orchestra (conducted by Captain Samvel Hayrapetyan)

Other small units include the 5th Mountain Rifle Regiment of the 10th Mountain Rifle Division.

== Commanders ==
The following have served as commanders of the corps:

- Colonel General Yuri Khachaturov (1996 – 1997)
- Lieutenant General Manvel Grigoryan (1996 – 2000)
- Major General Leon Yeranosyan (– 8 October 2003)
- Major General Garegin Gabrielyan (8 October 2003 – 20 July 2007)
- Colonel Poghos Poghosyan (20 July 2007 – 2010)
- Major General Kamo Aghajanyan (2010 – 21 March 2013)
- Major General Tigran Parvanyan (21 March 2013 – 16 February 2018)
- Ararat Melkumyan (16 February 2018 – 18 June 2018)
- Major General Jirayr Poghosyan (18 June 2018 – present)
