= Arpavar =

Arpavar may refer to:

- Arevshat, Armenia
- Lusakert, Ararat, Armenia
