= 2nd Independent Motorized Rifle Brigade =

- Active: 1 March 1992–present
- Country: Armenia
- Branch: Armenian Ground Forces
- Type: Motorized infantry
- Part of: 1st Army Corps
- HQ: Goris
- Nickname(s): 2nd Goris Brigade
- Engagements: Operation Horadiz

The 2nd Independent Motorized Rifle Brigade "Vardan Mamikonian" (Armenian: 2-րդ մոտոհրաձգային բրիգադը), also known as Military Unit 60369 (Armenian: 60369 զորամասի) is a military formation of the Armenian Army, located in the city of Goris in the Syunik Province. It is also partially stationed in Karakhanbeyli. It is part of the 1st Army Corps of the Armenian Ground Forces.

== History ==
The military unit was formed on 1 March 1992, receiving the conventional name of 60369 and being located in Lusakert. On 16 February 1993, the brigade moved to Syunik. On 18 September 1995, the brigade received a battle flag for its major achievements in army building and combat readiness. The former 2nd Motorized Rifle Brigade was renamed the 2nd Independent Motorized Rifle Brigade on 21 July 2000. On 26 January 2006, it was awarded the "Vardan Mamikonyan" Order by the decree of President Robert Kocharyan.

During the Nagorno-Karabakh conflict, it took part in the protection of the borders of Armenia and the Artsakh Republic. In total, the unit had 164 fallen servicemen, 10 missing and about 500 wounded. Many decorated servicemen from the brigade have been awarded the Order of the First Degree of Combat, and departmental medals for their courage and bravery on the battlefield.

== Commanders ==
The following have served as commanders of the unit:

- Yuri Khatchaturov (1993-1994)l
- Lieutenant Colonel Tigran Avetisyan (circa 2009)
- Colonel Levon Hovhannisyan (circa 2017)
