= Arsen Panosyan =

Armenian ornament painter

Arsen Panosyan ( Armenian: Արսեն Փանոսյան) (September 27, 1940 – July 7, 2012) was an Armenian ornament painter, wood carver, Khachqar sculptor and painter.

== Biography ==
Arsen Panosyan was born in the village of Argel (Lusakert) in Kotayk province, Armenia.
He started woodcarving as a young child with the assistance and mentorship of the famous sculptor and his uncle Hovsep Margaryan. Studying Armenian classic decoration art and engraving techniques, he created his own style of ornaments and started making multilayered woodcarving.
For three times, Arsen Panosyan and his sons various works of art have been awarded gold medals in international contests that took place in a variety of prestigious museums and private collections. On 1950s, with his works Arsen Panosyan is participating in foundation of museum of folk art of Yerevan.
Studying cross-stones art (khachqar), on 1980s boys begin to deal with cross-stones art, creating both classical and new, his unique style cross.

In 1998, in his native village of Argel, Panosyan unselfishly built in memory of fallen soldiers during the Artsakh war a cross-stone complex, and in 2001 donated to the village a cross-stone memorial, consisting of 15 stones, called "Christian Armenia", devoted to the celebration of 1700th anniversary of adoption of Christianity in Armenia.

In the cities of Bremen, Braunschweig, Moscow and Lyon his cross stones immortalize the memory of the innocent victims of the Armenian genocide.

Arsen Panosyan's cross stones dedicated to the memories of the fallen soldiers can be found in different communities in Armenia and Artsakh. The Master's numerous stone crosses are also found in the courtyards of the Armenian churches.

In 2004, he was awarded the “Movses Khorenatsi” medal, and in 2010, he was decorated with the “St. Nerses Shnorhali” medal.

During more than his 50 years of creative works of arts, Arsen Panosyan, (later with his two sons, Artur and Paruyr) participated in various international exhibitions and award winning festivals, created more than 300 wood carvings and more than 150 cross stones.

== Others about Arsen Panosyan ==
«Master Arsen's works are initially created within soul and later are shaped by hand.»
Ara Vahuni

«I watch and am in awe... how our people with so little patience gave birth to a man of such great patience "Arsen Panosyan"the wizard of the art of woodcarving....Bless him!»
Shahen Kachatryan

«With his art, Panosyan continues and maintains the unique, the beautiful, the good trend in the art of the Armenian people.»
Grigor Khanjyan

«Panosyan worked with wood, as Paganini with his violin.»
Sergey Galstyan

== Gallery ==
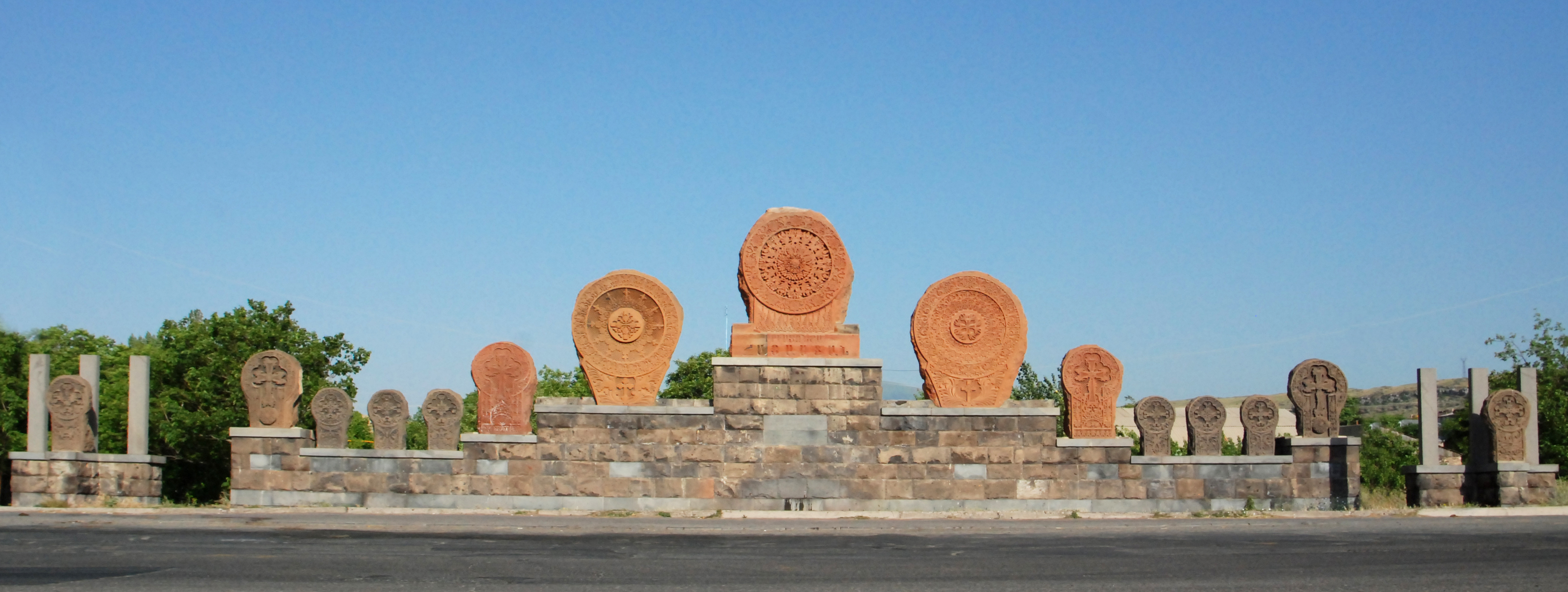
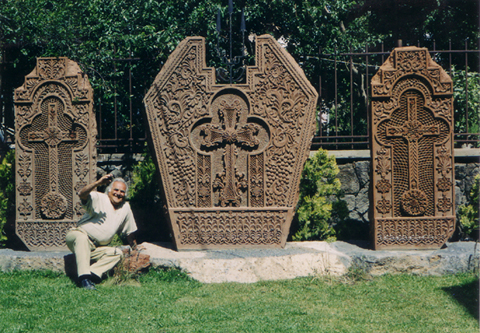
