= Manvel Grigoryan =

Armenian military commander and politician (1956–2020)

Lieutenant General Manvel Grigoryan
- Մանվել Գրիգորյան
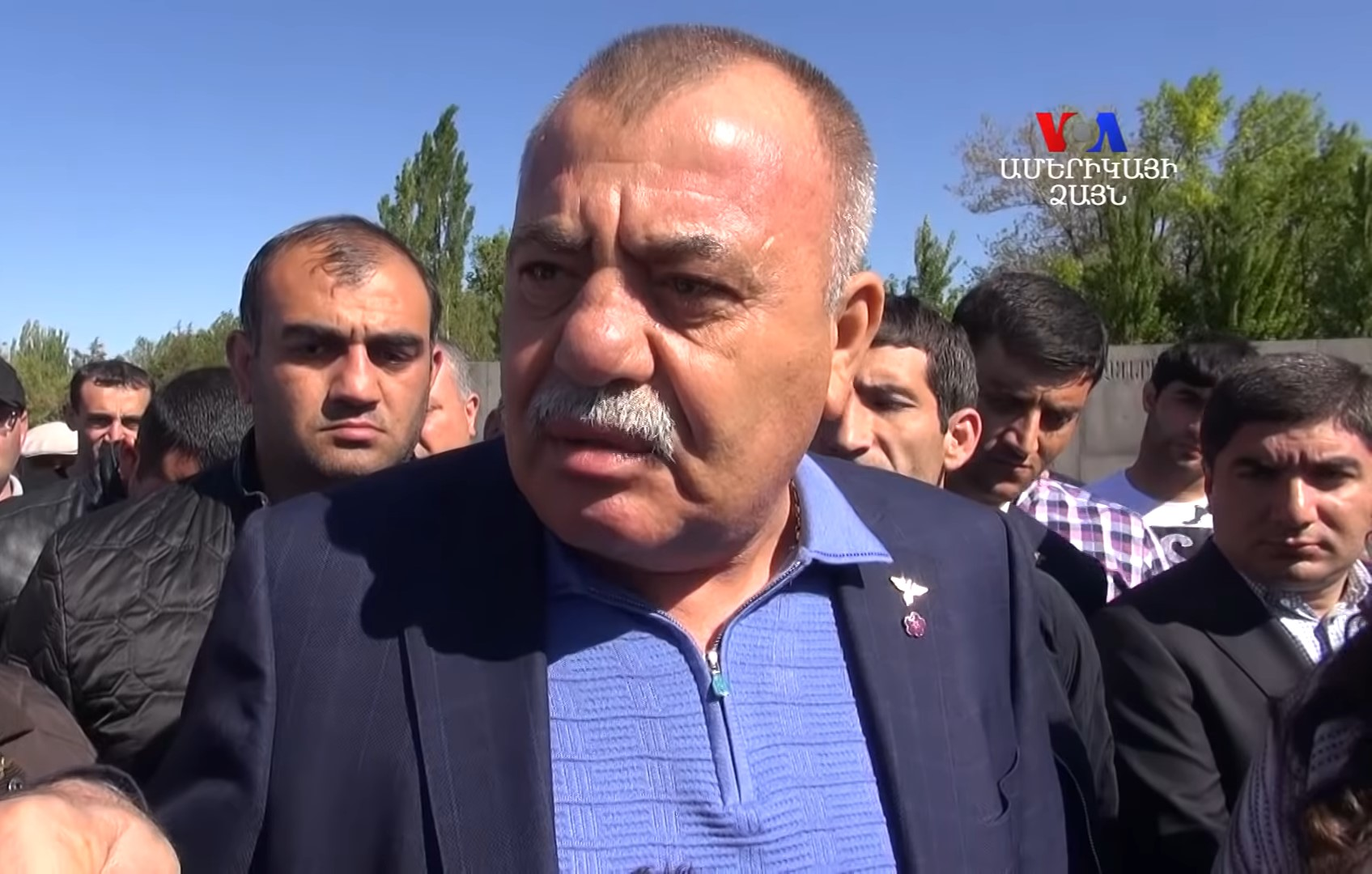
- Grigoryan in 2018
- Born: 14 July 1956; Arshaluys, Armavir Province, Armenian SSR, Soviet Union
- Died: 19 November 2020 (aged 64); Yerevan, Armenia
- Children: 8
- Military career
- Allegiance: USSR; Armenia
- Branch: Soviet Army; Armed Forces of Armenia
- Service years: 1975–2020
- Rank: Lieutenant General
- Commands: Ejmiatsin Volunteer Battalion (1992–1993); 83rd Motorized Rifle Brigade (1993–1996); 1st Army Corps (1996–2000)
- Conflicts: First Nagorno-Karabakh War; Terter operation
- Awards: Hero of Artsakh

Lieutenant General Manvel Sektori Grigoryan (Armenian: Մանվել Սեկտորի Գրիգորյան; 14 July 1956 – 19 November 2020) was an Armenian military leader and a member of the National Assembly of Armenia.

At one point he was one of the highest-ranking officials in the Armenian Army, serving as Deputy Minister of Defense from 2000 to 2008. He served as the president of the Yerkrapah Volunteer Union from 1999 to 2018.

== Early life and First Karabakh War ==
Manvel Grigoryan was born on 14 July 1956 in the village of Arshaluys in Armavir province. He served in the Soviet Army from 1975 to 1977. He graduated from Stepanakert State University in 1993 and Yerevan State University in 1998. During the First Nagorno-Karabakh War, he commanded Armenian forces in the defense of Hadrut, the retaking of the region of Martakert, and the capture of Fuzuli. He commanded the Ejmiatsin Volunteer Battalion from 1992 to 1993. In 1993 he was appointed commander of the 83rd Motorized Rifle Brigade. Between 1996 and 2000 he was appointed commander of the 1st Army Corps of the Ministry of Defense and gained the rank of major general. It was in this capacity he commanded the parade on Republic Square in Yerevan in honor of the 8th anniversary of independence. In 1999, he became the president of the Yerkrapah Volunteer Union. In 2000, Grigoryan was appointed deputy defense minister and received the rank of lieutenant general.

On 18 June 2018, the Ministry of Foreign Affairs of Azerbaijan accused Manvel of participating in Khojaly Massacre and committing other war crimes. According to a report by the Hetq investigative online newspaper made in 2014, Grigoryan owned significant properties and businesses, particularly in his hometown of Arshaluys and in nearby Vagharshapat where he resided, many of which were not registered in his name and for which he did not pay the majority of taxes. Human rights activists like Larisa Alaverdyan who during the years of the war in Karabakh was engaged in the exchange of prisoners accused Grigoryan of breaching Geneva Conventions. Grigoryan responded that "during war nobody had time to read Geneva conventions."

== Politics ==
During the protests following the disputed 2008 Armenian presidential election, there were expectations that Grigoryan and another deputy defense minister, Gagik Melkonyan, would encourage the army and the Yerkrapah Volunteer Union to intervene in favor of the protestors led by ex-president Levon Ter-Petrosyan. Ter-Petrosyan declared on 21 February 2008 that he had met with Grigoryan and Gagik Melkonyan and that they had agreed to join the protestors. The protests were suppressed using the army on 1 March 2008, resulting in the deaths of 10 people. Then president-elect Serzh Sargsyan stated on 13 March 2008 that he was "deeply regretful and hurt that he [Manvel Grigoryan] made an attempt to enter politics and disobey his commander-in-chief." On 2 April 2008, Grigoryan was dismissed from the post of deputy defense minister by President Robert Kocharyan. In an interview given in 2012, Grigoryan stated that although there were people who tried to involve the Yerkrapah Union in political processes during the 2008 protests, he worked to keep the Yerkrapah Union out of politics at the time.

On 6 May 2012, he was elected a deputy to the parliament from the Republican Party of Armenia. During his tenure, Grigoryan was a close ally of Sedrak Saroyan, and the pair were described as being like "Siamese twins".

== Allegations of violations during the First Nagorno-Karabakh War ==
In November 2014, Grigoryan stated in an exchange with journalists from the Armenian service of Radio Free Europe/Radio Liberty that he had brought "hundreds" of Azerbaijani prisoners of war to Armenia during the First Nagorno-Karabakh War, one of whom he had kept at his personal residence in Vagharshapat for two years. He said that he later sent the prisoner back to Azerbaijan via the Red Cross. Human rights advocates, such as Artur Sakunts of the Helsinki Citizens' Assembly Vanadzor Office and Larisa Alaverdyan, argued that Grigoryan's actions went against Geneva Conventions, according to which prisoners of war cannot be held in private residences but must remain under the control of state authorities. Sakunts called for an investigation into Grigoryan's statements and indicated that he planned to file an appeal to Armenia’s Prosecutor General’s Office to begin an investigation. Alaverdyan stated that there were instances of private individuals holding prisoners during the war on both sides but that these were violations of international law. Responding to questions about the incident, Grigoryan defended his actions, saying, "when Azerbaijan started a war against Karabakh and Armenia, and I and thousands of lads like me voluntarily went to defend our land, we did not have time to read the Geneva Conventions first and then go [...] my Geneva Conventions were my [Christian] faith and my conscience". He asserted that the prisoner that he had kept in his home was treated well.

In June 2018, Azerbaijan’s Ministry of Foreign Affairs commented on Grigoryan's arrest (see below). Hikmet Hajiyev, then head of the ministry's press service, alleged that Grigoryan was involved in multiple war crimes during the Nagorno-Karabakh conflict, such as the looting of Azerbaijani property in Fuzuli and Jabrayil and the torture and killing of prisoners of war and civilians. He also referred to Grigoryan's admission in 2014 of keeping an Azerbaijani prisoner in his personal residence. Hajiyev called for the criminal case against Grigoryan to address these alleged crimes as well.

== Arrest ==
Grigoryan was arrested in Armenia on 16 June 2018 by the National Security Service at his home in Vagharshapat. He was charged with the illegal possession of firearms and ammunition. Prime Minister Nikol Pashinyan also claimed that he stole aid intended for frontline soldiers sent by schoolchildren during the 2016 Nagorno-Karabakh clashes. In his house, the National Security Service also found many weapons and ammunition including, RPG-7s, a car collection which included vehicles and ambulance cars designated for the army. Additionally, a private zoo was discovered, on which premises investigators found used cans of meat products intended for military consumption. Grigoryan was standing trial at the Yerevan Court of General Jurisdiction on the charges of illegal possession and storage of weapons and ammunition, embezzlement of 101,232,917 AMD, evasion of 1,228,176,342 AMD taxes, misuse of 1,225,003,300 AMD state funds and the organization of misappropriation of 37,101,100 AMD worth of property accompanied by extortion. He was released on a bail of 25 million AMD on 21 December 2018, but was arrested again on 22 January 2019. He was released again on 15 January 2020 due to his deteriorating health, and signed an affidavit not to leave the country.

== Death ==
Grigoryan died on November 19, 2020, at the age of 64 during the COVID-19 pandemic in Armenia. Grigoryan had previously been in critical condition after being in Artsakh a week after the start of the Second Nagorno-Karabakh War, where he became infected with COVID-19. Grigoryan was not buried at Yerablur in Yerevan next to Vazgen Sargsyan, which was specified as his last wish, with his former assistant saying that the funeral will be held in his native Arshaluys.

== Personal life ==
He was married to Nazik Amiryan, with whom he had 8 children, including his son Karen Grigoryan, who is the former mayor of Vagharshapat. Over the years of his service, Grigoryan has gained the following national awards:

- Medal of “Military Cross” (1994)
- Medal of the “Golden Eagle” (2000)
- Hero of Artsakh (2000)
- Medal of "Vazgen Sargsyan” (2002)
