= Sedrak Saroyan =

Armenian general and politician (1967–2022)

Major General Sedrak Saroyan MP
- Սեդրակ Սարոյան

Member of Parliament
- In office 2007–2018
- Constituency: District 19 (2007–2017); District 6 (2017–2018)

Personal details
- Born: 3 September 1967 Haykashen, Armenian SSR, Soviet Union
- Died: 13 August 2022 (aged 54) Yerevan, Armenia
- Resting place: Echmiadzin, Armenia
- Party: Independent
- Other political affiliations: Republican Party of Armenia
- Spouse: Karmen Papikyan
- Children: 4
- Education: NATO General Staff Academy; Military Academy of the General Staff of the Armed Forces of Russia

Military service
- Allegiance: Soviet Union; Armenia
- Branch/service: Soviet Army; Armenian Ground Forces
- Years of service: 1985–1987 (Soviet Union); 1992–2007 (Armenia)
- Rank: Major General
- Commands: Artsvik-10 Battalion; 2nd Army Corps; 4th Army Corps
- Battles/wars: First Nagorno-Karabakh War; Battle of Kalbajar; Battle of Ghubatly; Battle of Zangilan

Sedrak Firdusi Saroyan (Armenian: Սեդրակ Ֆիրդուսի Սարոյան; 3 September 1967 – 13 August 2022), also known as Seyran Saroyan, was an Armenian general and politician who served in the Parliament of Armenia from 2007 until his resignation in 2018. During his tenure, Saroyan was an independent politician affiliated with the Republican Party of Armenia. Prior to entering politics, Saroyan was a major general in the Armenian Ground Forces, commanding the 2nd Army Corps during the First Nagorno-Karabakh War.

== Early life and military career ==
Sedrak Saroyan was born on 3 September 1967 in the village of Haykashen in the Armenian Soviet Socialist Republic, then part of the Soviet Union. His father, Firdus Saroyan, was the director of the agricultural department of the city of Etchmiadzin; the main office, a two-story fortified compound, would later become the family's home. After graduating from the local high school in 1984, Saroyan enlisted in the enlisted in the Soviet Army, serving from 1985 until 1987. After leaving the army, he briefly worked as an assistant engineer at a regional firm called Haykimia.

In 1989, Saroyan, a member of the Karabakh movement, recruited and led a detachment of volunteers in the First Nagorno-Karabakh War against Azerbaijan. During the course of the war, the small detachment transformed into a full battalion, the Artsvik-10 operation group. The battalion fought to defend Armenia's border regions and for the "liberation of Artsakh". Saroyan led the battalion in the battles of Kalbajar, Ghubatly, and Zangilan.

In 1992, Saroyan officially joined the Armenian Army, and he was credited with "making a significant contribution to army building and strengthening the army". The following year, he was granted command of the 2nd Army Corps, and at some point he was also granted command of the 4th Army Corps. In 2000, Saroyan was promoted to the rank of major general. Between the late-1990s and the mid-2000s, Saroyan attended several foreign military academies, including the NATO General Staff Academy in Greece and the Military Academy of the General Staff of the Armed Forces of Russia, graduating from the later with a degree in military security.

== Political career ==
On 13 February 2007, Saroyan resigned his command of the 4th Army Corps in order to run for the Parliament of Armenia in the 2007 Armenian parliamentary election. Saroyan stated that he became a politician in order to allow command of the army to pass to a new generation of soldiers and to help fix the socio-economic situation in Armenia. However, he also stated that should Azerbaijani forces invade Armenia, he would be on frontlines of the war. Saroyan successfully contested the 19th electoral district as an independent candidate, though would sit as a member of the ruling Republican Party of Armenia's parliamentary group. Saroyan was re-elected in the 2012 Armenian parliamentary election. In the 2017 Armenian parliamentary election, Saroyan ran in the 6th electoral district, defeating fellow Republican Party MP Arakel Movsisyan and six other candidates to win re-election. While in parliament, Saroyan served as deputy minister of defense and was on the Committee on Defense, National Security and Internal Affairs.

During the 2017 election, an investigation conducted by Hetq, an Armenian newspaper, revealed that Saroyan frequently downplayed how many properties he owned. In addition to his father's home in Etchmiadzin and a luxury home in Yerevan, Saroyan owned several parcels of land in Armenia, as well as homes in the Russian cities of Vsevolozhsk and Sochi. The investigation also revealed that Saroyan also owned several properties near the city of Odesa in Ukraine, including a house that was gifted to him in 2010 which he denied ever owning. In addition to properties, Saroyan also owned several businesses, including a beverage company called Sarkop, which he split ownership of with Russian businessman Yuri Koptyev, and a retail company called S. Saroyan Brothers, Ltd.

During his tenure, Saroyan was a staunch supporter of the RPA status quo and of the military. In 2014, he criticized Gagik Tsarukyan, the leader of Prosperous Armenia, for a statement the latter made on the necessity of a revolution to shift the balance of power in Armenia. The following year, Saroyan was part of a parliamentary delegation to Tbilisi and Jerusalem in order to honor the 100th anniversary of the Armenian genocide. Other members of the delegation included fellow Republican Party MP Manvel Grigoryan, Syunik Province governor Suren Khachatryan, and Armenian ambassador to Georgia Yuri Vardanyan. In 2017, Saroyan opposed the dismissal of Haykaz Baghmanyan, a powerful general who was fired by President Serzh Sargsyan due to allegations of corruption. That year, Saroyan proposed giving aid to seven villages that were affected by a severe hailstorm. In 2018, he opposed a proposal by the Armenian Ministry of Health which would levy a 250,000 AMD (517.61 USD) fine on people who smoked in public. During the 2018 Armenian revolution, Saroyan was opposed to a conciliatory proposal which would have seen opposition leader Nikol Pashinyan become prime minister, stating that it was the duty of the RPA as the ruling party to oppose the opposition's bid for leadership; despite this initial opposition, the RPA conceded and Pashinyan was ultimately elected prime minister.

During his tenure, Saroyan became a close ally of Grigoryan, who had been another general-turned-MP, and the pair were described by the media as "Siamese twins". However, a 2018 investigation by the National Security Service revealed that Grigoryan had stolen multiple crates of military supplies, including food and weapons. Saroyan publicly broke from Grigoryan, praising his arrest and calling for his prosecution, stating that Grigoryan had gone "from a hero to a tushonka thief". However, the following year, Saroyan began to cast doubts on the accusations, stating that the supplies may have been acquired legally.

== Later life and death ==
Later in 2018, Saroyan resigned from parliament, and he left the country to undergo medical treatment in Germany. Upon Saroyan's return to Armenia in August 2019, he was detained for several hours at the airport by police officers enforcing a crackdown on oligarchs. The following day, it was reported in local media outlets that Saroyan's compound in Etchmiadzin was raided by the police for alleged financial crimes. However, Saroyan denied that the police entered his compound, stating that the reporting was disinformation.

After leaving parliament, Saroyan became a supporter of Pashinyan, stating that he was "establishing law and order" in the country. In August 2019, Saroyan expressed his opposition to the ratification by Armenia of the Istanbul Convention, a human rights treaty of the Council of Europe which would establish provisions meant to curb violence against women and domestic violence.

Saroyan was married to Liana Saroyan and had between 2 and 4 children. Saroyan died on 13 August 2022 at the age of 54 at the Izmirlian Medical Center in Yerevan, and was buried in Echmiadzin two days later. Saroyan had been suffering from chronic health issues, particularly issues with his blood vessels.

== Decorations and awards ==
Saroyan was the recipient of the following military decorations and awards:

- Medal of Valor (1994)
- Order of the Combat Cross, 2nd degree (Armenia) (1996)
- "Marshal Baghramyan" Medal (1997)
- Order of the Combat Cross, 2nd degree (Artsakh) (2002)
- "Drastamat Kanayan" Medal (2002)
- Medals for Unimpeachable Service (2003, 2004)
- "Andranik Ozanyan" Medal (2004)
- Medal "For Services to the Motherland", 1st degree (2006)
