= Marshal Baghramyan Training Unit =

Military unit

The Marshal Baghramyan Training Unit (Armenian: ՊՆ մարշալ Հովհաննես Բաղրամյանի անվան զորամաս) is a military unit of the Armed Forces of Armenia subordinate to the Ministry of Defence of Armenia located in the Armavir province. Named after the Marshal of the Soviet Union of Armenian origin Ivan Bagramyan, the unit is responsible for the training of servicemen in the armed forces. The current head is Colonel Arthur Baghramyan.

== Duties ==
According to the former commander, Colonel Gevorg Yenokyan, "commanders, operators, military mechanics are being trained in the military unit, who after training will later serve in other military units of the republic". Within the framework of the final exams, the theoretical and practical knowledge of the cadets is tested individually. Trainees who have successfully passed the unit's final exams become qualified junior commanders and specialists fill the units of the Armed Forces.

== Unit territory ==
A bronze bust of Baghramyan that was kept in the Great Patriotic War Museum in Moscow was placed on the territory of the unit in December 2019. It was erected with the main support of Russian philanthropist Artyom Vardanyan. On 11 February 2021, a chapel opening and consecration ceremony took place in the unit, attended by the Armavir Regional Governor Hambardzum Matjosyan. The chapel was built on the initiative of the command staff of the military unit and was created by architect Khachik Danielyan. Tactical exercises of combat shooting of the United Group of Forces took place at the unit.

== Notable unit members ==
- Sargis Armenakyan, Judge of the Court of the Tavush region
- Hayk Babayan, Commander of the Police Troops of the Police of Armenia

== See also ==
- Training and Education Center of the Armed Forces
- Sachkhere Mountain Training School
