= 2nd Army Corps (Armenia) =

- 2-րդ բանակային կորպուս
- Country: Armenia
- Branch: Armenian Ground Forces
- Type: Field army
- Part of: Ministry of Defence of Armenia
- HQ: Khachaghbyur

Commanders
- Commander: Major General Garegin Poghosyan

The 2nd Army Corps (Armenian: 2-րդ բանակային կորպուս) is a regional military formation of the Armenian Army, located in the city of Khachaghbyur in the Gegharkunik Province. The 2nd Army Corps has been awarded the First Degree Order of Battle Cross.

== History ==
During the Battle of Aghdam in the First Nagorno-Karabakh War, the 2nd Army Corps among other additional forces took part in the city's capture. On 29 September 2015, the corps was visited by Seyran Ohanyan, the Armenian Defence Minister.

During the 2020 Nagorno-Karabakh war, it was reported by Azeri media that the corps was forced to retreat from Kalbajar due to heavy losses in personnel and equipment, although this was denied by the staff of the corps.

Commemorating Shushi Liberation Day and Victory Day, Prime Minister Nikol Pashinyan, accompanied by Chief of the General Staff Artak Davtyan, visited the corps on 9 May 2021, presenting state awards to a number of servicemen. In his speech, he said that the "2nd Army Corps was crowned with glory and stood out for its high combat capability during the 44-day war" and "retained the high honor of all of us, our army, our people and our history."

On 19 January, fifteen servicemen of the corps were killed and seven injured after a fire broke out at a military barracks in Azat. It was the deadliest non-combat incident in the history of the armed forces, and as a result, the commander, Vahram Grigoryan, was sacked.

== Structure ==
The corps has the following structure:

- Headquarters (Khachaghbyur)
- independent tank battalion
- independent reconnaissance battalion
- independent rifle regiment
- two independent motor rifle regiments
- one independent artillery battalion

== Commanders ==
- Major General Sedrak Saroyan (1993–???)
- Major General Ovik Oganyan (– 12 June 2013)
- Major General Poghos Poghosyan (12 June 2013 – 7 July 2016)
- Colonel David Manukyan (7 July 2016)
- Major General Arayik Harutyunyan (19 December 2019 – 9 August 2021)
- Major General Vahram Grigoryan (9 August 2021 – 19 January 2023)
- Major General Garegin Poghosyan (since 19 January 2023)
