= Andranik Makaryan =

Armenian Army lieutenant general

Andranik Artavazd Makaryan (Armenian: Անդրանիկ Արտավազդի Մակարյան; born on 12 May 1966) was an Armenian Army lieutenant general. He was a Deputy Chief of the Armed Forces General Staff and has also held various senior positions in the armed forces.

== Early career ==
He was born on 12 May 1966 in the village of Chinari, in the rayon of Shamshadin of the Armenian Soviet Socialist Republic. He served in the Soviet Army from 1984 to 1986. In 1991, he graduated from the Higher School of the KGB (now the FSB Academy). After graduating, he was appointed Deputy Chief of the Hoktemberyan Border Detachment of the Transcaucasian District of the Soviet Border Troops. After the dissolution of the Soviet Union, he joined the Armenian Armed Forces in March 1992. From 1995 to 1998 he studied at the Frunze Military Academy. In 2006 he entered the Russian General Staff Academy, graduating with honors.

== Further career ==
In 2010, he was appointed by Bako Sahakyan as Deputy Commander of Artsakh Defence Army. From 20 July 2007 to June 2013, he was commander of the 5th Army Corps. From June 2013 to July 2016, he was commander of the 4th Army Corps. He was also Commander of United Group of Forces, a joint unit between the Russian 102nd Military Base and the 5th Army Corps. In September 2016, Major General Makaryan led the 25th anniversary of independence military parade on Republic Square in Yerevan, which was the biggest celebration in Armenia's history.

Since January 2018, he has been Head of the Department of Military Preparedness and Deputy Chief of Armed Forces General Staff. He was awarded to the rank of Lieutenant-General in 2020 by the decree of President Armen Sarksyan. In February 2022, he was relieved of his position and in May, due to his long service, he was discharged to the reserve.

== Criminal investigations ==
On 9 March 2021, he became involved as a criminal case defendant. As a result, a month later, he was charged with negligence during the 2020 Nagorno-Karabakh war.

== Awards ==
- Vardan Mamikonyan Order (2015)
- Medal "For Service to Homeland"
- Medal of Marshal Baghramyan
- Medal of Vazgen Sargsyan
- Medal of Garegin Nzhdeh
- Medal of Andranik Ozanyan
- Medal of Drastamat Kanayan
- Medal "For Impeccable Service"
- Medal "20 Years of Armenian Armed Forces"

== See also ==
- Grigory Khatchaturov
