= Operation Horadiz =

Battle of the Karabakh War

- Part of First Nagorno-Karabakh War
Date	December 1993 – 6 January 1994
Location	Fuzuli District, Azerbaijan
Result	Azerbaijani victory

Belligerents
(Azerbaijan Democratic Republic) Azerbaijan; Afghan Mujahideen	Armenia; Artsakh

Commanders and leaders
(Azerbaijan Democratic Republic) Shair Ramadanov (operation commander) (Azerbaijan Democratic Republic) Ilham Aghayev (commander of the intelligence unit)	(Republic of Artsakh) Mikael Harutyunyan

Units involved
Parts of 702nd Regiment; 777 Regiment; 702 Brigade; 704 Brigade; 181 Brigade; Parts of Internal Troops	2nd Goris Brigade; 97th Kapan Brigade; Hadrut Regiment; 77th Shushi Separate Battalion

Operation Horadiz (Azerbaijani: Horadiz əməliyyatı) was a battle during the First Nagorno-Karabakh War between the Azerbaijani Armed Forces and the Armenian Armed Forces in Horadiz village of Fuzuli District of the Republic of Azerbaijan, which began in December 1993 and lasted until January 6.

== History ==
=== Background ===
The Armenians, who captured Gubadly in late August 1993, declared a ceasefire because they needed to regroup and had to wait for new weapons and troops to arrive from Armenia. In late October, Armenian troops quickly captured Horadiz on the Azerbaijani-Iranian border, cutting off Zangilan's connection to Azerbaijani territory. Zangilan finally fell on 29 October 1993 into Armenian hands.

In December 1993, Armenian armed forces attempted to move east of Fuzuli, but encountered unexpected resistance and were forced to retreat. After that, the Azerbaijani army attacked in three directions. On December 15, Azerbaijani military immediately attacked in five directions — Fuzuli District, Khojavend, Agdam, Mardakert and Kalbajar. The attack on north-east of Nagorno-Karabakh forced the Armenians to leave a number of settlements in Mardakert district. The main blows of Azerbaijani troops to Horadiz came from Beylagan District. The battle had spread to the steppe. Under these conditions, Azerbaijani units destroyed the Armenian defenses and began to advance inside the Fuzuli under cannon fire and missile artillery. In early January 1994, Azerbaijanis seized 11 villages and 40 kilometers of Azerbaijani-Iranian border.

=== Battle ===
According to the Azerbaijani side, on January 5, the 702nd Brigade, which took part in the Horadiz operation, captured 3 tanks, 1 Shturm-S, 6 artillery pieces, 6 artillery trailers, about 10 vehicles, a large number of weapons and ammunition. The enemy retreated, suffering heavy casualties and leaving their dead on the battlefield. Captain Elkhan Zulfugarov of the 702nd Regiment, who died in combat at Shukyurbeyli near Horadiz, was posthumously awarded the title of National Hero of Azerbaijan.

On January 6 or January 8 the 702nd Regiment broke through Armenian resistance, fought and entered Horadiz, captured the settlement, Horadiz Railway Station and Khodaafarin Bridges, an important strategic target on the Aras. The operation was led by Shair Ramadanov. Horadiz was an important crossroads of Jabrayil, Gubadly, Zangilan districts in the west and Fuzuli in the north.

Afghan Mujahideen, who arrived in the fall of 1993, also took part in the Azerbaijani attack. According to some reports, the training of the Mujahideen was higher than that of regular Azerbaijani army, and they played a key role in the capture of Horadiz by Azerbaijani army.

== Aftermath ==
As a result of the operation, Horadiz village, 20 villages of Fuzuli district and Jojug Marjanli village of Jabrayil District came under the control of Azerbaijan. Operation Horadiz was the most successful operation conducted by the Azerbaijani Army during the 1994 winter campaign. Eight participants were awarded the title of National Hero of Azerbaijan for their heroism in the operation.

According to Azerbaijan, Azerbaijani forces took control of 21,000 hectares. On January 5, 1994, Azerbaijani Army soldiers entered Horadiz and planted the Azerbaijani flag in Horadiz.
