= Kargabazar =

Kargabazar may refer to:

- Haykashen, Armenia
- Qarğabazar, Azerbaijan
