= Khachaturov =

Khachaturov (Armenian: Խաչատուրով) is an Armenian surname. Notable people with the surname include:

- Artyom Khachaturov (born 1992), Armenian football player
- Tigran Khachaturov (1906–1989), Armenian economist
- Yuri Khachaturov (born 1952), Armenian military official
