= Training and Education Center of the Armed Forces =

The Training and Education Center of the Armed Forces (TEC) (Azerbaijani: Silahlı Qüvvələrin Təlim və Tədris Mərkəzi, TTM) is a training establishment of the Azerbaijani Armed Forces. It was established in accordance with the protocol which was signed between Azerbaijan and the Turkish Armed Forces on 5 April 2000 and decree of Azerbaijani Minister of Defense Safar Abiyev on 20 February. The TEC was opened on 26 March 2001 on the basis of advanced officers and reserve officers courses in order to facilitate the application of NATO standards in Azerbaijan Armed Forces. The TEC implements the preparation of military personnel for branches of the Armed Forces.

An event with the title of "Azerbaijani-Turkish brotherhood is eternal and indestructible" was held at the Training and Educational Center of the Armed Forces in late 2020 to honor the Azerbaijani victory in the Second Nagorno-Karabakh War.

== Courses ==
The following courses are conducted at the TEC:

- Advanced Officers Course
- Reserve Officers Training Course
- Warrant Officers Training Course
- Non Commissioned Officers (NCO) Training Course

== See also ==
- Marshal Baghramyan Training Unit
- Sachkhere Mountain Training School
- Moscow Higher Military Command School
- Armed Forces College (Turkey)
