= 14th Independent Motorized Rifle Regiment =

- 14-րդ առանձին մոտոհրաձգային գունդը
- Active: 2001–present
- Country: Armenia
- Branch: Armenian Ground Forces
- Type: Motorized infantry
- Part of: 1st Army Corps
- HQ: Kapan
- Decorations: Order of Combat Cross of the First Degree

The 14th Independent Motorized Rifle Regiment (Armenian: 14-րդ առանձին մոտոհրաձգային գունդը) is a military formation of the Armenian Army, located in the city of Kapan. It is a recipient of the Order of Combat Cross of the First Degree.

== History ==
=== 83rd and 97th Motorized Rifle Brigades ===
The predecessor unit is the 83rd Motorized Rifle Brigade and the 97th Motorized Rifle Brigade, both of which served during the First Nagorno-Karabakh War. The 97th brigade, which was founded on 12 January 1993, was tasked with the protection of the south-eastern borders of Armenia. Under the leadership of its founding commander, Lieutenant General Mikhail Grigoryan, it was responsible for the seizure of Fizuli. It also inflicted heavy losses on the Azerbaijani Army, taking the territories of historical Syunik, three regions and sixty villages.

In 2016, Sergey Minasyan, an expert at the Caucasus Institute, criticized a publication by a Russian military expert. The erroneous publication had said that the 83rd Motorized Rifle Brigade was stationed in Dashkasan, but Dashkaran is located neither in Armenia nor in the Nagorno-Karabakh Republic but rather in Azerbaijan.

=== Post-war and 21st century ===
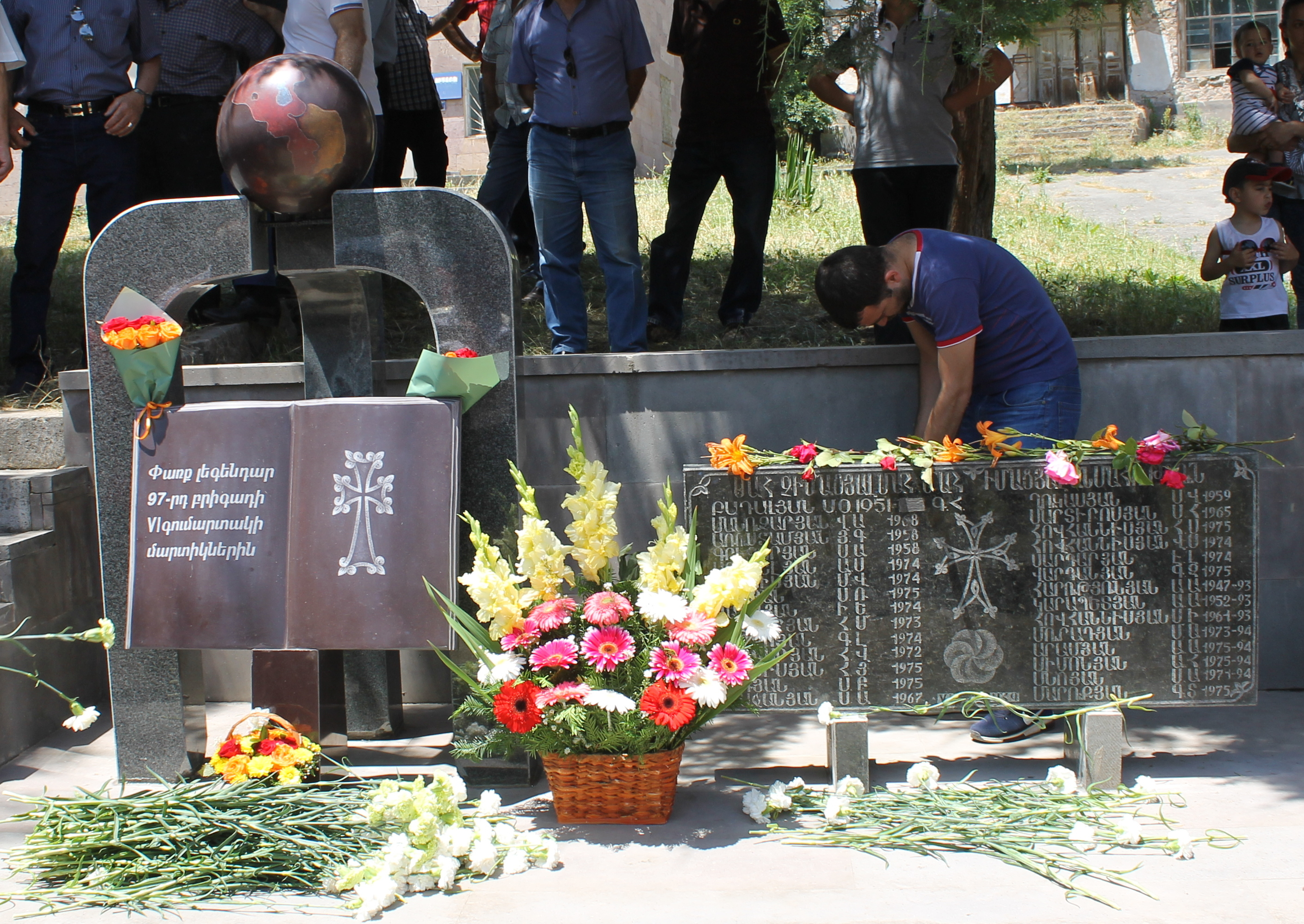
A monument dedicated to the memory of the missing servicemen of the 6th Motorized Rifle Battalion of the 97th Kapan Brigade.

During the reign of its commander Manvel Grigoryan (who was appointed to this position in 1993), structural changes were made, as a result of which the 97th and 83rd brigades were united, becoming the 14th Independent Motorized Rifle Brigade. In 2001, the 14th Brigade was reorganized into the 14th Independent Motorized Rifle Regiment, which, after handing over the combat duty to the Artsakh Defence Army, was moved to a permanent location. The following commanders served as heads of the unit:

- Colonel Arthur Aghabekyan
- Colonel Arthur Grigoryan
- Colonel Davit Aghajanyan
- Colonel Arayik Vardanyan
- Colonel Gagik Avsharyan
- Colonel Samvel Hakobyan
- Lieutenant Colonel Samvel Poghosyan
- Colonel Karen Serobyan

On Army Day 2007, on the occasion of the 15th anniversary of the military, the regiment was awarded the Order of Combat Cross of the First Degree.
