= Grigory Khatchaturov =

Armenian major general

Գրիգորի Յուրիի Խաչատուրով
- Գրիգորի Խաչատուրով (Armenian)
- Born: 30 July 1977 (age 49); Primorsky Krai, Russian SFSR, Soviet Union
- Education: Yerevan General Military School; Combined Arms Academy of the Armed Forces of the Russian Federation; Russian General Staff Academy
- Military career
- Allegiance: Armenia
- Branch: Armed Forces of Armenia
- Service years: 1994–2021
- Rank: Major-General

Grigory Yurii Khachaturov (Armenian: Գրիգորի Յուրիի Խաչատուրով; born 30 July 1977) is a major general in the Armenian Ground Forces who is also the son of former Collective Security Treaty Organization Secretary-General and former Chief of the General Staff of the Armed Forces of Armenia, Colonel General Yuri Khatchaturov.

== Early life ==
He was born in the Primorsky Krai (in what is now Russia), and grew up in the Byelorussian Soviet Socialist Republic with his mother and father. He is named after his grandfather. After the dissolution of the Soviet Union, his father was sent to Armenia by the order of the Ministry of Defense of Belarus. Grigory then entered the Yerevan General Military School. According to him, he began to learn the Armenian language, as he grew up being fluent in the Russian language. Khachaturov served on the borders of Armenia while in the army. After college, he graduated from the Combined Arms Academy of the Armed Forces of the Russian Federation and the Russian General Staff Academy.

== Further career ==
Khachaturov at one point in his career was appointed commander of the Motorized Rifle Regiment named after Vazgen Sargsyan of the 4th Army Corps. In 2010, he resigned from the post of commander of the unit. immediately after this, cases of abuse of office by officers were revealed in this unit, with a criminal case being initiated, which was later closed on the basis of "effective repentance." He was appointed to the post of commander of the 3rd Army Corps in Vanadzor on 7 July 2016, succeeding Onik Gasparyan. He was previously the deputy commander of the corps, He was awarded his current rank on 20 September 2019. During the July 2020 Armenian–Azerbaijani clashes, he successfully prevented Azeri advances in Tavush Province. During a ceremony at Sardarapat, Khachaturov, received the Battle Cross of the first degree for his role in the battles.

== Retirement ==
In 2021, General Khatchaturov was one of 40 officers who signed the Armenian military memorandum against Prime Minister Nikol Pashinyan. He was arrested in March 2023 on charges of money laundering strongly denied by him. He was released on bail on December 1, 2023.
