= 5th Army Corps (Armenia) =

- 5-րդ բանակային կորպուս
- Active: 1998–present
- Country: Armenia
- Branch: Armenian Ground Forces
- Type: Field army
- Part of: Ministry of Defence of Armenia
- HQ: Nubarashen in Yerevan

Commanders
- Commander: Major General Smbat Grigoryan

The 5th Army Corps (Armenian: 5-րդ բանակային կորպուս) is a corps, a military formation, of the Armenian Army. The 5th Army Corps was formed in 1998. The corps commander is Smbat Grigoryan.

== Structure ==
The corps consists of the following:

- 9th Fortified Region
- Fortified Region
- 4th Independent Motor Rifle Regiment "Tamanyan" (Yerevan)
- 545th Motor Rifle Regiment "Andranik Ozanyan" (Nurabashen)
- 61st Separate Engineering Regiment (Echmiadzin)

It also has reconnaissance, tank, and artillery battalions as well as self-propelled artillery and rear service battalions.

== Activities ==
Units from the corps are stationed close to the Armenian-Turkish border. Together with the Russian 102nd Military Base, the corps makes up the United Group of Forces, set up in 2000 by President Robert Kocharyan and President Vladimir Putin. Units of the corps took part in the 2020 Armenian–Azerbaijani skirmishes. The corps was thought to be a key player during the 2021 Armenian coup d'état attempt.

== Commanders ==
- Major General Seyran Ohanyan (1998-1999)
- Major General Haykaz Baghmanyan (1999-?)
- Major General Valeri Grigoryan (?-20 July 2007)
- Major General Andranik Makaryan (20 July 2007-June 2013)
- Major General Kamo Kochunts (June 2013-13 November 2015)
- Major General Karen Abrahamyan (13 November 2015 – 28 September 2017)
- Major General Artak Davtyan (28 September 2017 – 24 May 2018)
- Major General Andranik Piloyan (18 June 2018 – 30 December 2020)
- Major General Smbat Grigoryan (30 December 2020 – present)

== Decorated servicemen ==
National Hero of Armenia Jivan Abrahamyan was part of the corps. 15 knights of the "Combat Cross" 1st and 2nd degree orders and 195 fighters of the corps were awarded medals of the Republic of Armenia and the Nagorno Karabakh Republic. Two are recipients of the "Combat Cross" Order of the 1st degree, 19 are recipients of the "Combat Cross" Order of the 2nd degree and 102 fighters were awarded the Medal of Courage and 14 the Medal of Combat Service.

== Honors ==
The 4th Independent Motor Rifle Regiment retains the battle flag and the traditions of the 89th Tamanyan Division of the Red Army. The battle flag of the regiment holds the Order of the Battle Cross of the 1st degree.
