= Yuri Khatchaturov =

Armenian colonel general

Yuri Khachaturov
- Յուրի Խաչատուրով (Armenian); Юрий Хачатуров (Russian)
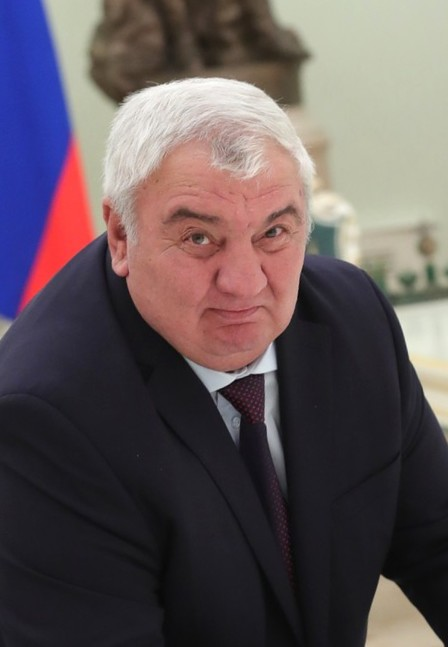
- Khatchaturov in 2017

5th Secretary General of the CSTO
- In office 2 May 2017 – 2 November 2018
- Preceded by: Nikolay Bordyuzha
- Succeeded by: Stanislav Zas

Secretary of the Security Council of Armenia
- In office 3 October 2016 – 2 May 2017
- President: Serzh Sargsyan
- Preceded by: Armen Gevorgyan
- Succeeded by: Armen Grigoryan

Chief of the General Staff of the Armenian Armed Forces
- In office 15 April 2008 – 3 October 2016
- President: Serzh Sargsyan
- Preceded by: Seyran Ohanyan
- Succeeded by: Movses Hakobyan

Personal details
- Born: 1 May 1952 (age 74) Tetritskaro, Georgian SSR, Soviet Union
- Awards: See list

Military service
- Allegiance: Soviet Union; Armenia
- Branch/service: Soviet Army; Armenian Ground Forces
- Years of service: 1972–present
- Rank: Colonel-General
- Battles/wars: Soviet–Afghan War; First Nagorno-Karabakh War

Yuri Grigorii Khachaturov (Armenian: Յուրի Գրիգորիի Խաչատուրով; Russian: Юрий Григорьевич Хачатуров; born 1 May 1952) is an Armenian general. He formerly served as the Secretary-General of the Collective Security Treaty Organization (CSTO) and as Chief of the General Staff of the Armed Forces of Armenia (2008–2016).

== Early life ==
Yuri Khachaturov was born in Tetritskaro, Georgian SSR on 1 May 1952. After graduating from Tetritskaro Secondary School in 1969, he entered the Tbilisi Artillery Command School, from which he graduated with honors in 1974.

== Military service ==
=== Soviet Army ===
After graduation, Khachaturov was appointed commander of a platoon in the artillery regiment of the motor rifle division of the Far Eastern Military District of the Soviet Army. From 1976 to 1982, he held various posts in the Far Eastern Military District, including battery commander, chief of staff and deputy commander of an artillery division, and commander of an anti-tank artillery division. From 1982 to 1985, he studied at the Kalinin Artillery Military Academy in Leningrad. Afterward, he was appointed Chief of Staff of the Missile Forces and Artillery Tank Division of the Belarusian Military District. Khachaturov served as chief of staff of the missile forces and artillery of the 5th Guards Motor Rifle Division of the 40th Army in Afghanistan from 1987 to February 1989. For his service in the Soviet–Afghan War, he was honored with the Order "For Service to the Homeland in the Armed Forces of the USSR", two Soviet Orders of the Red Star, and the Order of the Star (2nd degree) from the Democratic Republic of Afghanistan.

=== Armenian Army ===
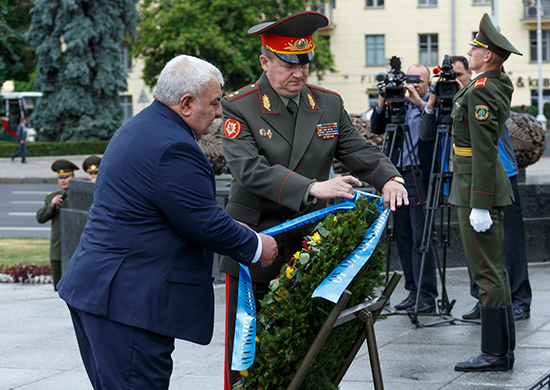
Khatchaturov laying a wreath with Belarusian Defense Minister Andrei Ravkov.

After serving in Afghanistan, Khachaturov was appointed commander of the separate artillery brigade of a tank army of the Belarusian Military District in October 1989. After the fall of the Soviet Union, he was transferred to the Ministry of Defense of Armenia by special decree of the Defense Ministry of Belarus and appointed commander of the Armenian 2nd Infantry Regiment in April 1992. He took part in the hostilities of the First Nagorno-Karabakh War and was actively involved in the protection of the state border. In particular, he commanded units involved in the capture of Kalbajar District in 1993 and the operation to capture parts of Zangilan District in the vicinity of Kapan in 1992.

In September 1992, Khachaturov became Chief of the Armenian Border Guard. He played an important role in the formation of the Goris Infantry Regiment (1993–1994), the Tavush Motorized Brigade (1994–1995), and the first and fourth army corps (1996–1997 and 1997–2000 respectively) of the Armenian Army. Khachaturov also held the post of commander of rapid deployment units and the Deputy Chief of the General Staff of the Armed Forces of the Republic of Armenia.

In 1995, Khachaturov was awarded the rank of major general. He was promoted to lieutenant general in 2000 and colonel general on 15 April 2008. On 21 March 2000, he was appointed deputy minister of defense of Armenia. Khachaturov was appointed the Chief of the General Staff of the Armed Forces of Armenia in April 2008, just after Serzh Sargsyan was made President of Armenia. He was dismissed from the position in October 2016, becoming Secretary of the Security Council of Armenia.

Khachaturov became Secretary-General of the Collective Security Treaty Organization (CSTO), the military alliance of which Armenia is a founding member, in May 2017. He held this position until November 2018.

== Arrest and trial ==
On July 26, 2018, Khachaturov was arrested and charged with "overthrowing the constitutional order" in connection with his actions as commander of the Yerevan garrison during the events of March 1–2, 2008, when opposition protests led by Levon Ter-Petrosyan were suppressed by police and military forces, resulting in several deaths (Ter-Petrosyan had accused the authorities of rigging the results of the presidential elections held in February of that year). Armenia appealed to the CSTO to relieve Khachaturov from the post of secretary-general. Khachaturov was released from custody on bail of $10,000. Khachaturov was tried alongside ex-president Robert Kocharyan, ex-defense minister Seyran Ohanyan (who was Chief of the General Staff in March 2008), and former secretary of the Security Council Armen Gevorgyan. The trial ended in March 2021 after the Constitutional Court of Armenia declared unconstitutional the article of the criminal code under which Khachaturov was being tried.

== Personal life ==
Khachaturov is married and has three sons. One of his sons, Grigory, was a major general in the Armenian Army, serving as the commander of the 3rd Army Corps in Vanadzor. Another son, Igor, was detained in 2022 on charges of assaulting a police officer during the 2022 Armenian protests. Growing up in a multiethnic town in neighboring Georgia, he had a poor command of the Armenian language and as a result was much more fluent in the Russian language, his first language.

== Awards ==
Armenia and Artsakh

- (Armenia) Order of the Combat Cross
- (Armenia) Order of Vardan Mamikonian
- (Armenia) Mesrop Mashtots Medal
- (Armenia) Order of Nerses the Gracious
- (Armenia) Medal of Marshal Baghramyan
- (Armenia) Andranik Ozanian Medal
- (Armenia) Medal "For Military Cooperation"
- (Armenia) Medal " For Strengthening Community"
- (Republic of Artsakh) Hero of Artsakh
- (Republic of Artsakh) Order of the Combat Cross

Soviet Union

- (Soviet Union) Order of the Red Star, twice
- (Soviet Union) Order for Service to the Homeland in the Armed Forces of the USSR, 3rd class
- (Soviet Union) Medal "Veteran of the Armed Forces of the USSR"
- (Soviet Union) Jubilee Medal "60 Years of the Armed Forces of the USSR"
- (Soviet Union) Jubilee Medal "70 Years of the Armed Forces of the USSR"
- (Soviet Union) Medal "For Impeccable Service", 1st class
- (Soviet Union) Medal "For Impeccable Service", 2nd class

Foreign

- (Russia) Medal of Zhukov
