= 3rd Army Corps (Armenia) =

- 3-ին բանակային կորպուս
- Country: Armenia
- Branch: Armenian Ground Forces
- Type: Field army
- Part of: Ministry of Defence of Armenia
- HQ: Vanadzor
- Engagements: July 2020 Armenian–Azerbaijani clashes

Commanders
- Commander: Colonel Alexander Tsakanyan

The 3rd Army Corps (Armenian: 3-ին բանակային կորպուս) is a regional military formation of the Armenian Army, located in the city of Vanadzor in the Lori Province. Its commander is Grigory Khatchaturov, a major general in the army who is also the son of former Collective Security Treaty Organization Secretary-General Yuri Khatchaturov.

== History ==
After the 2008 Armenian presidential election, due to internal political tensions, the personnel of the army corps were brought to the barracks. By the order of the commander of the 3rd Army Corps Levon Yeranosyan, the combat vehicles attached to Unit 63853 were moved to Yerevan. In 2014, the 3rd Army Corps was recognized as the best in the republic. On 21 July 2016, a delegation of the United States Senate Committee on Armed Services visited the 3rd Army Corps, accompanied by the U.S. Ambassador Richard Mills, where they were briefed by General Khachaturov on the ceasefire violations by the Azeri military. In 2021, General Khatchaturov was one of 40 officers who signed the Armenian military memorandum against Prime Minister Nikol Pashinyan.

After the July conflict of 2020, Artsrun Hovhannisyan, head of the Information Crisis Center in Ijevan, announced on Facebook the creation of a new anthem dedicated to the corps. The song is entitled "Victorious 3rd Army Corps, Northern Guardian of the Armenian Land". In August of the following year, a memorial wall was opened in the corps in honor of the veterans of the battles. During the 2020 Nagorno-Karabakh war, Colonel Tatul Ghazaryan of the 246th Motor Rifle Regiment, was killed in Artsakh on 19 October, later being awarded posthumously.

== Structure ==
The corps has the following structure:

- Headquarters (Vanadzor)
- 246th Motor Rifle Regiment (Ijevan)
- 543rd Motor Rifle Regiment (Noyemberyan)
- 549th Motor Rifle Regiment (Chambarak)
- one independent artillery battalion
- one independent tank battalion
- one independent reconnaissance battalion
- one independent rocket artillery battalion
- one maintenance battalion
- one signals battalion

As of today, 11 military units have been under the subordination of the 3rd Army Corps.

=== Military Unit No. 63853 ===
There is Military Unit No. 63853 named after General Drastamat Kanayan. On 28 January 1992, the military unit was created on the basis of the construction department No. 606 located in Vanadzor, which was handed over to the subordination of the Ministry of Defense. Colonel Alexander Tazagulyan was appointed the first commander. On February 2, the regiment was renamed to its current name. 2 February is the anniversary day of the unit.

== Commanders ==
The following have served as commanders of the corps:

- Levon Yeranosyan (2003-11 April 2012)
- Onik Gasparyan (11 April 2012 – 7 July 2016)
- Grigory Khatchaturov (since 7 July 2016 – 7 July 2021)
- Alexander Tsakanyan (since 5 August 2021)
