= Arshaluys =

Village in Armavir, Armenia

Arshaluys Արշալույս
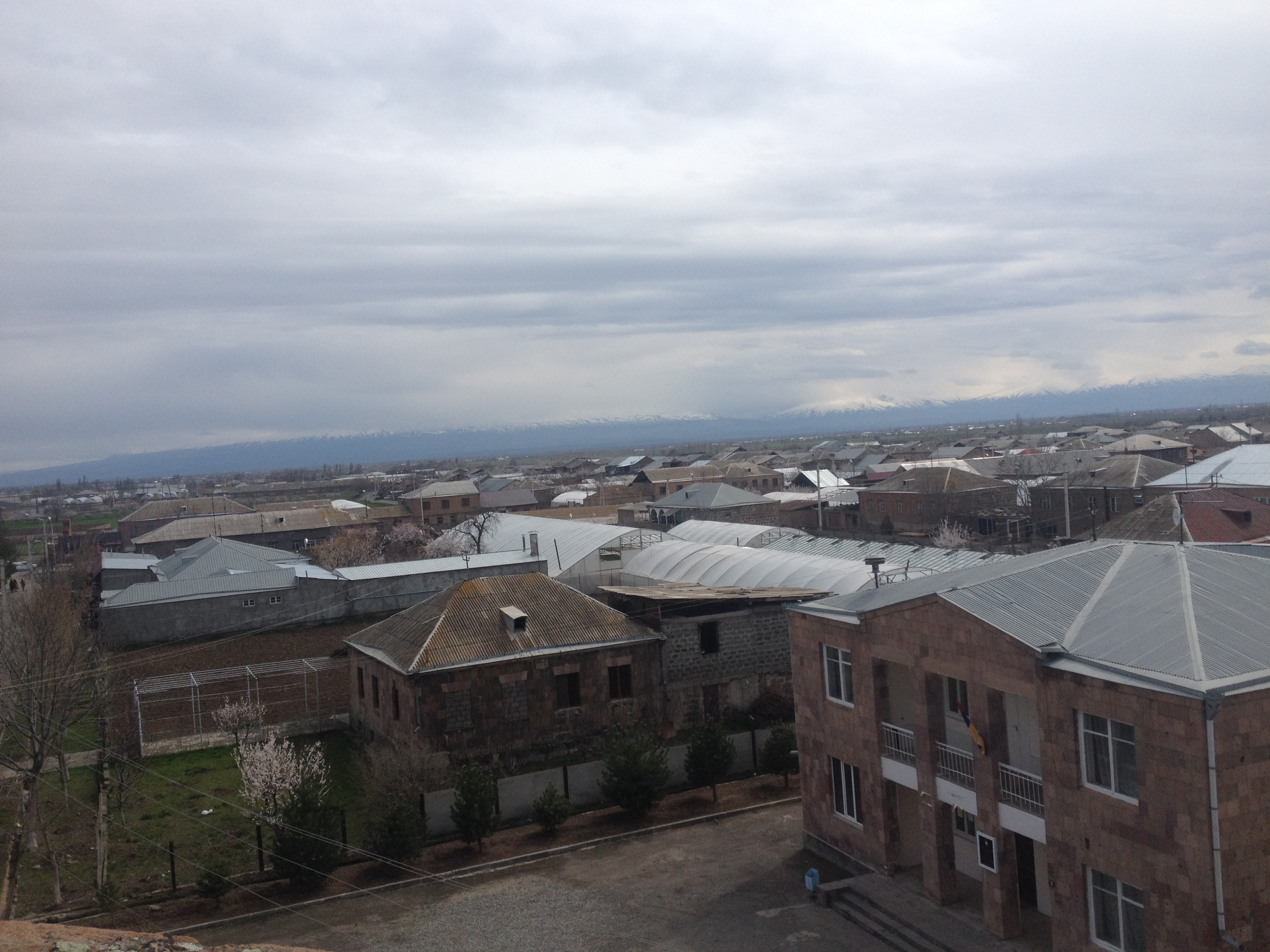

- Location within Armenia
- Coordinates: 40°10′08″N 44°12′51″E
- Country: Armenia
- Province: Armavir

Area
  - Total: 17.56 km^{2} (6.78 sq mi)

Population (2011)
  - Total: 4,250
  - Density: 242/km^{2} (627/sq mi)
- Time zone: UTC+4 ( )
  - Summer (DST): UTC+5 ( )
- Area code: +374 (23)

Arshaluys (Armenian: Արշալույս, until 1935 Kyorpalu) is a village in the Armavir Province of Armenia. It is located 14 km north-east from the regional center. It is located on the right bank of the Kasagh River. The city is about 19 km from Yerevan. The settlement is 860 meters above sea level. It has a direct road to Vagharshapat and Yerevan.

== History ==
The ancestors of the inhabitants migrated from Ani in 1828–1829, and some came from Yerevan. The Armavir region and the Ararat region were part of the Ayrarat province in the ancient Kingdom of Armenia.

The village has a Surb Astvatsatsin church, built in the 1870s. The village is about 2 km south of the village of St. Karapet.

== Culture ==
There is a secondary school in Arshalugh, has a renovated and modern kindergarten, a hospital, a sports school, a music school, a football stadium and more. In 2018, a sculpture and painting school was opened, and the students have placed their own sculptures on display in the village.

== Economy ==
The population is engaged in horticulture and vegetable growing. In the area, viniculture is developed, which is conditioned by the geographical location as well as Artizanian water, which also contributes to the growing of vegetables. The most common vegetable are potatoes, which are exported to Georgia.

There is currently only one factory in Arshaluys - the "Arpenik" wine factory.

== Geography and Climate ==
The area is almost completely flat. The climate is dry. Winter starts in mid-December, average winter temperatures reach from −2 °C to −6 °C. Summer lasts from May to October, the average air temperature reaches 24 °C to 26 °C and a maximum of 42 °C, almost the same as in Vagharshapat.

== Gallery ==
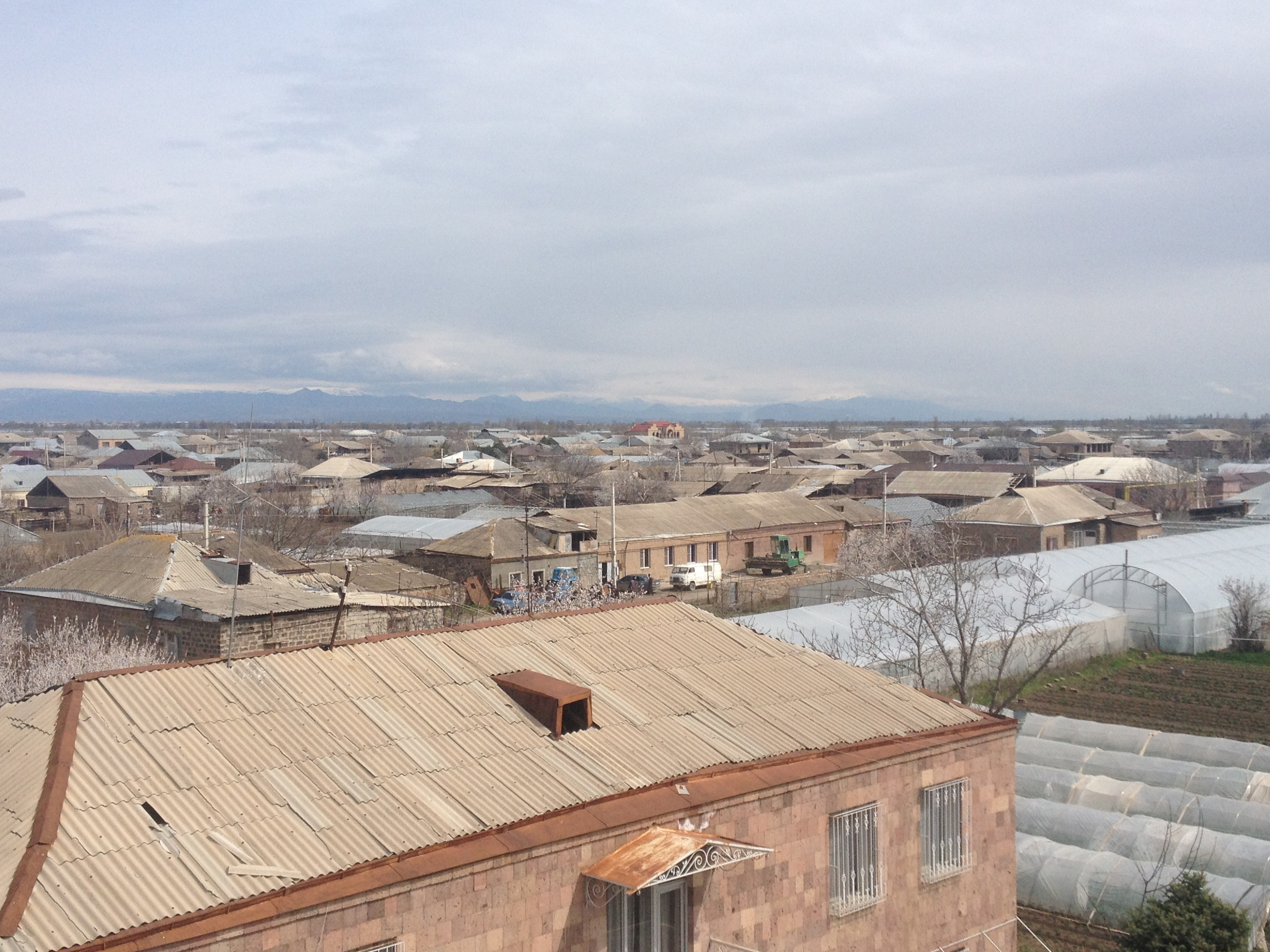

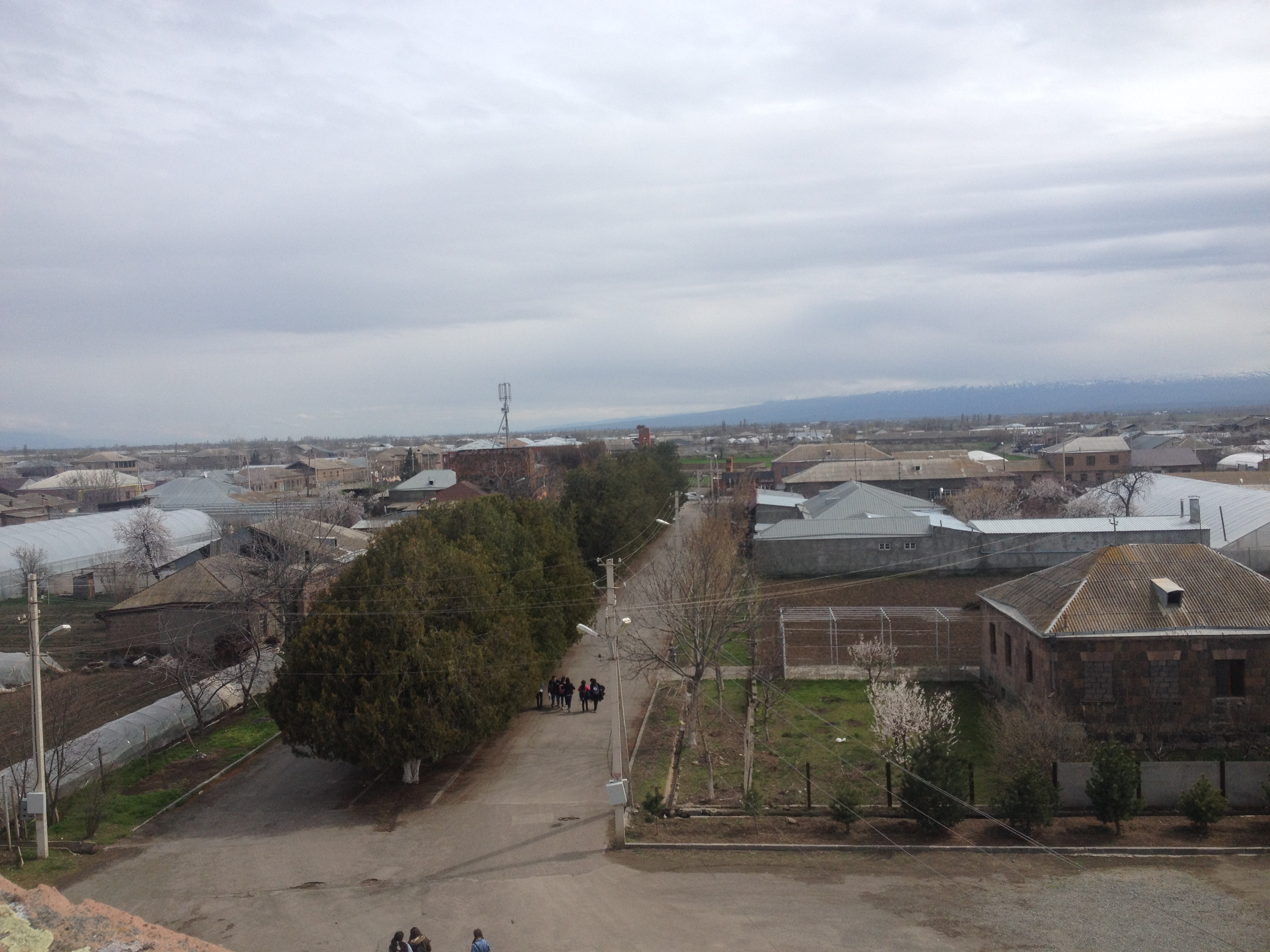

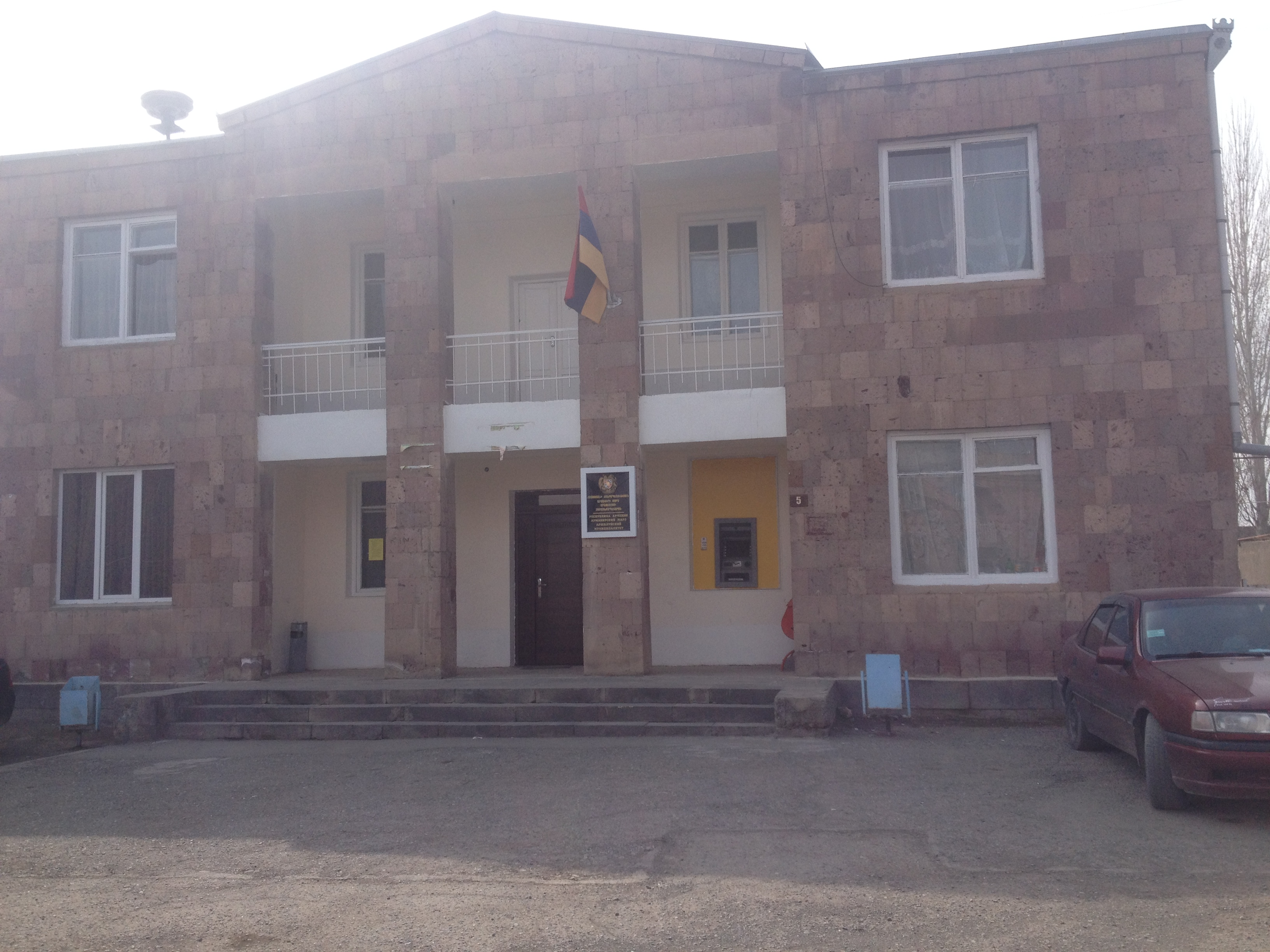

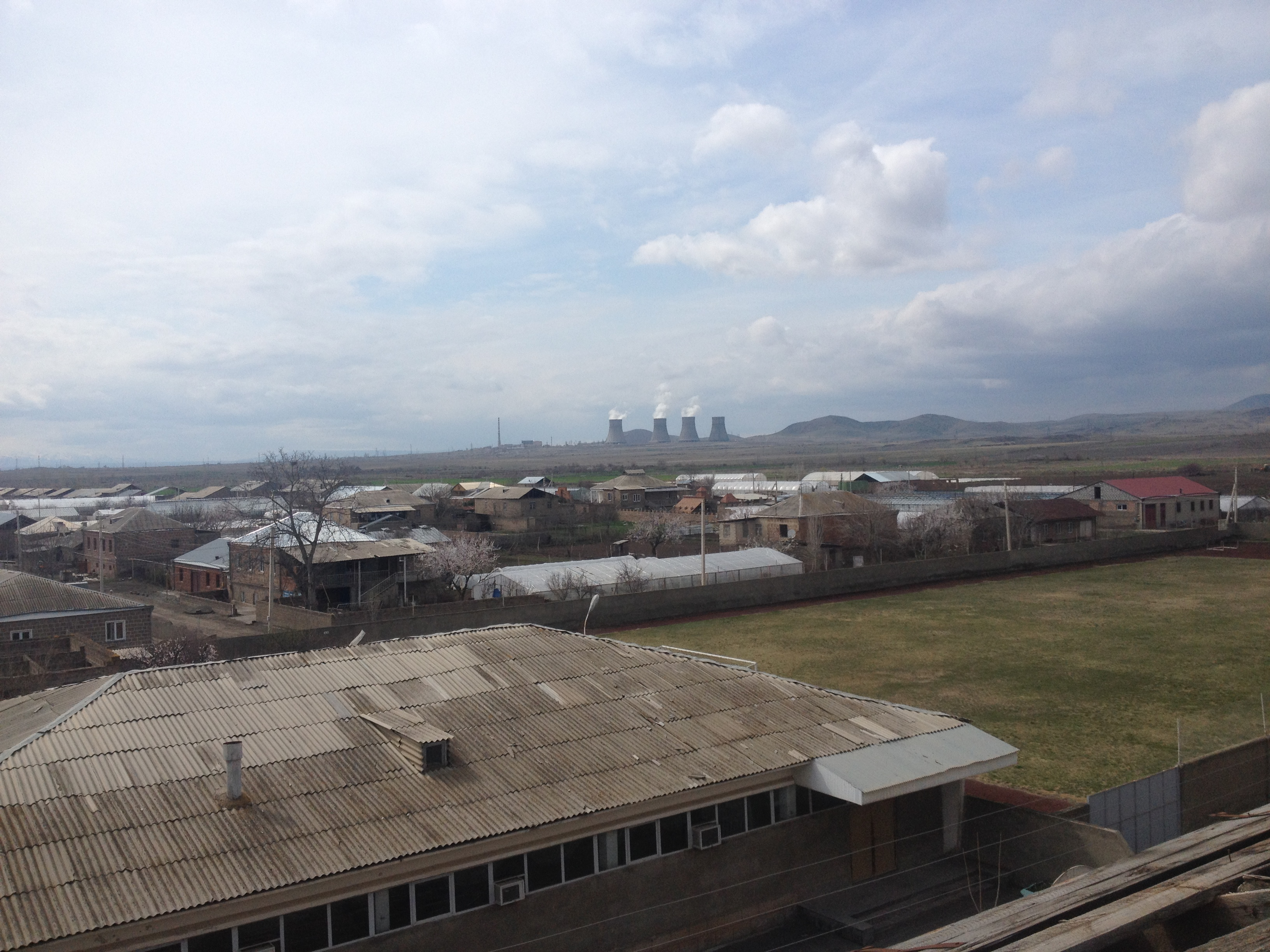

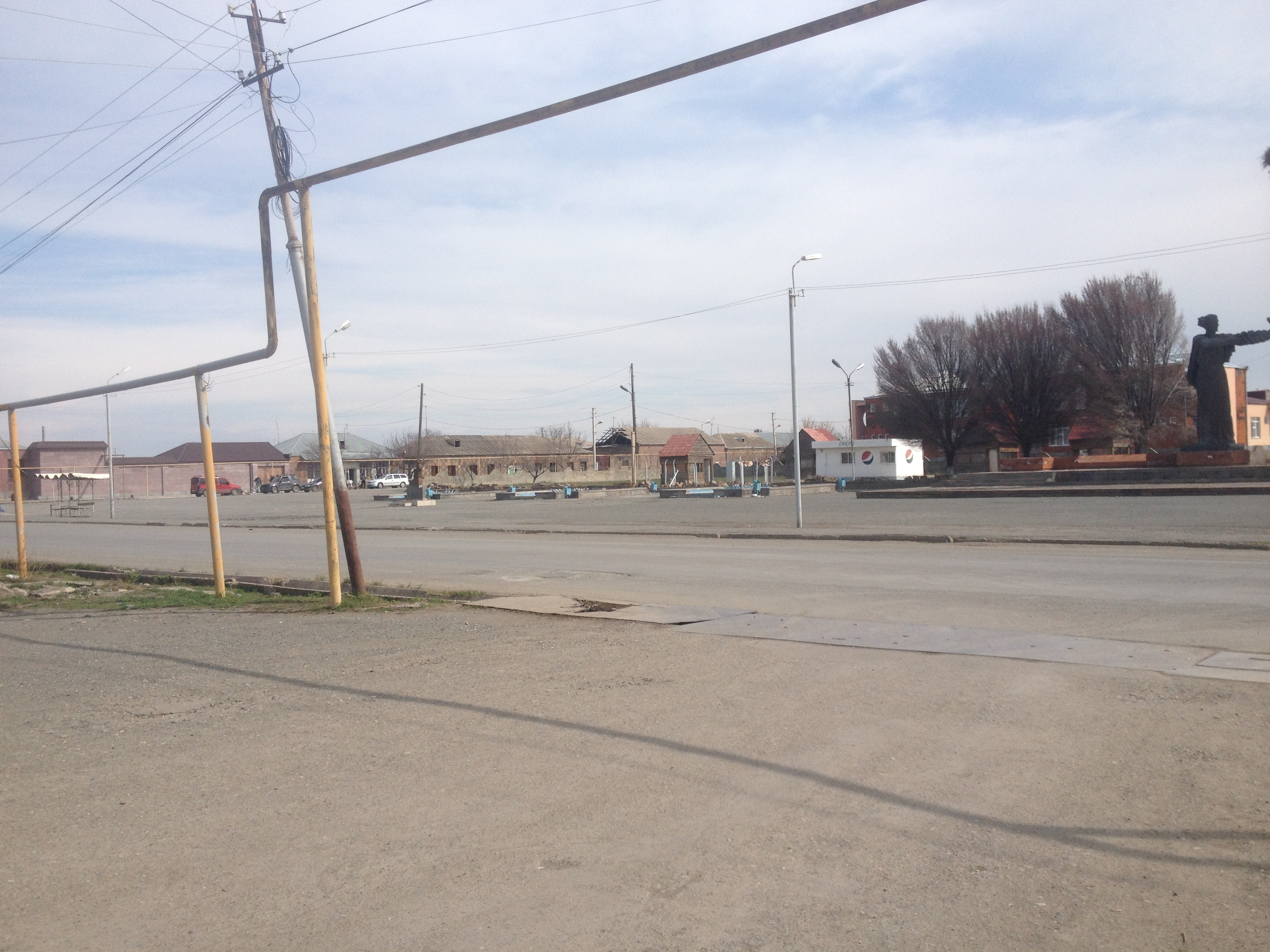

== See also ==
- Armavir Province
