= Chobankara =

- Location within Armenia
- Coordinates: 40°06′57″N 44°19′10″E
- Country: Armenia
- Marz (Province): Armavir
- Time zone: UTC+4 ( )

Chobankara, is a former village in the Armavir Province of Armenia.
