= Haykashen, Armenia =

Village in Armavir, Armenia

Haykashen Հայկաշեն
- Location within Armenia
- Coordinates: 40°04′22″N 44°18′25″E
- Country: Armenia
- Marz (Province): Armavir

Population (2011)
  - Total: 1,115
- Time zone: UTC+4

Haykashen (Armenian: Հայկաշեն), is a village in the Armavir Province of Armenia.

== Notable people ==
- Simon Martirosyan (born 1997), two-time Olympic silver medalist and two-time world champion in weightlifting.
- Sedrak Saroyan (1967–2022), general and MP

== See also ==
- Armavir Province
