= Lusakert, Shirak =

Village in Shirak, Armenia

Lusakert Լուսակերտ
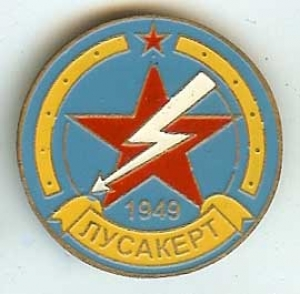
- Coat of arms

- Location within Armenia Location within Shirak
- Coordinates: 40°40′N 43°52′E
- Country: Armenia
- Province: Shirak
- Municipality: Artik

Population (2011)
  - Total: 754
- Time zone: UTC+4
  - Summer (DST): UTC+5

Lusakert (Armenian: Լուսակերտ) is a village in Artik Municipality of the Shirak Province in Armenia.

== Demographics ==
Historical population
Year	Pop.	±% p.a.
1831	126	—
1897	416	+1.83%
1926	425	+0.07%
1939	644	+3.25%
1959	608	−0.29%
1979	712	+0.79%
2001	713	+0.01%
2011	754	+0.56%
