= Arevshat =

Village in Ararat, Armenia

Arevshat Արևշատ
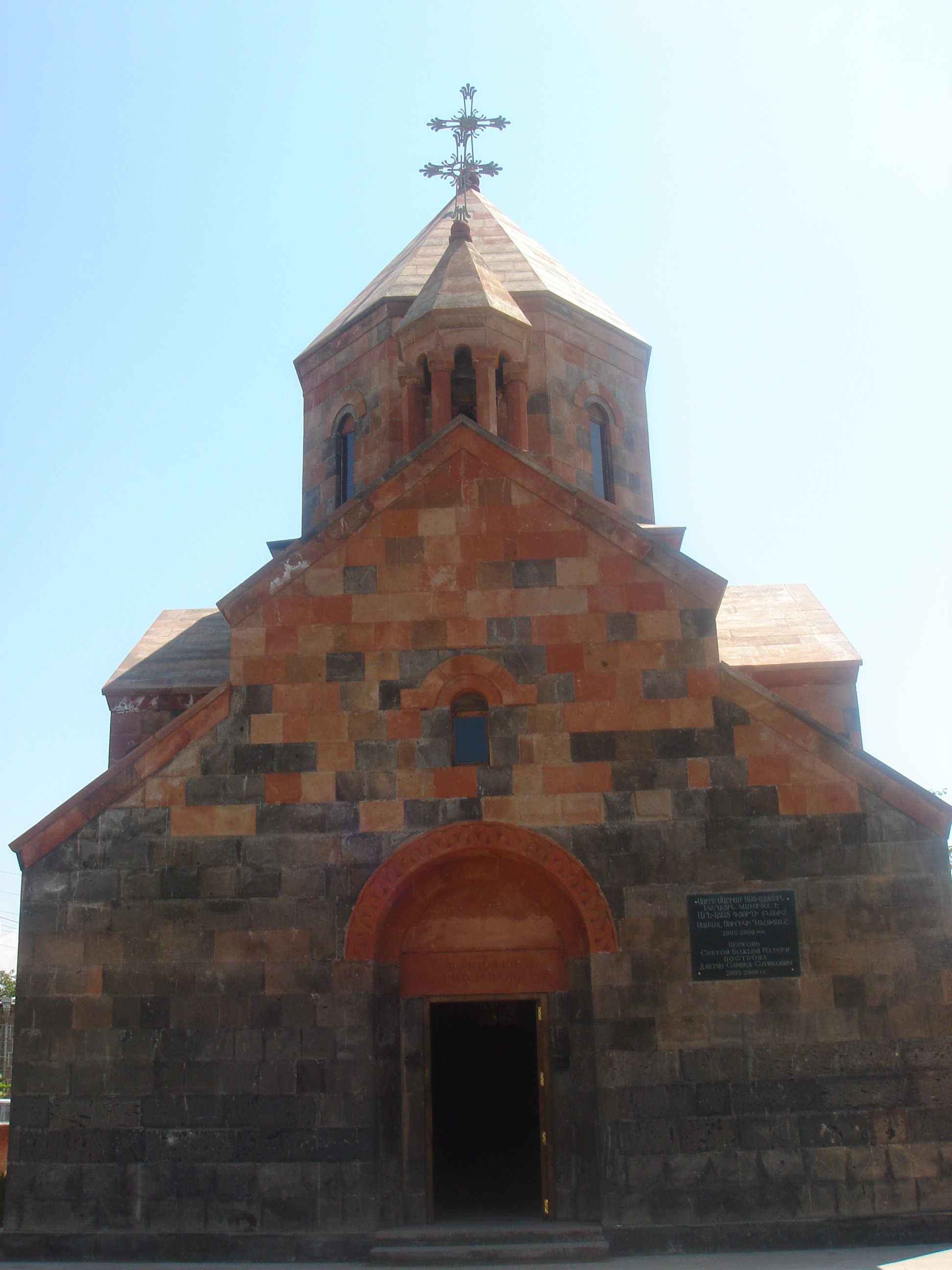
- Arevshat Church

- Location within Armenia Location within Ararat
- Coordinates: 40°02′21″N 44°32′30″E
- Country: Armenia
- Province: Ararat
- Municipality: Artashat

Population (2011)
  - Total: 2,444
- Time zone: UTC+4
  - Summer (DST): UTC+5

Arevshat (Armenian: Արևշատ) is a village in the Artashat Municipality of the Ararat Province of Armenia.
