= Sachkhere Mountain Training School =

Military training school near Sachkhere, Georgia

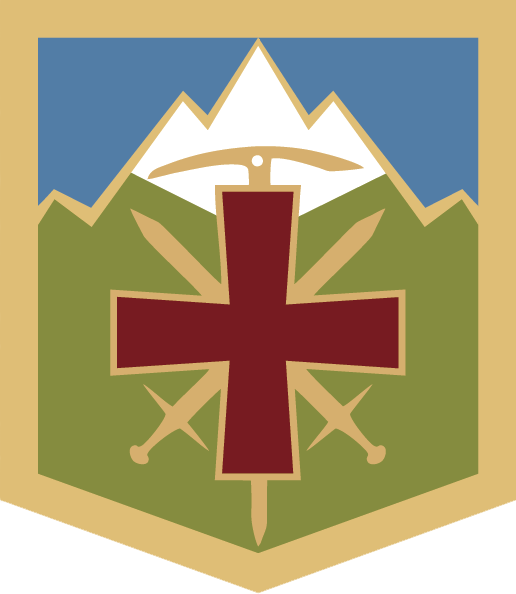
Sachkhere Mountain Training School logo

The Sachkhere Mountain Training School (Georgian: საჩხერის სამთო მომზადების სკოლა) is a mountain warfare training facility in Georgia, located near the town of Sachkhere in the west of the country. Established on 14 August 2006, it is operated by the Joint Staff of the Georgian Armed Forces Military Training and Education Command.

The Sachkhere Mountain Training School was created on the basis of the 16th Mountain Battalion, whose predecessor, the Sachkhere Battalion, was one of the first National Guard units established in Georgia during its struggle for independence from the Soviet Union in 1991. The founder and commander of the battalion, Besarion Kutateladze, played a role in the Georgian civil strife and was killed in a clash with the Russian troops at Gori in June 1992.

The school was established through the help of the United States and France. France also provided instructors for training Georgian officers at the school. In 2010, within the framework of NATO–Georgia cooperation, the school was qualified as a Partnership for Peace Training and Education Center.
