= United Group of Forces =

The United Group of Forces (Armenian: Ուժերի միավորված խումբ; Russian: Объединенная группа сил) is a joint unit with the Armed Forces of Armenia and the Russian Armed Forces. It is composed of management bodies and units and formations of both militaries: the Russian 102nd Military Base and the Armenian Army's 5th Army Corps. It is currently deployed at the Russian Military Base in Gyumri.

== Purpose ==
It is designed to provide military security in the Caucasus region, particularly the Nagorno-Karabakh region. Specifically, it identifies the preparation of military actions either country and responds jointly. An example of where this joint action would be needed was laid out by Armenian General Andranik Makaryan: "if the village of Voskevaz is shelled, the combined troops will be involved, or the war must be officially declared". They have held exercises on an annual basis. In peacetime, the group of forces is commanded by the General Staff of the Armenian Armed Forces. During any period of hostilities, all the leadership of the group is transferred to the Russian Southern Military District based in Rostov-on-Don.

== History ==
It was initially set up in 2000 by President Robert Kocharyan and President Vladimir Putin. In November 2016, on the sidelines of the CIS Defense Ministers Council session in Moscow, Defense Ministers Sergey Shoigu and Vigen Sargsyan signed an agreement on reinforcing the tasks of the unit. At the time of the signing, Azerbaijani lawmakers in National Assembly condemned the agreement, claiming that it is proof of Russian support for Armenia in the Nagorno-Karabakh conflict. In July 2017, the Federation Council of Russia ratified the agreement on the united group of troops. The term of the agreement is five years. In early 2018, Major General Tigran Parvanyan was appointed commander of the group. Nikol Pashinyan has called for the strengthening the group, referring to it as "an essential element in ensuring regional security".

== Commanders ==
- Major General Andranik Makaryan (July 2016 - February 2018)
- Lieutenant General Tigran Parvanyan (February 2018 - 14 March 2023)
- Major General Artak Budaghyan (since 14 February 2024)
