= Argel, Armenia =

Argel Արգել
- Village
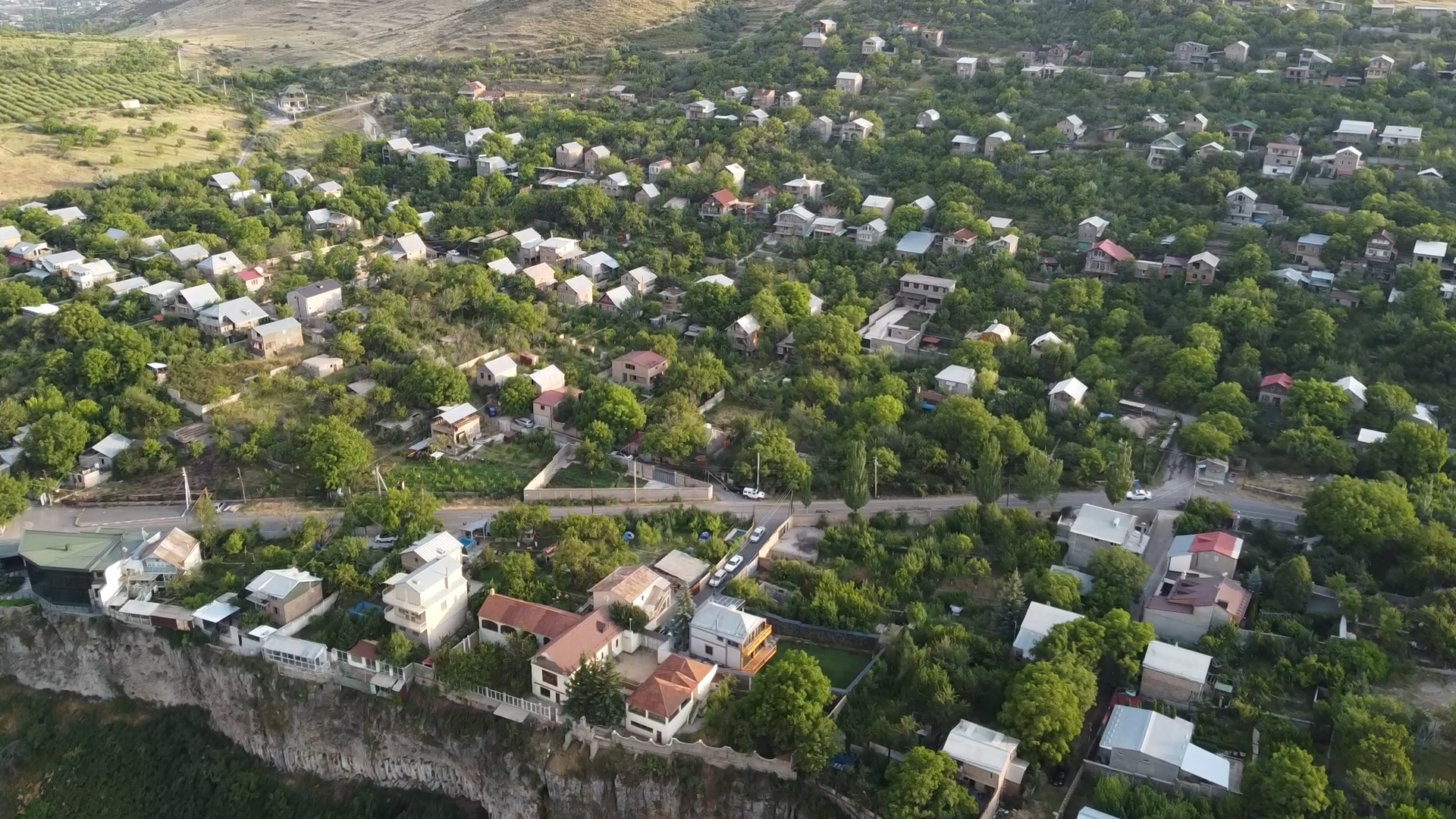
- Argel Village

- Location within Armenia
- Coordinates: 40°22′46″N 44°35′58″E
- Country: Armenia
- Marz (Province): Kotayk
- Elevation: 1,428 m (4,685 ft)

Population (2011)
  - Total: 2,501
- Time zone: UTC+4 ( )

Argel (Armenian: Արգել), formerly Lusakert (Armenian: Լուսակերտ), is a village in the Kotayk Province of Armenia.

== Gallery ==
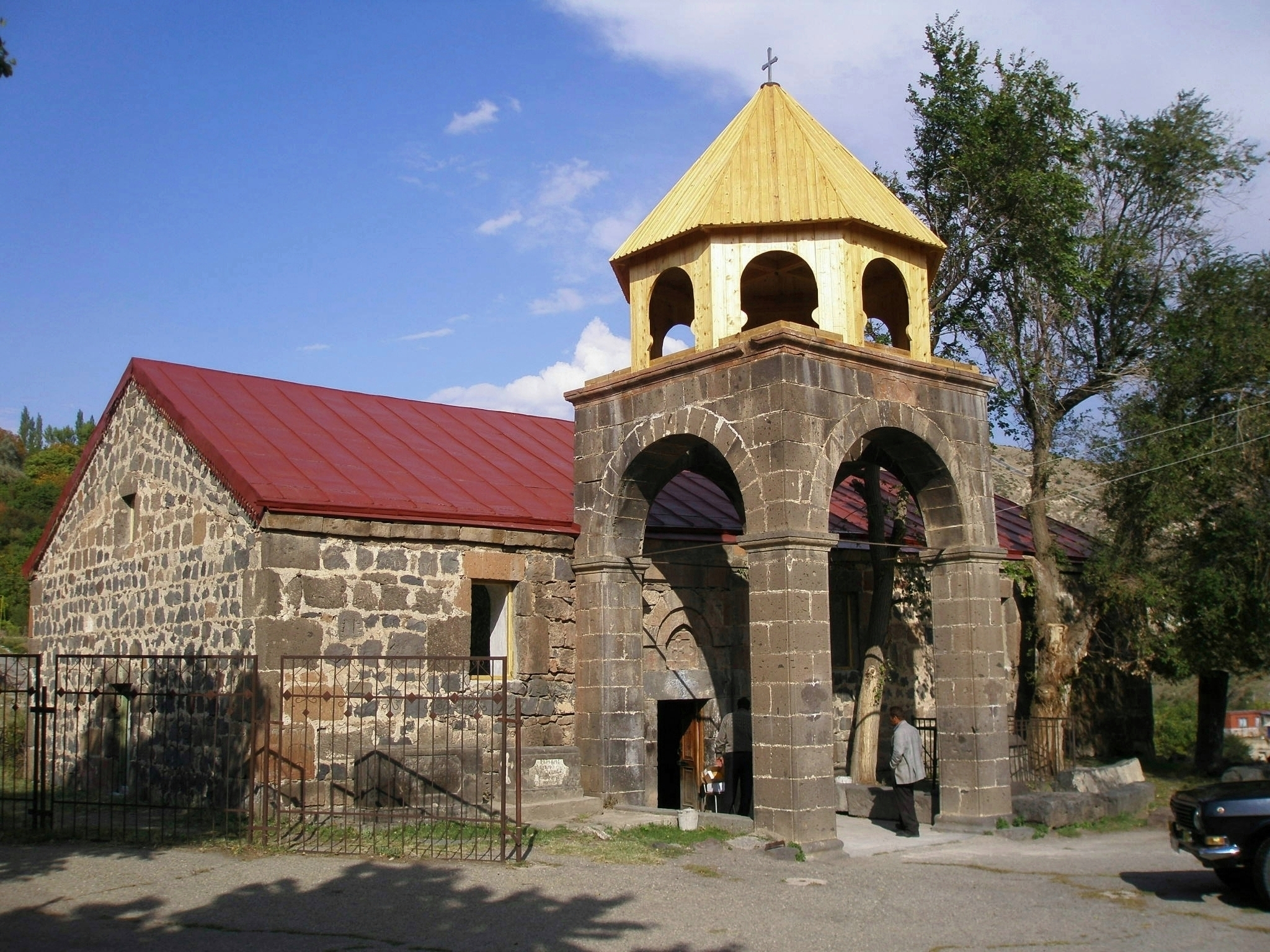
S. Gevorg Church built in 1890.

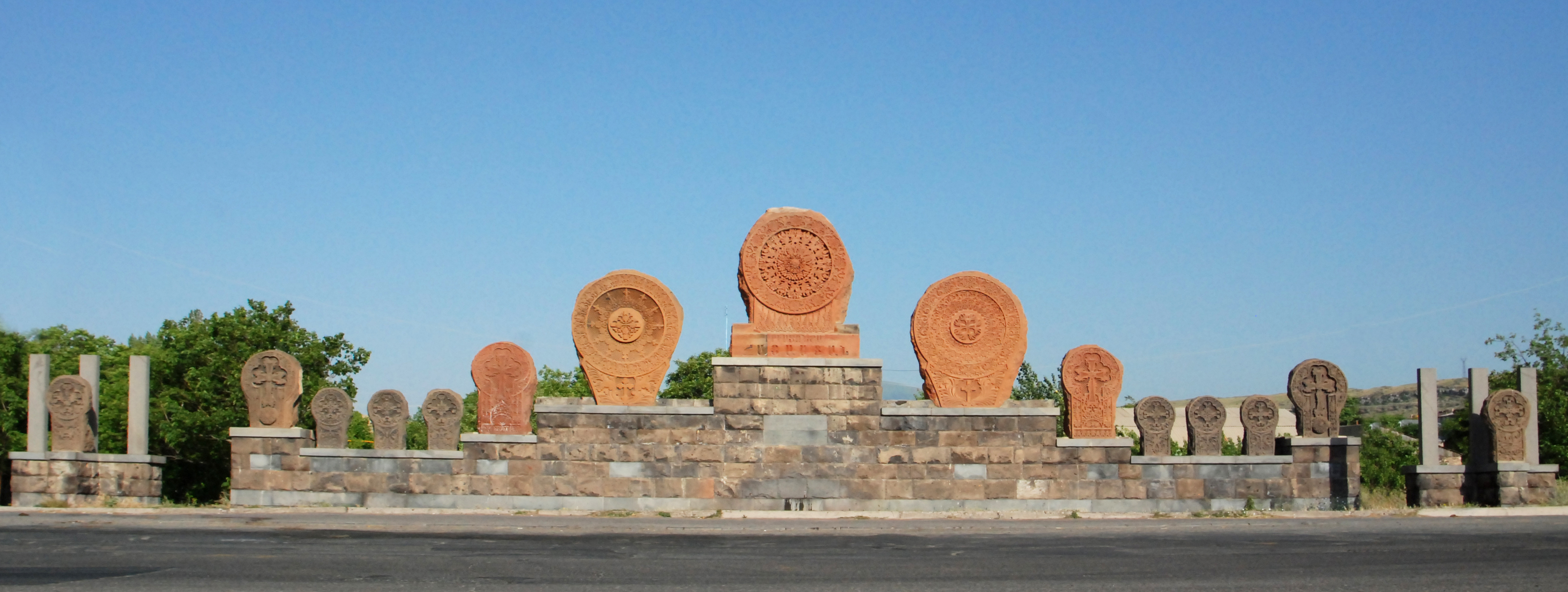
"Christian Armenia" memorial in Argel

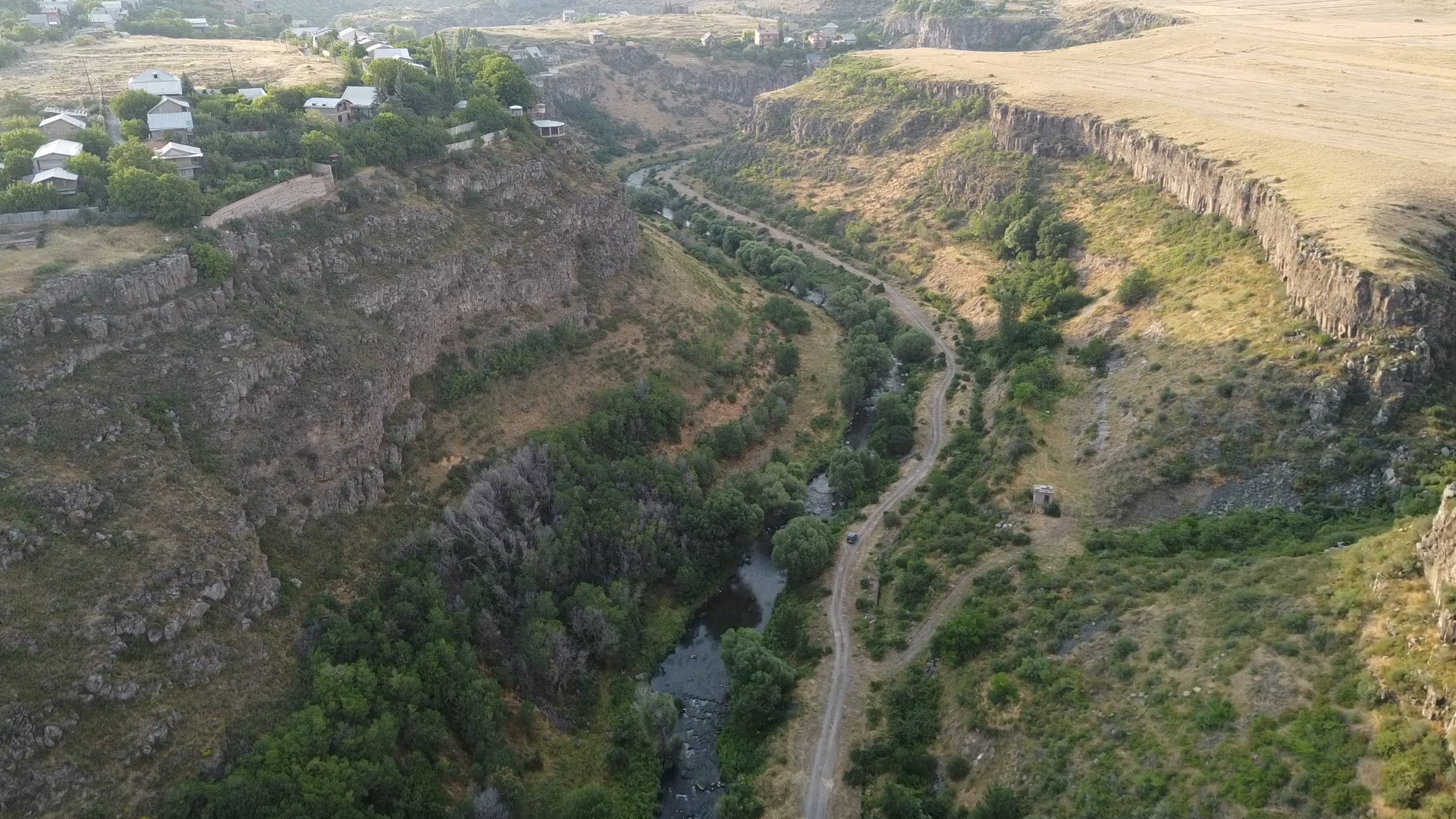
Hrazdan River Gorge and Argel Village (left)

Argel village, view from above

== See also ==
- Kotayk Province
