= Lusakert, Ararat =

Lusakert
- Location within Armenia Location within Ararat
- Coordinates: 40°02′42″N 44°32′23″E
- Country: Armenia
- Marz (Province): Ararat
- Time zone: UTC+4 ( )
  - Summer (DST): UTC+5 ( )

Lusakert (also, Arpavar) is a town in the Ararat Province of Armenia.

== See also ==
- Ararat Province
