= Khachaghbyur =

Village in Gegharkunik, Armenia

Khachaghbyur Խաչաղբյուր
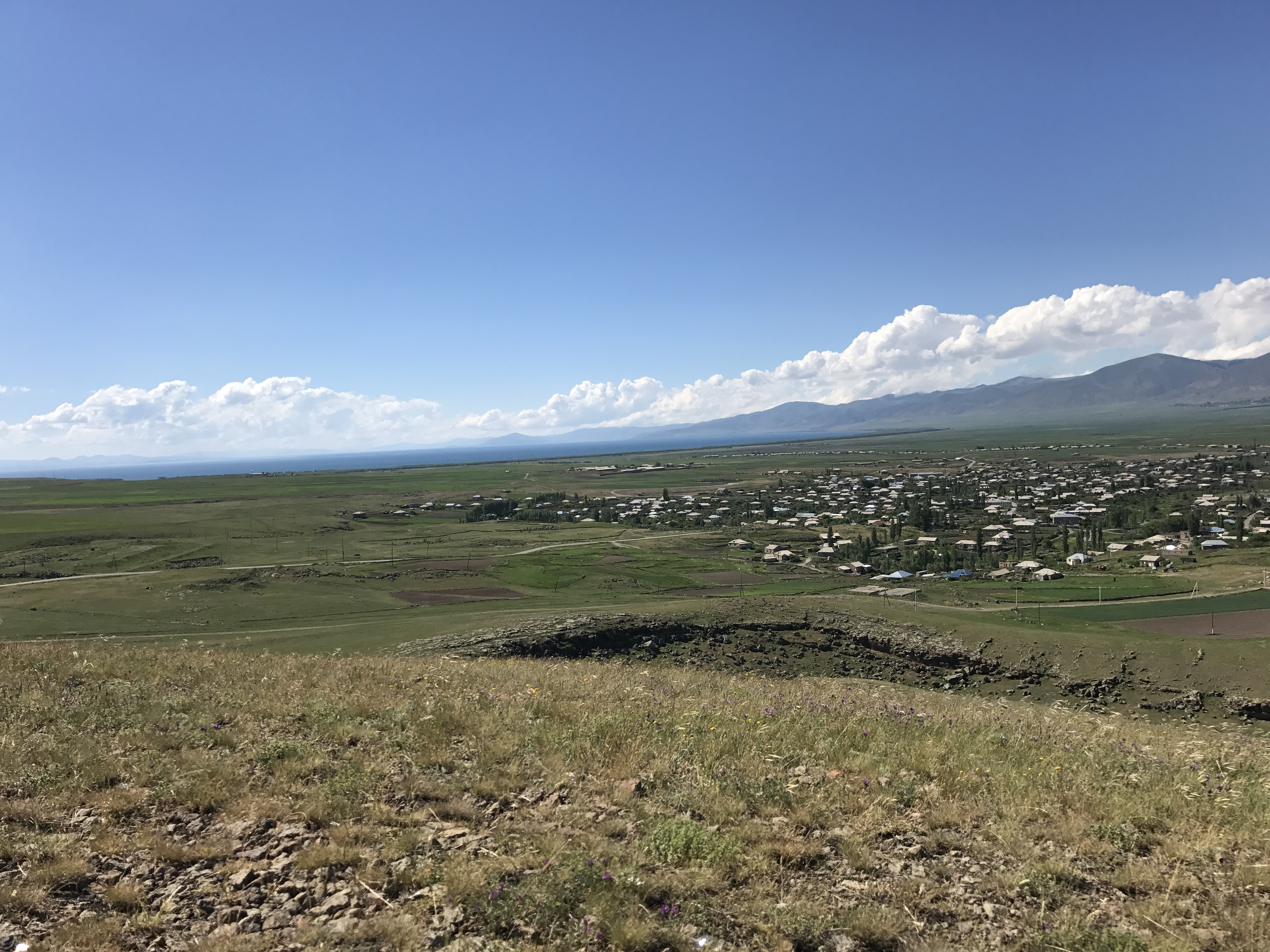
- A view of Khachaghbyur from Murad Khach

- Location within Armenia Location within Gegharkunik
- Coordinates: 40°10′20″N 45°41′19″E
- Country: Armenia
- Province: Gegharkunik
- Municipality: Vardenis

Population (2011)
  - Total: 1,064
- Time zone: UTC+4 (AMT)

Khachaghbyur (Armenian: Խաչաղբյուր) is a village in the Vardenis Municipality of the Gegharkunik Province of Armenia. The village is located immediately to the south of the Lusakunk village and to the west of Vardenis.

== Etymology ==
The village was previously known as Chakhyrlu, Chakhrlu, Chakhirlu, Sovietakert and Sovetakert.

== History ==
Near the village is a ruined Iron Age fort, Murad Khach, as well as a 13th-century church.

== Gallery ==
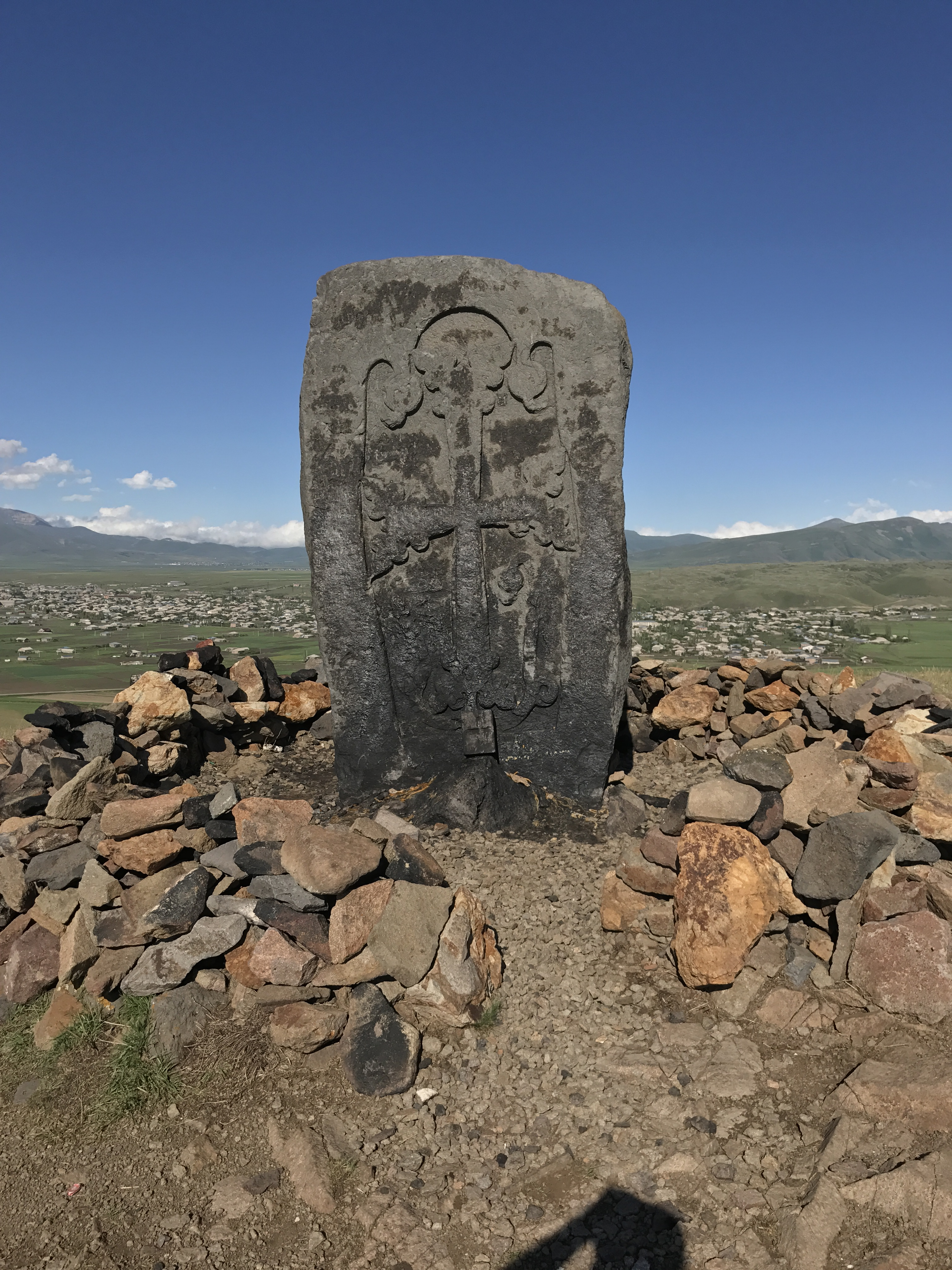
Khachkar on Murad Khach

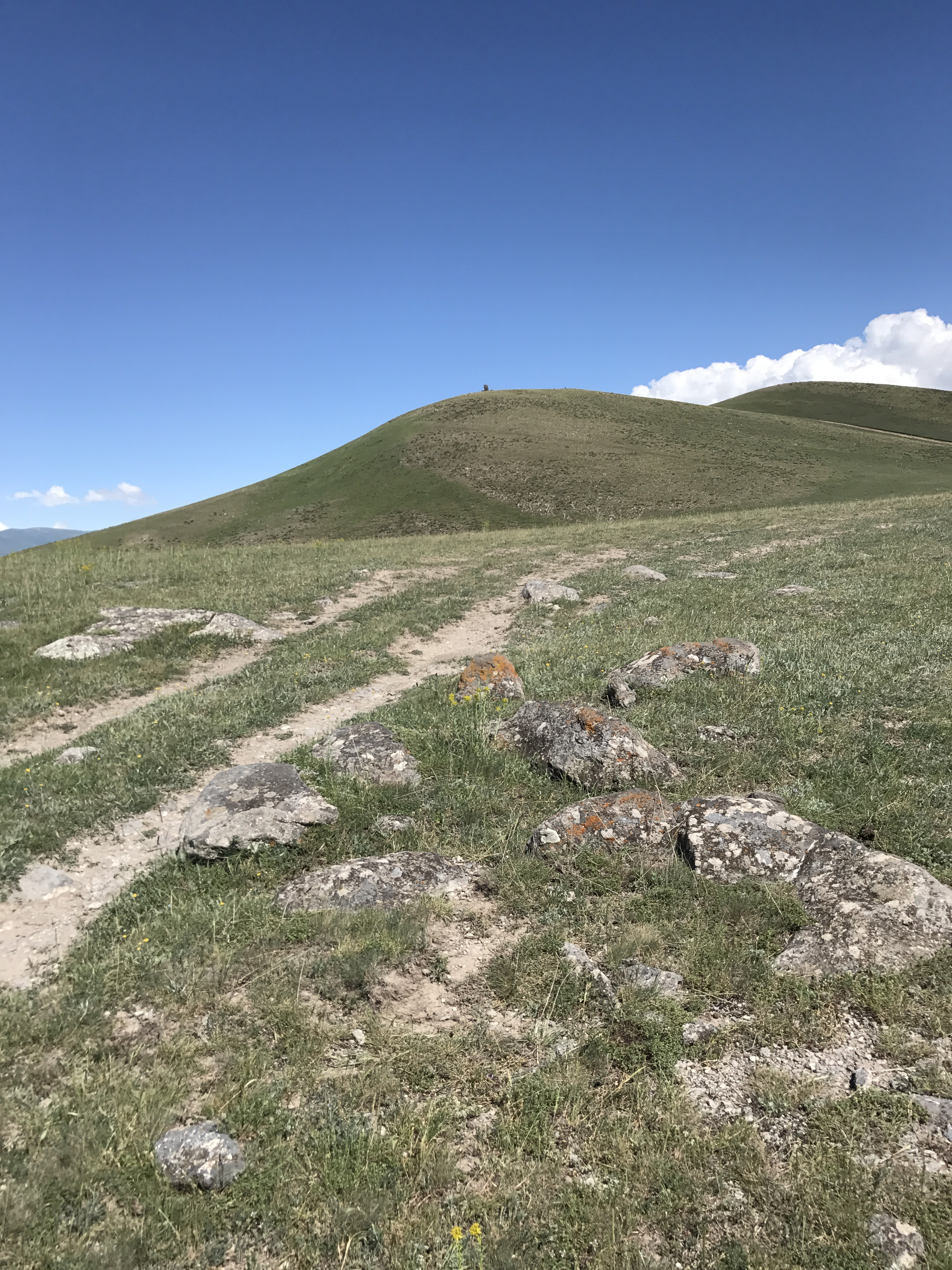
Murad Khach
