= Armenian Ground Forces =

Branch of the Armenian armed forces

Ground Forces of Armenia
- Հայաստանի ցամաքային ուժեր Hayastani ts’amak’ayin uzher
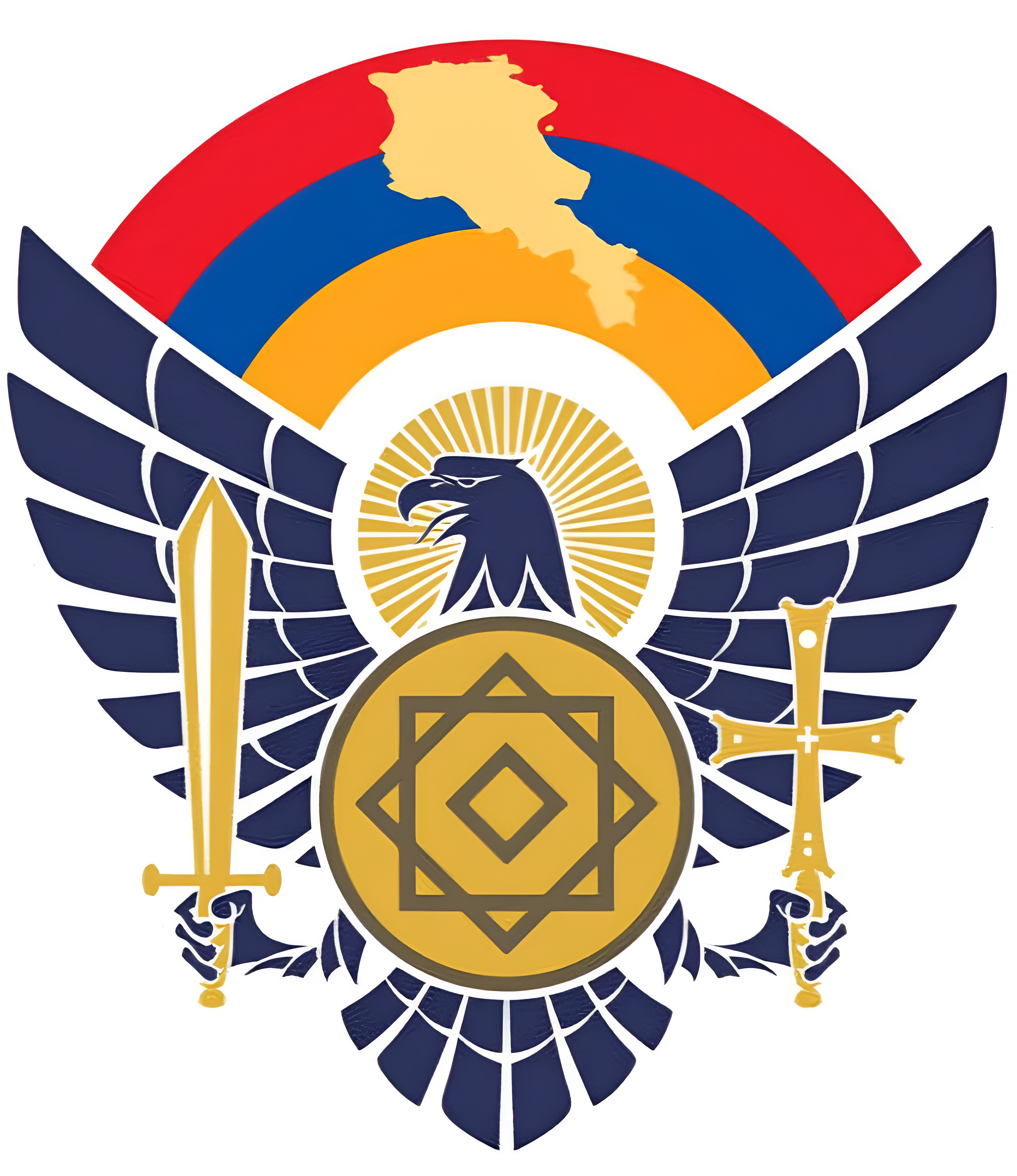
- Emblem of the Armenian Army
- Founded: 28 January 1992
- Country: Armenia
- Type: Army
- Role: Ground warfare
- Size: 65,000 (including 40,000 professional and 25,000 conscripts) (2023 census)
- Part of: Armenian Armed Forces
- Patron: Ashot II the Iron (the "Guardian of the Armenian Army")
- March: Our name is Armenian Army
- Anniversaries: Army Day (28 January)
- Engagements: First Nagorno-Karabakh War; 2016 Nagorno-Karabakh conflict Second Nagorno-Karabakh War

Commanders
- Notable commanders: Vazgen Sargsyan; Arkady Ter-Tatevosyan

The Armenian Ground Forces (Armenian: Հայաստանի ցամաքային ուժեր) is the collective term for personnel branches of the General Staff of the Armed Forces of Armenia that are responsible for the country's land-based operations. It was established in conjunction with the other components of Armenia's military on January 28, 1992, several months after the republic declared its independence from the Soviet Union. The army's first head was the former deputy commander-in-chief of the main staff of the Soviet Ground Forces, Norat Ter-Grigoryants.

Since the end of the First Nagorno-Karabakh War, Armenia has committed many elements of the army to help bolster the defense and defend the unrecognized Republic of Artsakh from a possible renewal of hostilities with neighboring Azerbaijan. Jane's World Armies reports that both conscripts and officers from Armenia are routinely sent for duty to Artsakh, often posted to the frontline between Artsakh Armenian and Azerbaijani forces.

Equipment in the ground forces is regulated by the Military Industry Committee under the Armenian Government.

== History ==
The Armenian army's history is described to have gone through three stages of development. It entered the first stage in February 1988, from the beginning of the Nagorno-Karabakh conflict, when Armenian militias were formed to combat Azerbaijani units in Artsakh. On 20 September 1990, the first military unit was created, the Yerevan Special Regiment, with the first oath being held in the Republican Assembly Point and was attended by the first President of Armenia Levon Ter-Petrosyan, Prime Minister Vazgen Manukyan, Vazgen Sargsyan. The second phase of the development of the army began in 1992, several months after Armenia declared its independence from the Soviet Union. Ter-Grigoryants and civilian officials in the Armenian Ministry of Defense, including Vazgen Manukyan and Vazgen Sargsyan, sought to establish a "small, well-balanced, combat-ready defense force." The third phase began after the end of the war and continues to today.

Most of the army's staff officers were members of the former Soviet military. An estimated 5,000 Armenians were serving as high-level officers in the military at the time of the collapse of the Soviet Union. Almost immediately after its independence, Armenia was embroiled in the First Nagorno-Karabakh War with neighboring Azerbaijan. Intending to establish a force of 30,000 men, the army's standing force increased to 50,000 by early 1994. During the war, the military remained on high alert and bolstered defenses in the region of Zangezur, opposite the Azerbaijani exclave of Nakhichevan. Purported artillery bombardment in May 1992 from the region led to skirmishes between the two sides, including the Armenian army's incursion into several villages into Nakhichevan. The Armenian government invited Norat Ter-Grigoryants to assume command of the Ground Forces in 1992. The position of the overall Armenian Ground Forces commander was phased out in the course of the ongoing military reform by Levon Ter-Petrosyan. His development of the ground forces emphasized the role of motorized brigades to allow for operational mobility and flexibility.

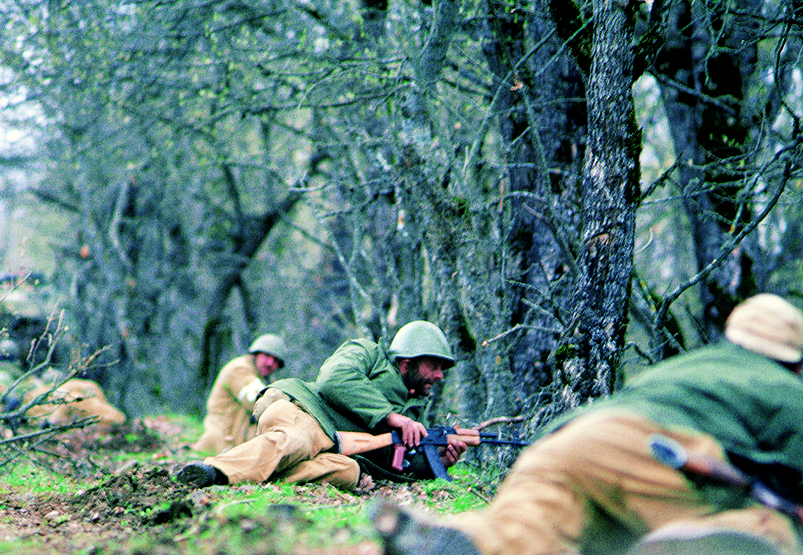
Armenian forces in Nagorno-Karabakh during the First Nagorno-Karabakh War

Since 1994, the army has taken an active role in ensuring the defense of the Republic of Artsakh in conjunction with the Artsakh Defense Army. In conjunction with its strategic allies, Armenia has sent over 1,500 officers to be trained in Greece and Russia. The Armenian Ministry of Defense also established in 2004 a joint partnership with the Kansas National Guard in order to exchange knowledge and facilitate cooperation in national security and civilian affairs. It also signed a military cooperation plan with Lebanon on November 27, 2015.

== Structure ==
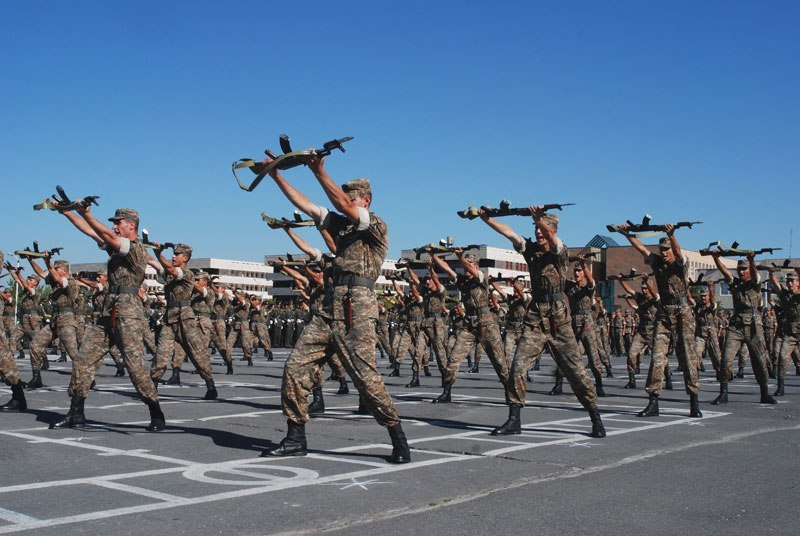
Armenian soldiers training at the Vazgen Sargsyan Military Institute.

=== Field Forces ===
- Special Army Corps (HQ Goris): one independent tank battalion, one independent reconnaissance battalion, four motor rifle regiments, one independent artillery battalion, one independent rocket artillery battalion, one signals battalion, one independent rifle regiment, one maintenance battalion.
- 2nd Army Corps (HQ Khachaghbyur): one independent tank battalion, one independent reconnaissance battalion, one independent rifle regiment, three independent motor rifle regiments, one independent artillery battalion, one independent reconnaissance battalion, one independent rocket artillery battalion, one signals battalion, one maintenance battalion.
- 3rd Army Corps (HQ Vanadzor): one independent rifle regiment, one independent artillery battalion, one independent tank battalion, one independent reconnaissance battalion, one independent rocket artillery battalion, four independent motor rifle regiments, one maintenance battalion, one signals battalion, one independent rifle regiment.
- 5th Army Corps (HQ Nubarashen in Yerevan): two fortified regions, three independent motor rifle regiment, one independent rifle regiment, one independent rocket artillery battalion, one independent artillery battalion, one independent tank battalion, one independent reconnaissance battalion, one signals battalion, one maintenance battalion.

=== Army-level Troops ===
The army also has the following army level units:

- 228th Air & Air Defense Command (Jane's World Armies mentions an Army Air and Air Defence at Chobankara)
  - Surface to Air Missile Brigade
  - Surface to Air Missile Regiment
  - Surface to Air Missile Regiment
  - Surface to Air Missile Regiment
  - Radio-Technical Brigade
- 535th Training Motor Rifle Brigade
- 1st Special Forces Brigade (Nubarashen)
- One surface-to-air missile brigade
- Two surface-to-air missile brigades
- Four Mixed artillery brigades
- One radiotechnical (radar) brigade
- One tank brigade
- One anti-tank brigade
- One engineer regiment with demining centre

=== Special Forces ===
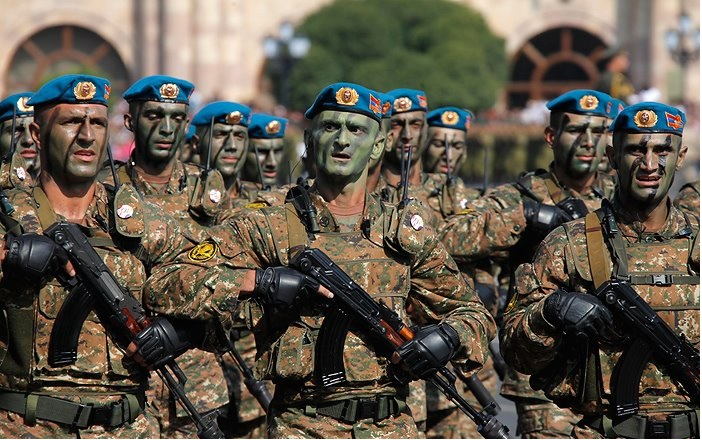
Airborne regiment soldiers during a parade in 2011

The Armenian military's special forces include a standard army special forces regiment (now grown into a brigade), and 4 reconnaissance battalions. The operational history surrounding all the aforementioned groups is not known. The operations that are known and are outside of standard duties such as intelligence gathering include:

- Unknown number of cross-border raids
- The securing of the Armenian pilot's remains and helicopter parts after the shoot-down of an Artsakh helicopter

The special forces of both republics are allowed fast-attack vehicles to conduct some operations and exercises. Special Forces Day is celebrated on 5 November.

== March ==
Our name is the Armenian Army (Armenian: Մեր անունն է հայկական բանակ, romanized: tr, lit. 'Mer anunn e haykakan banak') is an Armenian military march that serves as the army anthem. The song is part of the traditional repertoire of the Band of the General Staff of the Armed Forces. The march is composed of the following verses:

Orbitu puts the new stone on the old.
Our name is the Armenian builder,
Sowing and downpour.
Our name is the fair Armenian farmer,
His child should know his writing
May the Armenian mind live forever.

Our hearts are always strong, fiery,
Our swords are always strong, sharp,
And let everyone know
Our name is the Armenian army.

The ark of our millennial Armenian history
It has taken us around the world,
Our dear cradle calls us back:
Always faithful to his longing,
This new century will be ours:
In a brightly lit way.

Our hearts are always strong, fiery,
Our swords are always strong and sharp
And let everyone know
Our name is the Armenian army

Our ancestral Armenian lands
We will keep night and day,
Let all Armenian mothers sleep peacefully,
We will monitor their peace.
Father Hayk's land handed over to us
We will inherit our children.

Our hearts are always strong, fiery,
Our swords are always strong, sharp,
And let everyone know
Our name is the Armenian army.

The seal of our millennial Armenian history
We carry it forever
May the Armenian sky always be peaceful
And the mountains are fiery

Even if it is required, we will give our lives
For the glory of our homeland.

Our hearts are always strong, fiery
Our swords are always strong, sharp
And let everyone know
Our name is the Armenian army.

== See also ==
- Armenian Air Force
- Military history of Armenia
- List of equipment of the Armenian Armed Forces
