= Stepan Galstyan =

- Born: May 15, 1963 (age 63); Maralik, Ani Municipality, Armenian SSR, USSR (now in Shirak Province, Armenia)
- Spouse: Natalya
- Children: 3
- Military career
- Allegiance: Armenia
- Branch: Soviet Air Forces; Armenian Air Force
- Service years: 1982-2021
- Rank: Lieutenant-General

Stepan Roberti Galstyan (Armenian: Ստեփան Ռոբերտի Գալստյան) was an Armenian military commander. He was the Chief of General Staff of Armenian Armed Forces for 12 days from 10 March 2021 to 22 March 2021.

== Early life and career ==
In 1982, he graduated from the Leninkan Light Industry Technical School in Gyumri. From 1983 to 1992 he served in the Soviet Air Forces. In 1988, he graduated from the Armavir Military Aviation School of Pilots. In 1992, following the Dissolution of the Soviet Union and the Independence of Armenia, he joined the Armenian Armed Forces and specifically the Armenian Air Force. He held the positions of commander of an aviation squadron, military unit, and then base.

== Command positions ==
In 2003, President Robert Kocharyan appointed him Head of Aviation and Head of the Aviation Department of the Ministry of Defense of the Republic of Armenia, the de facto head of the Armenian Air Force. In 2007, he was promoted the military rank of Major General. By decree of President Serzh Sargsyan on the eve of Army Day on January 26, 2009, he was appointed Deputy Chief of the General Staff of the Armed Forces.

In 2012, he was promoted to the military rank of Lieutenant General. In June 2018, President Armen Sarkissian appointed him Deputy Chief of the General Staff. He became acting Chief of General Staff of Armenian Armed Forces on 10 March 2021, following the controversial dismissal of his predecessor Onik Gasparyan. Gasparyan was dismissed after calling for the resignation of Prime Minister Nikol Pashinyan on 25 February 2021 along with more than 40 other high-ranking Armenian military officers in the General Staff of the Armenian Armed Forces. Galstyan served until 22 March 2021, when Lieutenant General Artak Davtyan returned to the position and he returned to the role of Deputy Chief. On 16 December 2021, Galstyan retired from the armed forces.

== Investigations ==
On October 2, 2021, the National Security Service arrested Galstyan within the framework of a criminal case investigating abuse of power and large-scale embezzlement related to military ammunition supplies. He, alongside Defence Minister David Tonoyan, were accused of purchasing faulty weapons to the Armed Forces of Armenia. He was released on bail.

=== Assets ===
Following a 2019 change in asset-declaration laws, a massive amount of previously unmentioned real estate appeared in Galstyan's declarations, to include 8 plots of land in Maralik and 2 plots in Jrvezh. The property held by his wife, Natalya Galstyan, was even more expansive, to include 20 plots of land spread across Vayots Dzor Province and Shirak Province, 3 private houses and a 2016 Mercedes-Benz C-Class that went unrecorded in her initial 2016 declaration of assets.

=== Registered plane ===
Another investigation from 2012 involving an Armenian cargo plane that crashed in Brazzaville, Congo, killing seven crew members (including five Armenians) saw the revealing of the fact that the plane, which belonged to "Ridge Airways" belonged to Galstyan and was registered to his wife, who had been the director of Ridge Airways since 2011. The aircraft had allegedly been operating illegally without the proper permits for months leading up to the fatal crash.

== Awards ==
- "Vardan Mamikonyan" medal
- Jubilee Medal "60 Years of Victory in the Great Patriotic War 1941–1945"
- "Marshal Baghramyan" medal
- Combat Service Medal
- "Andranik Ozanyan" medal
- Medal "For Impeccable Service" of the 1st degree
- "Maternal Gratitude" medal
- Medal "For Services to the Fatherland" 2nd degree
- Medal "For Strengthening Cooperation"
- Jubilee Medal "10 years of the Joint CIS Air Defense System"
- Jubilee Medal "50 Years of Victory in the Great Patriotic War 1941–1945"
- Yerkrapah commemorative medal
