= Tumanyan =

Tumanyan or T’umanyan or Tumanian (Armenian: Թումանյան) is an Armenian surname and may refer to:

== People ==
- Alla Tumanian (born 1950), Armenian-American theatre and film actress
- Armine Tumanyan (born 1975), Armenian painter, designer, coordinator of painting exhibitions
- Barseg Tumanyan, Armenian bass opera singer; soloist with the Alexandrov Ensemble
- Hovhannes Tumanyan (1869–1923), Armenian poet, writer, translator, literary and public activist
- Nune Tumanyan (born 963), Armenian artist and sculptor
- Ruben Tumanyan (born 1969), Armenian producer and screenwriter
- Samvel Tumanyan (born 1949), Armenian politician
- Tamar Tumanyan (1907–1989), Soviet Armenian architect and daughter of Hovhannes Tumanyan
- Tuman Tumanian (1879–1906), participant of the Armenian national liberation movement

== Places ==
- Dsegh, Armenia
- Tumanyan, Armenia
- Tumanyan Park in Yerevan, Armenia
