= Mikael Harutyunyan =

Armenian general

- Միքայել Հարությունյան

Defence Minister of Armenia
- In office 4 April 2007 – 14 April 2008
- President: Robert Kocharyan; Serzh Sargsyan
- Preceded by: Serzh Sargsyan
- Succeeded by: Seyran Ohanyan

Chief of the General Staff of the Armenian Armed Forces
- In office 1995 – 4 April 2007
- President: Levon Ter-Petrosyan; Robert Kocharyan
- Preceded by: Norat Ter-Grigoryants
- Succeeded by: Seyran Ohanyan

Personal details
- Born: 10 February 1946 (age 80) Sagiyan, Azerbaijan SSR, Soviet Union
- Party: Independent
- Education: Frunze Military Academy; Soviet Union General Staff Academy
- Awards: see below

Military service
- Branch/service: Soviet Army; Armenian Ground Forces
- Years of service: 1963–2007
- Rank: Colonel General

Mikael Harutyuni Harutyunyan (Armenian: Միքայել Հարությունի Հարությունյան; born 10 February 1946) is an Armenian general who served as the Defence Minister of Armenia from 4 April 2007 until 14 April 2008. From 14 April 2008 to 24 May 2018, he served as Chief Military Inspector and advisor to the President of Armenia. From 1995 to 2007, he served as the Chief of the General Staff of the Armenian Armed Forces. He currently resides in Russia and is wanted in Armenia on charges related to the violence during the 2008 Armenian presidential election protests.

== Early life and career ==
Harutyunyan was born and grew up in the village of Sagiyan in central Azerbaijan SSR. He graduated from the Baku Higher Combined Arms Command School in 1967. Harutyunyan served in the Soviet Armed Forces and was stationed in East Germany from 1967 to 1973. In 1976, he graduated from the reconnaissance department of Frunze Military Academy. From 1976 to 1983, he was stationed in the Transcaucasian Military District. In 1988, he graduated from the USSR Armed Forces General Staff Military Academy. He was a senior lecturer at the academy from 1988 to 1992. In 1992, then President of Armenia Levon Ter-Petrosyan appointed him First Deputy Chief of the General Staff of Armenian Armed Forces and Chief of Operations.

In 1994, he was promoted to the rank of major general. In 1997, he was appointed Chief of General Staff of Armenian Armed Forces and First Deputy Minister of Defence. He received the rank of lieutenant general in 1996 and that of colonel general in 2002.

== Appointment as defence minister ==
On 26 March 2007, Defence Minister Serzh Sargsyan, was appointed Prime Minister of Armenia after the sudden death of Andranik Margaryan. The post of defence minister was vacant until 4 April 2007 when Colonel General Mikael Harutyunyan was appointed to the post of Defence Minister. Before being appointed to the post, Harutyunyan was First Deputy Defence Minister.

== Appointment as advisor to the President ==
On 14 April 2008, the newly elected president of Armenia, Serzh Sargsyan, signed two decrees: one appointing Mikael Harutyunyan as Chief Military Inspector, and another appointing him as a presidential advisor, with the hope that his skill and experience would prove useful in the continual development of the military. Harutyunyan was succeeded by Seyran Ohanyan as minister of defence.

== Legal issues ==
In July 2018, Harutyunyan came under investigation in connection with the violent crackdown during the 2008 Armenian presidential election protests, which occurred during his tenure as minister of defence. On 3 July 2018, he was charged with "overthrowing the constitutional order" and accused of giving permission to use the armed forces against civilians. An order issued by Harutyunyan was declassifed, which barracked troops and set up and armed "special groups" before the crackdown on protestors in Yerevan. After a warrant was issued for his arrest, Harutyunyan's wife stated that her husband had gone to Russia for medical treatment. In September 2018, it was reported that Russia had removed Harutyunyan from its list of wanted suspects. The Russian news agency Interfax reported that Harutyunyan has been a Russian citizen since 2002. Russian officials confirmed that Harutyunyan has Russian citizenship in December 2018; Russia's constitution forbids the extradition of Russian nationals. An Armenian investigation confirmed that Harutyunyan had received Russian citizenship in 2002, at which time he was Chief of the General Staff. Armenia's constitution did not allow for dual citizenship until 2006. In May 2021, the charges against Harutyunyan were changed to "exceeding official authority, which negligently caused grave consequences".

== Personal life ==
He is the youngest male in a family of 5 sisters and 2 brothers. His entire family members left Azerbaijan after the beginning of the Nagorno-Karabakh conflict, including his elder brother Vladimir, who also joined the army. According to a report by journalist Eynulla Fatullayev, Harutyunyan's sister Zoya Arutyunova currently resides in Kurdamir in central Azerbaijan, and his nephew has served in Nakhchivan in the Azerbaijani Armed Forces.

== Awards ==
He is a recipient of orders and decorations of USSR, the Republic of Armenia and foreign states:

- (Armenia) Order of the Combat Cross, 2nd degree
- (Armenia) Medal "For Services to the Fatherland", 1st degree
- (Armenia) Medal "For Services to the Fatherland", 2nd degree
- (Armenia) Order of Vardan Mamikonian
- (Armenia) Order of Nerses the Gracious
- (Armenia) Mesrop Mashtots Medal
- (Armenia) Medal of Marshal Baghramyan
- (Armenia) Andranik Ozanyan Medal
- (Armenia) Medal "For Distinguished Service", 1st class
- (Armenia) Medal "For Distinguished Service", 2nd class
- (Republic of Artsakh) Order of the Combat Cross, 2nd degree
- (France) Legion of Honour
- (Russia) Medal "For Strengthening Military Cooperation"

== See also ==
- First Nagorno-Karabakh War
- Nagorno-Karabakh conflict
- Seyran Ohanyan
- Seyran Shahsuvaryan

Political offices
Preceded by Serzh Sargsyan	Defence Minister of Armenia; 2007–2008	Succeeded by Seyran Ohanyan
