= Dangerous Games (TV series) =

- Genre: Drama
- Developed by: Anush Petrosyan
- Starring: Levon Sharafyan; Alla Tumanyan; Razmik Mansuryan; Khachatur Hunanyan
- Composer: Gor Yephremyan
- Country of origin: United States; Armenia
- Original languages: Armenian; English
- No. of seasons: 1
- No. of episodes: 289

Production
- Executive producers: Vaagn Sarkissyan; David Adamyan
- Production locations: Los Angeles, United States
- Editors: Arsen Saribekyan; Davit Hovhannisyan; Hovik Mitoyan
- Running time: 30-32 minutes

Original release
- Network: USA Armenia, Kentron TV
- Release: December 14, 2015 – present

Related
- If Only (Armenian TV series)

Dangerous Games is an Armenian drama television series created by Anush Petrosyan. The series premiered on Kentron TV on December 14, 2015. Director of the series is Angel Martirosyan, who is also a member of cast. Camera operator is Armenian-American Vahe Avedian. Screenwriter is Rafayel Tadevosyan. Production manager is Gegham Margaryan. Sound engineer is Bahieh Claggett. The series takes place in California, United States.

== Cast and characters ==
- Armen Zargaryan as Mark
- Levon Sharafyan
- Alla Tumanyan
- Razmik Mansuryan
- Khachatur Hunanyan
- Vahan Margaryan
- Angel Martirosyan
- Lusine Gasparyan
- Susanna Nidelyan
- Anna Panni
- Marine Minasyan
- Hayk Grigoryan
- Artur Sukiasyan
- Edgar Rostomyan
- Albert Diloyan
- Davit Sargsyan
- Vartan Torosyan
- Stepan Babujyan
- Mkrtich Setoyan
- Dwayne Johnson
- Alton Mills
- Bianca Doria
- Slim Khezri
- Stephon Steward
- Akrem Abdu
- Destiny Soria
- Troy Musil
- Mike Hro
- Gor Yepremyan as Gor
