= Seyran Shahsuvaryan =

Armenian general (born 1953)

Seyran Nikolayi Shahsuvaryan (Armenian: Սեյրան Նիկոլայի Շահսուվարյան, born August 13, 1953, in Yerevan, Armenian SSR) is the former press secretary of the Ministry of Defence of Armenia.

== Early life and career ==
He was born on August 13, 1953, in Yerevan. In 1974 he graduated from the Khachatur Abovian Armenian State Pedagogical University and became the director of the house of culture in Nairi that same year. He joined the Soviet Army in 1975 and served for one year before leaving in 1976. From 1970 to 1993, Shahsuvaryan worked in the Public Television Service of the Armenian SSR. In 1993, he became the head of the culture department, then the head of information and press department of the Ministry of Defence of Armenia. In 1997, he became the deputy head of the Nork TV studio (NTV). In 1998, he was appointed head of Nork TV. In 1999, he became deputy head of information and censorship department under the Armenian government and in 2000 he became the head of the TV studio Prometei.

=== Press Secretary of the Armenian Defense Ministry ===
In 2001, he was appointed press secretary of the Ministry of Defence.

On January 7, 2002, Turkish Army chief of General Staff General Hüseyin Kıvrıkoğlu made a statement that Armenia had weapons of mass destruction. Shahsuvaryan dismissed this as "an absurd attempt to compromise Armenia in the eyes of the international community."

On July 7, 2007, false accusations were made by Azerbaijan and Turkey, accusing Armenia of buying weapons from Albania. Shahsuvaryan denied this and on September 11, 2007, more false accusations were made by Azerbaijani Defence Minister Safar Abiyev, saying that there were hidden delivered equipment in Armenian bases from both Russia and Georgia, which Shahsuvaryan repeatedly denied.

=== 2008 Presidential Elections ===
During the 2008 Armenian presidential elections and the subsequent protests, Shahsuvaryan denied all claims that ex-president and presidential candidate Levon Ter-Petrossian made, especially Ter-Petrossian's claims that deputy defence ministers Manvel Grigoryan and Gagik Melkonyan supported his 2008 campaign and would join the post-election protests.

== Personal life ==
He is married and has three children. He is currently a member of the Union of Cinematographers and Journalists of Armenia.

He has received the following awards:

- Marshal Baghramyan 100 Memorial Medal
- Garegin Nzdeh Medal (First and Second Degree)
- Fridtjof Nansen Medal.

== See also ==
- Ministry of Defence of Armenia
- Mikael Harutyunyan
- Seyran Ohanyan
- Vigen Sargsyan
- David Tonoyan
