= If Only =

If Only may refer to:

- If Only (2004 film), a film directed by Gil Junger
- If Only, English title for Sana Dati, a 2013 Philippine film
- If Only (2019 film), an Italian film
- If Only (TV series), an Armenian TV series
- If Only (book), Geri Halliwell's 1999 autobiography
- "If Only" (Descendants song), 2015
- "If Only" (KT Tunstall song), 2008
- "If Only" (Hanson song), 2000
- "If Only", song from Away from the World by Dave Matthews Band
- "If Only", song from Popstar: A Dream Come True by Sarah Geronimo
- "If Only", song from Whistle Down the Wind by Andrew Lloyd Webber
- "If Only", song from Every Man for Himself by Hoobastank
- "If Only", song from Kiss Me Once by Kylie Minogue
- "If Only", song from Feeling the Space by Yoko Ono
- "If Only", song from Two by the Calling
- "If Only", song from Gouldian Finch Vol. 2 by San Holo (featuring Eastghost, Analogue Dear, Taska Black, Droeloe, Losi, ILIVEHERE., and GOSLO)
- "If Only", song from Sì by Andrea Bocelli featuring Dua Lipa
- "If Only", song from The Color of Silence by Tiffany
- "If Only", song from When in Rome by When in Rome
- "If Only", song from Queens of the Stone Age by Queens of the Stone Age
- "If Only", song from The Sport of Kings by Triumph
- "If Only", a B-side to the song "Like a Rose" by A1

== See also ==
- Verb tense usage after if only
