= Onik Gasparyan =

Armenian Colonel-General

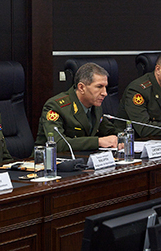

Chief of the General Staff of the Armenian Armed Forces
- In office 8 June 2020 – 10 March 2021
- President: Armen Sarkissian
- Prime Minister: Nikol Pashinyan
- Preceded by: Artak Davtyan
- Succeeded by: Artak Davtyan

Personal details
- Born: January 6, 1970 (age 56) Ijevan, Armenian SSR, Soviet Union

Military service
- Allegiance: Soviet Union; Armenia
- Branch/service: Soviet Army; Armed Forces of Armenia
- Years of service: 1988–1990; 1993–2021
- Rank: Colonel-General
- Unit: General Staff of the Armenian Armed Forces; 3rd Army Corps; Small units
- Commands: Chief of the General Staff of the Armenian Armed Forces; First Deputy Chief of General Staff
- Battles/wars: First Nagorno-Karabakh War; 2020 Nagorno-Karabakh war

Onik Viktori Gasparyan (Armenian: Օնիկ Վիկտորի Գասպարյան; born 6 January 1970) is an Armenian Colonel-General who served as the Chief of the General Staff of the Armenian Armed Forces from 8 June 2020 until his dismissal on 10 March 2021. Gasparyan was dismissed after calling for the resignation of Prime Minister Nikol Pashinyan on 25 February 2021 along with more than 40 other high-ranking Armenian military officers.

== Early life and military career ==
He was born in January 1970. He studied at Secondary School No. 5 in Ijevan from 1976-1985 and at Secondary School No. 147 in Yerevan from 1985-1986. He completed his service in the Soviet Armed Forces from 1988 to 1990. From 1990 to 1993, during the First Nagorno-Karabakh War, he served in the "Saro’s detachment" volunteer unit in his native Ijevan. He joined the Armenian Army in 1993. In 1994, he was seriously wounded in a mine explosion while performing a combat mission. In the mid-90s, he studied at the Vistrel Higher Officer Courses of the Russian Ministry of Defence. He studied and graduated with honours from the Russian Combined Arms Academy of Russia from 1998-2001. From 2001-2005, he was the Commander of Military Unit 51191, where he served before being transferred to Military Unit 68617. He was the Chief of Staff and Deputy Commander of 4th Army Corps from 2007 and 2008. In 2008, he graduated with honours from the Military Academy of the General Staff of the Armed Forces of Russia.

== Further career ==
He became the Chief of Staff and Deputy Commander of 3rd Army Corps in 2010, being promoted to commander on 11 April 2012. He was promoted to the rank of Major General on 21 January 2015, which allowed him to become the Deputy Chief of General Staff in July 2016 and First Deputy Chief of General Staff in June 2017. He became a Lieutenant-General in July 2019. On 8 June 2020, he was appointed Chief of Armed Forces General Staff by order of President Armen Sarkissian at the request of Prime Minister Nikol Pashinyan. Defense Minister David Tonoyan introduced Gasparyan to the command staff of Defense Ministry two days later. He was previously considered for the role in 2018, when the media reported he would be appointed. Gasparyan comes from Ijevan, the same town as Prime Minister Pashinyan, so it was speculated that this could have hindered his appointment, in case there would be any perception of favoritism.

Gasparyan's appointment came shortly before clashes on the Armenian-Azerbaijani border in July 2020, which was followed by the outbreak of the 2020 Nagorno-Karabakh war with Azerbaijan. At the recommendation of Prime Minister Pashinyan, Gasparyan was promoted to the rank of Colonel-General on 15 October 2020, during the war. The 2020 Nagorno-Karabakh war ended in significant material, human and territorial losses for the Armenian side. During the chaos that ensued on the night of November 9–10, after the signing of the ceasefire agreement that ended the war, Gasparyan met with leaders of the opposition and called for calm. Gasparyan later stated that he had advised Prime Minister Pashinyan to take steps to end the hostilities on the fourth day of the 44-day war, but that all attempts to stop the war were rejected by Azerbaijan and Turkey.

== Role in events of February 2021 and aftermath ==
On 25 February 2021, Gasparyan issued a statement signed by more than 40 other high-ranking Armenian military officers calling for the resignation of Prime Minister Pashinyan, stating that Pashinyan and his government "are no longer able to make proper decisions in this fateful moment of crisis for the Armenian people." Gasparyan and the other officers claimed that their demand was triggered by Pashinyan's dismissal of the first deputy chief of the General Staff Tiran Khachatryan a day earlier. Pashinyan condemned the statement as a coup attempt and signed an order dismissing Gasparyan from his post, which was not signed by Armenia's president Armen Sargsyan. Pashinyan immediately resent the motion to dismiss Gasparyan to the president.

On 26 February, Gasparyan met with President Armen Sargsyan at the General Staff office. At a pro-government rally on 1 March, Pashinyan accused Gasparyan of treason and alleged that he issued the statement calling for Pashinyan's resignation at the suggestion of former president Serzh Sargsyan. On 2 March, President Armen Sargsyan declared his decision once again not to sign the motion to dismiss Gasparyan and to make a separate appeal to the Constitutional Court of Armenia regarding the decision. However, as he did not send the motion itself to the Constitutional Court for review, Gasparyan's dismissal is to come into effect by force of law. The General Staff announced that Gasparyan will stay in his role for eight days after the president makes his appeal to the Constitutional Court. On 10 March, Pashinyan announced that Gasparyan's dismissal had gone into effect and nominated Gasparyan's predecessor Artak Davtyan for Chief of the General Staff. Gasparyan released a statement where he refused to accept his dismissal and announced his intention to dispute his dismissal in court; the leadership of the Armenian Armed Forces also reiterated their support for Gasparyan. On the same day, the Constitutional Court of Armenia announced that it had received an appeal from President Armen Sargsyan in connection with Gasparyan's dismissal. Also on 10 March, the Armenian Ministry of Defense announced that Lieutenant-General Stepan Galstyan would serve as acting Chief of the General Staff until the confirmation of a new Chief.

On 18 March, in response to Gasparyan's legal appeal disputing the constitutionality of his dismissal, the Administrative Court of Armenia published a decision by which Gasparyan would retain the post of Chief of the General Staff pending a final ruling. The Pashinyan government rejected this on the grounds that Gasparyan's dismissal had already gone into effect "by force of law." Prime Minister Pashinyan announced that the appointment of Artak Davtyan as Gasparyan's replacement had gone into effect by force of law on 22 March 2021, as President Sargsyan neither signed the order nor sent it to the country's Constitutional Court. In November 2021, Armenia's Constitutional Court recognized Gasparyan's dismissal as constitutional.

== Post-military role ==
During the 2021 Armenian parliamentary election, he supported ex-president Robert Kocharyan's Armenia Alliance between Reborn Armenia and the Armenian Revolutionary Federation. Gasparyan, in an op-ed to an Armenian newspaper, accused the Prime Minister of stoking populist rhetoric in the lead up to the election.

== Awards ==
- Medal "For Merit to the Fatherland" 1st degree (2014)
- Medal "For Courage"
- Medal "20 Years of the Armed Forces of the Republic of Armenia"
- Medal of Marshal Baghramyan
- Medal "Drastamat Kanayan"
- Medal "Vazgen Sargsyan"
- Medal "Garegin Nzhdeh"
- Medal "For Military Merit"
- Medal "For Impeccable Service" I degree
- Medal "For Impeccable Service" II degree
- Medal "For Impeccable Service" III degree
- Medal "For Impeccable Service" IV degree
