= International recognition of the Khojaly massacre =

The Khojaly massacre was the mass killing of at least 161 Azerbaijani civilians by Armenian forces and the 366th CIS regiment in the town of Khojaly on 25 February 1992.

== Azerbaijan ==
Azerbaijan considers international recognition of the massacre as an important part of its foreign policy. The government of Azerbaijan refers to the event as a genocide, and aims to raising international awareness of the massacre, and its root causes within the Nagorno-Karabakh conflict. In 2007, Heydar Aliyev Foundation organised an exhibition of photographs and children's paintings titled "Victims of aggression" in Brussels on 26 February, and held commemorative ceremonies in Istanbul and 25 provinces of Turkey as a part of "Khojaly Week" in 19–26 February. On 14 February 2008, the same foundation organised a conference titled "Khojaly massacre and realities of 1915 events" in Berlin.

== International organizations ==
The following international organizations have referred to the Khojaly events as a massacre in official statements or reports, including:

- Human Rights Watch
- Organization of Islamic Cooperation
- Turkic Council

== Parliaments and governments ==
Commonwealth of Massachusetts Citation for acknowledgment of the 18th commemoration of Khojaly massacre.

In recent years, parliaments of several countries have formally recognized the event as a massacre.

=== Countries ===
==== As massacre ====
- Bosnia and Herzegovina – The House of Peoples passed a resolution condemning the Khojaly Massacre as a crime against humanity in 2014.
- Czech Republic – Foreign Affairs Committee of the Czech Parliament condemned the Khojaly Massacre as a crime against humanity in 2013.
- Colombia – Foreign Relations Committee of the Colombian House of Representatives recognized the Khojaly Massacre in 2013.
- Djibouti – The National Assembly of Djibouti recognized the Khojaly Massacre in 2017.
- Mexico – Foreign Relations Committee of the Mexican Chamber of Deputies recognised the Khojaly Massacre in 2011.
- Paraguay – The Parliament of Paraguay commemorated 26th anniversary of the Khojaly massacre in 2017.
- Panama – The National Assembly of Panama adopted a resolution condemning the Khojaly massacre in 2013.
- Slovenia – The National Council of Slovenia passed a resolution condemning the Khojaly Massacre as a crime against humanity in 2016.
- Sudan – Foreign Affairs Committee of the Sudanese National Assembly recognized the Khojaly Massacre in 2014.
- Estonia – The Estonia-Azerbaijan Parliamentary Friendship Group gave a statement on the Khojaly massacre in 2021.

==== As genocide ====
- Azerbaijan – National Assembly of Azerbaijan recognized the Khojaly massacre as genocide.
- Guatemala – The Congress of Guatemala recognized the Khojaly Massacre referring to it as genocide in 2015.
- Honduras – The National Congress of Honduras recognized the Khojaly Massacre as an act of genocide in 2014.
- Pakistan – Foreign Relations Committee of the Senate of Pakistan recognized the Khojaly Massacre referring to it as genocide in 2012.
- Peru – The Congress of the Republic of Peru adopted a resolution recognizing the Khojaly massacre as genocide in 2013.
- Turkey – Foreign Relations Committee of the Turkish National Assembly recognised the Khojaly Massacre referring to it as genocide in 2012.

== Criticism ==
The recognition of the Khojaly massacre has been widely criticized in academic sources. Oil revenues enable Azerbaijan to utilize "caviar diplomacy", a lobbying strategy of Azerbaijan, consisting of costly invitations and bribes to foreign politicians and employees of international organizations, in order to seek recognition for the Khojaly massacre, including the false characterization of the massacre as a "genocide".
