= 23rd Guards Motor Rifle Division =

Motor rifle division of the Soviet military

23rd Guards Motor Rifle Division (17 November 1964–July 1992) 25th Guards Motor Rifle Division (25 June 1957–17 November 1964) 31st Guards Mechanised Division (January 1946–25 June 1957)
- Active: 1946–1992
- Country: Soviet Union
- Branch: Infantry
- Size: Division
- Part of: 4th Army
- Garrison/HQ: Ganja (named Kirovabad before 1989)
- Engagements: Operation Ring Battle of Shusha (1992)
- Decorations: Order of Lenin; Order of the Red Banner; Order of Suvorov 2nd class
- Battle honours: Brandenburg

The 23rd Guards Motor Rifle Division of the Soviet Union's Red Army was a motor rifle division active during the Cold War. After 1991-92, the division's remnants were eventually incorporated into the new Army of Azerbaijan.

== Cold War ==
After the end of World War II, the 7th Guards Brandenburg Order of Lenin Red Banner Order of Suvorov Cavalry Corps was withdrawn to Nakhchivan. In January 1946, the corps was converted into the 31st Guards Mechanized Division. The 14th and 16th Guards Cavalry Divisions were reduced to the 98th and 99th Guards Mechanized Regiments, respectively. A third mechanized regiment, the 100th Guards, was formed from the 14th Division's 56th Guards Cavalry Regiment. The 131st Guards Tank Regiment was formed from the 16th Division's 58th Guards Cavalry Regiment and the 32nd and 114th Tank Regiments; the latter were the tank regiments of the 16th and 14th Divisions, respectively. In the spring of that year the 31st Guards became part of the 4th Army.

From February 1947, Sergey Akhromeyev was commander of the ISU-122 battalion of the 14th Heavy Tank-Self-Propelled Regiment of the division, then part of the Baku Military District.

On 25 June 1957 the division became the 25th Guards Motor Rifle Division at Shamkir. The 98th Guards became the 366th Guards Motor Rifle Regiment, the 99th Guards the 368th Guards, and the 100th Guards the 370th Guards. On 17 November 1964 it was renumbered as the 23rd Guards Motor Rifle Division.

By the late 1980s, the 23rd Guards was garrisoned in Kirovabad (renamed Ganja in 1989) in the Shahumyan region. In 1988 it included the 366th Guards Motor Rifle Regiment (MRR) (equipped with BMPs) based at Stepanakert, the 368th and 370th Guards MRRs, equipped with BTRs, the 131st Guards Tank Regiment, 1071st Artillery Regiment, and 1057th Anti-Aircraft Rocket Regiment. The division's regimental artillery battalions were equipped with towed D-30 artillery pieces. All units except the 366th Regiment were based at Kirovabad.

Elements of the division took part in Operation Ring in May 1991. During the operation the division's commander was Colonel Budeykin. Immediately following this, the larger scope of combat engagements in the area of Stepanakert took place, including the use of BM-21 "Grad" artillery and Mil Mi-24 assault helicopters through to February 1992.

The division, along with the other three divisions of the 4th Army, was ordered to be withdrawn amidst the fighting in the First Nagorno-Karabakh War in May and June. Elements of the 366th MRR appear to have been involved in the Khojaly massacre of February 1992. The regiment was under the command of Colonel Yuri Zarvigorov. However, on June 21, 1992, the divisional column was prevented from departing Ganja by the civilian Azerbaijani population. The Azerbaijanis demanded that the division surrender its military equipment during Azeri declaration of independence, and the division commander, General Major Yury Pokhamov, complied to avoid civilian casualties. This was largely due to a lack of direction and indecision at Headquarters Transcaucasian Military District and at the General Staff. This did not occur because for the most part the officers of the 366th Motor Rifle Regiment had begun to offer assistance to the Armenian population, while the units based in Ganja deciding to side with the Azeri population. This was largely due to about 50 of the remaining 350 personnel of the 366th Motor Rifle Regiment being Armenian, including the commander of the 2nd Battalion, Major Seyran Ohanyan. Of particular use to the Armenians was the regimental tank company's ten tanks.

The division was disbanded in July 1992, after having been forced to hand over most of its weapons to Azerbaijan. Its traditions, honors and awards were transferred to the 13th Motor Rifle Division.

== Notes ==
=== Bibliography ===
- Feskov, V.I.; Golikov, V.I.; Kalashnikov, K.A.; Slugin, S. A. (2013). Вооруженные силы СССР после Второй Мировой войны: от Красной Армии к Советской [The Armed Forces of the USSR after World War II: From the Red Army to the Soviet: Part 1 Land Forces] (in Russian). Tomsk: Scientific and Technical Literature Publishing. ISBN 9785895035306.
