= Chief of the General Staff (Armenia) =

Highest ranking military office of armenia military force

Chief of the General Staff of Armenian Armed Forces
- ՀՀ Զինված ուժերի Գլխավոր շտաբի պետ
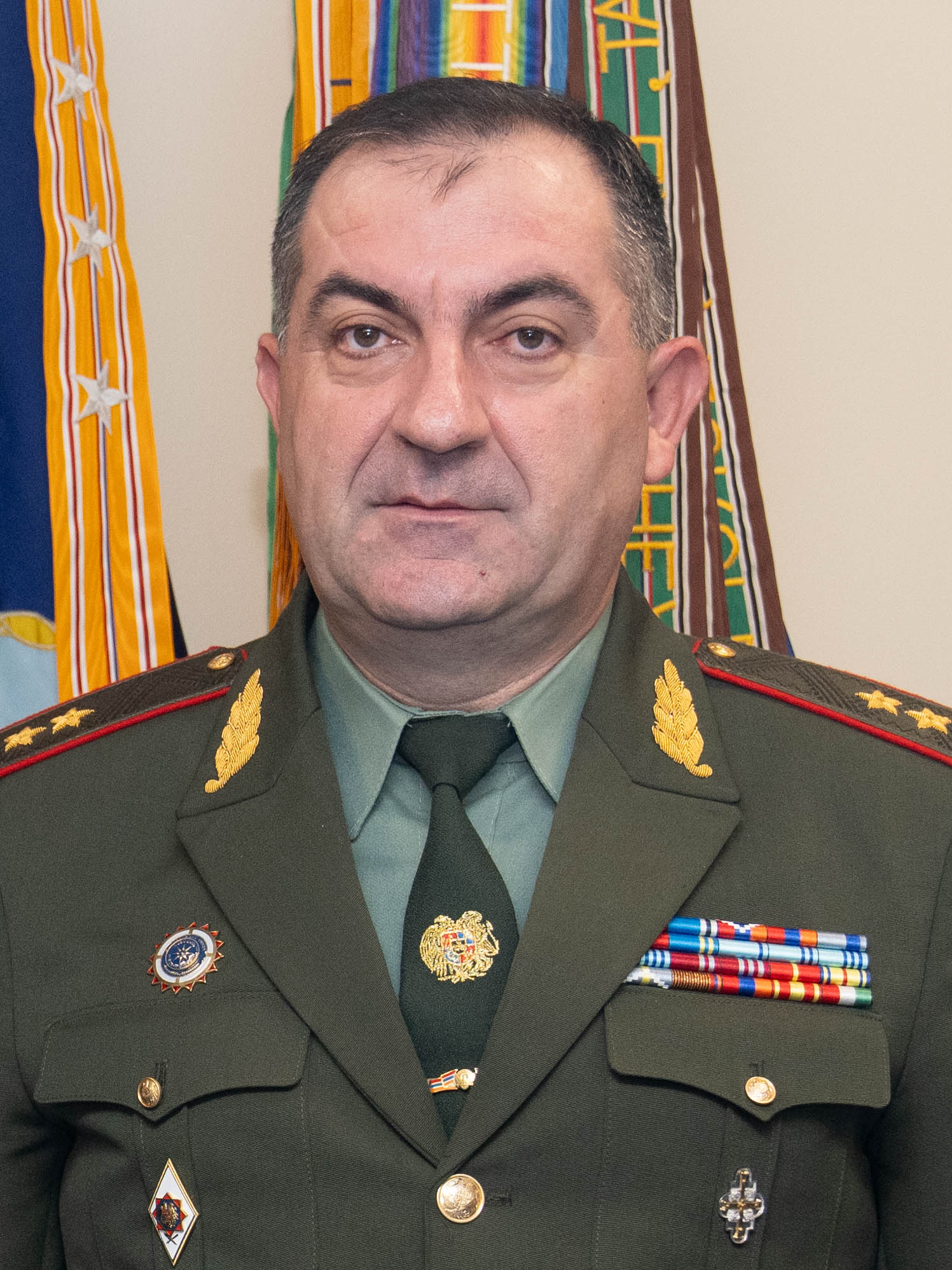
- Incumbent; Lieutenant General Edvard Asryan since 15 July 2022
- Ministry of Defence
- Member of: General Staff
- Reports to: Minister of Defence
- Appointer: President of Armenia
- Term length: 5 years
- Constituting instrument: Constitution of Armenia
- Formation: 1992
- First holder: Gurgen Dalibaltayan
- Deputy: First Deputy Chief of General Staff
- Website: Ministry of Defense of Armenia

The Chief of the General Staff of Armenian Armed Forces (Armenian: ՀՀ Զինված ուժերի Գլխավոր շտաբի պետ, romanized: HH Zinvats uzheri Glkhavor shtabi pet) is the highest-ranking military officer of the Armed Forces of Armenia, who is responsible for maintaining the operational command of the military and its three major branches.

== List of Chiefs ==
No.	Portrait	Name	Took office	Left office	Time in office	Ref.
1	Gurgen Dalibaltayan	Colonel general Gurgen Dalibaltayan (1926–2015)	1991	1992	0–1 years	–
2	Norat Ter-Grigoryants	Lieutenant general Norat Ter-Grigoryants (born 1936)	10 August 1992	1993	0–1 years	–
3	Hrachya Andreasyan	Lieutenant general Hrachya Andreasyan (1932–1999)	1993	12 May 1994	0–1 years	–
4	Mikael Harutyunyan	Colonel general Mikael Harutyunyan (born 1946)	12 May 1994	24 April 2007	12 years, 347 days	–
5	Seyran Ohanyan	Colonel general Seyran Ohanyan (born 1962)	11 May 2007	14 April 2008	339 days	–
6	Yuri Khatchaturov	Colonel general Yuri Khatchaturov (born 1952)	14 April 2008	3 September 2016	8 years, 142 days	–
7	Movses Hakobyan	Lieutenant general Movses Hakobyan (born 1965)	3 September 2016	24 May 2018	1 year, 263 days	
8	Artak Davtyan	Lieutenant general Artak Davtyan (born 1970)	24 May 2018	8 June 2020	2 years, 15 days	
9	Onik Gasparyan	Colonel general Onik Gasparyan (born 1970)	8 June 2020	10 March 2021	275 days	
–	Stepan Galstyan	Lieutenant general Stepan Galstyan (born 1963); Acting	10 March 2021	22 March 2021	12 days	
(8)	Artak Davtyan	Lieutenant general Artak Davtyan (born 1970)	22 March 2021	24 February 2022	339 days	
10	Edvard Asryan	Lieutenant General; Edvard Asryan	14 July 2022		4 years, 91 days	

== See also ==
- Armenian Armed Forces
- Ministry of Defence of Armenia
- Armenian Army
- Armenian Air Force
