= Hayk Chobanyan =

Armenian politician (born 1973)

- Հայկ Չոբանյան
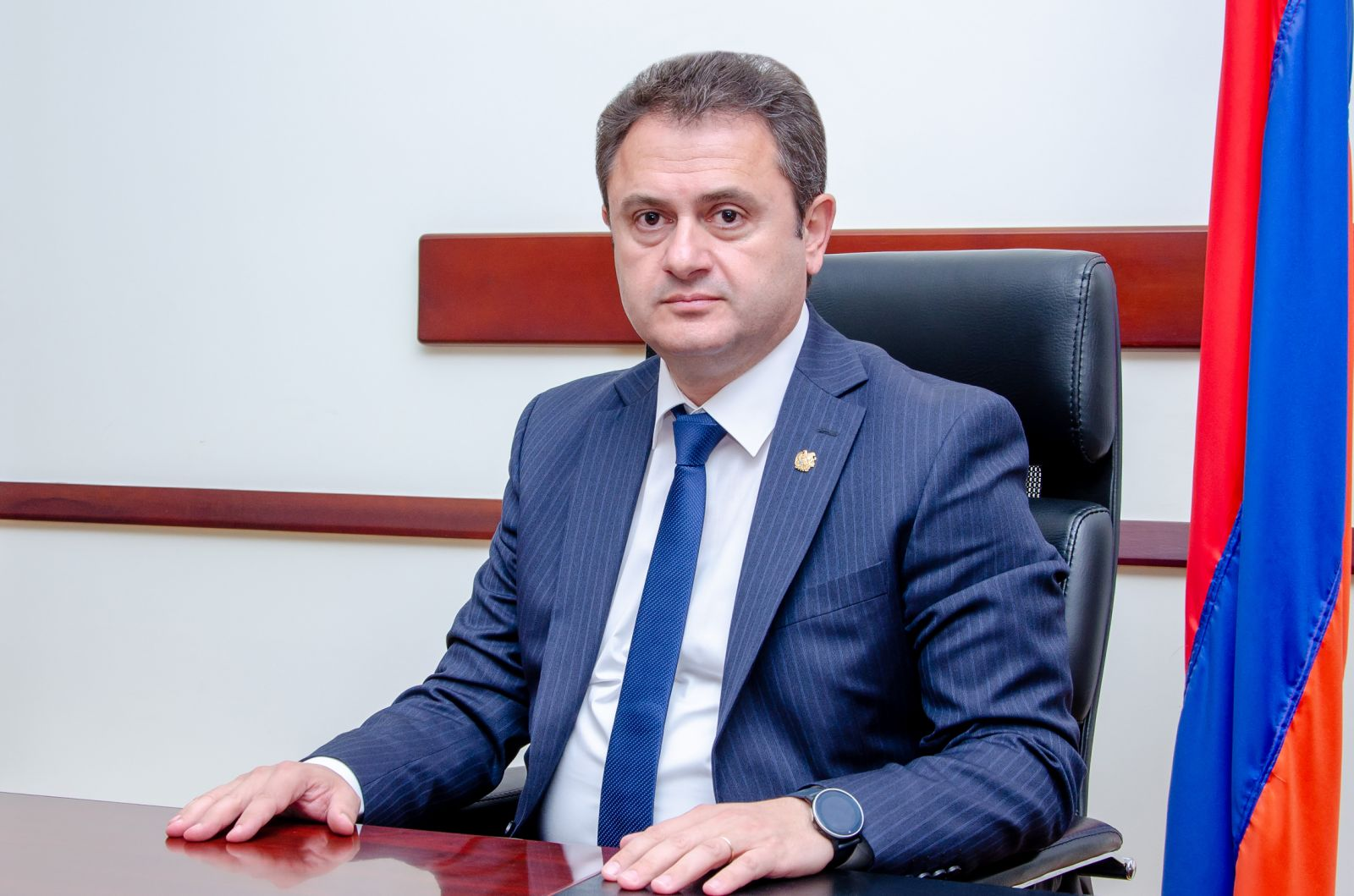
- Chobanyan in 2019

Governor of Tavush Region
- In office February 6, 2019 – April 1, 2021
- President: Armen Sarkissian
- Prime Minister: Nikol Pashinyan

Minister of High-Tech Industry
- In office April 2, 2021 – August 4, 2021
- Succeeded by: Vahagn Khachaturyan

Personal details
- Born: March 5, 1973 (age 53) Tavush, Shamshadin, Armenian SSR, USSR
- Spouse: Armine Tumanyan
- Education: Faculty of History of Yerevan State University; Public Administration Academy of Armenia

Hayk Harutyuni Chobanyan (Armenian: Հայկ Հարությունի Չոբանյան; born March 5, 1973) is an Armenian businessman and former politician. He served as the governor of Tavush Province from 2019 to 2021, then served as the Minister of High-Tech Industry from April to August 2021.

== Biography ==
Chobanyan was born in 1973 in the village Tavush of Tavush Region. He graduated from the local secondary school. From 1990 to 1995 Chobanyan studied at the History Department of Yerevan State University, where he was the first president of YSU Student Council. From 1995 to 1999 he studied at the Public Administration Academy of the Republic of Armenia. From 1995 to 1997 he served in the Armenian Army.

From 1997 to 1998 Chobanyan worked in the editorial staff of the "Civil Servant Newsletter" magazine, from 1998 to 2001 he worked in the government, then in the Ministry of Justice. From 2001 to 2003 he worked as Publishing Director, from 2003 to 2012 as the Director of Nork Information and Analytical Center at the Ministry of Labor and Social Affairs of the Republic of Armenia. From 2006 to 2013 Chobanyan was Board Member of the Union of Information Technology Enterprises. In 2012 he founded Arpi Solar Company, and in the same year headed Tavush Spiritual Revival Foundation. From 2014 to 2017 he worked as a Deputy Director of the Union of Information Technology Enterprises and Director of UITE EXPO. In 2016, he founded the Sustainable Energy Development Fund, and in 2018, Freenergy Company. Since 2016 he has been the Chairman of the Board of Trustees of the “Real School” Foundation, and since 2017 the Chairman of the Armenian Festival Association.

On February 6, 2019, Chobanyan was appointed Governor of Tavush Marz by the decision of the Government of the Republic of Armenia.

On April 2, 2021, by the decree of the President of the Republic of Armenia, Chobanyan was appointed Minister of High-Tech Industry of the Republic of Armenia.

== Awards ==
- YSU Silver Commemorative Medal (2009)
- Medal of Marshal Baghramyan (2019)
- Gold Medal of the Ministry of Labor and Social Affairs

== Family ==
He is married to artist Armine Tumanyan. They have two children: a daughter and a son.
