= Kentron TV =

- Country: Armenia
- Broadcast area: Europe, MENA
- Headquarters: Yerevan

Programming
- Picture format: 1080i SDTV

Ownership
- Owner: Multimedia Kentron PBY

History
- Launched: 2002

Links
- Website: kentron.tv

Kentron TV (Armenian: Կենտրոն հեռուստատեսություն) is a private television broadcasting company in Armenia.

== Programming ==
- If Only
- Dangerous Games
- Honest Сonversation with Mher
- Amerikyan Patmutyun

== See also ==
- Television in Armenia
