= Adequate Party =

Adequate Party Ադեկվադ
- Leader: Artur Danielyan
- Founded: September 7, 2019
- Headquarters: Yerevan, Armenia
- Ideology: Armenian nationalism Conservatism; Russophilia; Euroscepticism; Anti-globalism; Anti-capitalism
- Political position: Far-right

Website
- https://adekvad.am/en/

The Adequate Party (Armenian: Ադեկվադ, romanized: Adekvad) is an Armenian far-right political party.

== History ==
The party was established on 7 September 2019. While the party has not directly participated in any elections, the party opposed Prime Minister Nikol Pashinyan's victory following the 2018 Armenian parliamentary election. One of the leading members of the group, Artur Danielyan, used to be an ally of Pashinyan and a strategist for the prime minister’s Civil Contract party. Danielyan stated that he left the party over philosophical differences with Pashinyan. The party currently acts as an extra-parliamentary force.

== Ideology ==
The party has portrayed Nikol Pashinyan's government as a threat to Armenian identity and values. The party is Anti-globalist, Anti-Western and Anti-Liberal, opposes same-sex marriage, LGBT rights and uncontrolled immigration, and is against any Open Society Foundation activities in the country. Artur Danielyan believes businessman George Soros has supported Nikol Pashinyan since becoming prime minister. The party has identified itself as an alternative political force, and has compared it to the Alternative for Germany party.

Despite the party's social conservative stances, the party is known to favour certain big tent, syncretic and left-wing policies, mainly in regards to economics, health care, and education. The party supports a planned economy and economic protectionism, while opposing extreme capitalism. The party believes that quality health care and education should be universally accessible to all Armenian citizens.

In terms of foreign policy, Danielyan has called for closer relations with Russia, Iran, and European nation states (outside the EU structure). The party is staunchly Euroskeptic and has stated that Adequate would be open to joining a Pan-European right-wing alliance. Danielyan has stated, "We will ensure that European nations can cut the leash that the US has imposed on them right after the Second World War. European nations must build a lasting alliance with Russia." Meanwhile, the Atlantic Council has accused the party of conspiring with Russia and being directly controlled by Russian foreign agents.

In addition, the party advocates for increasing the birth-rate, supporting the activities of the Armenian Apostolic Church, and believes that the government should be fiscally responsible by controlling profits in the alcohol, tobacco and the gaming industry markets.

== Activities ==
In June 2019, Yerevan police arrested Artur Danielyan for threatening physical violence against Prime Minister Nikol Pashinyan.

On 1 May 2020, Danielyan was engaged in a physical altercation with the Deputy Speaker of the National Assembly, Alen Simonyan, after Danielyan verbally insulted Simonyan with sexual and homophobic slurs.

In June 2020, the party organized a rally in front of the US embassy in Yerevan, protesting against American interference in Armenia's domestic affairs. 20 members had been arrested due to civil disobedience. In July 2020, Artur Danielyan was subsequently charged with hooliganism.

On 15 November 2020, Danielyan, as well as, several party members were arrested by police due to a planned assault on Nikol Pashinyan.

Following the 2021 Armenian political crisis, Danielyan was summoned by the National Security Service for questioning in an alleged involvement of an assassination attempt on Pashinyan, organized by several members of the Homeland Salvation Movement. Danielyan was later released from custody by the court.

== See also ==
- Programs of political parties in Armenia
