= 2021 Armenian political crisis =

Alleged military coup d'état attempt in Armenia

2021 Armenian coup d'état attempt
- Part of 2020–2021 Armenian protests
Date	25 February 2021 – 28 March 2021
Location	Armenia
Result	Chief of the General Staff Onik Gasparyan dismissed and replaced with Artak Davtyan.; Snap election for June 20 called after an agreement between My Step Alliance, Bright Armenia and Prosperous Armenia.; Prime Minister Nikol Pashinyan to resign in April while continuing as interim prime minister.

Belligerents
General Staff of the Armenian Armed Forces; Political support: Homeland Salvation Movement: Prosperous Armenia; Republican Party; ARF; Homeland Party; NDU; Adequate Party	Self-declared non-involvement: President; National Security Service; Police; Prosecutor General's Office; Bright Armenia	Pashinyan government Supported by: Security Council; Ministry of Defense; Political support: My Step Alliance

Commanders and leaders
Onik Gasparyan (Chief of the General Staff); Serzh Sargsyan (alleged by Pashinyan)	Armen Sargsyan (President); Armen Abazyan (Director of the NSS); Vahe Ghazaryan (Chief of Police); Artur Davtyan (Prosecutor General)	Nikol Pashinyan (Prime Minister); Vagharshak Harutiunyan (Defense Minister)

Strength
March 1: 5,000—40,000 (claimed)	N/A	March 1: 20,000—60,000 (claimed)

The 2021 Armenian political crisis was an alleged military coup attempt by the Armed Forces of Armenia led by the Chief of the General Staff of the Armenian Armed Forces Onik Gasparyan against the government of Armenian Prime Minister Nikol Pashinyan. Pashinyan accused Gasparyan and 40 other high-ranking military officers of attempting a coup after they published a statement calling for Pashinyan's resignation on 25 February 2021.

== Background ==
Anti-government protests calling for the resignation of Prime Minister Nikol Pashinyan have been ongoing in Armenia since the country's defeat in the Second Nagorno-Karabakh War.

On 23 February 2021, Pashinyan gave an interview where, in response to claims made by former president Serzh Sargsyan, he cast doubt on the effectiveness of Armenia's Russian-supplied 9K720 Iskander missiles, implying that they were ineffective when used during the war against Azerbaijan. The next day, first deputy chief of the General Staff Tiran Khachatryan gave an interview where he reportedly laughed derisively at Pashinyan's claim about the missiles' effectiveness; Khachatryan was dismissed from his post hours later.

== Alleged coup attempt ==
On 25 February 2021, Armenian Chief of the General Staff of the Armenian Armed Forces Onik Gasparyan said in a statement signed by 40 top officers that Pashinyan and the government "are no longer able to make proper decisions in this fateful moment of crisis for the Armenian people", adding that their demand was triggered by Pashinyan's dismissal of the first deputy chief of the General Staff Tiran Khachatryan a day earlier.

Pashinyan responded to the statement by calling it an attempted military coup and called on his allies to gather in the capital Yerevan’s main Republic Square. Pashinyan also signed an order dismissing Onik Gasparyan from his post. While Pashinyan rallied his supporters in Republic Square, the opposition coalition called the Homeland Salvation movement held a parallel rally in Freedom Square in support of the generals' declaration. During his speech to his supporters, Pashinyan again suggested snap elections as the solution to the political crisis but stated that he would only resign at the demand of the Armenian people.

Protesters led by the Homeland Salvation Movement barricaded streets around parliament overnight and set up tents to add pressure on the government to step aside. Another protest was called for at 13:00 the next day.

Two days later Armenian President Armen Sarksyan refused the order from Prime Minister Nikol Pashinyan to dismiss Onik Gasparyan, saying parts of the decree were in violation of the constitution. Pashinyan immediately resent the motion to dismiss Gasparyan to the president. On 27 February, more than 15,000 protested in the capital Yerevan calling for Pashinyan to resign.

On 1 March, Pashinyan and the opposition again held rival rallies. Pashinyan accused Onik Gasparyan of treason and alleged that he issued the statement calling for Pashinyan's resignation at the suggestion of former president Serzh Sargsyan.

On 2 March, President Armen Sarksyan declared his decision once again not to sign the motion to dismiss Gasparyan and to make a separate appeal to the Constitutional Court of Armenia regarding the decision. However, as he did not send the motion itself to the Constitutional Court for review, Gasparyan's dismissal is to come into effect by force of law. In accordance with the Armenian Constitution, Gasparyan is supposed to be relieved from his post on 4 March, although the General Staff announced that Gasparyan will stay in his role for eight days after the president makes his appeal to the Constitutional Court. On 5 March, Andranik Kocharyan, the chairman of the Armenian parliament committee on defense and security, stated that Gasparyan's responsibilities are being fulfilled by Defense Minister Vagharshak Harutiunyan.

On 28 March Prime Minister Nikol Pashinyan announced he would resign in April, stating that his resignation was in order to hold snap elections in June.

== Reactions ==
=== Domestic ===
Both pro-government and opposition rallies were held in the capital Yerevan on 25 February. On 1 March, protesters stormed a government building in Yerevan to demand Nikol Pashinyan's resignation. The leader of the second largest opposition faction in parliament, Edmon Marukyan, suggested an agreement between the government and the parliamentary opposition by which the government would initiate snap elections but stop attempts to dismiss Onik Gasparyan from his post.

=== International ===
- Russia: Kremlin spokesman Dmitry Peskov said that Moscow was following the events in Armenia with concern, called on the sides to calm down and show restraint. Adding that the military's demand for the prime minister's resignation, is Armenia's internal affair.
- Turkey: Turkish Foreign Minister Mevlüt Çavuşoğlu strongly condemned the alleged coup attempt, saying it was unacceptable that the military had called for the resignation of a democratically elected leader.
- Azerbaijan: President of Azerbaijan Ilham Aliyev stated "Armenia has never been in such a bad and miserable situation. The administrators in Armenia are responsible for this situation".
- Artsakh: President of the Republic of Artsakh Arayik Harutyunyan expressed his extreme concern about the "recent internal political developments in the Republic of Armenia" and warned that the defeat of the Armenian side in the recent war could become "even deeper and fatal" if all sides did not show restraint. He offered his services as a mediator. General Vitaly Balasanyan, Secretary of the Artsakh Security Council, expressed his support for Gasparyan and the army. Justice, ARF and the Democratic Party of Artsakh declared their support for the General Staff.
- Sweden: Swedish Foreign Minister Ann Linde has expressed concern over the latest developments in Armenia, stating that "The situation must be resolved without violence".
- United States: The United States urged "all parties to exercise calm and restraint and to de-escalate tensions peacefully." The United States Department of State warned the Armenian military not to involve itself in politics.
- (European Union) PACE: The co-rapporteurs of the Parliamentary Assembly of the Council of Europe for the monitoring of Armenia found the statement issued on February 25 by the office of the General Staff "to be unacceptable", calling "upon all political forces and state actors to fully respect democratic principles and the Constitution of Armenia, and to take all necessary steps to immediately de-escalate the current situation".
