= Alvard Petrossyan =

Armenian politician (1946–2022)

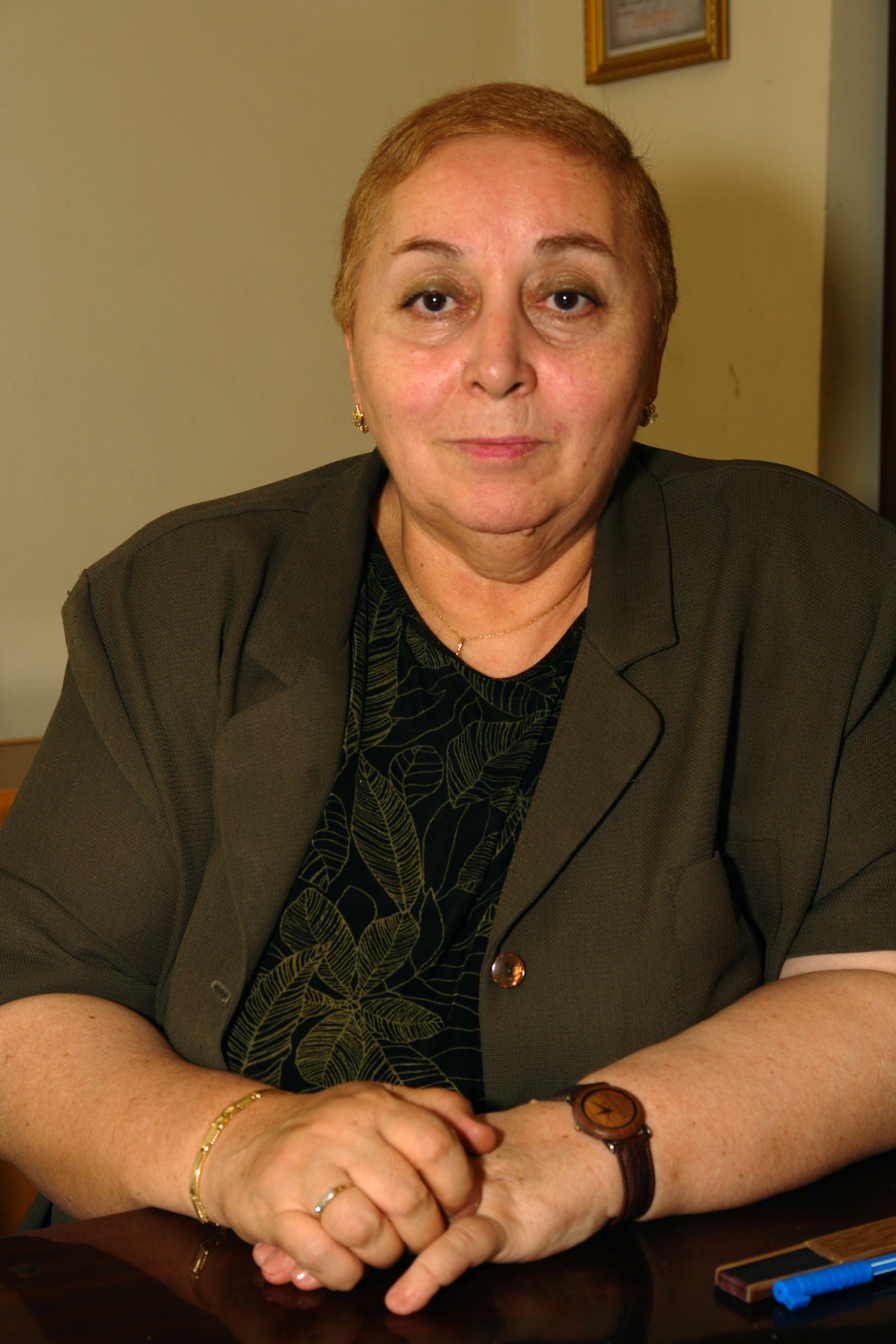
- Native name: Ալվարդ Պետրոսյան
- Born: 4 October 1946; Yerevan, Armenian SSR, USSR
- Died: 10 March 2022 (aged 75); Yerevan, Armenia
- Occupation: Writer, philologist, publicist

Alvard Petrossyan (Armenian: Ալվարդ Պետրոսյան, 4 October 1946 – 10 March 2022) was an Armenian writer, philologist, politician and publicist.

== Biography ==
Petrossyan was born in Yerevan on 4 October 1946. She studied at the Yerevan N 21 School under Alexander Shirvanzade, and in 1968 she graduated from the Faculty of Philology at Yerevan State University. From 1969 to 1975, Alvard Petrossyan worked at the State Television and Radio Committee of Armenia as an editor, 1975–1979, on Hayastani Ashkhatavorouhi magazine; in 1980–1981 she worked at the Armenian Diaspora Committee, and in 1982–1990 she was the assistant of chief editor of the first Soviet Literature (Nork) literary and art magazine. From 1990 to 1994 she was the chief editor of Aragast weekly. From 1994 to 1998 she was the head of the Armenian Regional Department of the Armenian Aid Union. From 1998 she was a member of the Armenian Relief Society central board.

Petrossyan died on 10 March 2022, at the age of 75.

== Political activity ==
During the terms 1999–2003, 2003–2007, 2007–2012 Alvard Petrossyan was a deputy in the National Assembly (proportional system, Armenian Revolutionary Federation). During the first two terms, she was on the NA Standing Committee on Social, Health Care and Environmental Protection Affairs being a member of the "Armenian Revolutionary Federation" Faction, during 2007–2012 she was on the NA Standing Committee on Human Rights and Public Affairs.

== Awards ==
- Medal of Marshal Baghramyan, 1997
- Honored Worker of Culture of Armenia, 2007
- Order of Merit, 2011
- Literary Awards
