= The Bride from Vegas =

- Film poster
- Directed by: Artur Levonovich Babayan
- Screenplay by: Armine Avetikian
- Produced by: Edmond Grigoryan
- Starring: Mikael Sharafyan; Charlene Rose; Sally Kirkland; Levon Sharafyan; Alla Tumanyan; Thomas La Barbera Christensen; Ani Tumanyan; Vardan Amolikyan; Peggy Riddle
- Cinematography: Troy Minassian
- Distributed by: Premium Mark Films
- Release date: September 25, 2014
- Running time: 86 minutes
- Country: United States
- Language: English
- Budget: $100 thousand
- Box office: $1 million

The Bride from Vegas is a 2014 American romantic adventure comedy film. It takes place in rural Armenia as well as Los Angeles and Las Vegas. It was filmed entirely in and around Los Angeles except for one weekend of filming in Las Vegas.

It stands as the debut work for its director, screenwriter, producer and most of the cast, with the notable exception of Sally Kirkland.

== Plot ==
The Bride from Vegas opens with what seems a completely different film. It looks like a low-budget Chinese action film. This turns out to be a film set, and the star of the non-existent film, Allison (Charlene Rose) gets fired.

Mike (Mikael Sharafyan) is a young man living a simple life in rural Armenia with his parents. When his street-wise cousin shows him a photo of Las Vegas showgirls, Mike falls in love with one of them and decides to travel to America, find the girl in the photo and marry her. To raise the money he needs, he sells his pet cow. This is only after a decidedly one-sided conversation with the cow.

Note – as long as Mike is in Armenia, all actors speak Armenian and English subtitles are shown.

His flight to Las Vegas is interrupted through a mishap, and he lands in Los Angeles. His travel across the desert is mostly filled with random characters, each building his idea of America.

Once in Las Vegas, Mike runs into Allison and the search for the showgirl begins. At this point the romance truly starts and the film follows a standard "rom-com" structure.

== Production ==
The film was filmed over a month with San Bernardino Valley, California standing in for Armenia, a warehouse near Van Nuys Airport serving as the opening scene, multiple restaurants in Glendale, California, and the jail/police station set in Anaheim, California. One weekend of shooting took place in Las Vegas, Nevada on the Las Vegas Strip, as well as one day at the Hoover Dam. In some cases, the homes of the actors were used as those character's homes.

== Reception ==
The film won an Audience Choice award at the 2015 Pomegranate Film Festival The cast and crew were interviewed on Armenian television in 2014

The film was released June 2014 in several theaters across Yerevan in Armenia. It played throughout the summer.

== Post-theatrical release ==
In February 2017, the film was released by Premium Mark Films on Amazon

== See also ==
- List of films set in Las Vegas
