= If Only (TV series) =

Armenian Romantic TV series

- Also known as: Blessed
- Yerani
- Genre: Melodrama drama; Romance
- Starring: Ben Avetisyan; Shushanna Tovmasyan; Eteri Voskanyan; Sofi Devoyan; Adriana Galstyan
- Country of origin: Armenia
- Original language: Armenian
- No. of seasons: 1
- No. of episodes: 81

Production
- Production locations: Yerevan, Armenia; Other places of Armenia
- Running time: 40-45 minutes

Original release
- Network: Kentron TV
- Release: January 6, 2016

Related
- Dangerous Games (Armenian TV series)

If Only or Blessed (Armenian: Երանի Yerani) is an Armenian romantic melodrama television series. The series premiered on Kentron TV on January 6, 2016. The series takes place in Yerevan, Armenia.

== Cast and characters ==
- Ben Avetisyan as Aram
- Shushanna Tovmasyan as Ani
- Sofi Devoyan as Sophie
- Eteri Voskanyan as Lilith
- Adriana Galstyan as Martha
- Garik Chepchyan
- Gohar Igityan
- Alina Martirosyan
- Harutyun Movsisyan
- Vruyr Harutyunyan
- Irina Ayvazyan as Lisa
