= Hayk Grigoryan =

Armenian lawyer

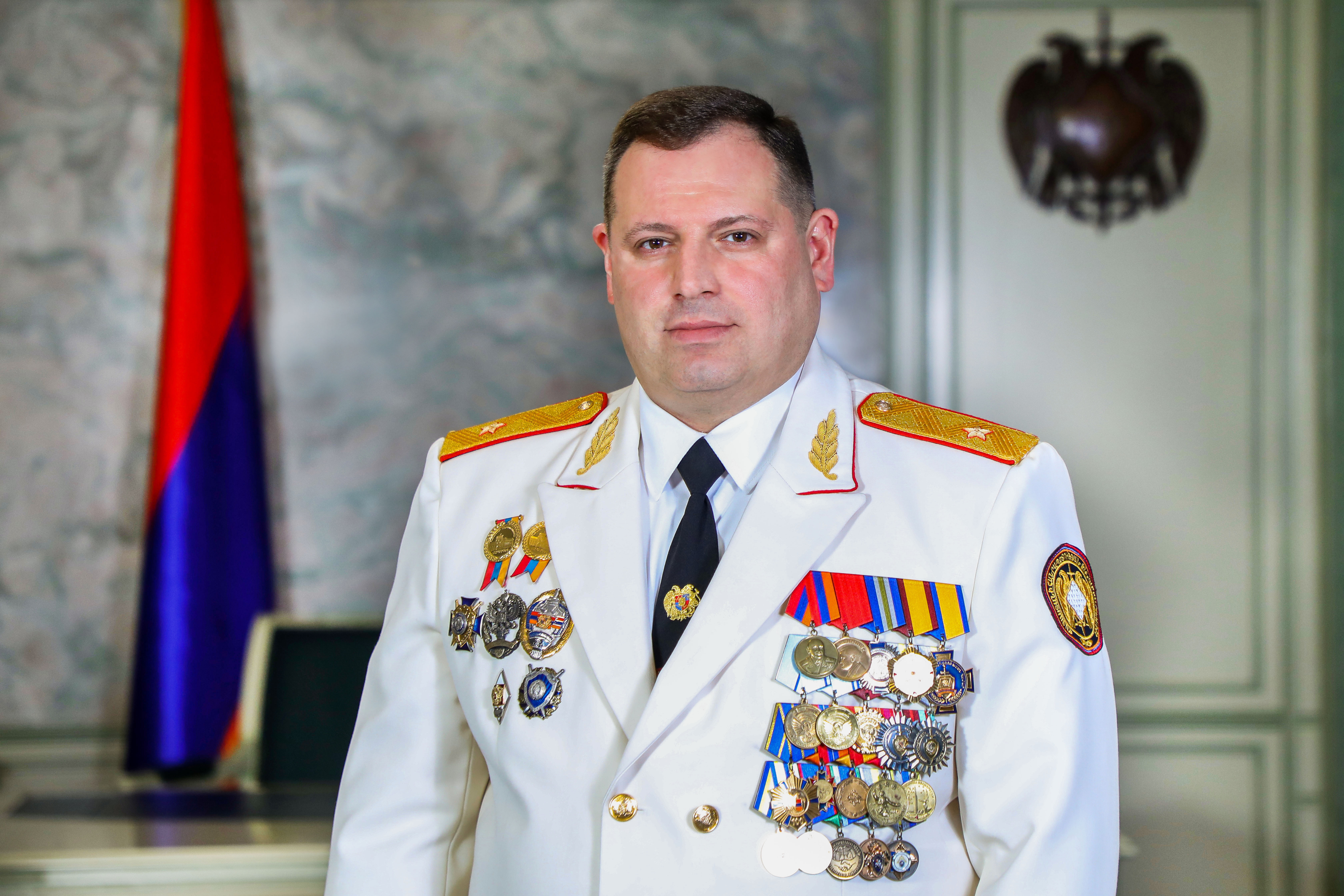

Chairman of the Investigative Committee of Armenia
- In office July 10, 2018 – July 12, 2021
- President: Armen Sarkissian
- Prime Minister: Nikol Pashinyan
- Succeeded by: Argishti Kyaramyan

Personal details
- Born: September 15, 1976 (age 50) Yerevan, Armenian SSR, USSR
- Education: Military University of the Ministry of Defense of the Russian Federation
- Profession: Lawyer

Military service
- Branch/service: Armed Forces of Armenia
- Years of service: 1994-1996
- Rank: Third Class State Counselor of Justice

Hayk Mkrtichi Grigoryan (Armenian: Հայկ Մկրտիչի Գրիգորյան; born September 15, 1976) is an Armenian jurist currently serving as a member of the Supreme Judicial Council of Armenia. He served as the Chairman of the Investigative Committee of Armenia from July 2018 to July 2021.

== Biography ==
Hayk Grigoryan was born on 15 September 1976 in Yerevan in what was the former Soviet Union. In 1993, he graduated from a secondary school in Yerevan. From 1994-1996, he served in Armenian Army. In 1997, Grigoryan was admitted to the Prosecutorial and Investigative Division of the Special Faculty of the Military University of the Russian Ministry of Defense. In August 2001, by decree of the Prosecutor General of Armenia, he was appointed to the Military Prosecutor's Office of the 3rd Garrison, to a position of Investigator-Trainee. In 2006, he was admitted to the Postgraduate School of the Russian Ministry of Defense. In 2009 he graduated from the school and defended the thesis for PhD degree titled "Investigation of crimes committed by military personnel of the Armenian Military Forces during the armed conflicts". In December 2011, the Defense Minister appointed him to the Investigative Service of the Ministry of Defense. On 14 January 2015, he was appointed to the position of the Deputy Chairman of the Investigative Committee and Head of the General Military Investigative Department. In July 2018, he was appointed Chairman of the Investigative Committee of the Republic of Armenia. He held this position until July 12, 2021. He was appointed to the Supreme Judicial Council of Armenia on December 6, 2022.

Hayk Grigoryan is the author of 48 scholarly articles and works. In 2019, he received the rank of Third Class State Councilor of Justice. He received the degree of Doctor of Sciences in Jurisprudence in 2021. He is fluent in the Armenian and Russian languages.

== Honors ==
=== Ranks ===
- Lieutenant (2001)
- Third Class Lawyer (2002)
- Second Class Lawyer (2004)
- First Class Lawyer (2006)
- Senior Lieutenant (2006)
- Captain (2009)
- Major (2010)
- Lieutenant Colonel (2013)
- Lieutenant Colonel of Justice (2014)
- Colonel of Justice (2015)
- First Class Councilor of Justice (2018)
- Third Class State Councilor of Justice (2019)

=== Awards ===
- Medal of the Prime Minister of Armenia (twice)
- Medal of the Supreme "Distinguished Investigator" medal
- Medal of the Supreme "Distinguished Investigator" medal (Artsakh)
- Medal "For Strengthening of Cooperation" (Artsakh)
- Medal "For Strengthening of Cooperation"
- Medal of Marshal Baghramyan
- Medal "For Unimpeachable Service" (first and second degree)
- Medal of Vazgen Sargsyan
- Medal "20 Years Armenian Armed Forces"
- Medal "NKR Defense Army" (Artsakh)
- Medal "90 Years of Military University"
- Medal "Dedication and Velour"
- Medal "For Honorable Service" (Artsakh)
- Medal "Mother’s Gratitude"
- Medal "For Strengthening of the Legal Order of the Republic of Armenia"
- Jubilee Medal "100 Years of Security Services"
- Jubilee Badge "100 Years of Prosecutor’s Office"
- Medal "For Strengthening of International Cooperation"
- Medal "75 years of Liberating of Republic of Belarus from German Fascist Conquerors"
- Medal "For Service and Collaboration"
- Medal "For Combat Cooperation"
- Medal "Bulwark of Law"
- Medal "For Merit" (Russia)
- Medal "For Merit" (Belarus)
