= 366th Guards Motor Rifle Regiment =

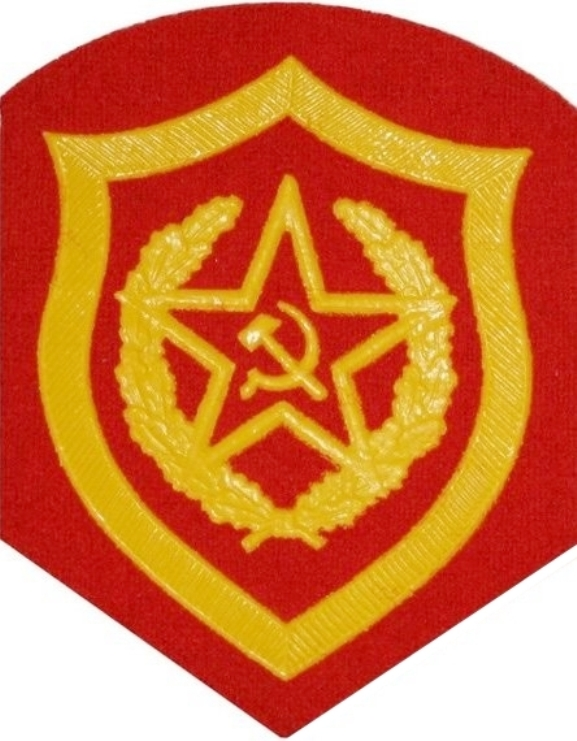
- 366th Guards Motor Rifle Regiment
- Active: 1964–1992
- Country: Soviet Union
- Allegiance: CIS
- Branch: Infantry
- Size: Regiment
- Part of: 23rd Guards Motor Rifle Division
- Garrison/HQ: Stepanakert
- Engagements: Operation Ring
- Decorations: Order of Suvorov
- Battle honours: Mazyr

The 366th Guards Motor Rifle Regiment was a motor rifle unit of the Soviet Army and the United Armed Forces of the Commonwealth of Independent States.

== Lineage ==
- 3rd Turkestan Cavalry Division
- 8th Cavalry Corps
- 14th Guards Cavalry Division, 7th Guards Cavalry Corps
- 98th Guards Mechanized Regiment
- 366th Guards Motor Rifle Regiment

== Cold War ==
On 17 November 1964, the new name of the 98th Guards Mechanized Regiment became 366th Guards Motorized Rifle Mozyr Red Banner Order of Suvorov Regiment. In 1985, the regiment was relocated from Şəmkir to Stepanakert, the administrative center of the Nagorno-Karabakh Autonomous Oblast (NKAO). The military townlet of the regiment was located in the upper part of the city near the road connecting it with the city of Shusha.

Before the redeployment of the regiment, which was equipped with vehicles such as BMPs, there were no large military units on the territory of the NKAO. The reasons for the redeployment was never revealed. According to many Azerbaijani sources, this happened as a result of secret negotiations between high-ranking Armenian nationalists with the leadership of the Transcaucasian Military District. In 1988, all units of the 23rd Guards Motor Rifle Division except the 366th Regiment were based at Kirovabad (now Ganja, Azerbaijan).

== Karabakh War and Khojaly massacre ==
In the second half of 1987, acute interethnic tensions arose in the NKAO. In February 1988, the crisis in the region intensified after the Sumgait pogrom. The personnel of the regiment to show signs of demoralization due to constant attacks on military personnel with the aim of seizing weapons, a lack of proper food supply, understaffing and pressure coming from the local population. The understaffing of the personnel made ensuring reliable protection of the regiment's facilities impossible. "Officers and soldiers didn’t receive money for months, they didn’t eat bread for weeks, they ate only crackers from the NZ (emergency reserve)". In such conditions, by the end of 1991, many officers of the regiment began receiving offers to participate in hostilities on a paid basis, on the side of the Armenian armed formations. On December 25, 1991, with the dissolution of the Soviet Union, the regiment formally became part of the CIS Joint Armed Forces. At this point, officers of the regiment had begun to offer assistance to the Armenian population, while the units based in Ganja sided with the Azeri population. A factor in this change in policy was the fact that 50 of the remaining 350 personnel of the regiment were Armenians, including the commander of the 2nd Battalion, Major Seyran Ohanyan. Of particular use to the Armenian Army was the regimental tank company's ten tanks.

Following an attack on the regiment on 23 February, the regiment took part in the mass murder of several hundreds of Azerbaijani civilians in the town of Khojaly on 26 February. Krasnaya Zvezda reported that personnel of the 366th took part in "military operations" in the town "despite categorical orders of the command of the military district" and that many in the regiment who were selectively searched had "large amounts of money on them, including foreign currency". Russian authorities to date deny the involvement of the regiment in the atrocities at Khojaly. Following the massacre, the leadership of the CIS Joint Armed Forces made the decision to evacuate the regiment from Stepanakert to Vaziani in the territory of Georgia. The withdrawal of the regiment began on March 1, accompanied by battles with Armenian volunteer formations. 10 days later, the regiment was disbanded in Vaziani.

== Commanders ==
- Colonel Alexander Kolyvanov (1988-1990)
- Lieutenant Colonel Yuri Zarvigorov (1990-1992)

== Sources ==
- Feskov, V.I.; Golikov, V.I.; Kalashnikov, K.A.; Slugin, S. A. (2013). Вооруженные силы СССР после Второй Мировой войны: от Красной Армии к Советской [The Armed Forces of the USSR after World War II: From the Red Army to the Soviet: Part 1 Land Forces] (in Russian). Tomsk: Scientific and Technical Literature Publishing. ISBN 9785895035306.
