= Saqiyan =

Saqiyan Սաղիան • Saghian
- Municipality
- Location within Azerbaijan
- Coordinates: 40°38′N 48°30′E
- Country: Azerbaijan
- District: Shamakhi

Population
  - Total: 544
- Time zone: UTC+4 (AZT)

Saqiyan (Sagiyan; Armenian: Սաղիան, romanized: Saghian) is a village and municipality in the Shamakhi District of Azerbaijan. It has a population of 544 and was one of the oldest Armenian-populated villages of the Shamakhi district.

== History ==
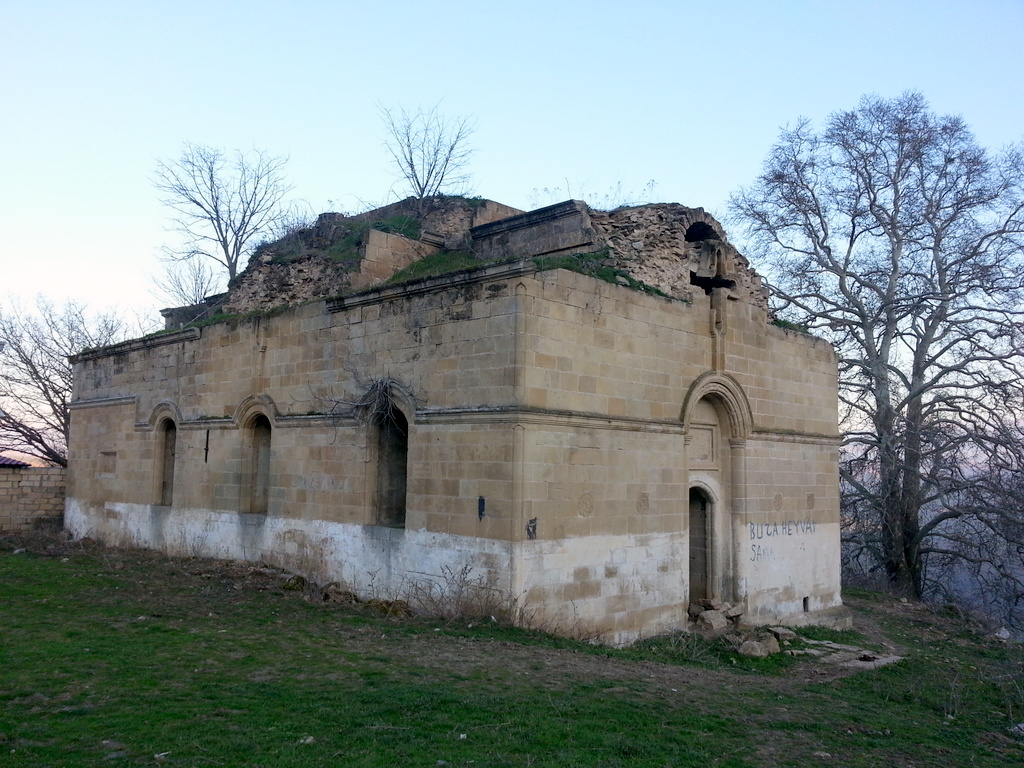
Ruins of St. Stephen Protomartyr episcopal monastery

The name Saghian was first mentioned in 1636. At the north-western end of the village, the famous and valuable monument of the village, the episcopal monastery of St. Stephen Protomartyr is preserved. The monastery was built in 1660 and for hundreds of years it was the seat of the leader of the Shamakhi diocese.

According to 1914 statistics, the village had a population of 1207 people, all of them Armenians. Until 1970, the village was exclusively inhabited by Armenians. The last Armenians left the village during the 1988 deportation.
