= Alla Tumanian =

Armenian-American actress (born 1950)

- Born: March 17, 1950 (age 75); Yerevan, Armenian SSR, Soviet Union
- Citizenship: Armenia, United States
- Occupation: actress
- Years active: 1972-present

Alla Tumanian (also Tumanyan; Armenian: Ալլա Թումանյան; born March 17, 1950) is an Armenian-American theatre and film actress.

== Biography ==
Tumanian was born in 1950 in Yerevan, Soviet Union. In 1971, she graduated from the Yerevan State Institute of Theater and Fine Arts, the Faculty of acting. 1971-1990 she worked at Sundukyan State Academic Theatre of Yerevan, 1990–1991 at "Metro" theatre.

== Selected filmography ==
Year	Film	Role
1972	Men	Karine
1973	Winepress (Sour Grape)	Sanam
1973	Chaos	Shushanik
1973	The Cliff	Tereza
1975	Our Daily Water	Gohar
1978	Star of Hope	Gohar
1982	The Mechanics of Happiness	Sona
1983	The Barber Whose Uncle Had His Head Bitten off by a Circus Tiger	mother
1983	Halt	short
1985	An Apple Garden	Nunufar
1986	The Kite Day	in the episodes
1986	Strange Games	Nelli
1987	A Drugstore on the Crossroads	Anna
1988	Breath	Anahit
1989	Repeated Be All...	Sirarpi
1992	Where Were You, Man of God?	
2002	Alicia	Sister Mary
2015	Aram, Aram	Elena
2015	Tangerine	Ashken
2014	II Before I Die	Mother
2014	The Bride From Vegas	Mom
2012	The Innocent Sinners	Bella
2016	No One Ever Said	Older woman

=== TV Series ===
Year	Film	Role
2006	Cost of Life	
2009	Immigrants	Valeria
2010	Los	Satik
2012	American stories	
2015	Dangerous Games	
