= Tiran Khachatryan =

Armenian lieutenant general (born 1977)

National Hero of Armenia Tiran Khachatryan
- Native name: Տիրան Վազգենի Խաչատրյան
- Born: Tiran Vazgeni Khachatryan; July 20, 1977 (age 48); Proshyan, Armenian SSR, Soviet Union
- Allegiance: Armenian Armed Forces
- Service years: 1987–2021
- Rank: Lieutenant general
- Conflicts: First Nagorno-Karabakh War; Second Nagorno-Karabakh War
- Awards: National Hero of Armenia

Tiran Vazgeni Khachatryan (Armenian: Տիրան Վազգենի Խաչատրյան; born 1977) is an Armenian lieutenant general who formerly served as the First Deputy Chief of the General Staff of the Armed Forces of Armenia. During the 2020 Nagorno-Karabakh war, Khachatryan was conferred with the title of National Hero of Armenia.

== Life and career ==
Tiran Vazgenovich Khachatryan was born on 20 July 1977 in the Armenian SSR, part of the then Soviet Union.

In 1987, he joined the Proshyan Volunteer Detachment to take part in operations along the border villages of the Noyemberyan District in Armenia. During the First Nagorno-Karabakh War, from 1990 to 1991, he was a military signalman in the Armenian Armed Forces and provided communications with the border regions of the country, the breakaway Nagorno-Karabakh Republic and Yerevan. From 1991 to 1994, he fought in the ARF's Shushi Battalion.

On 4 September 2013, by the decree of the President of Armenia, he was appointed head of the Combat Training Department of the Armenian Armed Forces with the conclusion of a five-year contract.

On 15 June 2020, by the decree of the President of Armenia, he was appointed the First Deputy Chief of the General Staff of the Armenian Armed Forces. On February 24, 2021, Khachatryan was relieved of the post of First Deputy Chief of the General Staff of the Armed Forces. Khachatryan's dismissal on the order of Prime Minister Nikol Pashinyan was the stated reason for a declaration by more than 40 of Armenia's top military officers (including Khachatryan) calling for Pashinyan's resignation; Pashinyan condemned the declaration as a coup attempt.

On 4 January 2025, Khachatryan was arrested on charges of negligence relating to the 2020 Nagorno-Karabakh war.
