= Artak Davtyan (general) =

Armenian Lieutenant-General

- Արտակ Դավթյան
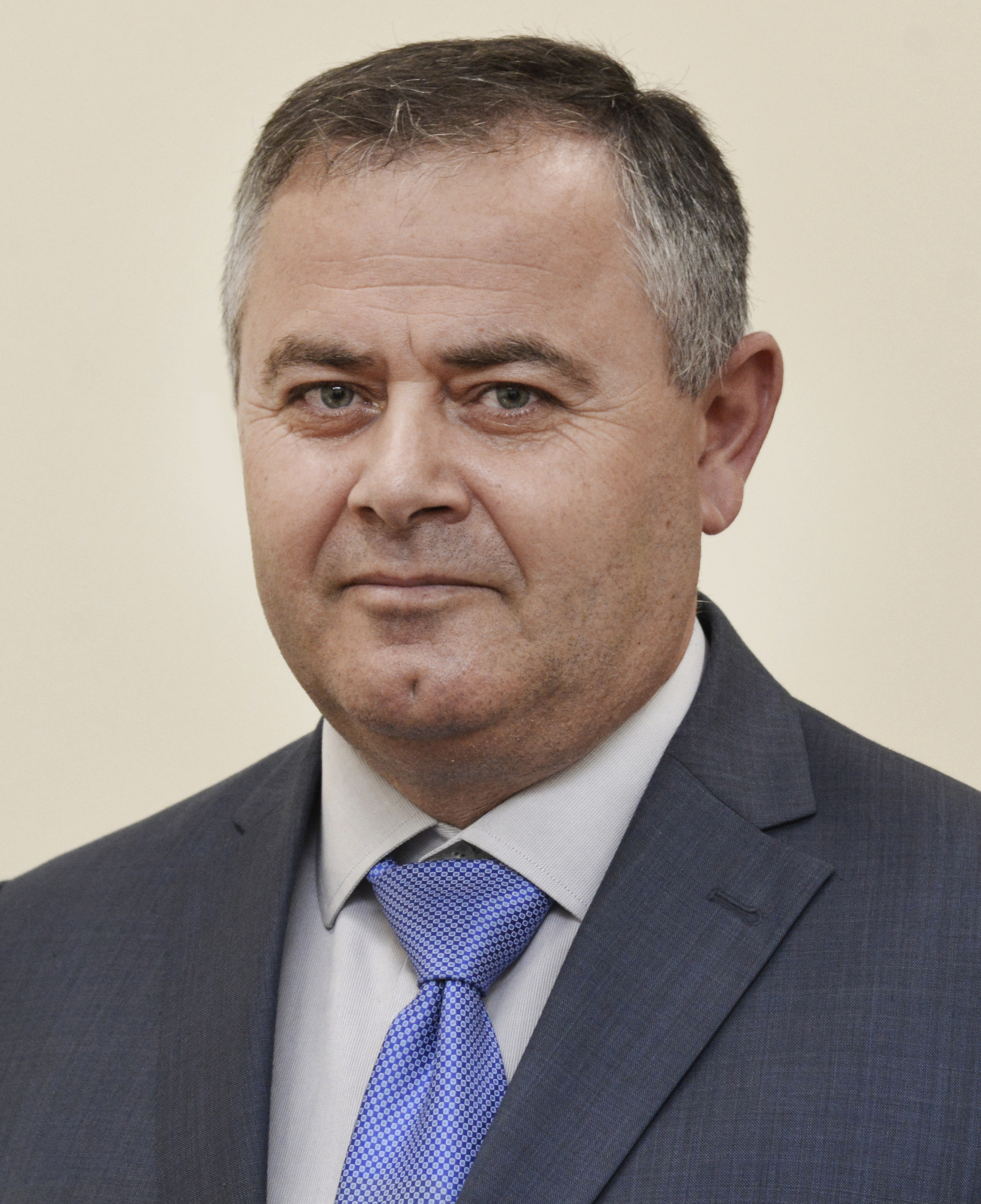

Chief of the General Staff of the Armenian Armed Forces
- In office March 22, 2021 – February 24, 2022
- President: Armen Sarkissian
- Prime Minister: Nikol Pashinyan
- Preceded by: Onik Gasparyan
- Succeeded by: Edvard Asryan
- In office May 24, 2018 – June 8, 2020
- President: Armen Sarkissian
- Prime Minister: Nikol Pashinyan
- Preceded by: Movses Hakobyan
- Succeeded by: Onik Gasparyan

Personal details
- Born: March 31, 1970 (age 56) Bambakashat, Armenian SSR, Soviet Union

Military service
- Allegiance: Armenia
- Branch/service: Armed Forces of Armenia
- Years of service: 1990–2022
- Rank: Lieutenant-General
- Battles/wars: First Nagorno-Karabakh War

Artak Matevosi Davtyan (Armenian: Արտակ Մաթևոսի Դավթյան; born March 31, 1970) is an Armenian Lieutenant General who served as the Chief of the General Staff of the Armenian Armed Forces from May 2018 to June 2020 and again from March 2021 to February 2022.

== Early life and military service ==
Artak Davtyan was born in 1970 in the village of Bambakashat, in the Hoktemberyan region (now located in Armavir province) of the Armenian Soviet Socialist Republic. He took part in the First Nagorno-Karabakh War from 1988 to 1992, quickly rising through the ranks of the newly formed Armenian Army. Starting in 1992, Davtyan began to serve as either the commander or deputy commander of various military units. During that same time, he was also enrolled in military academies in Russia.

In 2006, Davtyan began to work at the departments of the General Staff of the Armenian Armed Forces. On January 31, 2009, he was appointed head of the operative department and was relieved of his duties as Deputy Chief of the General Staff, a position he served in since 2007. On 29 September 2017, Davtyan was appointed commander of the 5th Army Corps of the Armenian Defense Ministry based in the Nubarashen District.

He served in the position of 5th Army Corps commander until he was recommended to the post of Chief of Staff by recently elected Prime Minister Nikol Pashinyan, who dismissed Lieutenant General Movses Hakobyan from the post on May 24, 2018. He officially took office later that day by presidential decree. He was dismissed from his post as Chief of the General Staff after hosting a wedding party for his son in violation of COVID-19 restrictions. Davtyan was then appointed Chairman of the Military Industry Committee of Armenia on 17 July 2020. On 16 November 2020, he was dismissed from that post following Armenia's defeat in the Second Nagorno-Karabakh War.

On 10 March 2021, Prime Minister Pashinyan again nominated Davtyan for the post of Chief of the General Staff following the controversial dismissal of Davtyan's successor Onik Gasparyan. Although President of Armenia Armen Sarksyan refused to approve Davtyan's appointment and the Administrative Court of Armenia ruled that Gasparyan should retain his post pending a final decision on the legality of his dismissal, Prime Minister Pashinyan announced that the appointment of Davtyan had gone into effect by force of law on 22 March 2021, as the President neither signed the order nor sent it to the country's Constitutional Court. The Premier introduced him to the General Staff on 22 March, stating that he had "kept in touch all this time" and that "It was obvious to me that we should re-engage him to benefit from his potential in managing our public affairs." Davtyan then declared that he is "confident that the Armed Forces will not take part in any political process not stipulated by the Constitution and laws."

In January 2022, it was revealed that Davtyan is one of the accused, along with former minister of defense David Tonoyan, arms dealer Davit Galstyan and a number of other high-ranking Armenian officers, in a criminal case related to the sale of non-functioning missiles to the Armenian Army.

Davtyan was dismissed from his position as Chief of the General Staff on February 24, 2022.

== Education ==
- Moscow Higher Military Command School (1990)
- Frunze Military Academy (1995–1998)
- Military Academy of the General Staff of the Armed Forces of Russia (2005–2006)

== Awards ==
- First Degree Medal for Services to Homeland
- Medal of Honor of the Republic of Armenia
- Vardan Mamikonyan Medal
