= Seyran Ohanyan =

Armenian politician and general

- Սեյրան Օհանյան
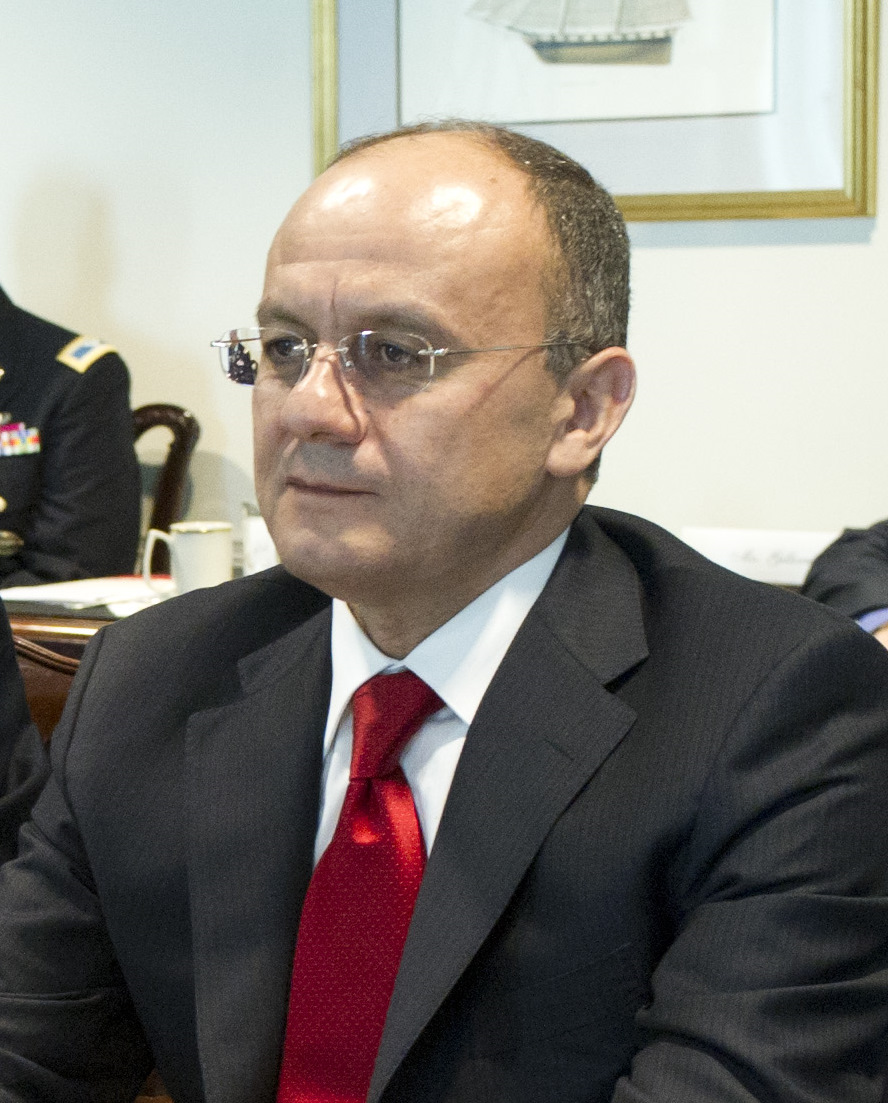
- Ohanyan in 2012

Minister of Defence of Armenia
- In office 14 April 2008 – 3 October 2016
- President: Serzh Sargsyan
- Deputy: David Tonoyan
- Preceded by: Mikael Harutyunyan
- Succeeded by: Vigen Sargsyan

Minister of Defence of Artsakh
- In office August 1999 – 11 May 2007
- President: Leonard Petrosyan; Arkadi Ghukasyan
- Preceded by: Samvel Babayan
- Succeeded by: Movses Hakobyan

Chief of the General Staff of the Armenian Armed Forces
- In office 11 May 2007 – 14 April 2008
- President: Robert Kocharyan; Serzh Sargsyan
- Preceded by: Mikael Harutyunyan
- Succeeded by: Yuri Khatchaturov
Parlimentary offices
Leader of the Armenia Alliance in the National Assembly
Incumbent
Assumed office 2 August 2021
Preceded by	Position established
Member of the National Assembly of Armenia
Incumbent
Assumed office 2 August 2021
Parliamentary group	Armenia Alliance
Constituency	District 078

Personal details
- Born: 1 July 1962 (age 64) Shushi, Nagorno-Karabakh Autonomous Oblast, USSR (now Shusha, Azerbaijan)
- Party: Independent
- Other political affiliations: Armenia Alliance
- Awards: see below

Military service
- Allegiance: USSR (Republic of Artsakh) Artsakh; Armenia
- Branch/service: Soviet Army; Artsakh Defense Army; Armenian Ground Forces
- Years of service: 1983–2008
- Rank: Colonel General
- Commands: Soviet 366th Motorized Rifle Regiment; Armenian 5th Army Corps
- Battles/wars: First Nagorno-Karabakh War; Four-Day War; Second Nagorno-Karabakh War

Seyran Musheghi Ohanyan (Armenian: Սեյրան Մուշեղի Օհանյան; born 1 July 1962) is an Armenian military officer and politician currently serving as a deputy in the National Assembly of Armenia. He served as Defence Minister of Armenia from 14 April 2008 until 3 October 2016, the longest official to serve in that position. A native of Nagorno-Karabakh, he participated in both the first and second Karabakh wars, and from 2000 to 2007 served as defence minister of the unrecognized Republic of Artsakh.

== Biography ==
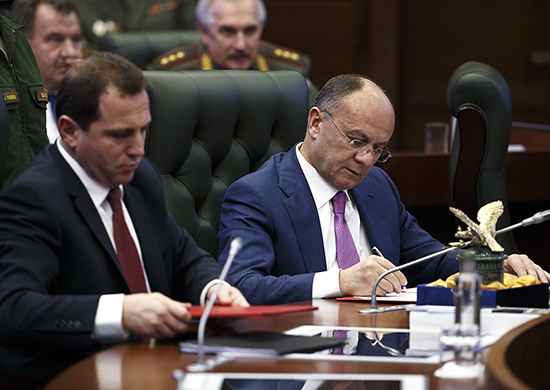
Ohanyan with David Tonoyan.

=== Early life ===
Ohanyan was born in the town of Shusha, then in the Nagorno-Karabakh Autonomous Oblast of the Azerbaijan SSR in the Soviet Union. In 1979, he completed high school in the village of Mrgashen, in the Nairi district of the Armenian SSR (now located in the Kotayk province of Armenia).

=== Soviet military career and Karabakh war ===
Ohanyan attended the Baku Higher Joint Command College and completed his studies there in 1983. He subsequently served with the Group of Soviet Forces in Germany, first as a platoon commander and from March 1987 as a company commander. In June 1988 he was transferred to the Transcaucasian Military District's 23rd Motor-Rifle Division based in Kirovabad, Azerbaijan and was appointed motor-rifle company commander of the 366th Motor Rifle Regiment based in Stepanakert; he became deputy battalion commander in August 1989 and 2nd battalion commander within the same regiment in September 1990.

After the fall of the Soviet Union, the 366th regiment was pulled out of Stepanakert in March 1992 and Ohanyan joined Nagorno-Karabakh's newly formed army, playing a major role in the First Nagorno-Karabakh war against Azerbaijan. In May 1992, Ohanyan participated in the capture of his hometown of Shushi, one of the most significant victories achieved by the Armenian side. He led a force of 400 men against the fortified town from the southwestern direction. He was seriously wounded in action near Chldran, Martakert district in September 1992, with his leg amputated as a result. Following treatment, Ohanyan rejoined the military.

=== Military career (1994–2007) ===
After the war, he served as deputy commander of the Nagorno-Karabakh Defence Army from 1994 to 1998, commander of Armenia's 5th Army Corps from 1998 to 1999 and Defence Minister of the Nagorno-Karabakh Republic from 1999 to 2007. Ohanyan was promoted to major general in 1995, lieutenant general in 2000 and colonel general in 2007.

In May 2007, Ohanyan was appointed Chief of the General Staff of the Armenian Armed Forces and First Deputy Minister of Defence of Armenia.

=== Defence minister ===
After Serzh Sargsyan took office as President of Armenia, he appointed Ohanyan as Minister of Defence on 14 April 2008. During Ohanyan's time as Defence Minister, Armenian forces fought with Azerbaijan in the Four-Day War of April 2016, which was the worst outbreak of violence in Nagorno-Karabakh after the 1994 ceasefire and before the 2020 Nagorno-Karabakh war. He was dismissed from his post in October 2016.

=== Opposition politician (2017) ===
In February 2017, Ohanyan formed a political coalition with opposition politicians Vartan Oskanian and Raffi Hovannisian and their respective political parties to participate in the 2017 Armenian parliamentary election. The "Ohanian-Raffi-Oskanian" alliance received 32,508 votes in the 2017 election, failing to reach the 5 percent threshold required to enter parliament.

In 2019 and 2020, Ohanyan was called several times to answer the questions of the Armenian parliament's investigative committee on the Four-Day War.

=== 2020 Nagorno-Karabakh war and aftermath ===
Ohanyan went to Nagorno-Karabakh to command Armenian forces after the start of the 2020 Nagorno-Karabakh War in September 2020. Although Armenian and Artsakh authorities reported that Ohanyan commanded Armenian forces during the four-day battle for Shusha (which ended in the capture of the town by Azerbaijani forces), Ohanyan himself later denied this, stating that he only led a detachment of 16 men during the battle. The Azerbaijani Army claimed that they had wounded Ohanyan during the battle, a claim which was denied by the spokesperson of the President of Artsakh. On 11 November, the Baku Military Court initiated a criminal case against him in absentia with the charge of "genocide". Azerbaijan's Ministry of Internal Affairs also put him on their international wanted list.

After the end of the war, Ohanyan joined a number of officials in calling for the resignation of Prime Minister Nikol Pashinyan, saying that "the independence of the Republic of Armenia, the inviolability of its borders, and the physical existence of the population are endangered" should he not leave.

=== 2021 Armenian parliamentary election ===
On 5 February 2021, Ohanyan announced his intention to participate in potential snap elections. He participated in the 2021 Armenian parliamentary election as a member of the Armenia Alliance, an electoral coalition led by ex-president Robert Kocharyan. Ohanyan currently leads the Armenia Alliance's parliamentary bloc in the National Assembly of Armenia.

== Legal issues ==
In January 2019, Ohanyan was charged with "overthrowing the constitutional order" in relation to the 2008 Armenian presidential election protests, when army and police forces suppressed mass protests against the election results, resulting in the deaths of 10 people. Ohanyan was serving as Chief of the General Staff at the time. He was tried along with former president Robert Kocharyan, general Yuri Khachaturov, and former security council secretary Armen Gevorgyan, although the trial was delayed in September 2020 due to Ohanyan's participation in the 2020 Nagorno-Karabakh war. The trial ended in March 2021 after the Constitutional Court of Armenia declared unconstitutional the article of the criminal code under which Ohanyan, Kocharyan, Khachaturov, and Gevorgyan were being tried.

In March 2020, he was charged with embezzlement of state funds during his tenure as defence minister. Ohanyan denies all charges.

In May 2021, Ohanyan was charged with embezzlement of property from the Dzoraget Hydroelectric Power Station. Ohanyan denies the charges.

== Personal life ==
Ohanyan is married to Ruzanna Khachatryan, an Armenian doctor, and has three sons and one daughter. His oldest son David is an officer in the Armenian Army. His other son Arthur was an officer in the Artsakh Defence Army and was wounded during the 2020 Nagorno-Karabakh war.

== Awards ==
Ohanyan has been awarded with the medals and decorations of the USSR, Armenia and Republic of Artsakh:

Armenia

- (Armenia) Order of the Combat Cross, 1st class
- (Armenia) Tigran Mets Order
- (Armenia) Drastamat Kanayan Medal
- (Armenia) Medal of Marshal Baghramyan
- (Armenia) Medal "For the Service to the Motherland"

Nagorno-Karabakh

- (Republic of Artsakh) Medal "For the liberation of Shushi"
- (Republic of Artsakh) Hero of Artsakh (September 1999)
- (Republic of Artsakh) Order of the Combat Cross, 1st class

Soviet Union

- (Soviet Union) Medal "For Distinction in Military Service"
- (Soviet Union) Medal "For Impeccable Service", 3rd class
- (Soviet Union) Jubilee Medal "70 Years of the Armed Forces of the USSR"

Foreign

- (Russia) Order of Zhukov

== See also ==
- Armed Forces of Armenia

== Notes ==
Political offices
Preceded by Mikael Harutyunyan	Minister of Defence of Armenia; 2008 – 2016	Succeeded by Vigen Sargsyan
