= Armine Tumanyan =

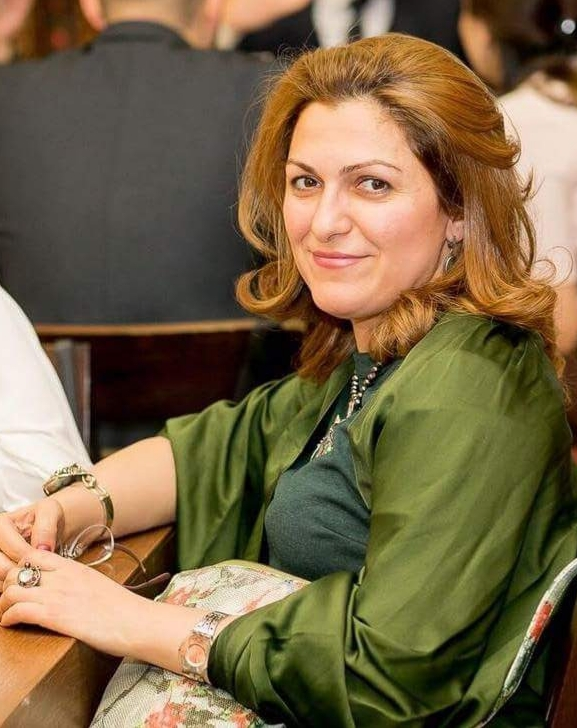
- Born: Armine Tumanyan; July 12, 1975 (age 51); Yerevan, Armenia
- Education: Armenian State Pedagogical University; Yerevan State Academy of Fine Arts
- Known for: paintings, art
- Spouse: Hayk Chobanyan

Armine A. Tumanyan (Armenian: Արմինե Թումանյան; born July 12, 1975, in Yerevan, Armenian SSR), is an Armenian painter, designer, coordinator of painting exhibitions. She is a member of the Artists' Union of Armenia, Head of Tavush Branch, and Director of Tavush Spiritual Revival Foundation.

== Biography ==
Armine Tumanyan was born in 1975 in Yerevan. She graduated from the Department of Fine Arts of the Armenian State Pedagogical University with a degree in Fine Arts. She studied Fashion Design and Design at the State Academy of Fine Arts of Armenia (MA). In 2016 she founded the " ArtAm Gallery " platform at Zvartnots Airport, where she presents contemporary Armenian artists through exhibitions.

The theme of Armine Tumanyan's works are: human in harmony with nature, the origins and present of Armenia, the reproduction of women's inner world, their mental state.

== Exhibitions ==
As an artist

She has participated in group exhibitions in Canada (2012), Israel (2013), Taiwan (2015), Israel (2015).

Participated in painting symposiums in Serbia, Israel. She was the representative of the International Arts and Crafts Festival in Israel.

- "Your Name is a Woman", 2019, Naregatsi Art Institute, Yerevan and Shushi

"The world of women is very deep and diverse, incomprehensible to many. Today I have presented the image of eight women of different nationalities and the image of the most important women - Mary the Virgin, who is the source of my inspiration. In these works my essence is expressed in all sincerity – with love, excitement, faith". - Armine Tumanyan

- "Armenian Myths", 2018, Art-Aquarium Exhibition Hall of the Russian-Armenian University
- 5 Women Artists Exhibition at UN Office in Yerevan, 2018
- Eternal Traveler, Yerevan History Museum, 2017

As a coordinator

- Exhibition of 4 different genres at Converse Bank
- "Karas Art. Creativity on Barrels" Painting Contest
- "Art, Wine and Tango" 14 floor Hotel, Yerevan:
- Exhibition of 10 Armenian painters in the Kyiv National Gallery, 2017
- International Painting Symposium "Tavush through the Eyes of the World", 2019 (23 artists from 17 countries, and 7 artists from Armenia participated)

== Awards ==
- International Art Symposium Diplomas of Serbia, Lithuania, Moldova, South Korea

== Family ==
She is married to Hayk Chobanyan. They have two children - a daughter and a son.
