= Norat Ter-Grigoryants =

Retired Soviet and Armenian lieutenant-general (born 1936)

- Նորատ Տեր-Գրիգորյանց
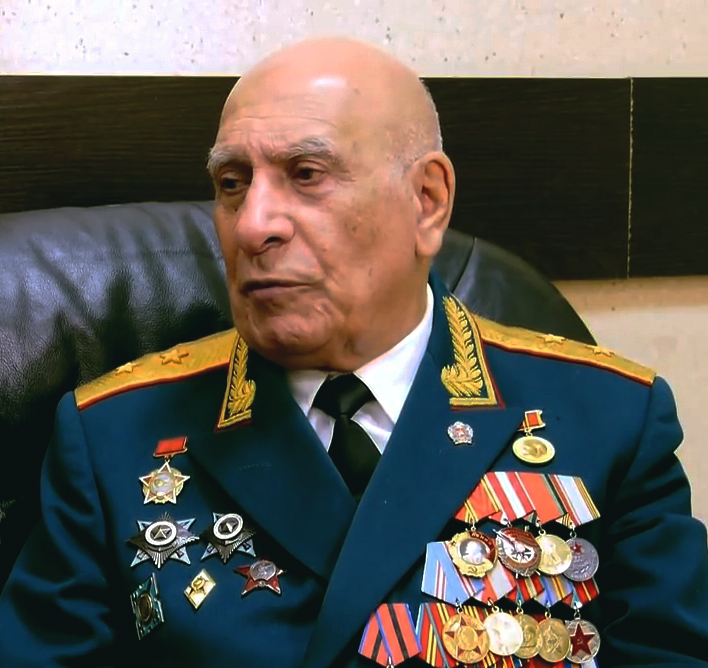
- Norat Ter-Grigoryants in October 2019
- Born: 16 July 1936 (age 90); Vladikavkaz, Russian SFSR, Soviet Union
- Military career
- Allegiance: Soviet Union; Armenia
- Branch: Soviet Army; Armed Forces of Armenia
- Service years: 1955–1991; 1992–1995
- Rank: Lieutenant-general
- Commands: 40th Army; Soviet Ground Forces
- Conflicts: Soviet–Afghan War; First Nagorno-Karabakh War
- Awards: see below
- Other work: First Deputy Defence minister of Armenia, 1992–1995; Acting Defence minister of Armenia, 1993

Norat Grigoryevich Ter-Grigoryants (Armenian: Նորատ Գրիգորիի Տեր-Գրիգորյանց, Russian: Нора́т Григо́рьевич Тер-Григорья́нц; born 16 July 1936) is a retired Soviet and Armenian lieutenant-general who played a leading role in developing the Armed Forces of Armenia in 1992–1995, including during the First Nagorno-Karabakh War.

An Armenian from the Russian Soviet Federative Socialist Republic who served as chief of staff for the Soviet 40th Army in Afghanistan and deputy chief of the Soviet Ground Forces' main staff before the dissolution of the Soviet Union in 1991, Ter-Grigoryants took up the Armenian government's invitation to take command of the Armenian Ground Forces in 1992. Ter-Grigoryants became the head of the general staff and the Armenian government's first deputy minister of defense in 1992–1995. He briefly served as named Acting Defence minister of Armenia in 1993.

He returned to the Russian Federation since his retirement in 1995 and is a member of the board of the Union of Armenians of Russia.

== Biography ==
Norat Ter-Grigoryants was born and educated in the city of Vladikavkaz in the Russian Soviet Federative Socialist Republic of the Soviet Union, where his Armenian family had come in the 1920s after fleeing from the Armenian genocide in the Ottoman Empire. His parents were from Erzurum Province (part of the Ottoman Empire) and Kars (an Armenian province in the Russian Empire annexed by the Turks in the aftermath of World War I).

=== Soviet Army: 1955–1991 ===
Ter-Grigoryants initially entered the Soviet Army as a conscript in 1955, but rejoined in 1957 to become an officer and graduated from the Ulyanovsk Tank School in 1960. He subsequently attended the Vystrel higher officers' course and graduated from the Malinovsky Military Academy of the Armored Troops in Moscow in 1973. He attended the Voroshilov General Staff Academy as a major-general and graduated in 1980.

Ter-Grigoryants was stationed in Afghanistan for three years in the early 1980s and was awarded the Order of Lenin for his work as chief of staff to Major-General Viktor Yermakov's 40th Army in Afghanistan in 1982–1983. Ter-Grigoryants was made deputy chief of the Main Staff of the Ground Forces of the USSR upon returning from Afghanistan in late 1983 and remained deputy chief as a lieutenant-general until 1991.

=== Armenian Army: 1992–1995 ===
The dissolution of the Soviet Union in 1991 turned the violent and increasingly warlike ethnic conflict between Armenians and Azeris that had developed during the Gorbachev period over the Nagorno-Karabakh region into a full-scale undeclared war between the newly independent Armenian and Azerbaijani states. Armenia's government invited Ter-Grigoryants to assume command of the Armenian Army in 1992. Assisting the minister of defense, a military non-professional, Grigoryants was simultaneously named to the post of first deputy defense minister. His formal position was changed to head of the general staff and first deputy minister of defense soon after, when the position of the overall Armenian Army commander was phased out in the course of the ongoing military reform, but he remained a key figure in organizing the Armenian military into an effective force and developing the country's military doctrine. In June 1993, Ter-Grigoryants replaced Defense Minister Vazgen Manukyan in acting capacity following his leave until the appointment of Serzh Sargsyan a month later.

Ter-Grigoryants' development of Armenian military doctrine emphasized the role of motorized brigades to allow for operational mobility and flexibility. The air defense forces, previously almost non-existent, were also equipped and organized.

=== Since 1995 ===
Ter-Grigoryants retired in 1995, shortly after the end of the war in Nagorno-Karabakh in 1994. He has resided in the Russian Federation since 1995, but maintains his ties to Armenia and Russia's Armenian community.

Ter-Grigoryants is a president emeritus of the Council of Veterans of Russian Land Forces and a board member of the Union of Armenians of Russia. Ter-Grigoryants surrendered his Armenian passport and was stripped of Armenian citizenship in September 2026.

== Awards ==
- (Soviet Union) Order of Lenin
- (Soviet Union) Order of the Red Banner
- (Soviet Union) Order of the Red Star
- (Soviet Union) Order for Service to the Homeland in the Armed Forces of the USSR, 2nd class
- (Soviet Union) Order for Service to the Homeland in the Armed Forces of the USSR, 3rd class
- (Soviet Union) Jubilee Medal "In Commemoration of the 100th Anniversary since the Birth of Vladimir Il'ich Lenin"
- (Soviet Union) Jubilee Medal "Twenty Years of Victory in the Great Patriotic War 1941–1945"
- (Soviet Union) Medal "Veteran of the Armed Forces of the USSR"
- (Soviet Union) Medal "For Strengthening of Brotherhood in Arms"
- (Soviet Union) Jubilee Medal "50 Years of the Armed Forces of the USSR"
- (Soviet Union) Jubilee Medal "60 Years of the Armed Forces of the USSR"
- (Soviet Union) Jubilee Medal "70 Years of the Armed Forces of the USSR"
- (Soviet Union) Medal "For Impeccable Service", 1st class
- (Soviet Union) Medal "For Impeccable Service", 2nd class
- Medal "30 Years of Victory over militaristic Japan"
- Order of the Red Banner
- (Soviet Union) Medal "Soldiers-internationalists"
- (Armenia) Order of the Combat Cross, 1st degree
- (Armenia) Medal of Marshal Baghramyan
