= Medal of Marshal Baghramyan =

Armenian military award

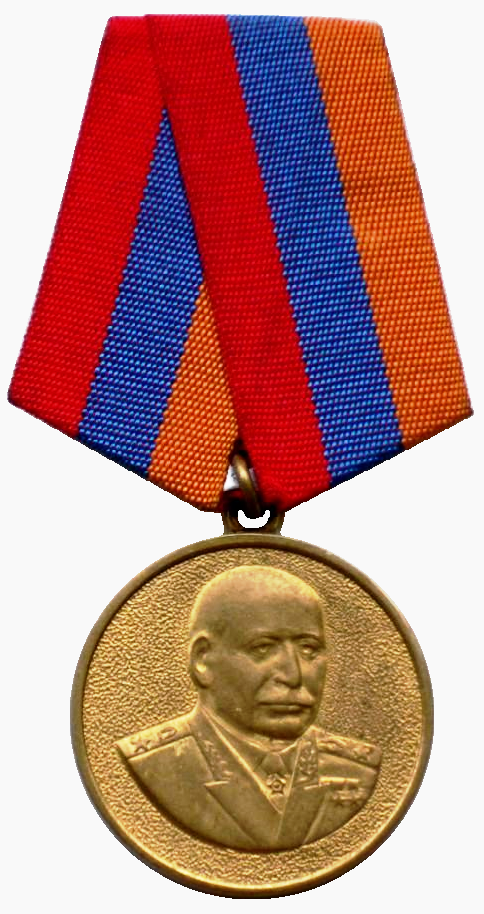
- Medal of Marshal Baghramyan
- Type: State decoration
- Awarded for: Bravery, selflessness and personal courage in fighting for the protection of the Motherland.
- Presented by: Armenia
- Eligibility: Members of the armed forces and veterans of the Second World War
- Established: 11 May 1997
- Ribbon of the Medal of Marshal Baghramyan

Precedence
- Next (higher): Combat Service Medal

The Medal of Marshal Baghramyan (Armenian: «Մարշալ Բաղրամյան» Մեդալ) is a state award of Armenia awarded first and foremost to veterans of the Great Patriotic War as well as active servicemen of the Armed Forces of Armenia. It is named in honour of Marshal of the Soviet Union Ivan Bagramyan, one of the few ethnic Armenians to attain that rank and the second non-Slavic military officer (after Latvian Max Reyter) to command a Red Army Front. It was instituted in 1997 on the occasion of his centennial.

== Award statute ==
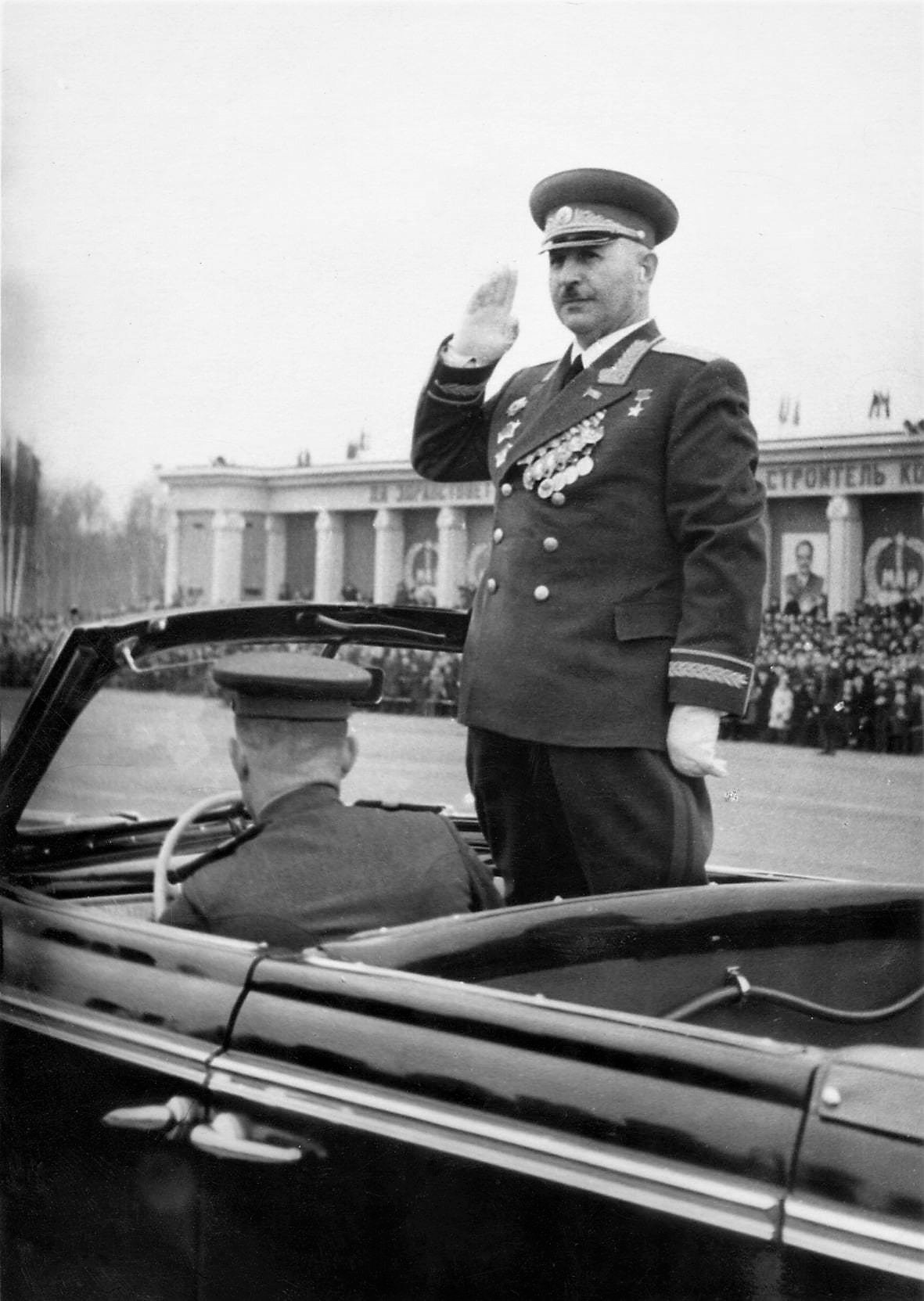
Ivan Bagramyan, who is the namesake for the medal, during a military parade in Riga in 1955.

The Marshal Baghramyan Medal is awarded to persons who participated in hostilities in the Second World War, labor veterans who are actively involved in the education of youth in a military-patriotic spirit, generals and officers, rank and file and sergeants of the armed forces, which were directly involved in the hostilities during the defense of the borders of Armenia. An application for the award of the Marshal Baghramyan Medal is submitted by the Council of the Union of Veterans of the Ministry of Defense as well as the Marshal Baghramyan Foundation. The medal is awarded on the orders of Ministry of Defense of Armenia. The medal is issued a certificate of wearing it. The medal is worn on the left side of the chest, after the Combat Service Medal. The medal may also be awarded to veterans and military personnel of the CIS countries and other states. Every year, on Shushi Liberation Day (8 May), which is the eve of Victory and Peace Day, the Minister of Defense of Armenia presents about 100 medals to Armenian veterans.

== Recipients ==
=== Notable ===
- Levon Mnatsakanyan – Former Minister of Defence of Artsakh.
- Yuri Khatchaturov – Former Secretary-General of the Collective Security Treaty Organization (CSTO).
- Mikael Harutyunyan – 7th Defence Minister of Armenia.
- Seyran Ohanyan – Former Defence Minister of Armenia and Artsakh.
- Alvard Petrossyan – Armenian writer, philologist and publicist.
- Norat Ter-Grigoryants – Retired Soviet and Armenian lieutenant-general who played a leading role during the First Nagorno-Karabakh War.
- Seyran Shahsuvaryan – Former Press Secretary of the Ministry of Defence of Armenia.
- Kristapor Ivanyan – One of the founders of the Nagorno-Karabakh Defense Army.
- Armen Poghosyan (military musician) – Senior Military Director of the Band of the General Staff of the Armed Forces of Armenia.
- Hayk M. Grigoryan – Armenian lawyer and Chairman of the Investigative Committee.
- Valery Gerasimov – The current Chief of the General Staff of the Armed Forces of Russia.
- Hayk Chobanyan – Minister of High-Tech Industry

=== Other ===
On 18 July 2002, the Armenian Embassy in Tbilisi ceremonially awarded 8 veterans of the 89th Rifle Division with the medal.

== See also ==
- Orders, decorations, and medals of Armenia
- National Hero of Armenia
