= General Staff of the Armenian Armed Forces =

Military staff of the Armed Forces of Armenia

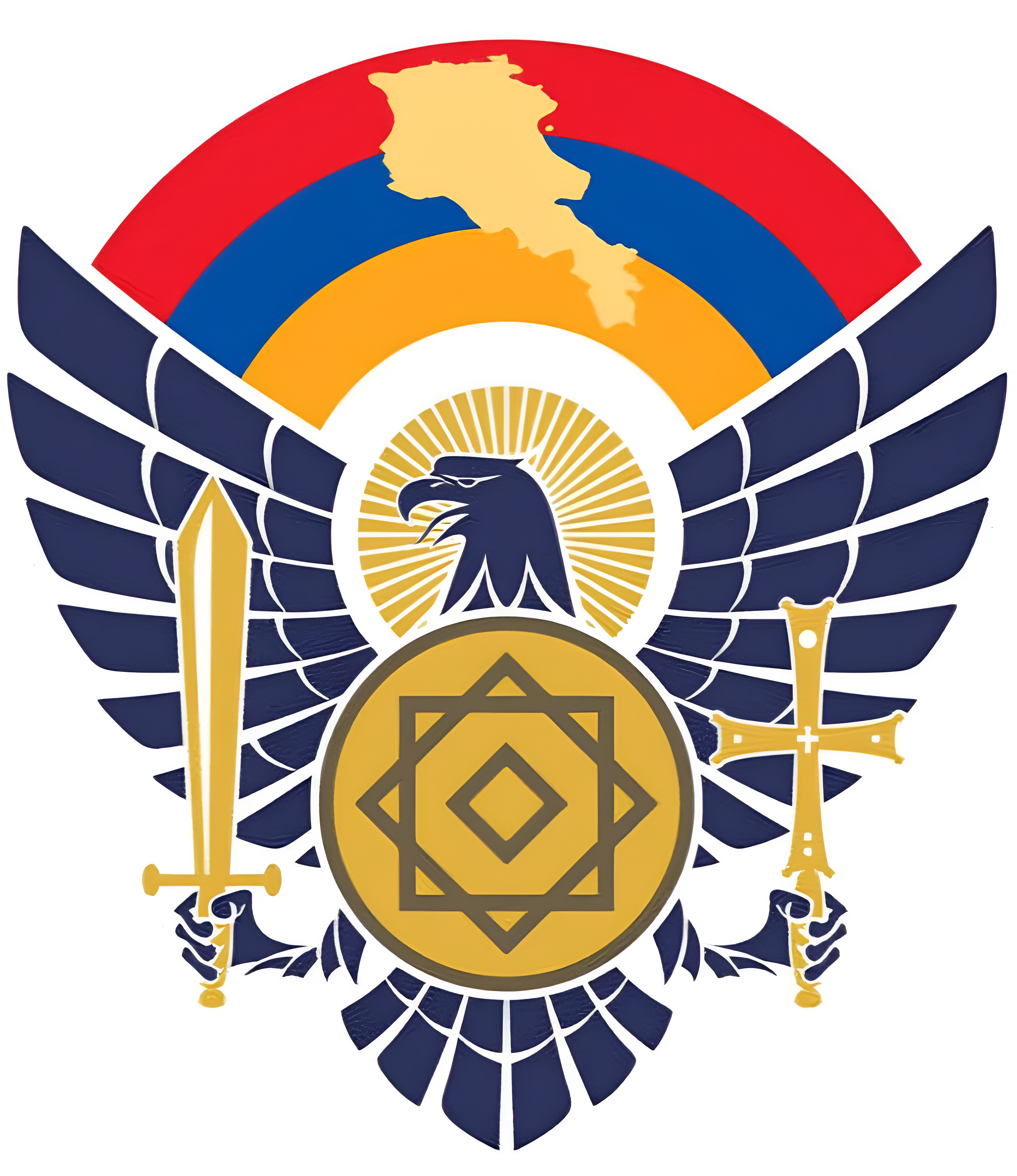
Coat of Arms of the Armed Forces of Armenia

The General Staff of the Armed Forces of Armenia (Armenian: Հայաստանի զինված ուժերի գլխավոր շտաբ, Hayastani zinvats uzheri glkhavor shtab) is the military staff of the Armed Forces of Armenia. The current Chief of the General Staff is Lieutenant General Edvard Asryan. The headquarters of the General Staff is located on 5 Bagrevand Street in the Nor Nork District of Yerevan.

== General information ==
The general staff is the chief organizing and executive body in the armed forces responsible for maintaining its combat readiness. It is subordinate in precedence to the Ministry of Defense. According to the Military Doctrine of Armenia, the functions of the General Staff of the Armed Forces include the holistic operational command and control of troops, including combat units and rear support units, as well as the planning and coordination of peacetime activities of all armed units. The Chief of the General Staff is appointed directly by the Prime Minister of Armenia (with confirmation done by the President), who is also the supreme commander-in-chief of the armed forces. He/she holds the rank of Colonel general (General-gndapet).

=== Operations ===
Since July 2019, a hotline service known as the "Trust Line" has been operating at the General Staff with the aim of promptly responding to the servicemen's statements, complaints and suggestions, as well as to strengthen the army-society ties.

=== Political interventions ===
On 25 February 2021, the General Staff issued a statement signed by more than 40 other top Armenian generals (including General Onik Gasparyan) calling for the resignation of Prime Minister Nikol Pashinyan, stating that Pashinyan and his government "are no longer able to make proper decisions in this fateful moment of crisis for the Armenian people." The General Staff's statement was triggered by Pashinyan's dismissal of the first deputy chief of the General Staff Tiran Khachatryan a day earlier. The statement resulted in Pashinyan condemning as a coup attempt, signing an order twice to dismiss Gasparyan from his post, the first of which was not signed by president Armen Sargsyan. Many saw the statement as an unprecedented engagement in politics on the part of the military. The co-rapporteurs of the Parliamentary Assembly of the Council of Europe for the monitoring of Armenia found the statement issued by the General Staff "to be unacceptable", while the United States Department of State warned the General Staff not to involve itself in politics. The newly appointed chief Artak Davtyan declared in his opening speech that he is "confident that the Armed Forces will not take part in any political process not stipulated by the Constitution and laws."

== Personnel branches ==
- Department of Military Preparedness
- Department of Military Apparatus
- Department of Aviation
- Department of Missile Troops
- Department of Air Defence
- Department of Rear Services
- Department of Signal Troops
- Department of the Engineer Troops
- Department of Armaments
- Department of the RNBC Defence Troops
- Medical Department
- Personnel Department
- Intelligence Department
- Strategic Planning Department
- Mobilization Department
- Operative Department
- Department of Military Service Security
- Department of Military Commissars
- Financial Department
- Human Resources Department

=== Department of Missile Troops ===
As a structural subdivision of the Armenian Army, the missile and artillery units of the armed forces was born in the tumult of the Artsakh War. Almost all combat operations in 1994 were accompanied by the specialized use of artillery. On 30 October 1993, by order of the Minister of Defense 1993, October 19 was recognized as Missile Artillery Day. 19 October is the professional holiday of the missile troops. Today the missile troops of the RA Armed Forces are equipped with missile, artillery-anti-tank brigades, regiments, separate artillery-reactive artillery divisions.

The following have been appointed to the position of the head of the missile troops department.

- Major General Vladimir Hayrapetyan (1992–2003)
- Lieutenant General Martin Karapetyan (2003–2008)
- Major General Albert Mardoyan (2008–2017)
- Colonel Armen Harutyunyan (Since 2017)

=== Department of Aviation ===
In January 1992, the General Directorate of Aviation and Air Defense Forces was created as part of the newly created Ministry of Defense. In 1992, by order of Minister of Defense Vazgen Sargsyan, the aviation department was separated from the air defense department and became a separate structure. As a result of the reorganization and restructuring of the DOSAAF flying club and the "Arzni" airport and their transfer in 1992 to the Ministry of Defense, the Aviation Training Center was founded.

=== Department of Air Defence ===
The Air Defence Force is part of the Armenian Air Force. It was equipped and organized as part of the military reform program of Ter-Grigoriants. At the time, about 400 non-commissioned officers were drafted. At the same time, light anti-aircraft defense units were formed in the motorized rifle regiments and brigades, which later turned into batteries and divisions. Armenian Air Defence forces comprise an anti-aircraft missile brigade and two regiments armed with 100 missile launchers of mostly Soviet and now Russian manufacture.

=== Department of the Engineer Troops ===
7 September is defined as the Day of the Engineering Troops of the Armed Forces. It was founded by the order of the Minister of Defense in 1992. Since 8 September 2009, the Engineering Service has been reorganized as the Department of Engineering Troops in the Ministry of Defense. The following have served as heads of the department:

- Colonel Ashot Mardanyan (1992–1995)
- Lieutenant General Alik Mirzabekyan (1995–98)
- Major General Vostanik Adoyan (1999–2011)
- Major General Karen Abrahamyan (2011–2015)
- Major General Ishkhan Matosyan (since 2015)

Extensive work is underway in the defense zones of military units, unions and military units by the engineering troops to install large-scale equipment. In addition, the units of the Engineering Troops carry out humanitarian demining operations in the regions of Armenia, Artsakh, as well as in the framework of cooperation with NATO. The department's engineers have taken part in competitions of CIS member-states Armed Forces’ engineer corps, took the third place, whereas in driving contests of some engineer vehicles they took the first place.

=== Department of Signal Troops ===
The Signal Troops of the Armed Forces were formed during the Artsakh War. The main development of the military communication system began in 1992. In 1992, the Communication Department was formed within the General Staff of the Armed Forces. The educational base of liaison officers is located at the Khanperyants Military Aviation Institute, with the first batch graduating in 2006. The Communication Department has been headed by:

- Colonel Vladimir Mkrtchyan (1992–1993) (acting head)
- Colonel Alexander Balbabyan (1993–1995)
- Major General Arthur Papazyan (1995–2002)
- Major General Armen Baburyan (2003–2009)
- Colonel Ferdinand Solomonyan (2009) (acting chief)
- Major General Komitas Muradyan (2009–2016)
- Major General Temur Shahnazaryan (since 2016)

== Divisions and Units ==
- Physical Training and Sports Division
- Radioelectronic Division
- Military Communications Division
- Department of Troops Service
- Military Topography Division
- 8th Division of the General Staff
- Standardization and Metrology Division
- Military Band Division (which sports the Band of the General Staff of the Armed Forces of Armenia)
- Choir Unit

=== Military Topography Service ===
The military topographic service was established on September 3, 1992. In November 1992, the military topographic department of the Armed Forces and the military unit subordinate to it developed and printed the first topographic maps of the area, which were used during the liberation of the territories of Armenia. On September 1, 1993, the military topographic department of the General Staff of the Armed Forces was created. Until 1998, the military topographic service was staffed mainly by conscripts and officers serving on conscription. Since 2000, the service has been staffed with specialists who graduated from higher military educational institutions of the Russian Federation. From 1992 to 2002, topographic maps were designed and drawn by hand and since then, topographic maps have been developed on a computer using satellite photographs. It currently carries out topographic and geodetic support for combat training in the Armed Forces.

=== 8th Division of the General Staff ===
The Security Service (8th Division) of ensures the provision, management and control of the cryptographic service and security regime in the Armed Forces. It was founded in 1992 under the direction of Major Alexander Barkhudaryan.

=== Physical Training and Sports Service ===
A physical training department was created in the Armed Forces in 1996. The physical training department was established in 2014. After the redefinition, it was renamed as the Department of Physical Training and Sports of the Armed Forces. From the day of its formation, the General Head of the Physical Training and Sports Department of the Armed Forces was the Deputy Minister of Defense, Lieutenant-General Mikael Grigoryan, The functions of the department are to improve the level of physical training among servicemen. The department provides the military units with appropriate sports equipment, building materials, drawings and literature for the construction of sports facilities. 30 standard sports grounds, 44 non-standard sports grounds, 24 standard barriers, 1 non-standard barrier, 10 handball fields, 16 gyms, 47 football fields have been built and furnished since 1996 for the practical training of the personnel.

=== Military Band Service ===
The Military Band Division of the General Staff oversees all of the military bands in Armenia. The army sports the following bands:

- Band of the General Staff (the seniormost military band in the entire military)
- 1st Army Corps Concert Orchestra

Currently, potential musicians participate in 5-year training courses at the Military Institute of Military Conductors of the Military University of the Ministry of Defense of the Russian Federation. After completing these courses, cadets receive the rank of Lieutenant and the qualification of a military conductor of a brass band. In order to become a conductor, elementary music education is required. Since 2004, an agreement with the Komitas State Conservatory of Yerevan has been in place, under which five conductors a year were prepared for the band, which gave it the opportunity to replenish all bands with qualified personnel. Since 2019, it was decided to send musicians to study in military schools in order to receive the education of a full-fledged conductor. Citizens of a pre-draft age, as well as male citizens and military personnel who have passed or are undergoing compulsory military service (whose age does not exceed 23 years), can take part in admission to military schools. 60 percent of the band are contract soldiers, with the rest being military conscripts.

== Current leaders ==
- Chief of the General Staff – Lieutenant General Edvard Asryan
- First Deputy Chief of the General Staff – Lieutenant General Kamo Kochunts
- Deputy Chief of the General Staff – Major General Arakel Martikyan
- Head of the Operative Department – Colonel Armen Gyozalyan

== See also ==
- Chief of the General Staff
- General Staff of Azerbaijani Armed Forces
- General Staff of the Defense Forces of Georgia
