= Republic Day (Armenia) =

National holiday in Armenia

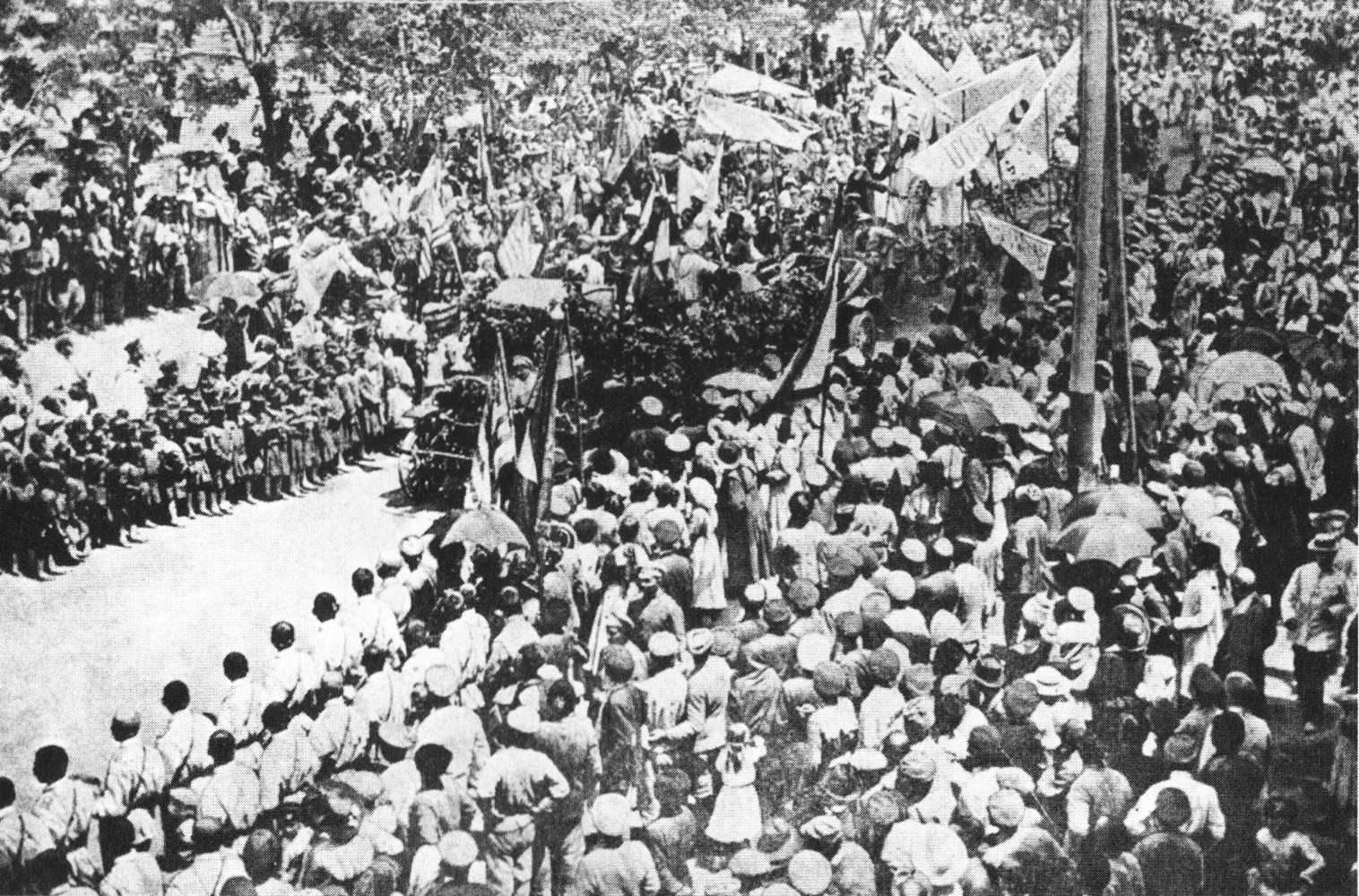
- Republic Day celebrations in May 1919.
- Official name: Հանրապտության օր
- Also called: National Day
- Observed by: Armenia
- Significance: Commemorates the founding of the First Armenian Republic.
- Celebrations: Military parades, ceremonies
- Date: 28 May
- Next time: 28 May 2027
- Frequency: annual
- Related to: Independence Day (Armenia)

Republic Day (Armenian: Հանրապետության օր, romanized: Hanrapetut’yan or) is a national holiday in Armenia marking the anniversary of the First Armenian Republic in 1918. It is commonly celebrated with fireworks, concerts, parades, and parties. It is considered to be the national day of Armenia.

== History ==
Shortly after the start of the First World War, the Ottoman Empire began forcible expulsion of Armenians from the empire. Women, children and elderly people were forced to leave Armenia and go to Syria and Russia. 1 to 1.5 million people were killed in what is now known as the Armenian genocide. Following the genocide, the Armenian National Council Declared its sovereignty on 28 May 1918. Armenia was proclaimed an independent republic on 28 May 1918. The republic immediately experienced massive hunger, and a massive influx of refugees. The republic was short lived, and as of 2 December 1920 the Red Army invaded Armenia and proclaimed it a Soviet Republic. Armenia regained its independence in 1991.

== Festivities ==
=== The first celebrations ===
The first celebrations of Republic Day since the Sovietization of Armenia took place at the start of the Karabakh movement. On the First Republic's 70th anniversary in 1988, the Flag of Armenia was first raised in front of Matenadaran. During a demonstration numbering tens of thousands in Yerevan, 5000 protesters appeared carrying the tricolor flag and portraits of Andranik, Garegin Nzhdeh and Armenian fedayis. According to Verluise, this day "marked a radicalisation of [Armenian] national aspirations".

=== General celebrations ===
The Republic Day celebrations coincide with the anniversary of the Battle of Sardarabad, which pushed the invading Ottoman Army out of Armenia. Every year, the President of Armenia, the Prime Minister of Armenia, and the President of Artsakh visits the Sardarapat Memorial to lay a wreath at the monument. Many cultural and military events also take place on Republic Day. While in 2020, republic day was marked without the traditional public events and festive ceremonies due to restrictions to slow the spread of COVID-19.

=== 100th Anniversary ===
The year 2018 marked the centennial of the founding of the First Armenian Republic. Armenia spent 618 million dram on events marking the anniversary. The ceremonies (known as the "Century of Victories") were attended by the President Armen Sarkissian, Prime Minister Nikol Pashinyan, President of Artsakh Bako Sahakyan, and Catholicos of All Armenians Karekin II.

A ceremonial military parade was held at the Sardarapat Memorial, which featured hundreds of soldiers dressed in military uniforms from the First Armenian, Red Army uniforms from World War II, as well as veterans of the first Nagorno-Karabakh War. Historical vehicles such as the T-90 were also on display. It also featured subdivisions of corps of the Armenian Army, the Border Service of the National Security Service, the Police of Armenia, forces of the Ministry of Emergency Situations and, for the first time, servicemen of the Russian 102nd Military Base.

In the evening, on Yerevan's Republic Square, a 3D show took place.

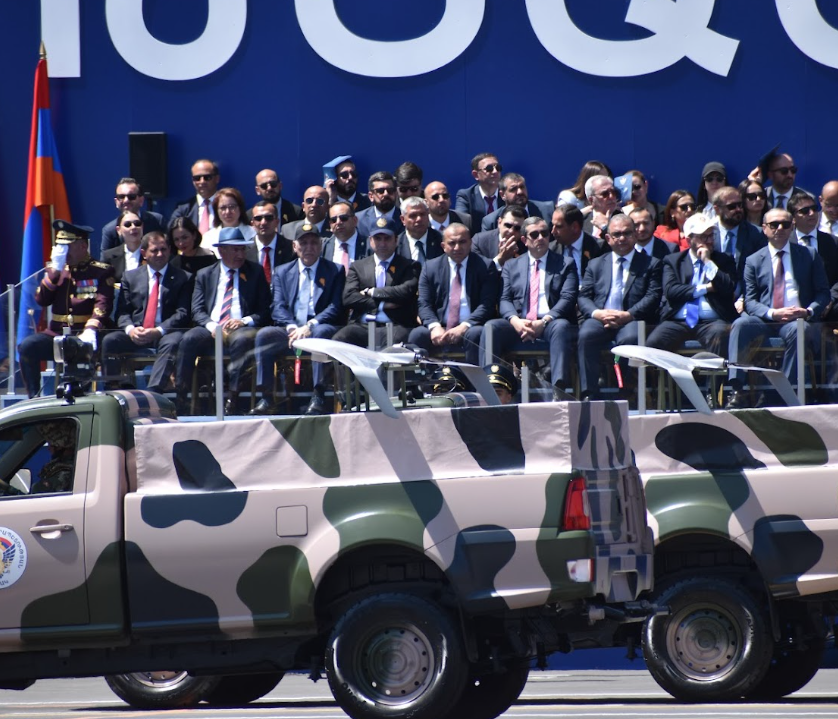
A UL-450 at the parade.

=== 2026 military parade ===
On the 108th anniversary of the republic in 2026, a military parade was held in Yerevan, on Republic Square, the first republic day parade on the square since 1992 and the first full-scale parade in a decade). It was commanded by Chief of the General Staff Edvard Asryan and inspected by Defense Minister Suren Papikyan, who inspected the parade on a Nissan Patrol SUV. 14 military formations took part in the parade.

- Colour Guard carrying the Flag of Armenia, the flag of the Ministry of Defence, and the flag of King Ashot II the Iron.
- Monte Melkonian Military College
- Vazgen Sargsyan Military Academy
- National Defense Research University
- Special forces of Armenia
- 12th Peacekeeping Brigade
- Territorial Defense Forces
- Military Police
- Women's Contingent
- National Security Service Special Forces Troops
- Border Troops of the National Security Service
- Special Army Corps
- 2nd Army Corps
- 3rd Army Corps
- 5th Army Corps
- Honour Guard of the Ministry of Defense of Armenia
- Band of the General Staff of the Armed Forces of Armenia
