= Territorial Defense Forces (Armenia) =

- Տարածքային պաշտպանության ուժեր; Taratsk’ayin pashtpanut’yan uzher
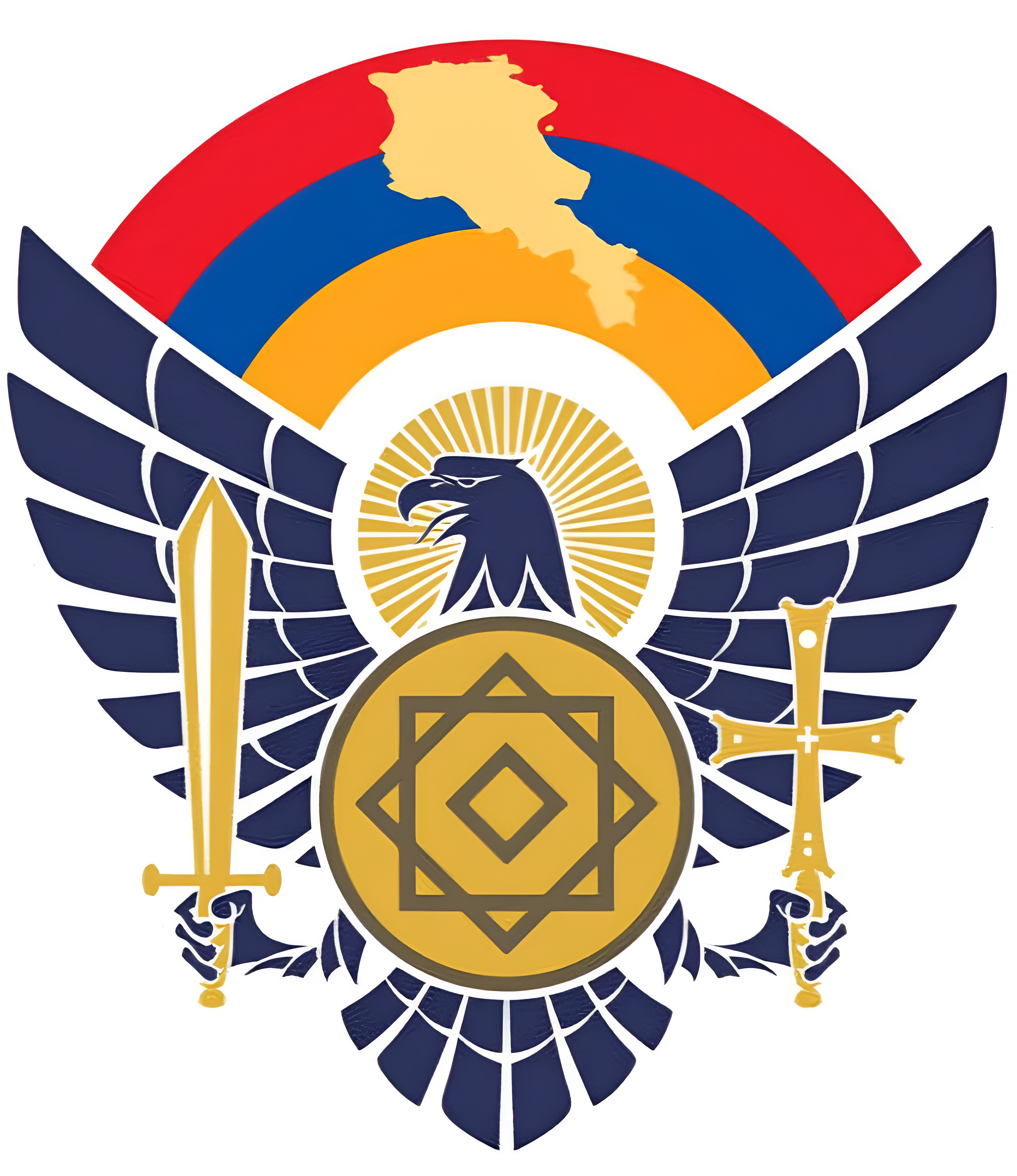
- Coat of Arms of Armenian Armed Forces
- Founded: 2020; 6 years ago
- Country: Armenia
- Type: Military reserve force
- Role: Light infantry Home guard
- Part of: Armenian Armed Forces

Commanders
- Commander-in-Chief: Nikol Pashinyan
- Minister of Defense: Suren Papikyan
- Commander: Major General Samvel Minasyan

The Territorial Defense Forces (Armenian: Տարածքային պաշտպանության ուժեր, romanized: Taratsk’ayin pashtpanut’yan uzher), also known as Ashkharazor (Armenian: Աշխարհազոր), which refers to "territorial defense" or "people's militia" in Armenian) is the volunteer reserve branch of the Armed Forces of Armenia. Established in 2020, the force serves as a military reserve component designed to support the regular army during armed conflicts, as well as guard critical infrastructure, and defend the state's borders in support of the Border Troops of Armenia.

== History ==
Before 2020, Armenia relied on a traditional mobilization system of military reservists and ad-hoc volunteer detachments, which saw heavy action during the First Nagorno-Karabakh War and the Nagorno-Karabakh conflict at large. However, the lack of a standardized, legally integrated local defense network led to logistical and command challenges. In August 2020, the Ministry of Defense of Armenia introduced draft legislation to create a structured, nationwide militia. The National Assembly of Armenia formally passed amendments to the Law on Defense, officially creating the Territorial Defense Forces. During the war the following month, volunteer battalion such as the Tigran Mets Regiment, the Azatazen unit or the Erato Detachment served on front line duty.

Following security vulnerabilities exposed during the Second Nagorno-Karabakh War, the Second Pashinyan government shifted its defense strategy toward the concept of "total defense." As a result, the idea of Ashkharazor was heavily integrated into the country's multi-year Armed Forces Transformation Concept. This reform shifted the force from a loose militia concept into a highly structured, state-funded component of national deterrence, ensuring all border regions possessed immediate defensive capabilities.

On 31 October 2024, the Cabinet approved a bill on officially creating territorial defense forces to replace the militia system. On 17 December 2025, the Territorial Defense Forces Command received its military flag from Chief of the General Staff Lieutenant General Edvard Asryan.

== Organization ==
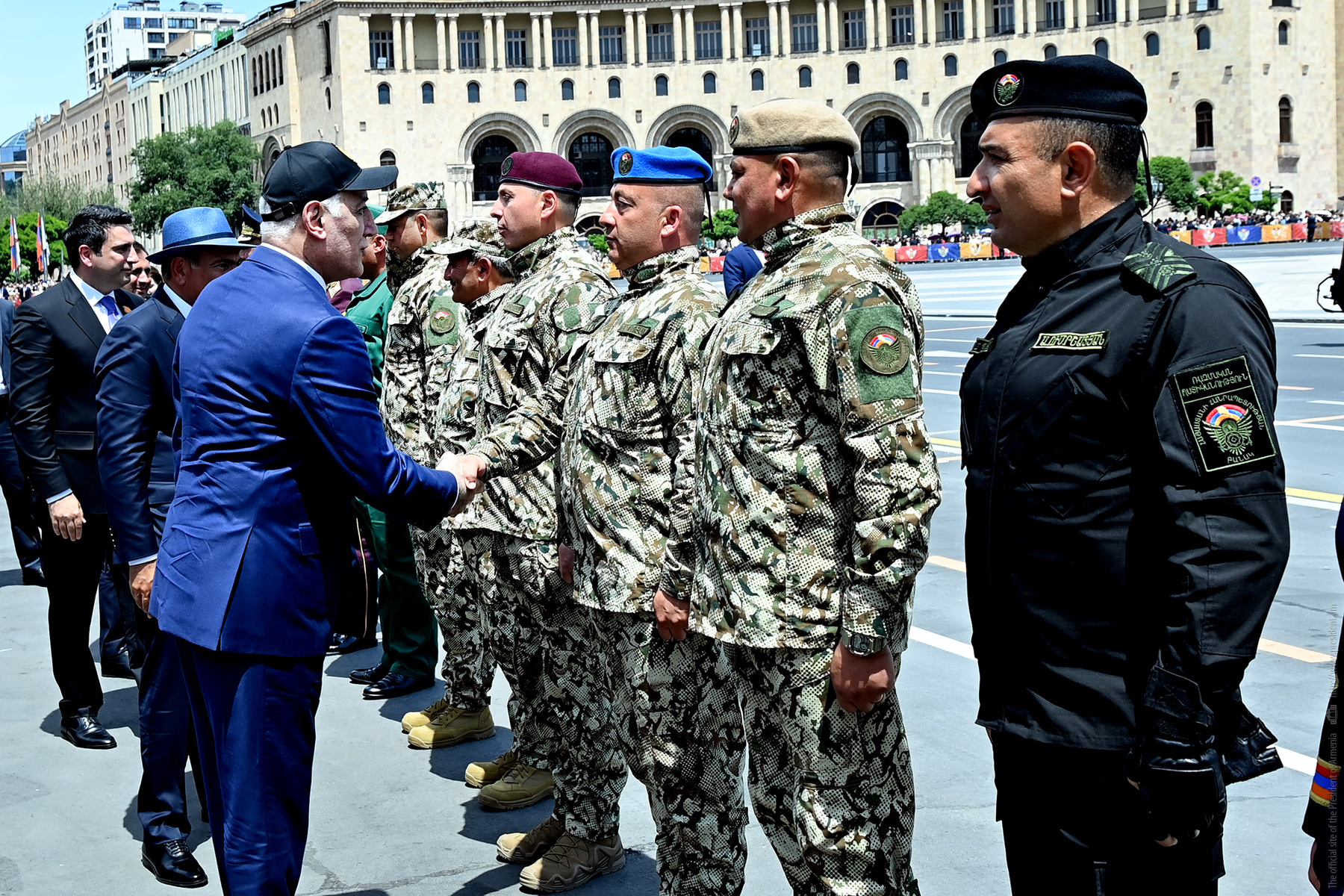
Major General Samvel Minasyan shaking hands with President Vahagn Khachaturyanat the Republic Day parade in Yerevan, 28 May 2026.

The Territorial Defense Forces are organized along the Administrative divisions of Armenia, with a Central Command reporting to the General Staff of the Armed Forces of Armenia. The forces are divided into territorial brigades, subdivisions, and local platoons. Brigade and subdivision commanders are typically appointed from the regular military officer corps or qualified local officials, ensuring direct communication lines with regional army corps.

=== Commanders ===
- Major General Samvel Minasyan (since 27 July 2023)

== Personnel ==
Membership is voluntary but operates on a structured contractual framework. The force recruits male and female citizens up to 70 years of age, primarily targeting those who are not otherwise bound to mandatory wartime mobilization slots in the regular army. Volunteers undergo periodic military training exercises. Members of the forces will be subject to military code of conduct and other responsibilities envisaged for all members of the armed forces.

== See Also ==
- Ministry of Defense of Armenia
- Territorial Defense Forces (Ukraine)
- National Guard (United States)
- Designated Reserves (Czech Republic)
