= Stepan Mirzoyan (general) =

Lieutenant General Stepan Vahani Mirzoyan (Armenian: Ստեփան Վահանի Միրզոյան; November 8, 1945 - May 18, 2013), Soviet and Armenian military figure who served in high positions within the Soviet Army and the Armed Forces of Armenia.

== Military service ==
He was born on November 8, 1945, in Yerevan, the capital of the Armenian SSR. From 1964 to 1966, he served in the Soviet Army. In 1968, he graduated from the Baku Higher Combined Arms Command School. In 1974, he was a student at the Frunze Military Academy in Moscow. From 1976 to 1979, Chief of Staff of the Regiment in the Central Asian Military District. From 1979 to 1984, he held a number of command positions in the Soviet Armed Forces. In 1984, he was appointed Chief of Staff of the 8th Guards Motor Rifle Division and was sent to the Democratic Republic of Afghanistan during the Soviet–Afghan War for military service as part of the Limited Contingent of Soviet Forces in Afghanistan. There, he served as an advisor to the commander of the national division.

== Armenia ==
In 1990, at his personal request, he moved to the Armenian Soviet Socialist Republic and was appointed to the Republican Military Commissariat as the head of the mobilization department and deputy military commissar. He also actively participated in the First Nagorno-Karabakh War. After the war, he joined the Ministry of Defense of the Republic of Armenia, serving from 1994 to 1997 as Head of the Personnel Department. He then was made commander of the 3rd Army Corps, before being appointed as the Head of the Vazgen Sargsyan Military Institute in 2000. He was promoted to Lieutenant general on Army Day in 2004. He served in this capacity until 2007. From 2009 to 2013, he was Chairman of the Defense Issues Subcommittee of the Defense, Internal Affairs and National Security Issues Committee of the Public Council of Armenia. From 2012 to 2013, he was Chairman of the Higher Officers' Commission under the Minister of Defense of Armenia.

He died on 18 May 2013 at the age of 67. He was married and had 2 sons.

== Awards ==
- Medal "For Services to the Homeland", 1s Degree (July 2006)
