= Battles for Shulaveri =

1918 battle of the Armeno-Georgian War

- Part of the Armeno-Georgian War
Date	December 20–28, 1918
Location	Shulaver, Borchalu uezd
Result	First battle: Armenian victory Second Battle: Georgian victory

Belligerents
First Republic of Armenia	Democratic Republic of Georgia

Commanders and leaders
Drastamat Kanayan; Col. Korolkov	Varden Tsulukidze (Note: First battle); Giorgi Mazniashvili (Note: Second battle)

Strength
Armenian right flank (Note: First battle)	3,500-man battle group (Note: Second battle)

Casualties and losses
Unknown amount affected by a typhus outbreak (Note: First battle); ~200 killed or wounded (Note: Second battle)	Unknown

The Battles for Shulaveri (or Shulavery) were strategic engagements during the Armeno-Georgian War, taking place in December 1918.

== Background ==
Following the capture of Sanahin, Hairum, and Akhtala between December 14 and 17, the Georgian forces under General Varden Tsulukidze were in a state of rapid retreat. By December 18, the Georgians had been driven back along the entire front toward Sadakhlo. Armenian commander Drastamat Kanayan, aiming to incorporate the Borchalu uezd up to the Khram River, ordered his right flank to push northward while skirting the main Georgian concentration at Sadakhlo.

== The first battle ==
=== Military operations ===
On December 20, 1918, the Armenian right flank, commanded by Colonel Korolkov, successfully bypassed the Georgian forces entrenched at Sadakhlo. They struck and captured the "friendly village" of Shulaver, whose inhabitants were supportive of the Armenian advance.

The capture of Shulaver allowed the Armenian regular army to approach the Khram River, which served as a major geographic objective. Simultaneously, Armenian forces attained the town of Belyi-Kliuch in the Tiflis uezd. By achieving these positions, the Armenian military had come within 45 versts (approximately 30 miles) of the Georgian capital.

=== Aftermath ===
The Armenian offensive reached its climax on December 25, mere kilometers from Tiflis, the same day that Georgian airplanes were deployed for the first time to bomb Armenian positions near Shulaver. By this time, the momentum of the Armenian drive had slowed due to the lack of reinforcements and an outbreak of typhus in the ranks.

The strategic situation shifted during the last week of December as the Georgians consolidated their regulars and the People's Guard near Tiflis. This reorganization led to a major Georgian counteroffensive on December 28, known as the Second Battle of Shulaver, in which General Giorgi Mazniev led a 3,500-man battle group to retrieve the village and drive the Armenians back toward the Lori district.

== The second battle ==
=== Military operations ===
On the morning of December 28, 1918, General Mazniashvili ordered a 3,500-man battle group into a full-scale attack against Armenian positions at Shulaver. The Georgian offensive was supported by the arrival of a thousand additional troops and the use of airplanes, which had first been deployed on December 25 to bomb Armenian positions.

By nightfall, the Georgian battle group had successfully retrieved Shulaver and several smaller neighboring villages. The engagement resulted in nearly two hundred Armenian casualties, marking the first major victory for the Georgian side in the conflict.

== Aftermath ==
The recapture of Shulaver shifted the focus of the war back toward the strategic village and station of Sadakhlo. For the next two days, both armies engaged in a "brisk contest" for Sadakhlo, which changed hands several times before the midnight ceasefire on December 31.

Although the Georgians had retrieved Shulaver, the Armenian army remained entrenched in the southern reaches of the Borchalu uezd and the Lori district until the Allied-imposed withdrawal in early January 1919.
