= Armed Forces of Armenia =

Combined military forces of Armenia

- Հայաստանի զինված ուժեր
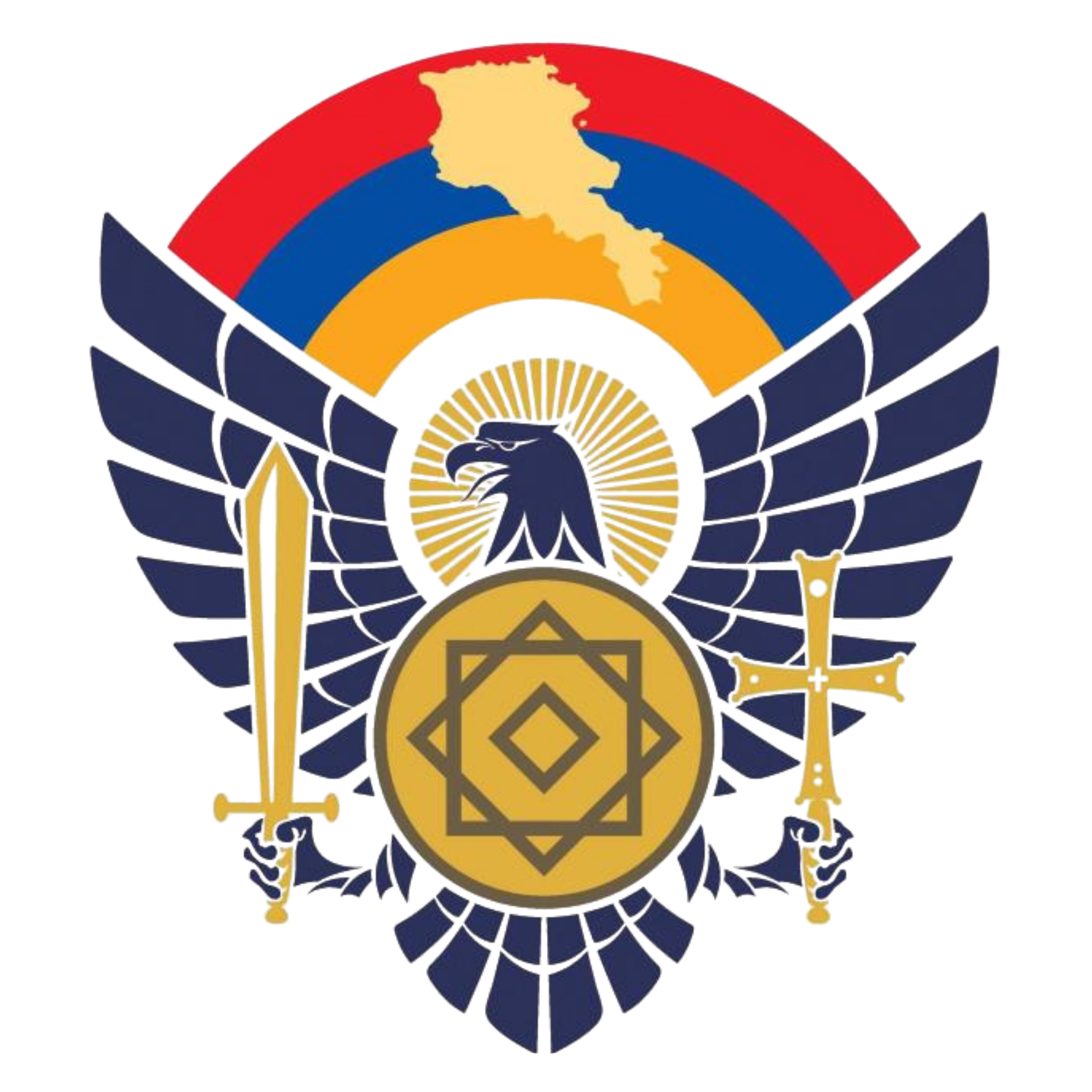
- Emblem of the Armenian Armed Forces
- Founded: 28 May 1918; 108 years ago
- Current form: 28 January 1992; 34 years ago
- Service branches: Armenian Ground Forces; Armenian Air Force
- Headquarters: Yerevan
- Website: mil.am

Leadership
- Commander-in-Chief: Prime Minister Nikol Pashinyan
- Minister of Defence: Suren Papikyan
- Chief of the General Staff: Lieutenant General Edvard Asryan

Personnel
- Military age: 18–30
- Conscription: 18 months
- Active personnel: 55,000 active personnel (IISS estimate)
- Reserve personnel: 210,000 former service personnel with service in last 15 years
- Deployed personnel: Kosovo (58 in KFOR); Lebanon (33 in UNIFIL)

Expenditure
- Budget: $1.70 billion (2027 estimate); Percent of GDP= 4.5% (est. 2027)

Industry
- Domestic suppliers: Davaro, Arsenal, IDS Armenia
- Foreign suppliers: Russia; India; France; China; Iran; United States; Bulgaria; Serbia; Ukraine; Belarus

Related articles
- History: Military history of Armenia; 1918–1920 Armenian-Azerbaijani War; 1918 Armenian-Georgian War; 1920 Turkish–Armenian War; 1920 Red Army invasion of Armenia; 1921 February Uprising; 1988–1994 First Nagorno-Karabakh War; 2020 Second Nagorno-Karabakh War; Armenian political crisis (2020-present); 2022 Kazakh unrest September 2022 Armenia–Azerbaijan clashes
- Ranks: Military ranks of Armenia

The Armed Forces of the Republic of Armenia (Armenian: Հայաստանի Հանրապետության զինված ուժեր, romanized: Hayastani Hanrapetut’yan zinvats uzher, abbreviated ՀՀ ԶՈՒ, HH ZU), sometimes referred to as the Armenian Army (հայկական բանակ, haykakan banak), is the national military of Armenia. It consists of personnel branches under the General Staff of the Armenian Armed Forces, which can be divided into two general branches: the Ground Forces, and the Air Force. Although it was partially formed out of the former Soviet Army forces stationed in the Armenian SSR (mostly units of the 7th Guards Army of the Transcaucasian Military District), the military of Armenia can be traced back to the founding of the First Republic of Armenia in 1918. Being landlocked, Armenia does not have a navy.

The Supreme Commander-in-Chief of the military is the Prime Minister of Armenia, Nikol Pashinyan. The Ministry of Defence is in charge of political leadership, headed by Suren Papikyan, while military command remains in the hands of the general staff, headed by the Chief of Staff, who is Lieutenant-General Edvard Asryan. Border guards subject to the Ministry of Defence until 2001, patrol Armenia's borders with Georgia and Azerbaijan, while Russian troops continue to monitor its borders with Iran and Turkey. Since 2002, Armenia has been a member of the Collective Security Treaty Organization. As of 2026, Armenia is undergoing a top-to-bottom transformation of its Armed Forces to build a modern military.

== History ==
=== Early Armenian Army ===
An Armenian military corps was established to fight against the Ottomans during the Turkish–Armenian War in early 1918. In accordance with the Treaty of Batum of 4 June 1918 the Ottoman Empire demobilized most of the Armenian army. Ethnic Armenian conscripts and volunteers in the Imperial Russian Army would later become the core of the military of the First Armenian Republic.

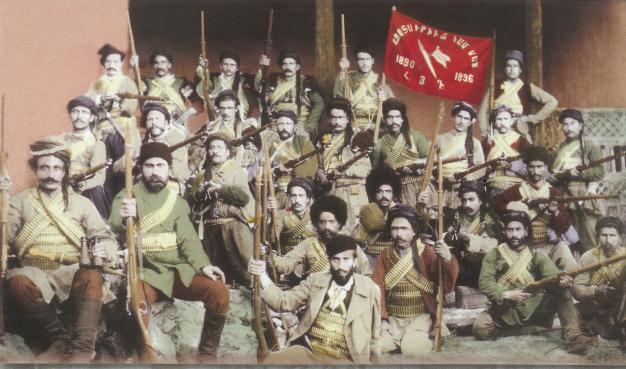
An Armenian fedayi group fighting under the Armenian Revolutionary Federation banner, ca. 1890s

=== Soviet era ===
The 7th Guards Army was based in Yerevan from 1946 to 1992. In the late 1980s the Army consisted of:

- Directorate – Yerevan
- 15th Motor Rifle Division – Kirovakan (now Vanadzor)
- 75th Motor Rifle Division – Nakhichevan
- 127th Motor Rifle Division – Leninakan (now Gyumri)
- 164th Motor Rifle Division – Yerevan

On 1 June 1992, ITAR-TASS reported that General Fyodor Reut said that some units of the 7th Guards Army would begin leaving Armenia in 10–15 days. The army was disbanded later that summer. The former Soviet Air Defense Forces in Armenia were drawn from the 14th Air Defense Corps of the 19th Separate Air Defense Army.

=== 1988–1992 ===
The modern Armenian military entered its first stage at the beginning of the Nagorno-Karabakh conflict, when Armenian militias were formed to combat Azerbaijani units in Artsakh. On 20 September 1990, the first military unit was created, the Yerevan Special Regiment, with the first oath being held in the Republican Assembly Point and was attended by the first President of Armenia Levon Ter-Petrosyan, Prime Minister Vazgen Manukyan, and defence minister Vazgen Sargsyan. Five battalions were also formed in Ararat, Goris, Vardenis, Ijan and Meghri. In 1991, by the decision of the government, the State Committee of Defense under the Council of Ministers, which facilitated the task of coordinating the defense operations of Armenia, becoming the basis on which the Ministry of Defense was to be established later on.

=== 1992–2020 ===
Armenia established a Ministry of Defence on 28 January 1992. The first military unit of the defence ministry to be formed was the 1st Airborne Regiment, where the first Armenian soldier took the oath to the nation that March. Since a significant part of the officers of the Armed Forces were fighters of the self-defense volunteer detachments, a center for raising the qualification of officers was established for their qualification and training, which during its activity it provided about 1,500 officer-graduates. The School of Non-Commissioned Officers produced about 1,000 graduates.

The Treaty on Conventional Armed Forces in Europe was ratified by the Armenian parliament in July 1992. The treaty establishes comprehensive limits on key categories of military equipment, such as tanks, artillery, armored combat vehicles, combat aircraft, and combat helicopters, and provides for the destruction of weaponry in excess of those limits. Armenian officials have consistently expressed determination to comply with its provisions and thus Armenia has provided data on armaments as required under the CFE Treaty. Despite this, Azerbaijan accuses Armenia of diverting a large part of its military forces to Nagorno-Karabakh and thus circumventing these international regulations. In March 1993, Armenia signed the multilateral Chemical Weapons Convention, which calls for the eventual elimination of chemical weapons. Armenia acceded to the nuclear Non-Proliferation Treaty as a non-nuclear weapons state in July 1993.

In addition to the branches of services listed above, Armenia established its own Internal Troops from the former Soviet Interior Troops after the dissolution of the Soviet Union. Up until December 2002, Armenia maintained a Ministry of Internal Affairs, but along with the Ministry of National Security, it was reorganized as a non-ministerial institution. The two organizations became the Police of Armenia and the National Security Service. Armenia signed a military cooperation plan with Lebanon on 27 November 2015.

=== 2020–present ===
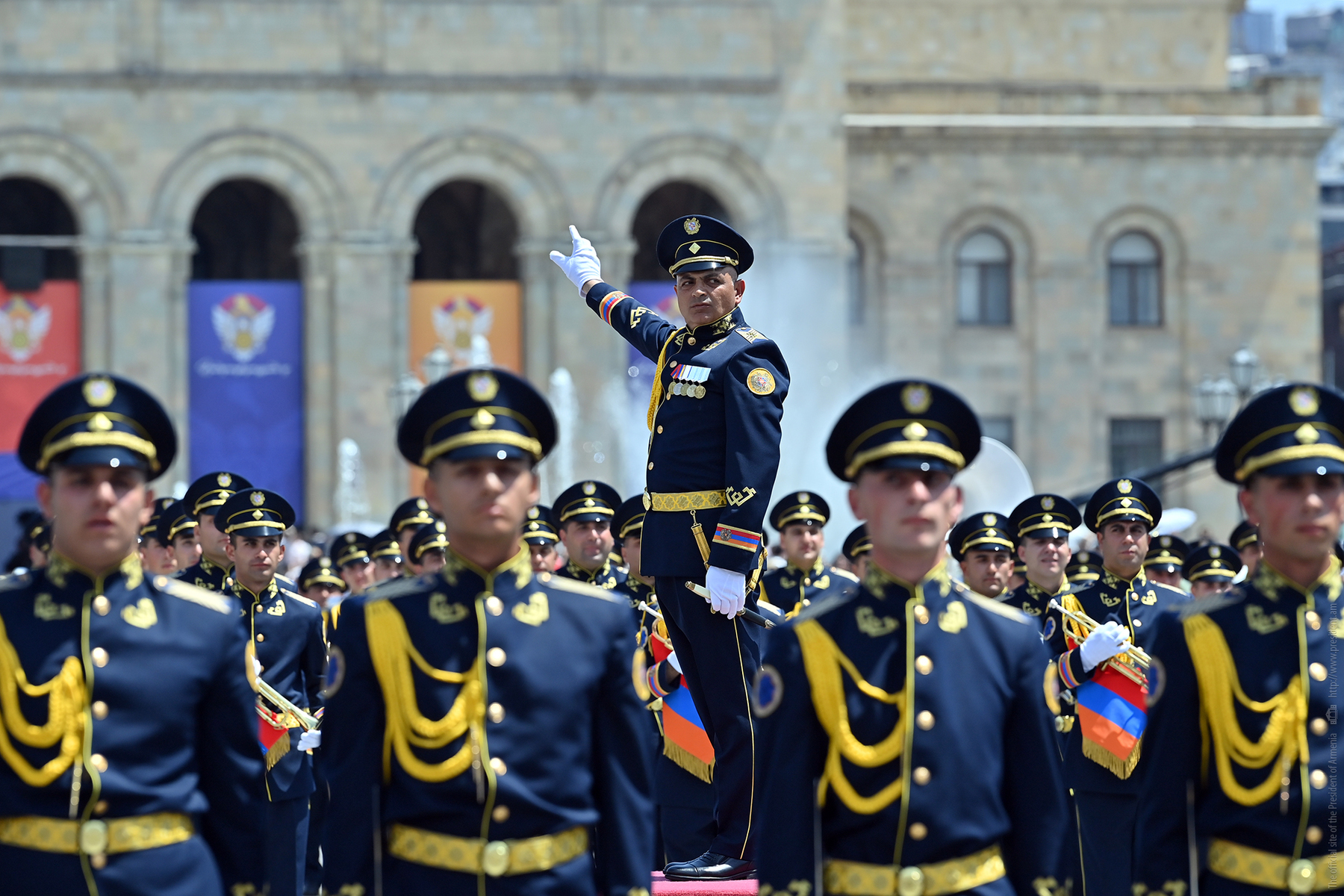
Honorary Guard of the Armenian Armed Forces on the 2026 military parade

On the 2026 Republic Day military parade, Prime Minister Nikol Pashinyan presented the "new army of the Republic of Armenia", including "new weapons, new uniforms and a new ideology". He emphasized that the only task of the army was the defense of the internationally recognized sovereign territory of the country.

== Organization and service branches ==
The Armenian Armed Forces are Headquartered in Yerevan, where most of the general staff is based. The general staff is responsible for operational command of the Armenian Military and its two major branches. The armed forces also has the following personnel branches:

- Department of Military Preparedness
- Department of Military Apparatus
- Department of Aviation
- Department of Missile Troops
- Department of Air Defence
- Department of Rear Services
- Department of Signal Troops
- Department of the Engineer Troops
- Department of Armaments
- Department of the RNBC Defence Troops
- Medical Department
- Personnel Department
- Intelligence Department
- Strategic Planning Department
- Mobilization Department
- Operative Department
- Department of Military Service Security
- Department of Military Commissars
- Financial Department
- Human Resources Department

=== Ground Forces ===
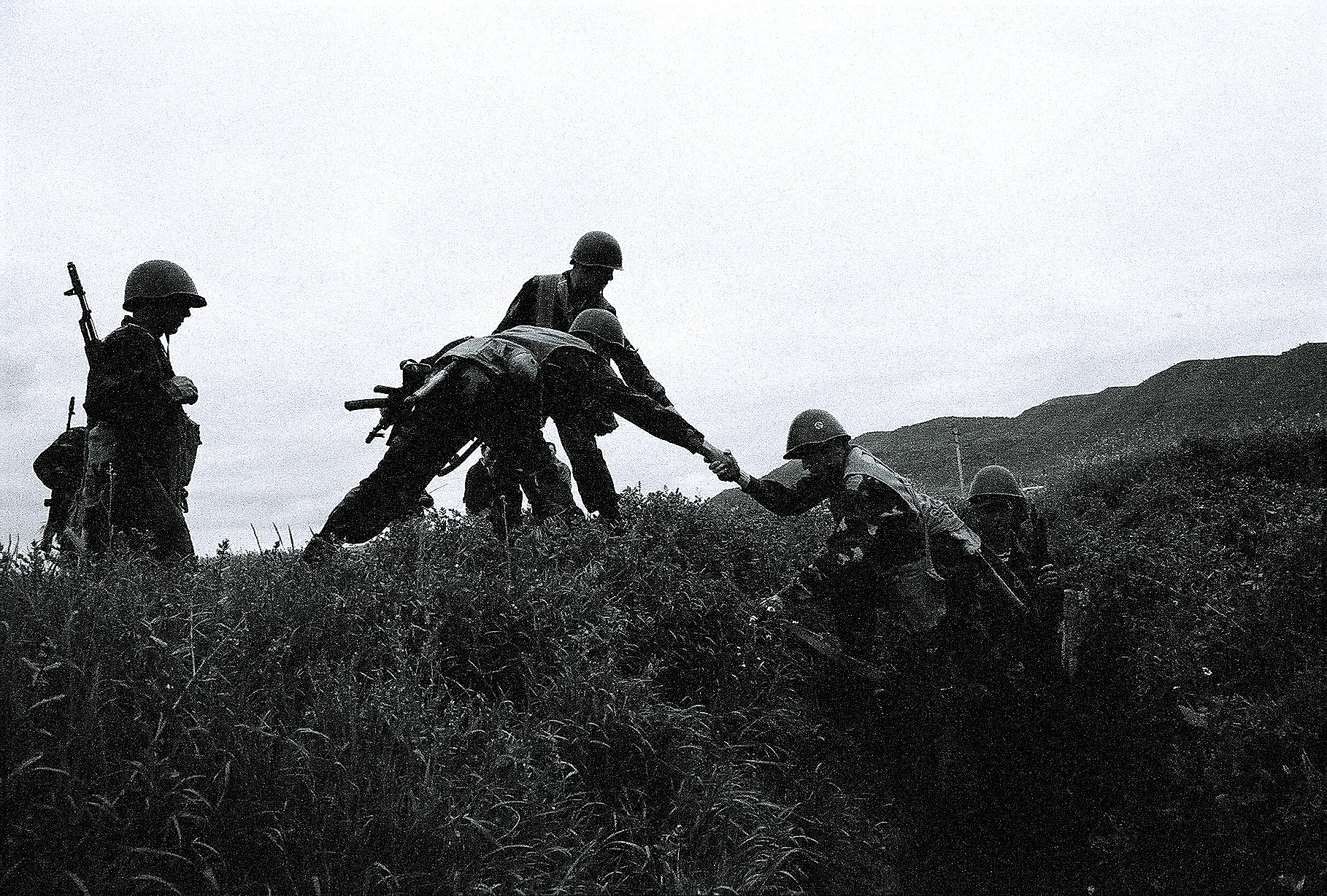
Armenian soldiers in the Nagorno-Karabakh conflict

Snipers during a field exercise (2004)

According to IISS 2010, Armenia has 30 T-80 tanks, 390 T-72 tanks, 14 T-54/55 tanks and 80 BMP-1, 7 BMP-1K, 55 BMP-2 and 12 BRM-1K. Wheeled APCs reported included 11 BTR-60s, 21 BTR-70s, 4 BTR-80s, 145 MT-LBs, 5 BMD-1S, and 120 BRDM-2 scout vehicles.

Although the Russians have supplied newer equipment to Armenia over the years, the numbers have never been sufficient to upgrade all ground force formations and many of the lower readiness units still have older, Soviet-legacy systems that have not been upgraded or in many cases effectively maintained. These older systems are placing great demands on the logistics system for service, maintenance, replacement parts and necessary upgrades, costing the army both financially and in overall readiness. The ground force is engaged in an effort of reassessment, reorganisation and restructuring, as the future of Armenia's defence needs a revised force structure and unit mix. The army sees the need to maintain much of its traditional mechanised formations, but is looking to lighten and make more mobile and self-sustainable a small number of other formations. It must develop these newer formations to support its international requirements and effectively operate in mountainous and other rugged terrain, but it must do this without affecting the mechanised capability that is needed to confront Azerbaijan's conventional forces.

Since the fall of the Soviet Union, Armenia has followed a policy of developing its armed forces into a professional, well trained, and mobile military. In 2000, the Centre for International Studies and Research reported that at that time the Armenian Army had the strongest combat capability of the three South Caucasus countries' armies (the other two being Georgia and Azerbaijan). CSTO Secretary, Nikolay Bordyuzha, came to a similar conclusion after collective military drills in 2007 when he stated that, "the Armenian Army is the most efficient one in the post-Soviet space". This was echoed more recently by Igor Korotchenko, a member of the Public Council, Russian Ministry of Defense, in a March 2011 interview with Voice of Russia radio.

The Army is functionally divided into Active and Reserve Forces. Their main functions include deterrence, defense, peace support and crisis management, humanitarian and rescue missions, as well as social functions within Armenian society.

The Active Forces mainly have peacekeeping and defensive duties, and are further divided into Deployment Forces, Immediate Reaction, and Main Defense Forces. The Reserve Forces consists of Enhancement Forces, Territorial Defense Forces, and Training Grounds. They deal with planning and reservist preparation, armaments and equipment storage, training of formations for active forces rotation or increase in personnel.

During peacetime the Army maintains permanent combat and mobilization readiness. They become part of multinational military formations in compliance with international treaties Armenia is a signatory to, participate in the preparation of the population, the national economy and the maintenance of wartime reserves and the infrastructure of the country for defense.

In times of crisis the Army's main tasks relate to participation in operations countering terrorist activities and defense of strategic facilities (such as nuclear power plants and major industrial facilities), assisting the security forces in proliferation of weapons of mass destruction, illegal armaments traffic and international terrorism.

In case of low- and medium-intensity military conflict the Active Forces that are part of the Army participate in carrying out the initial tasks for the defense of the territorial integrity and sovereignty of the country. In case of a high intensity conflict the Land Forces, together with the Air Force, Air Defense and Border Guards, form the defense group of the Armenian Armed Forces aiming at countering aggression and protect the territorial integrity and sovereignty of the country.

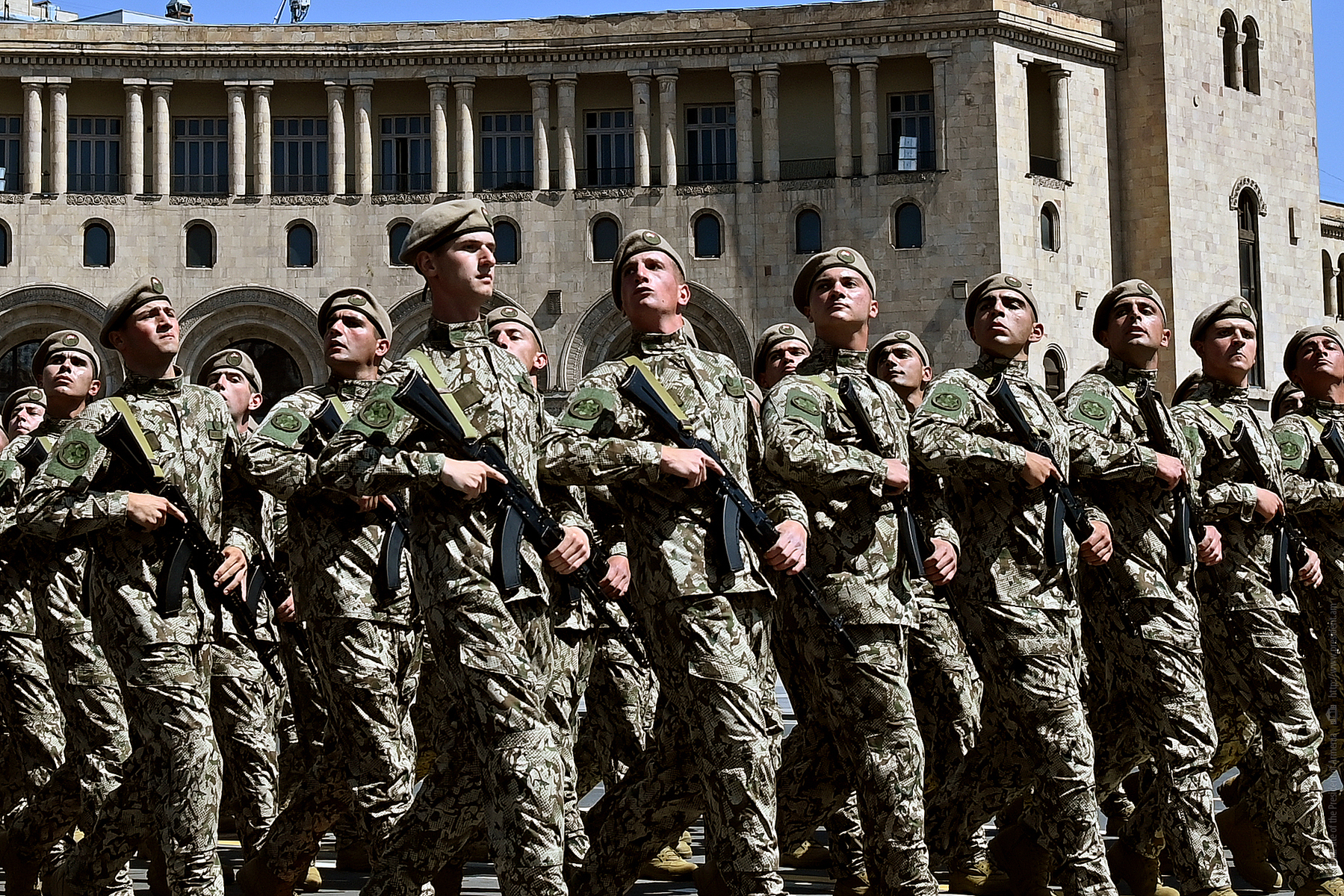
Armenian soldiers during the 2026 military parade

Experiments in developing small arms have been undertaken in Armenia, producing the K-3 assault rifle, but Jane's Infantry Weapons estimates that the program has ceased, and the rifle is not in widespread service with the army. The AK-74 is the standard-issue rifle of the Armenian Army with older AKMs in reserve use. Beside AK rifles Armenian forces use mostly Russian small arms like the Makarov pistol, SVD sniper rifle, and the PKM general purpose machine gun.

=== Air Force and Air Defense ===
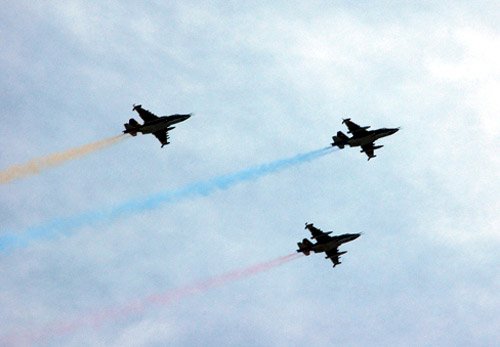
Armenian Air Force Su-25's during a military parade in Yerevan

The Armenian Air Force consists of 15 Su-25 ground attack planes, 4 Su-30 jet fighters, 1 Mig 25, 16 Mil Mi-24 helicopter gunships, 6 L-39 trainer and attack aircraft, 16 Yak-52 trainer aircraft, 3 Il-76 cargo planes, 18 Mil Mi-8 transport helicopters, and 10 Mil Mi-2 light utility helicopters. There are an additional 18 MiG-29 fighter jets of the Russian 102nd Military Base stationed in Gyumri.

The Armenian anti-aircraft branch was equipped and organized as part of the military reform program of Lieutenant-General Norat Ter-Grigoryants. It consists of an anti-aircraft missile brigade and two regiments armed with 100 anti-aircraft complexes of various models and modifications, including the SA-8, Krug, S-75, S-125, SA-7, SA-10, SA-13, SA-16 and SA-18. Russia has SA-6 and S-300 long range surface-to-air missiles at the Russian 102nd Military Base. There are also 24 Scud ballistic missiles with eight launchers. Numerical strength is estimated at 3,000 servicemen, with plans for further expansion.

In late December 2010, the Armenian Defense Minister, Seyran Ohanyan, officially acknowledged that the army are equipped with the Russian-made S-300 surface-to-air missiles. The statement was made while the Minister was inspecting a new air-defense command point that maintains "state-of-the-art equipment" built specifically for the operation of the S-300s. Russian specialists started to train Armenian teams on sophisticated Missiles and Defensive Systems. The S-300 was paraded for the first time in the 2011 Parade and the only S-300 missile system (SA10 Grumble) which likes mobility. The S-300 is the main air defense system that protects Armenia's air security. In the 2016 Armenian Parade celebrating the Armenian Independence BUK-M1-2 Air Defense Systems were shown. These systems were not part of the 200 million dollar contract agreement between Yerevan and Moscow but an agreement between CSTO partners. Other devices such as stem of electronic warfare (EW) "Infauna" and P-325U consist in the Armenian Armed Forces.

=== Territorial Defense Forces ===
The armed forces also sport the following volunteer units:

- Sisakan Regiment
- Erato Detachment
- Vanadzor Volunteer Detachment
- Homeland Detachment
- ARF Battalion
- Tigran the Great International Military Regiment

== Personnel ==
The Armed Forces of Armenia is constitutionally a conscript force, but there is also a growing number of professional officers. There were roughly 19,000 conscripts and 23,000 professionals serving in 2017. Enlistment, which is performed twice a year, is handled by military commissariats. Male draftees between the ages of 18 and 27 are obliged to present themselves in the commissariats for registration. People who have changed their citizenship or have dual citizenship are also subject to conscription, unless they have already served in the armed forces of another country. Since 2003, conscientious objectors can apply for alternative service. Draft evaders can not be appointed to public service positions. Citizens who have completed military service are registered in the reserve and are divided into rank and file, non-commissioned and commissioned staff of the reserve. Reservists can be called up to training musters and exercises in peacetime. Reserve obligation lasts up to the age of 50.

=== Education ===
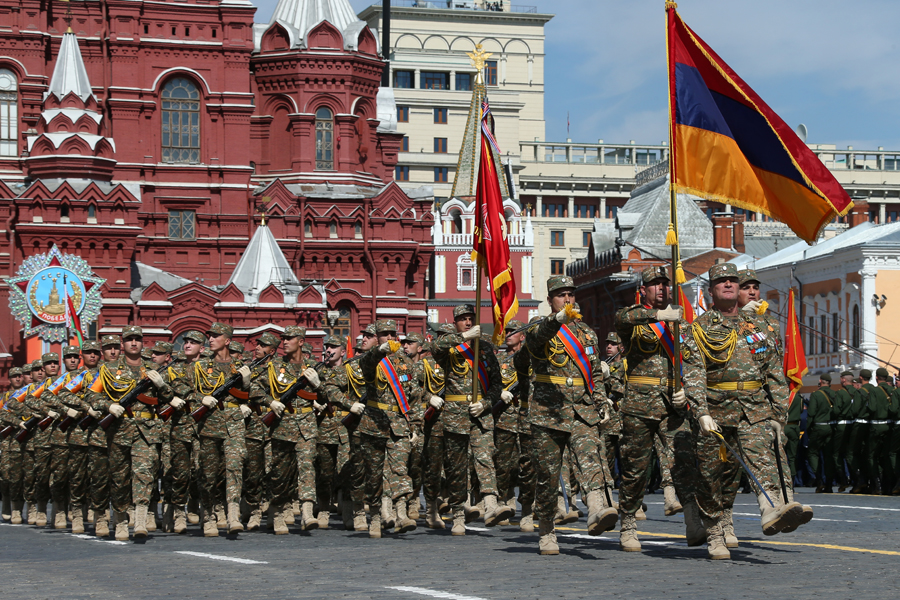
Contingent from the Armed Forces of Armenia on Red Square in 2015.

- National Defense Research University (established in 2016, on the basis of the Institute for National Strategic Studies)
- Vazgen Sargsyan Military Academy
- Yerevan State Medical University Military Faculty
- Monte Melkonian Military College (secondary education)
- Foreign institutions for Armenian soldiers
  - Military Academy of Modena
  - École spéciale militaire de Saint-Cyr
  - Hellenic Military Academy
  - Military University of the Ministry of Defense of the Russian Federation—College of Military Finance

The I Have the Honour State Program is an educational program of the ministry of defence that serves conscripts in the army. Participants of the program are given the right to defer conscription in favor of education in post-secondary institutions with full reimbursement of tuition fees, after which the conscript is awarded the rank of lieutenant and is appointed to the service for a period of 2 years and 3 months.

=== Contract service ===
A contractual military service is a service last for 3–12 months, or for a term of three or five years. Males under 36 who have not previously served as contract servicemen and are registered in the reserve, can be enrolled in contractual military service as privates. Felons and those not fit for service are ineligible for contract service. Since 2008, sergeant training courses for contract servicemen have operated in the Armed Forces and since 2013, the duration of the courses has three months. The courses are open to reservist privates under the age of 25.

=== Conscription ===
Military service in Armenia is mandatory. Citizens aged 27 to 50 are registered in the reserve and may be drafted if a national mobilization was declared. The enlistment process is handled by the military commissariats in January and May. Dual citizens are not exempt from the draft. If one fails to follow through with their obligations, a criminal case is then instituted, which could lead to 3 years in jail.

The following military commissariats operate in Armenia:

- Yerevan
  - Conscription and Mobilization Service
  - No.1 territorial subdivision
  - No.2 Territorial Subdivision
  - No.3 Territorial Subdivision
  - No.4 Territorial Subdivision
- Ashtarak
  - Aragatsotn Regional Subdivision
- Artashat
  - Ararat Regional Subdivision
- Armavir
  - Armavir Regional Subdivision
- Martuni
  - Gegharkunik Regional Subdivision
- Abovyan
  - Kotayk Regional Subdivision
- Vanadzor
  - Lori Regional Subdivision
- Gyumri
  - Shirak Regional Subdivision
- Goris
  - Syunik Regional Subdivision
- Ijevan
  - Tavush Regional Subdivision
- Yeghegnadzor
  - Vayots Dzor Province Regional Subdivision

=== Women in the armed forces ===
During the First Nagorno-Karabakh War in the early 90s, at least 115 Armenian women were known to have taken part in combat operations. Many women from the diaspora arrived to serve in non-combat missions. The first woman to have been given a significant position in the military was Zhanna Galstyan, who was appointed deputy commander of the Central District Defensive Unit after the formation of the Artsakh Defense Army.

More than 2,000 women currently serve in the army, with most working in administrative positions or in liaison and medical units. In October 2016, a program, approved by the National Assembly, committed the military to "creating additional opportunities" for women serving in the army or seeking military service. Defense Minister Vigen Sargsyan at the time told the MPs that "It would be wrong not to let them (women) reach their full potential." The Erato Detachment was the first all-women military unit in the Armenian Armed Forces, being created after of clashes between the Azerbaijani Army and Armenia occurred in July 2020. Anna Hakobyan, the wife of the current Prime Minister of Armenia, Nikol Pashinyan, underwent a week long combat readiness program with women from the Republic of Artsakh who joined the unit.

=== Minorities ===
During the 2020 war, a group of Yazidi reservists formed a reserve military unit that joined the frontline in Karabakh. The unit was led by Rzgan Sarhangyan and is composed of 50 soldiers aged between 18 and 55.

=== Awards and badges ===
Awards and decorations are military medals and ribbons of the armed forces which are currently issued under the authority of the Ministry of Defense. The current active awards and decorations of the armed forces are as follows:

Award	Ribbon	Medal	Awarded by	Notes
Order of Tigran the Great			Government of Armenia	
Order of the Combat Cross			Government of Armenia	
Medal "For Courage"			Government of Armenia	
Medal "For Merit to the Fatherland" («Հայրենիքին մատուցած ծառայությունների համար» մեդալ)			Government of Armenia	
Admiral Isakov Medal (Ադմիրալ Իսակով" մեդալ)			Government of Armenia	
Medal "For Military Merit" (Մարտական ծառայության մեդալ)			Government of Armenia	It was established on July 26, 1993.
Medal for Combat Service			Government of Armenia	
Medal "For Impeccable Service"			Ministry of Defence of Armenia	
Medal of Marshal Baghramyan			Ministry of Defence of Armenia	
Medal of Drastamat Kanayan			Ministry of Defence of Armenia	
Medal of Vazgen Sargsyan			Ministry of Defence of Armenia	
Medal of Andranik Ozanyan			Ministry of Defence of Armenia	
Jubilee Medal "20 Years of the Armed Forces of the Republic of Armenia"			Ministry of Defence of Armenia	

== Symbols ==
=== Motto ===
The primary unofficial motto for the Armenian military is "Homeland, Honor, and Dedication" (Armenian: Հայրենիկ, Պատիվ, Նվիրվում, romanized: Hayrenik, Pativ, Nvirvum).

=== Emblem ===
Before Republic Day in 2026, the current emblem of the armed forces was introduced. The current emblem consists of the following:

- Eagle: Symbolizes vitality, combat spirit, and vigilance.
- Golden Sun: Positioned behind the eagle to represent eternity, light, and the enduring nature of the Armenian people.
- Shield amd Seed: Placed on the eagle's chest, featuring an eight-pointed sun cross and a central seed, symbolizing protection and the future generation of soldiers.Weapons: The eagle holds a golden sword in its left talon and the sacred cross of Ashot II the Iron in its right.
- Flag of Armenia and Map: Positioned at the top as a unified whole, anchoring the emblem to Armenia's sovereignty and territorial integrity.
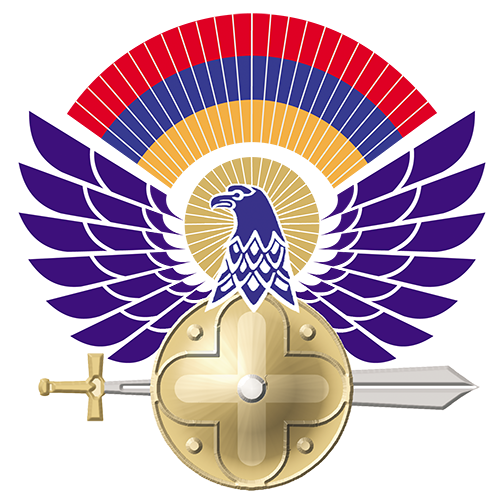
Emblem (2001-2026)

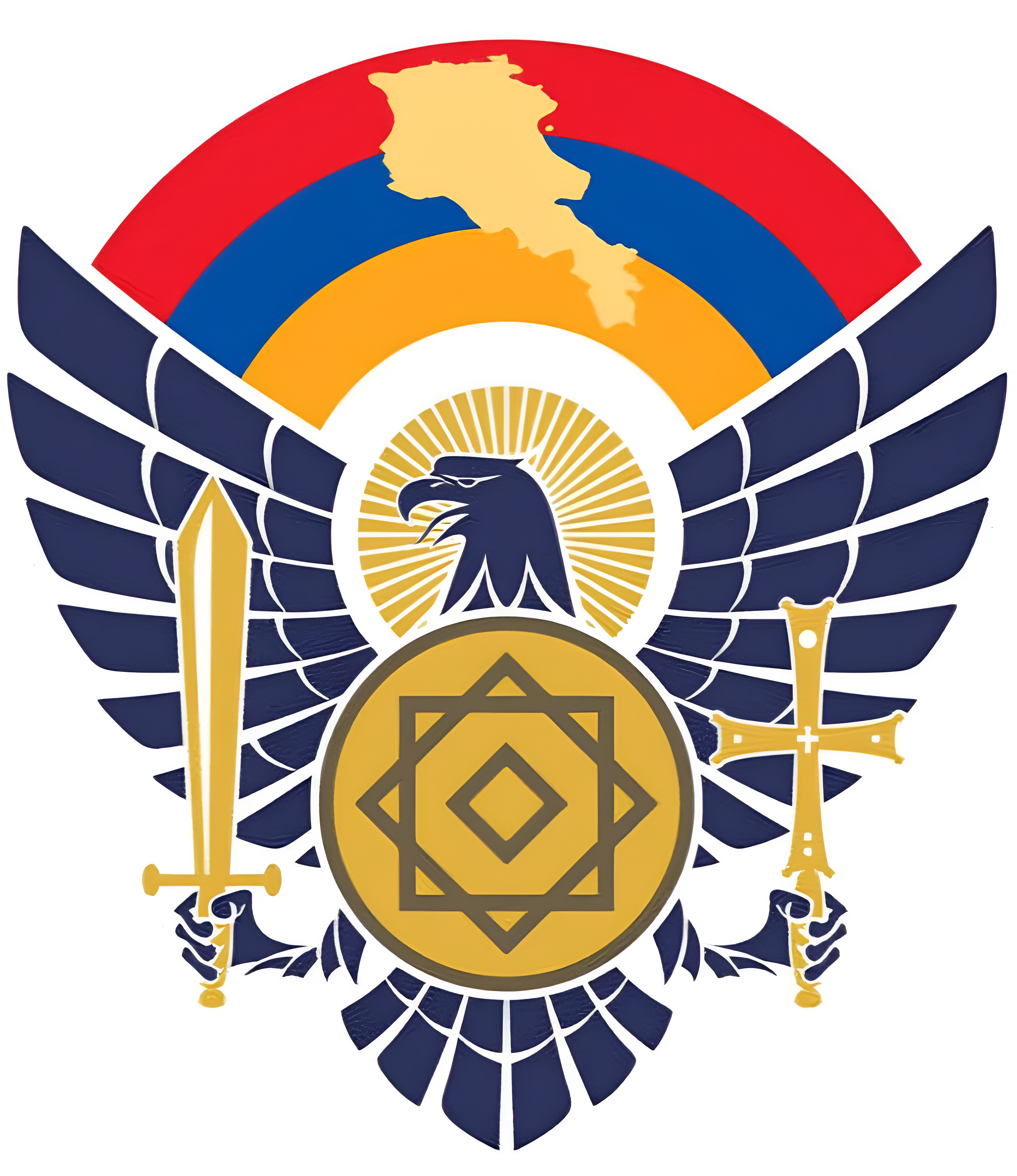
Emblem (2026–present)

=== Ashot of Iron Banner ===
In 2012, on the occasion of the 20th anniversary of the Armed Forces of Armenia, the cross that King Ashot II the Iron of Armenia is said to have carried into battle with him was declared the "Guardian of the Armenian Army" by Catholicos of All Armenians Karekin II. During the Armenian Independence Day parade in 2016 and Republic Day parade in 2026, honor guards posted the flag of King Ashot II the Iron before the parade proceedings. It currently serves as an official symbol of the armed forces.

== Equipment ==
The Armenian Army operates a wide variety of older equipment, mostly of Soviet origin. There is also some newer equipment from Russia. In 2015, a US$200m loan was ratified by Russia for the purchase of modern weapons between 2015 and 2017. Armenia produces its own combat helmets and body armors through the works of a joint Armenian-Polish company. Some personal equipment used by special units (Future Assault Shell Technology helmets, plate carriers and special pouches) is imported. Armenia also produces most of its small arms, with only specialised units being imported.

Following the 2016 Nagorno-Karabakh clashes, the Helsinki Citizens' Assembly released a report, which detailed the circumstances of the deaths of Armenian servicemen. Among the contributing factors were stated to be malfunctioning equipment and lack of necessary materiel, especially ammunition. This was followed by plans to increase Armenian defense spending to purchase more weapons and ammunition.

Armenia is not a significant exporter of conventional weapons, but it has provided support, including material, to the Armenians of Nagorno-Karabakh during the Nagorno-Karabakh conflict.

== International military cooperation ==
=== Russia ===
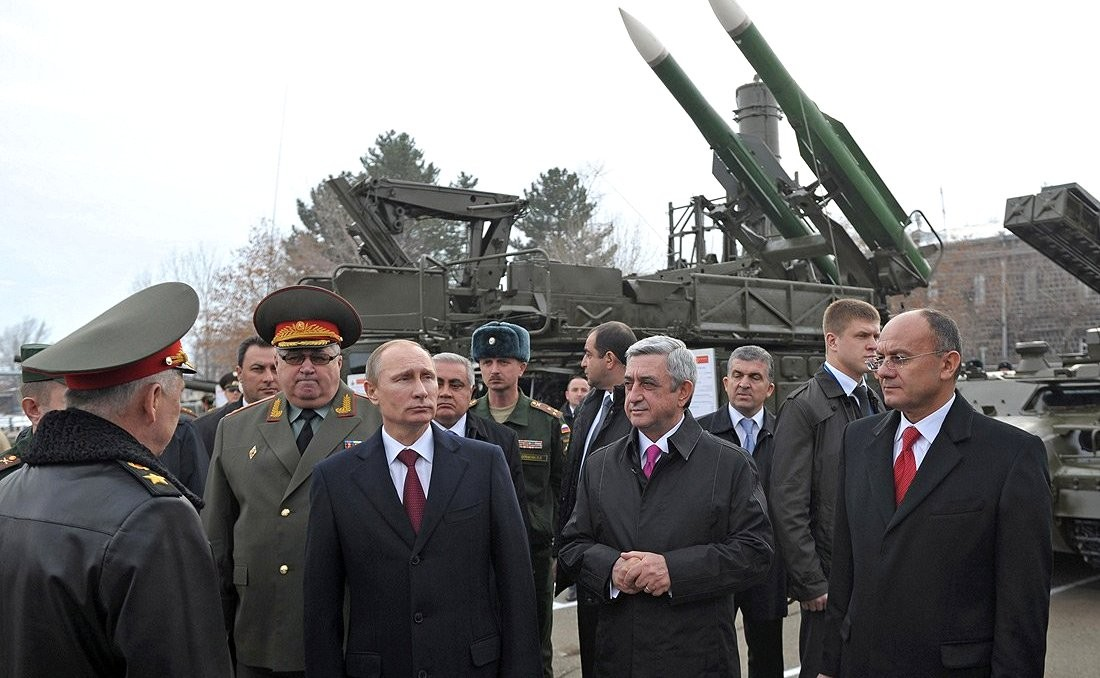
Vladimir Putin during his visit to the 102nd Russian military base in Armenia.

Russia is one of the closest allies of Armenia. The Russian 102nd Military Base, the former 127th Motor Rifle Division, is stationed in Gyumri. The military alliance of the two nations and, in particular, the presence of Russian troops on Armenian soil has been a key element of Armenia's national security doctrine since Armenia gained independence in 1991. Russia stations an estimated 5,000 soldiers of all types in Armenia, including 3,000 officially reported to be based at the 102nd Military Base. In 1997, the two countries signed a far-reaching friendship treaty, which calls for mutual assistance in the event of a military threat to either party and allows Russian border guards to patrol Armenia's frontiers with Turkey and Iran. In early 2005, the 102nd Military Base had 74 tanks, 17 battle infantry vehicles, 148 armored personnel carriers, 84 artillery pieces, 18 MiG-29 fighters, one battery of SA-6 and two batteries of S-300 anti-aircraft missiles. However, in 2005–2007, following an agreement on the withdrawal of two Russian military bases from Georgia, a great deal of military hardware was moved to the 102nd Base from the Russian 12th Military Base in Batumi and the 62nd Military Base at Akhalkalaki, Georgia. Russia also supplies weapons at the relatively lower prices of the Russian domestic market as part of a collective security agreement since January 2004.

According to unconfirmed reports by the Azeri media, Russia has supplied $1 billion worth of arms and ammunitions to Armenia in 1996; and handed over an additional $800 million worth of arms to Armenia in 2008–2009. According to AzerNews, the weapons in this latest transfer include 21 tanks, 12 armored vehicles, five other battle machines, a great number of rocket launchers, over 1,050 cases of grenades, nearly 7,900 types of ammunition, 120 grenade launchers, over 4,000 sub-machine guns, TNT fuses, mines of various types, 14 mine-launchers, 9 Grad launchers, five cannons, and other weapons.

Officer training is another sphere of Russian-Armenian military cooperation. In the first years of sovereignty when Armenia lacked a military educational establishment of its own, officers of its army were trained in Russia. Even now when Armenia has a military college on its own territory, the Armenian officer corps honors the tradition and is trained at Russian military educational establishments. In 1997, 600 Armenian servicemen were being trained at Russian Military Academies: the training was conducted by the Marshal Bagramyan Training Brigade.

At the first meeting of the joint Russian-Armenian government panel for military-technical cooperation that took place during autumn 2005, Prime Minister Mikhail Fradkov reported that, Russian factories will participate in the Armenian program of military modernization, and that Russia is prepared to supply the necessary spare parts and equipment. In accordance with this agreement, Armenia and Russia agreed to work together in exporting weapons and other military equipment to third countries in December 2009. The export agreement was signed by Defense Minister Seyran Ohanyan and a visiting senior Russian official, Konstantin Biryulin, during a meeting of a Russian-Armenian inter-governmental commission on bilateral military-technical cooperation. The agreement envisages the two countries' interaction in exporting military production to third countries, which will help to strengthen the armed forces of the two states, and further cement the already close Russian–Armenian military cooperation.

A Russian-Armenian defense agreement signed in August 2010 extends Russia's military presence in Armenia till 2044 and commits Russia to supplying Armenia with modern and compatible weaponry and special military hardware at reduced prices.

At the beginning of 2009, Azerbaijani media published allegations that Russia had made extensive weapons transfers to Armenia throughout 2008 costing about $800 million. On 12 January 2009, the Russian ambassador was invited to the Azerbaijani Ministry of Foreign Affairs and asked about this information. On 21 January 2009, Russian ministry of foreign relations officially denied the transfers. According to US diplomatic cables leaked in December 2010, Azerbaijani defence minister Safar Abiyev claimed that in January 2009 during his visit to Moscow, his Russian counterpart Anatoly Serdyukov unofficially had admitted to weapons transfers "after the second bottle of vodka" that evening, although officially it was denied.

In June 2013 it was revealed that Russia has deployed in Armenia several Iskander-M ballistic missiles systems, which are stationed at undisclosed locations in the country.

=== Collective Security Treaty Organisation ===
On 7 October 2002, the Presidents of Armenia, Belarus, Kazakhstan, Kyrgyzstan, Russia and Tajikistan, signed a charter in Tashkent, founding the Collective Security Treaty Organisation (CSTO) (Russian: Организация Договора о Коллективной Безопасности (ОДКБ/ODKB)) or simply Ташкентский договор (The Tashkent Treaty). Nikolai Bordyuzha was appointed secretary general of the new organisation. On 23 June 2006, Uzbekistan became a full participant in the CSTO and its membership was formally ratified by its parliament on 28 March 2008. Furthermore, the CSTO is an observer organisation at the United Nations General Assembly.

The charter reaffirmed the desire of all participating states to abstain from the use or threat of force. Signatories would not be able to join other military alliances or other groups of states, while aggression against one signatory would be perceived as an aggression against all. To this end, the CSTO holds yearly military command exercises for the CSTO nations to have an opportunity to improve inter-organisation cooperation. The largest-scale CSTO military exercise held, to date, were the "Rubezh 2008" exercises hosted in Armenia where a combined total of 4,000 troops from all 7 constituent CSTO member countries conducted operative, strategic, and tactical training with an emphasis towards furthering the efficiency of the collective security element of the CSTO partnership.

The Ministry of Defense of Armenia has repeatedly stated that it would expect direct military assistance from the CSTO in case war with Azerbaijan resumes, as recently as December 2009, Defense Minister Ohanyan made the same statement. In August 2009, Nikolay Bordyuzha, the CSTO's secretary-general, confirmed that official Yerevan can count on such support.

On 4 February 2009, an agreement to create the Collective Rapid Reaction Force (KSOR) was reached by five of the seven CSTO members, with plans finalized on 14 June 2009. Armenia is one of the five member states. The force is intended to be used to repulse military aggression, conduct anti-terrorist operations, fight transnational crime and drug trafficking, and neutralize the effects of natural disasters.

=== NATO ===
Armenia participates in NATO's Partnership for Peace (PiP) program and it is in a NATO organization called Euro-Atlantic Partnership Council (EAPC). Armenia is in the process of implementation of Individual Partnership Action Plans (IPAPs), which is a program for those countries that have the political will and ability to deepen their relationship with NATO. Cooperative Best Effort exercise (the first where Russia was represented) was run on Armenian territory in 2003.

=== France ===
On 5 October 2023, following the 2023 Azerbaijani offensive in Nagorno-Karabakh, France announced that it would send defense aid to the Armenian military. Franco-Armenian military cooperation intensified through 2024 with agreements providing Bastion armored personnel carriers, Thales GM200 air surveillance radars, Caesar self-propelled howitzers and air defense systems, alongside agreements to develop Armenia’s domestic defense-industrial base. Military exports from France to Armenia increased from €74 million in 2023 to €204 million in 2024.

=== Greece ===
Greece is Armenia's closest ally in NATO and the two cooperate on multiple issues. A number of Armenian officers are trained in Greece every year, and military aid/material assistance has been provided to Armenia. In 2003, the two countries signed a military cooperation accord, under which Greece will increase the number of Armenian servicemen trained at the military and military-medical academies in Athens.

In February 2003, Armenia sent 34 peacekeepers to Kosovo where they became part of the Greek contingent. Officials in Yerevan have said the Armenian military plans to substantially increase the size of its peacekeeping detachment and counts on Greek assistance to the effort. In June 2008, Armenia sent 72 peacekeepers to Kosovo for a total of 106 peacekeepers.

In November 2024, several sources claimed that Greece was planning to transfer all Russian-made air defences it possessed to Armenia. The equipment includes S-300 long-range SAMs, acquired by Greece after the Cypriot Missile Crisis, Tor-M1 short-medium range SAM, and Osa-AKM short-range systems. The claim has not been confirmed by the Greek MoD yet.

=== Baltic States ===
Lithuania has been sharing experience and providing consultations to the Armenian Defense Ministry in the field of democratic control of armed forces, military and defense concepts and public relations since 2002. Since 2004, Armenian officers have been invited to study at the Lithuanian War Academy and the Baltic Defence College in Tartu, Estonia. Lithuania covers all study expenditures. In early 2007, two Armenian officers for the first time took part in a Baltic lead international exercise, Amber Hope, which was held in Lithuania.

=== United States ===
Armenian troops before loading onto a U.S. Army UH-60 Black Hawk helicopter during a training exercise

The United States has been steadily upping its military clout in the region. In early 2003, the United States Department of Defense announced several major military programs in the Caucasus. Washington's military aid to Armenia in 2005 amounted to $5 million, and in April 2004, the two sides signed a military-technical cooperation accord. In late 2004, Armenia deployed a unit of 46 soldiers, which included bomb-disposal experts, doctors, and transport specialists, to Iraq as part of the American-led Multi-National Force Iraq. In 2005, the United States allocated $7 million to modernize the military communications of the Armenian Armed Forces.

Since 2003, Armenia and the Kansas National Guard have exchanged military delegations as part of a National Guard Bureau program to promote better relations between the United States and developing nations. The program has largely consisted of mutual visits to each other's countries in an effort to share "ideas and [the] best practices for military and emergency management."

Eagle Partner 2023 was a military exercise which took place in Armenia from 11 September to 20 September 2023. The main goal of the exercise was the fortifying of the alliance between the United States with Armenia and also the training of the 12th Peacekeeping Brigade of the Armed Forces of Armenia for future peacekeeping missions. Eagle Partner 2024 began on 15 July 2024. The exercises were scheduled to last through July 24.

On 6 December 2024, Armenian Defense Minister Suren Papikyan held a high-level meeting with United States Secretary of Defense Lloyd Austin at The Pentagon. The two leaders met to discuss the strategic relationship between the United States and Armenia. Austin stated, "Your visit is historic. Armenia extended its hand to the United States and I'm proud to host you here today" and "the U.S. supports a sovereign, independent, and prosperous Armenia and that relationship between the two nations continues to grow closer." Papikyan highlighted the priority of transforming the Armenian Armed Forces and enhancing interoperability with the U.S. Armed Forces.

=== European Union ===
On 22 July 2024, the European Union approved the allocation of 10 million euros to the Armed Forces of Armenia from the European Peace Facility. This marked the first ever funding assistance to the Armed Forces of Armenia from the EU. The funding will be used to increase the material and technical capabilities of Armenia's army. The EU's Foreign Affairs chief, Josep Borrell stated "Security is an important element of bilateral relations with Armenia. The EU has a mutual interest in further expanding dialogue on foreign and security policy, also looking into Armenia's future participation in EU-led missions and operations." Armenia's Foreign Minister Ararat Mirzoyan stated "We salute the historic decisions of EU Foreign Affairs Council on providing assistance to Armenia under the European Peace Facility. This is a very important milestone in the Armenia-EU partnership based on shared values and principles as well as the vision for stability, peace and prosperity." While the Armenian Minister of Defence, Suren Papikyan stated "This initiative will give a new charge to closer cooperation with our partner EU member countries in both bilateral and multilateral formats."

== Peacekeeping operations ==
As of 2022, Armenia is involved in peacekeeping operations in Kosovo, Afghanistan, Lebanon, Mali and Kazakhstan.

=== Kosovo ===
There are 70 Armenian soldiers serving in Kosovo as peacekeepers.

Armenia joined the Kosovo Force in Kosovo in 2004. Armenian "blue helmets" serve within the Greek Army battalion. The relevant memorandum was signed on 3 September 2003, in Yerevan and ratified by the Armenian Parliament on 13 December 2003. The sixth deployment of Armenian peacekeepers departed for Kosovo on 14 November 2006. In 2008, the Armenian National Assembly voted unanimously to double the peacekeeping force in Kosovo by sending an extra 34 peacekeepers to the region, increasing the total number of peacekeepers in the region to 68. Armenia temporarily withdrew its peacekeepers from Kosovo in February 2012 as a result of the reduction of the Greek subdivisions. Armenia redeployed them in July to serve alongside American soldiers in Kosovo.

=== Iraq ===
After the end of the invasion of Iraq, Armenia deployed a unit of 46 peacekeepers under Polish command. Armenian peacekeepers were based in Al-Kut, 100 km (62 mi) from the capital of Baghdad. On 23 July 2006, the fourth shift of Armenian peacekeepers departed for Iraq. The shift included 3 staff commanders, 2 medical officers, 10 combat engineers and 31 drivers. Throughout the length of the deployment, there was one Armenian wounded and no deaths. The Armenian government extended the small troop presence in Iraq by one year at the end of 2005 and 2006. On 7 October 2008, Armenia withdrew its contingent of 46 peacekeepers. This coincided with the withdrawal of the Polish contingent in Iraq.

=== Afghanistan ===
Armenia deployed 130 soldiers in Afghanistan as part of the NATO-led International Security Assistance Force (ISAF). They were serving under German command protecting an airport in Kunduz.

=== Lebanon ===
In 2014, Armenia deployed 33 peacekeepers to Lebanon as part of UNIFIL. Since then, they have served under the Italian contingent and fulfill headquarter security functions.

=== Mali ===
In 2015, one peacekeeper was dispatched to Mali on a monitoring-peacekeeping mission.

=== Kazakhstan ===
In 2022, Armenia sent around 100 servicemen to Kazakhstan as part of the Collective Security Treaty Organization peacekeeping forces. Nikol Pashinyan, who serves as the CSTO chairman, confirmed that the alliance will send 'peacekeepers' to Kazakhstan for a limited period given the threat to national security and the sovereignty of Kazakhstan, due to the 2022 Kazakh protests.
