= Edvard Asryan =

Armenian Lieutenant-General

- Էդվարդ Ասրյան (Armenian)
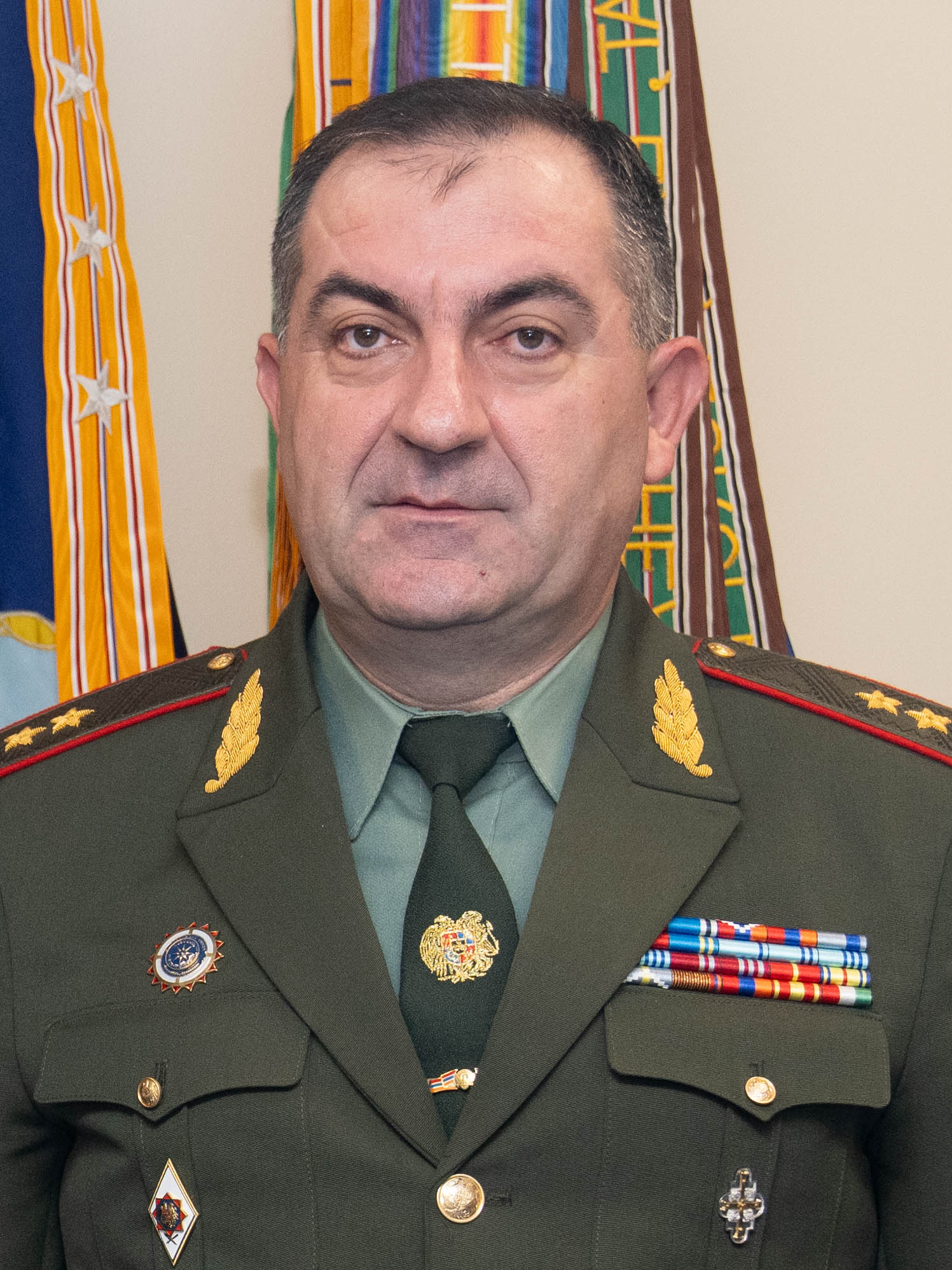
- Born: May 22, 1977 (age 49); Azokh, Hadrut District, Nagorno-Karabakh Autonomous Oblast, Azerbaijan SSR, Soviet Union (now Azykh, Khojavend District, Azerbaijan)
- Education: Artsakh State University
- Military career
- Allegiance: Armenia
- Branch: Armed Forces of Armenia
- Service years: 1994–present
- Rank: Lieutenant-General

Edvard Edisoni Asryan (Armenian: Էդվարդ Էդիսոնի Ասրյան; born May 22, 1977) is an Armenian lieutenant general who served as the chief of the General Staff of the Armenian Armed Forces from since July 14, 2022.

== Early life and education ==
He was born on May 22, 1977, in the village of Azokh, Hadrut District, in the Nagorno-Karabakh Autonomous Oblast. From 1994 to 1999, he studied at Artsakh State University. From 2004 to 2006, he studied at Combined Arms Academy of the Armed Forces of the Russian Federation. In 2018, he took three-month courses at the Military Academy of the General Staff of the Russian Armed Forces. and returned in 2021 for further training.

== Military service ==
From 2015 to 2017, he held the positions of deputy head of the Joint-Services Faculty of the Vazgen Sargsyan Military University, and then head of the faculty. In 2017, he was appointed deputy head of the Operational Department of the General Staff and in 2019, he was appointed head of the department. On October 30, 2020, in the midst of the Second Nagorno-Karabakh War, by decree of President Armen Sarkissian, he was awarded the military rank of major general. On May 21, 2021, Asryan was appointed deputy chief of the General Staff, and on September 27 of the same year, he was dismissed from that position.

=== Chief of the General Staff ===
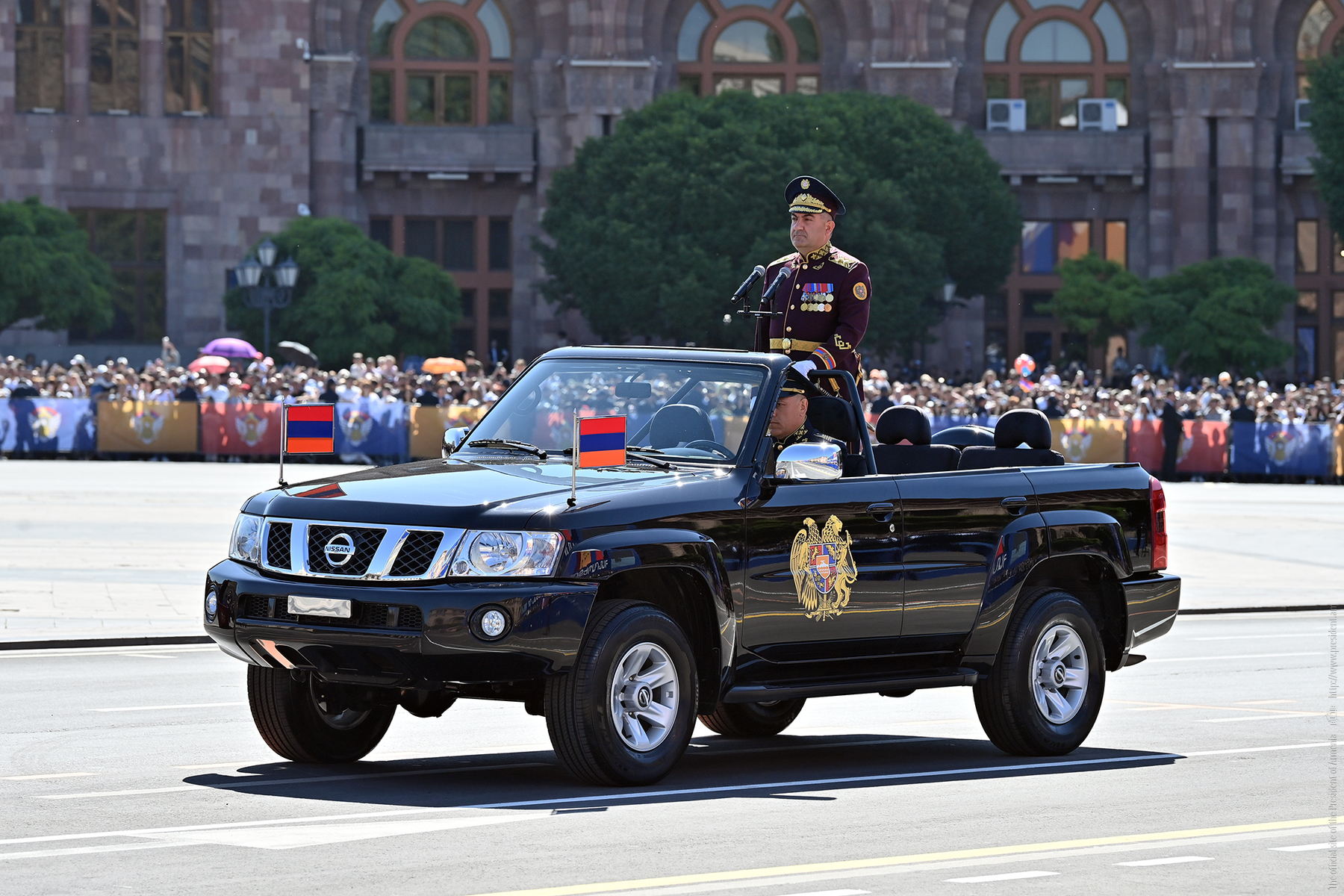
At the 2026 Republic Day parade.

On July 14, 2022, by the decree of the president of Armenia Vahagn Khachaturyan on the advice of Prime Minister Nikol Pashinyan, Asryan was appointed chief of the General Staff of the Armed Forces of the Republic of Armenia for a five-year term. He was presented to the General Staff with Pashinyan on 18 July. On July 5, 2023, Arsyan was awarded the military rank of lieutenant general. He took part in the 2026 Republic Day military parade wearing the newly-introduced ruby-colored full dress uniform for generals of the Armenian Armed Forces.

== Awards ==
- Combat Service Medal (21 January 2013)
