= Erato Detachment =

Armenian military unit

The Erato Detachment (Armenian: Էրատո ջոկատ, romanized: Erato jokat) is a military unit of the Armenian Ground Forces. It is the first all-women military unit in the Armenian Armed Forces. It was created after clashes between Armenia and Azerbaijan occurred in July 2020, and it operated primarily during the 2020 Nagorno-Karabakh war.

== Background ==
During the First Nagorno-Karabakh War in the early 90s, at least 115 Armenian women were known to have taken part in combat missions. In 2013, military academies in Armenia were opened to women for the first time. The Armenak Khanperyants Military Aviation University admitted 5 women that year, and the following year, the Vazgen Sargsyan Military University did the same.

== Unit establishment and activities ==
In August 2020, Anna Hakobyan, the wife of the current Prime Minister of Armenia, Nikol Pashinyan, underwent a week long combat readiness program with women from the Republic of Artsakh. This was in response to the July 2020 Armenian–Azerbaijani clashes. Hakobyan then created a voluntary 45-day training program for women aged 18-27. Upon completion of the program, those that took part could formally join the armed forces.

In late October, a month after hostilities resurged on 27 September, Hakobyan created a platoon-sized unit of 13 female soldiers called the Erato Detachment, named in honor Armenian Queen Erato of Armenia, who ruled the Kingdom of Armenia as part of the Artaxiad dynasty. After its establishment, the unit underwent combat training. In early November, after evaluation, the unit was deemed by the Ministry of Defense of Armenia as being combat ready.

Following the ceasefire signed on 9 November, the detachment remained on guard in their area of responsibility, with there being plans to return to Yerevan for professional training.

== See also ==
- Women's Protection Units
- Night Witches
- Women's Army Corps
