= Military ranks of Armenia =

The military ranks of Armenia are the military insignia used by the Armed Forces of Armenia. Being a former Soviet Republic, Armenia shares a rank structure similar to that of the Soviet Union. Armenia is a landlocked country, and therefore does not possess a navy.

== Commissioned officer ranks ==
The rank insignia of commissioned officers.

| Rank group | General / flag officers | | | | Senior officers | | | Junior officers |
|---|---|---|---|---|---|---|---|---|---|---|
| Armenian Ground Forces |
| Armenian Ground Forces | Բանակի գեներալ Banaki general | գեներալ-գնդապետ General-gndapet | գեներալ-լեյտենանտ General-leytenant | գեներալ-մայոր General-mayor | գնդապետ Gndapet | փոխգնդապետ P’vokhgndapet | մայոր Mayor | կապիտան Kapitan | ավագ լեյտենանտ Avag leytenant | լեյտենանտ Leytenant |
| Armenian Air Force |
| Armenian Air Force | Բանակի գեներալ Banaki general | գեներալ-գնդապետ General-gndapet | գեներալ-լեյտենանտ General-leytenant | գեներալ-մայոր General-mayor | գնդապետ Gndapet | փոխգնդապետ P’vokhgndapet | մայոր Mayor | կապիտան Kapitan | ավագ լեյտենանտ Avag leytenant | լեյտենանտ Leytenant |
| Rank group | General / flag officers | | | | Senior officers | | | Junior officers |

== Other ranks ==
The rank insignia of non-commissioned officers and enlisted personnel.

| Rank group | Senior NCOs | | | | | | Junior NCOs | Enlisted |
|---|---|---|---|---|---|---|---|---|
| Armenian Ground Forces |
| Armenian Ground Forces | ԱՎԱԳ ԵՆԹԱՍՊԱ; Avag yent’aspa | ԵՆԹԱՍՊԱ; Yent’aspa | ԱՎԱԳ; Avag | ԱՎԱԳ ՍԵՐԺԱՆՏ; Avag serzhant | ՍԵՐԺԱՆՏ; Serzhant | ԿՐՏՍԵՐ ՍԵՐԺԱՆՏ; Krtser Serzhant | ԵՖՐԵՅՏՈՐ; Yefreytor | շարքային Shark’ayin |
| Armenian Air Force |
| Armenian Air Force | ԱՎԱԳ ԵՆԹԱՍՊԱ; Avag yent’aspa | ԵՆԹԱՍՊԱ; Yent’aspa | ԱՎԱԳ; Avag | ԱՎԱԳ ՍԵՐԺԱՆՏ; Avag serzhant | ՍԵՐԺԱՆՏ; Serzhant | ԿՐՏՍԵՐ ՍԵՐԺԱՆՏ; Krtser Serzhant | ԵՖՐԵՅՏՈՐ; Yefreytor | շարքային Shark’ayin |
| Rank group | Senior NCOs | | | | | | Junior NCOs | Enlisted |
