= Monte Melkonian Military College =

Military College in Armenia

Coordinates: 40°45′47″N 44°55′47″E

Military and Sports College named after Monte Melkonian
- Մոնթե Մելքոնյանի անվան ռազմամարզական վարժարան
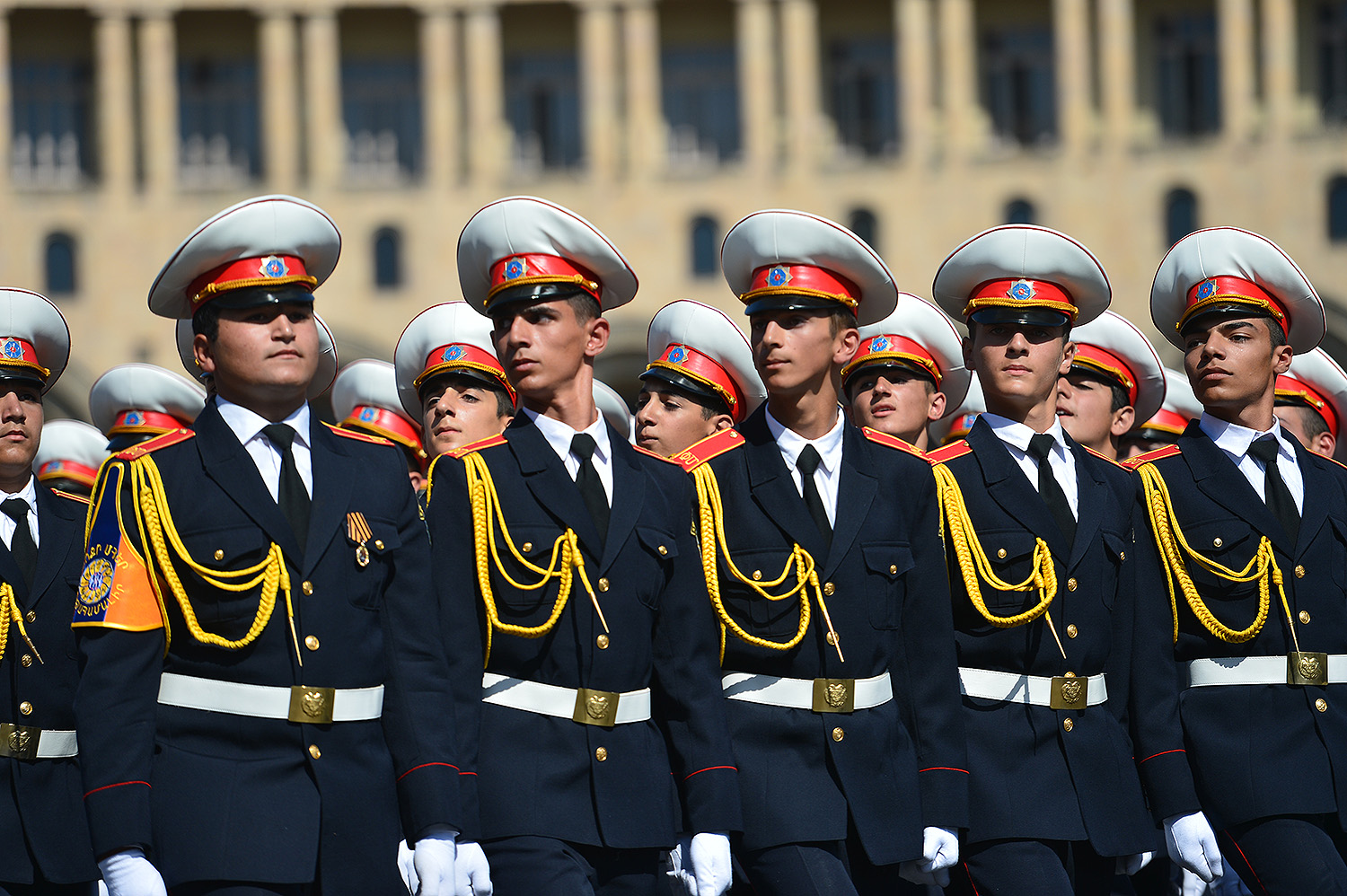
- Cadets of the college in 2016.
- Former names: Military Boarding School of the Ministry of Education of Armenia
- Type: High School, College, Lyceum
- Established: 1993; 33 years ago,2017; 9 years ago
- Founders: Alexan Minasyan
- Affiliations: Ministry of Defence
- Academic affiliations: Ministry of Education and Science
- Students: 200-250
- Location: Parz Lich Street 5, Dilijan, Tavush Marz, Armenia
- Language: Armenian, Russian, English

The Military and Sports College named after Monte Melkonian (Armenian: Մոնթե Մելքոնյանի անվան ռազմամարզական վարժարան), is a high school and military educational institution operated by the Ministry of Defence of Armenia. It was founded in 1993 in Yerevan and is currently based in Dilijan since its relocation in 2017. The college is named after Lieutenant-Colonel Monte Melkonian, a National Hero of Armenia killed in 1993 during the Battle of Aghdam, First Nagorno-Karabakh War. Currently, 194 cadets are enrolled in the college, who come from all over Armenia and the Republic of Artsakh.

== History ==
The school was founded in 1993 and was renamed after Monte Melkonian on July 28, 1994, following his death the previous year. The school was transferred to the Ministry of Defence of Armenia in 1997, and was rebuilt as a secondary educational institution, similar to the Moscow Suvorov Military School in Russia and the Minsk Suvorov Military School in Belarus.

Since 2010, the college has been using a 2-year general education program from 10th to 12th grade. On January 27, 2013, Armenian Prime Minister Tigran Sargsyan transferred the administration of the college to the Ministry of Defense. On November 21, 2017, President Serzh Sargsyan attended the opening ceremony of the new facility of the school in the town of Dilijan, in memory of the 60th anniversary of Melkonian's birth.

In early 2017, the "Pokr Mher" educational complex, which was founded in 2004 as a way to educate of homeless minors, was dissolved and integrated into the military college.

== The academy facility ==
The school's main facility is located in the spa town of Dilijan, containing a training center, as well as an athletics hall, where cadets can play basketball, tennis, chess, and soccer. The facility also has a technology center, which provides information to cadets as well materials for their classes. The college's budget covers the food, the dormitories and the uniform of the cadets.

== List of directors ==
- Lieutenant Colonel Alexan Minasyan (March 14, 1994 – July 29, 1997)
- Major Siran Minasyan (July 29, 1997 – March 18, 2002)
- Colonel Armen Sargsyan (September 2, 2002 – September 9, 2005)
- Colonel Roland Keleshyan (September 9, 2005 – July 23, 2007)
- Colonel Vitaly Voskanyan (July 23, 2007 – August 30, 2017)
- Gegham Sargsyan (interim, August 30, 2017 – 2024)

== See also ==
- Armed Forces of Armenia
- List of military academies in Armenia
