= 12th Peacekeeping Brigade =

- 12-րդ Խաղաղապահ բրիգադ
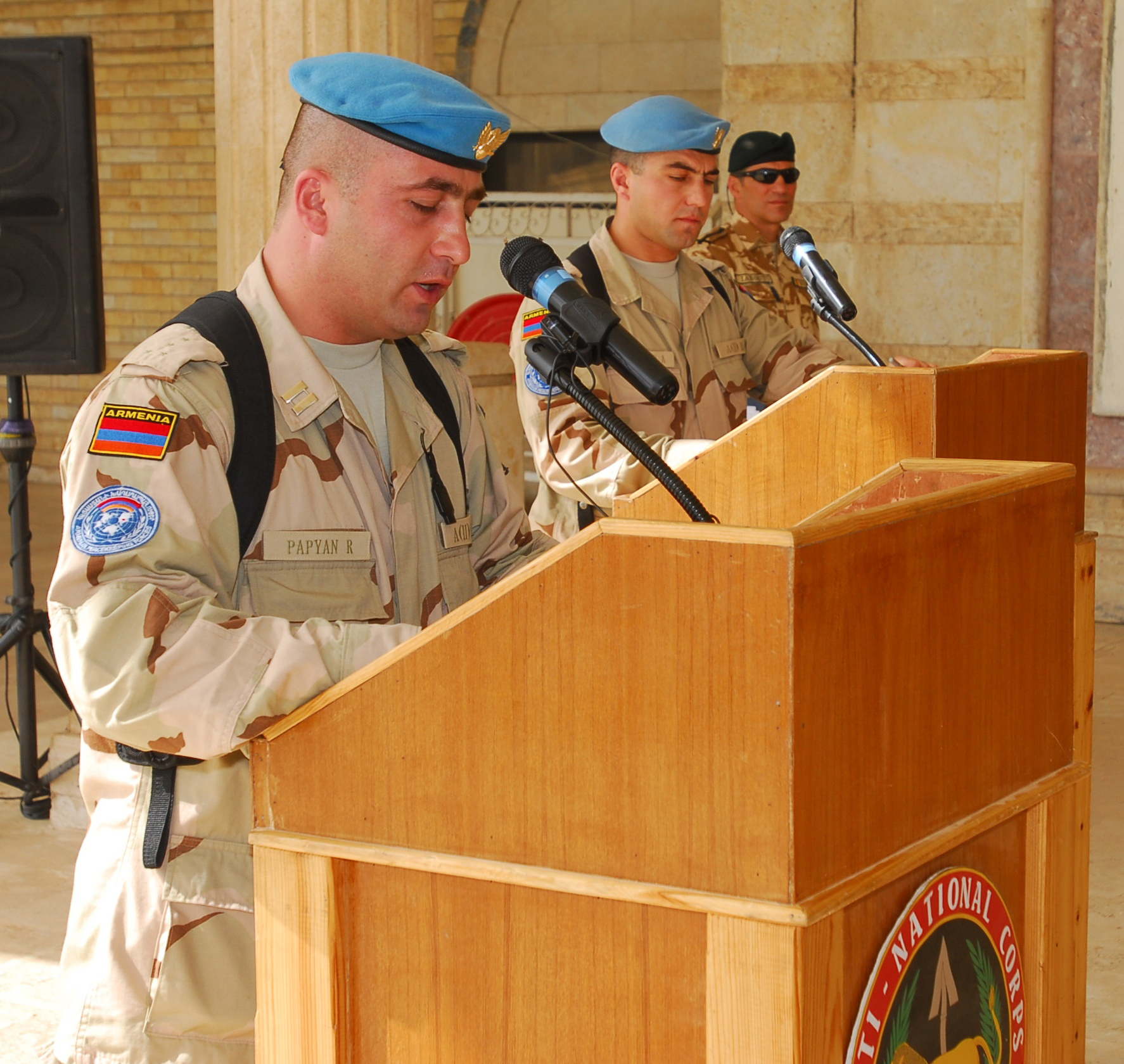
- A member of the brigade at Camp Victory in October 2008.
- Active: July 2001–present
- Country: Armenia
- Branch: Armed Forces of Armenia
- Role: Peacekeeping duties
- Part of: Ministry of Defense of Armenia
- Garrison/HQ: Yerevan
- Nickname: Blue Berets
- Engagements: Peacekeeping missions in Kosovo, Iraq, Afghanistan, Lebanon, Syria and Kazakhstan.

Commanders
- Brigade Commander: Colonel Ruben Papyan

Insignia
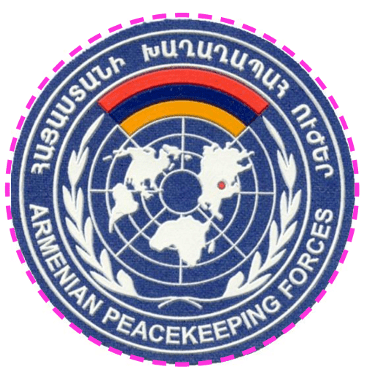
- Shoulder patch

The 12th Peacekeeping Brigade (Armenian: 12-րդ Խաղաղապահ բրիգադ) is a military unit of the Armed Forces of Armenia. Sometimes referred to as the Blue Berets due to its role (and its similarities to the Armenian Airborne Forces), it solely specializes in peacekeeping in foreign countries as part of international initiatives. It is commanded by Colonel Ruben Papyan. In early 2016, Defence Minister Seyran Ohanyan said that he considers the brigade to be the "basis for the establishment of a professional army".

== History ==
In July 2001, a memorandum on Armenian peacekeeping was signed at the Headquarters of the United Nations in New York, being the catalyst for the formation of a peacekeeping unit. Captain Artak Tonoyan was appointed the first commander of the battalion. The battalion was subsequently reformed into a brigade. In February 2004, the first group of Armenian peacekeepers (consisting of 34 soldiers under the command of Lieutenant Artem Avdalyan) were deployed to Kosovo for six months.

In March 2008, the brigade was relocated to the former base of the Capital Regiment. In 2016, its personnel carried the flags of the United States, Germany, Italy, Poland and Greece while taking part in the Independence Day parade on Republic Square. In November 2017, the unit opened a peacekeeping training center (known as the Zar Peacekeeping Area) in Zar. A women's platoon was established that same year as part of the cooperation program between the unit and the United Nations Population Fund.

In 2022, the brigade helped quell unrest during the 2022 Kazakh Unrest.

=== Participation in the Armenian Revolution ===
In April 2018, it was reported that members of the brigade marched alongside antigovernmental forces in the 2018 Armenian revolution. The Armenian Defense Ministry condemned what it described as an illegal action, saying that "The harshest legal measures will be taken against the soldiers".

=== Eagle Partner 2023 ===
In 2023, starting in September 11 and ending in September 20, the Armenian 12th Peacekeeping Brigade and U.S. forces have held a joint military exercise, which focused on strengthening the alliance between the 2 nations, but the main goal was the preparation of the brigade for future peacekeeping operations.

=== Eagle Partner 2024 ===
Colonel Arsen Mangasaryan, commander of the 12th Peacekeeping Brigade said that Eagle Partner 2024 is likely to happen.

== Deployments ==
The 12th Peacekeeping Brigade has collaborated in several international peacekeeping missions with the West and CSTO. They deployed peacekeepers in Kosovo, Iraq, Afghanistan, Lebanon, Syria and Kazakhstan.

=== Kosovo ===
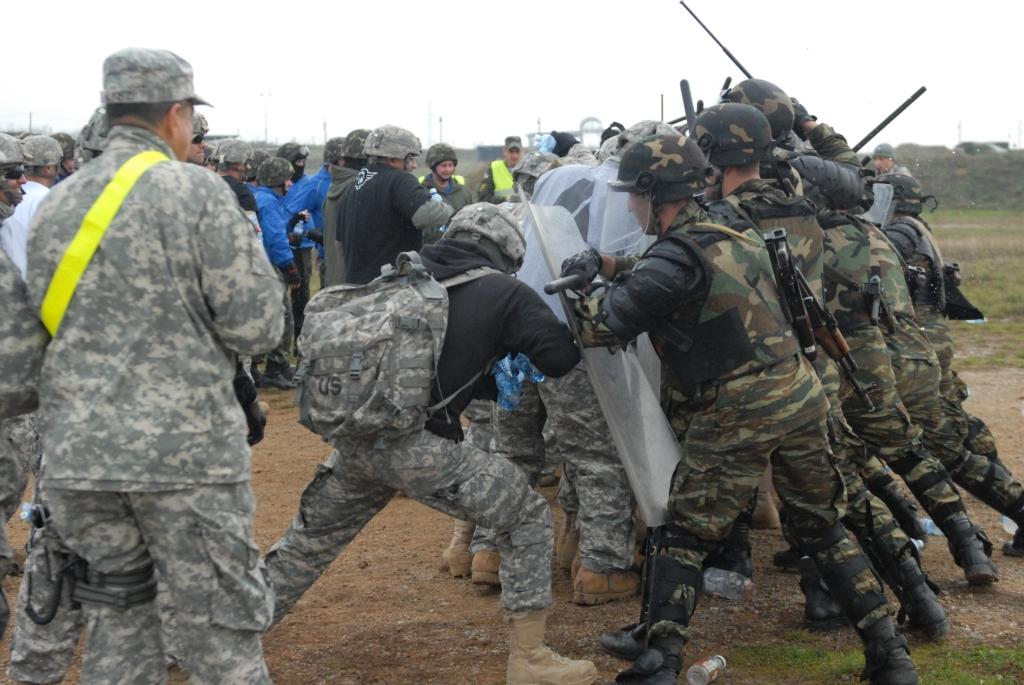
Soldiers from the Kansas National Guard and Armenia practice a riot control exercise

On February 12, 2004, Armenia deployed a contingent of 34 Armenian peacekeepers to Kosovo to carry out a peacekeeping mission as part of a Greek unit in the town of Ferizaj. The contingent was headquartered in Camp "REGAS FEREOS" as a part of the Multi-National Task Force East and was tasked with maintaining vehicle check points, providing security for the base but also served as a quick reaction force and crowd and riot control. In 2008, 70 peacekeepers were sent to replace the contingent of 34 peacekeepers. The peacekeepers left Kosovo in 2011 only to return in 2012, with its new garrison being stationed at a base of United States Army Europe.

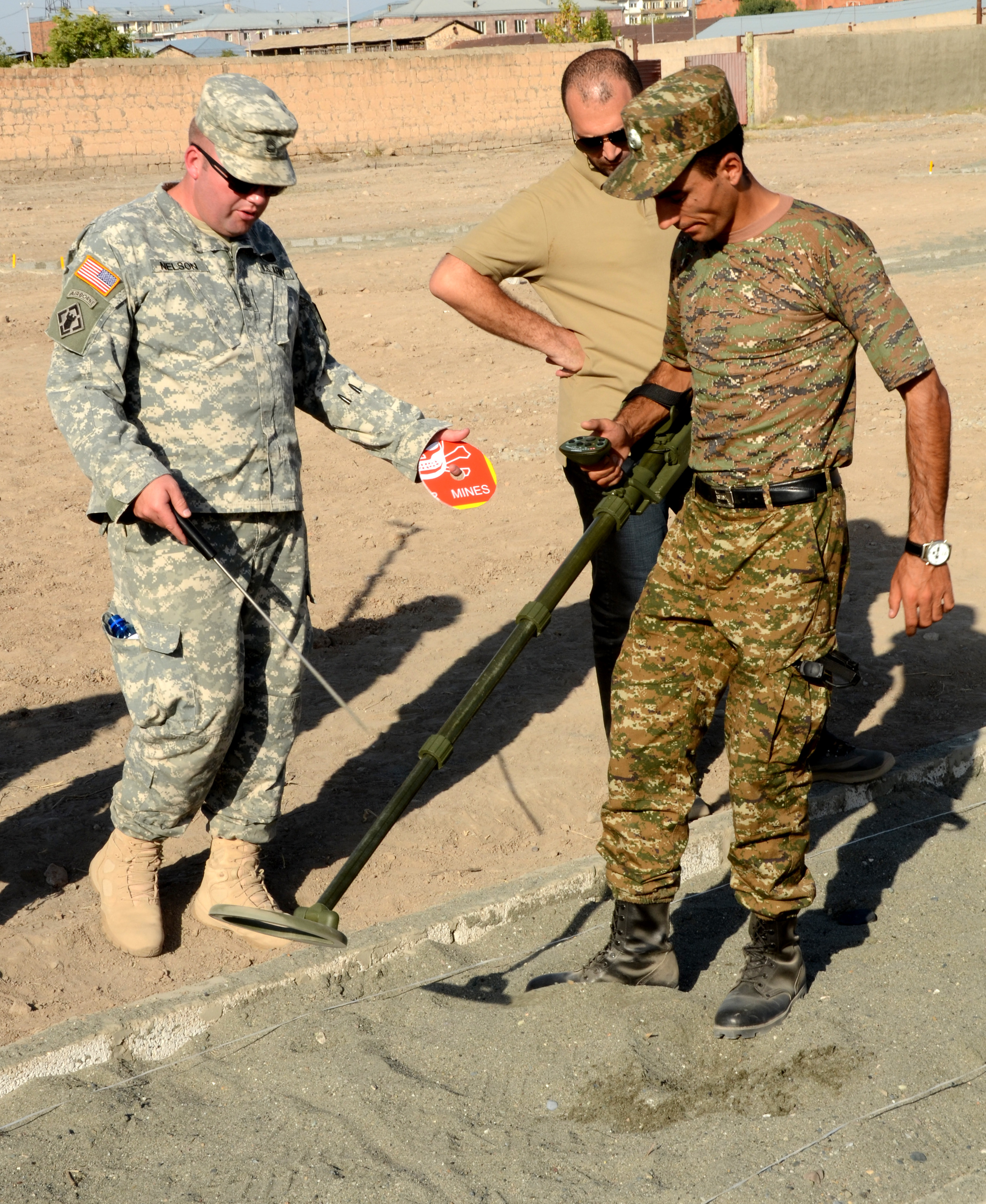
A platoon sergeant with the Kansas National Guard, evaluating an Armenian soldier with the Engineering Company of the brigade.

=== Iraq ===
In January 2005, 45 peacekeepers, together with a Polish unit were deployed in Iraq as part of the Multi-National Force – Iraq. They mainly participated in demining, cargo transportation and medical support activities. On November 10, 2006, Senior Lieutenant Georgy Nalbandyan was injured in a mine explosion in Iraq but survived after being transported for surgery to a hospital in Landstuhl, Germany, near Ramstein Air Base. The contingent of 45 peacekeepers of the Armenian Armed Forces were withdrawn from Iraq in November 2009.

=== Afghanistan ===
In July 2009, the Defense Minister of Armenia, Seyran Ohanyan, announced that Armenia would send a force from the brigade to participate with the International Security Assistance Force (ISAF) in the War in Afghanistan by the end of the year. He did not mention how large the force would be but did note that it probably would include munitions experts and communications officers. A MOD spokesmen also stated that the force would include medical specialists and translators as well. Ohanyan added that Armenian officers who served in the Soviet military during the Soviet–Afghan War also expressed the desire to return there as members of the new force. In November 2009, a NATO official affirmed that an Armenian contingent numbering 30 troops will join the ISAF sometime in early 2010. That number was revised to 40 in early December, when the Armenian parliament overwhelmingly voted in approval of the contingent's deployment. The servicemen arrived in Afghanistan in February 2010, where they carried out a mission jointly with the German Bundeswehr, being tasked to defend the regional airport in Kunduz. They also served in Kabul and Mazar-e-Sharif. There were 126 servicemen in Afghanistan in 2012.

=== Lebanon ===
The peacekeeping brigade of Armenia sent a platoon in Lebanon as part of the United Nations Interim Force in Lebanon. In December 2014, a Lebanese peacekeeping mission started with the participation of an Armenian platoon consisting of 32 servicemen.

=== Syria ===
The brigade became the base of the Armenian contingent in Syria, a task force consisting of 83 medics, demining experts, force protection and other military personnel. This was the first independent foreign deployment of the Armenian military.

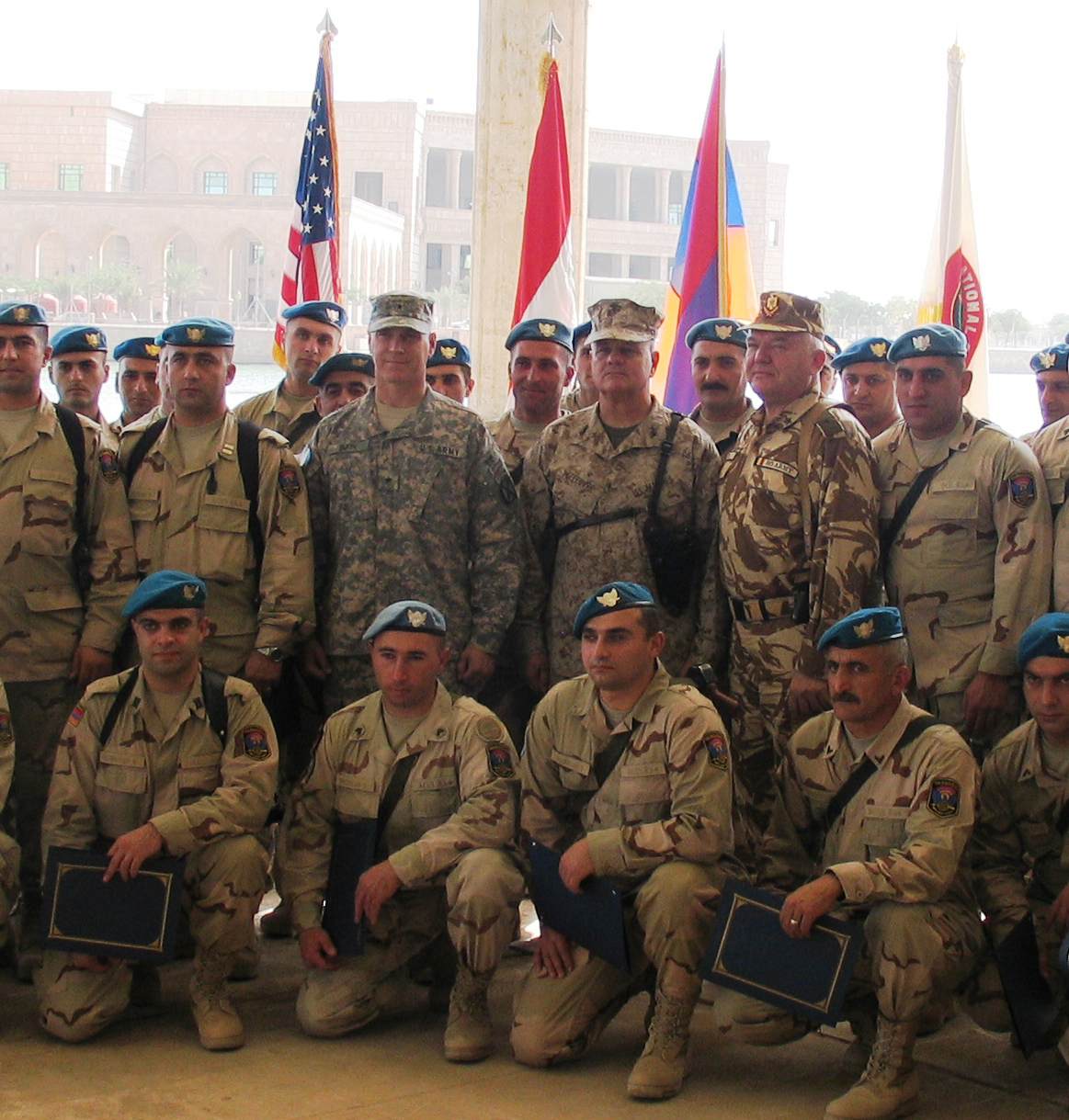
Armenian peacekeepers in Iraq.

=== Kazakhstan ===
100 peacekeepers were deployed to Kazakhstan in the aftermath of the 2022 Kazakh protests, serving to protect water sources and a bread factory in Almaty.

== Commanders ==
- Major General Arthur Simonyan (unknown – 12 October 2017)
- Colonel Vaghinak Sargsyan (12 October 2017 – 20 June 2018)
- Major General Artak Tonoyan (20 June 2018 – 30 December 2021)
- Colonel Arsen Mangasaryan (30 December 2021 – 30 March 2024)
- Colonel Hamlet Levonyan (30 March 2024 - 21 May 2025)
- Colonel Ruben Papyan (21 May 2025 - present)

During the 2020 Nagorno-Karabakh war, it was reported by the Azerbaijani Army that Tonoyan was killed in action, although these reported were later deemed as false.

== See also ==
- Azerbaijani peacekeeping forces
- KAZBAT
- 22nd Peacekeeping Battalion (Moldova)
- Polish–Ukrainian Peace Force Battalion
