= Vazgen Sargsyan Military Academy =

Higher educational institution in Armenia

- Վազգեն Սարգսյանի անվան ռազմական ակադեմիա
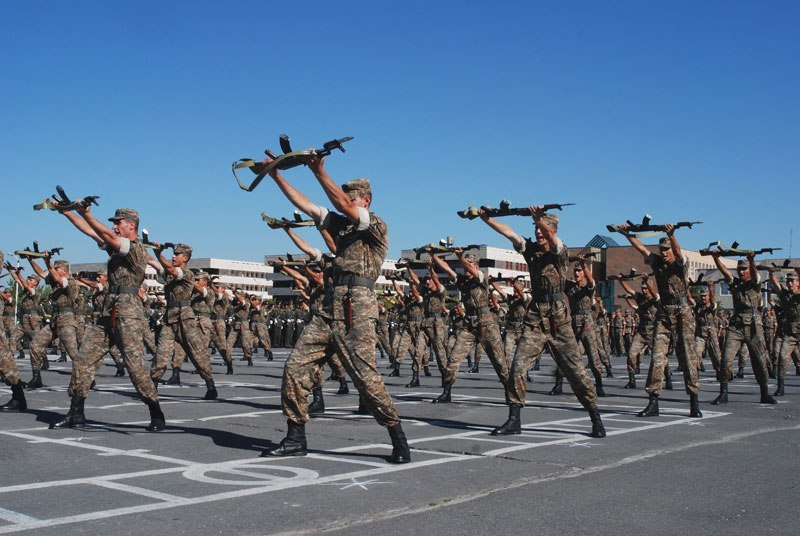
- Armenian soldiers at the Vazgen Sargsyan Military Institute in September 2013.
- Former name: Higher Military Combined Arms Command College
- Type: Military academy
- Established: June 24, 1994; 32 years ago
- Commandant: Major General Arsen Mangasaryan
- Location: 77 Shopron Street, Yerevan, Armenia; 40°11′04″N 44°33′41″E
- Language: Armenian
- Website: mil.am/en/structures/65

The Vazgen Sargsyan Military Academy (Armenian: Վազգեն Սարգսյանի անվան ռազմական ակադեմիա, romanized: Vazgen Sargsyani anvan rrazmakan akademia) is a higher educational institution functioning in the system of the Ministry of Defense of Armenia. Its mission is to prepare and train officers capable of implementing defense tasks in peace and war. It is roughly the equivalent to the United States Military Academy at West Point.

== History ==
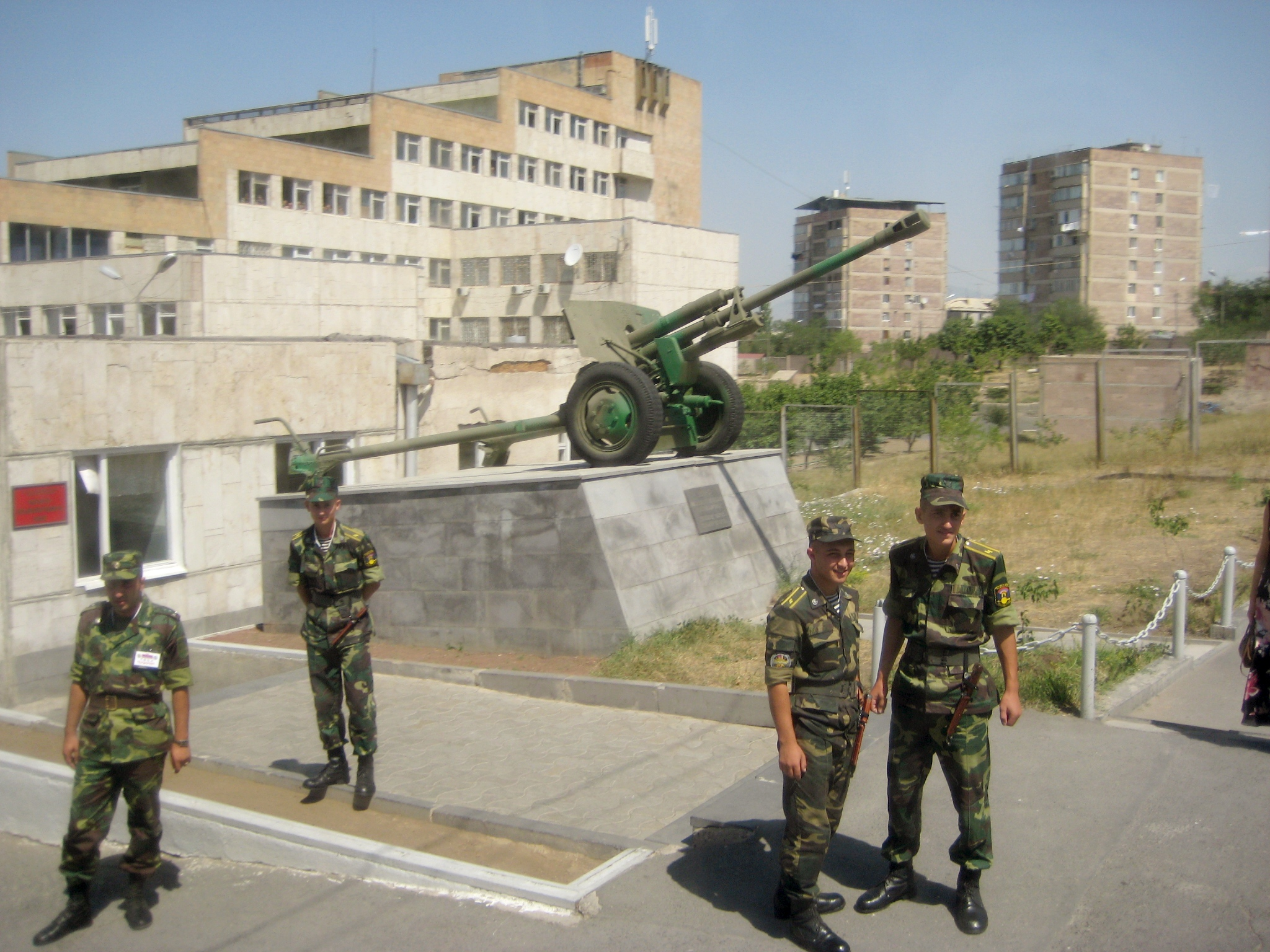
Armenian army soldiers at the university.

The "Higher Military Combined Arms Command College" was founded on June 24, 1994. The Izmirlian Foundation had a major role in the process of establishing the college, financing the construction of two barracks and the heating and power system from 1996-1998. A presidential decree issued by Robert Kocharyan on 28 December 1999, renamed the college to the Military Institute named after Vazgen Sargsyan, the first Armenian Defense Minister and the Prime Minister of Armenia who was killed in the Armenian parliament shooting two months prior. On 12 February 2000, the institute was awarded the Battle Flag as a symbol of military honor. On 27 January 2006, a center for raising the qualification of officers was established at the Military Institute. On 28 April 2012, by the decision of the Government, the Military Institute was reorganized into a military university. In 2013, the university admitted its first group of female cadets. In 2019, the Minister of Education and Science awarded the university with a 4-year institutional accreditation certificate. In 2023, it was merged with the Armenak Khanperyants Military Aviation University and transformed into the Vazgen Sargsyan Military Academy. In 2024, the academy joined the International Association of Military Academies.

== University educational aspects ==
=== Requirements ===
Applicants will need to pass a medical examination as well as take entrance exams. High scores in the Armenian language, physics and mathematics is required for the exam.

=== Faculties and departments ===
The faculty of infantry trains commanders for motorized infantry, tanks, intelligence, field engineer platoons, engineers of military wheeled vehicles and officers with a civil bachelor's degree. In 2013, the Faculty of Command and Staff was established, which was named in 2017 after Marshal Ivan Bagramyan. With the donation of the Vardanyan family, the Department of Physical Fitness and Sports of the Military University was supplemented with new training equipment and a wrestling mat.

=== Courses ===
The Greek language is among the taught languages at the university.

== Structure ==
- Command and Staff Faculty
  - Department of International and National Security
  - Department of Leadership and Management
  - Department of Military Art
- Combined Arms Faculty
  - Department of Tactics
  - Department of Military Equipment and Services
  - Department of Fire Training
  - Department of armored vehicles and automotive equipment
- Artillery faculty
  - Department of Shooting and Artillery Fire
  - Department of Artillery Tactics and Combat Application
  - Department of Armament and Operations
- Department of Daily Management of Units and Military-Legal Training
- Department of Precision Science
- Department of Humanities and Languages
- Department of Physical Education and Sports

== Student life ==
=== State functions ===
The cadets of the university are regular participants in all military parades in Yerevan.

=== Church ===
On 2 August 2020, the Church of St. Mesrop Mashtots was opened. The first stone of the church was laid in 2013 at the initiative of the former head of the military university. Construction was interrupted for a period of time, but in 2020, by order of Defense Minister David Tonoyan, the construction of the church was resumed and was brought to an end. The Church of St. Mesrop Mashtots functions on the territory of the military university.

=== Cooperation ===
The Military University actively cooperates with leading Armenian universities, non-governmental organizations, the Yerkrapah Volunteers, local self-government bodies, and cultural and artistic figures. Visits to concert halls, theaters, museums, historical and cultural centers, participation in Olympiads, competitions are an integral part of the cadets' daily life.

== List of Commandants of the University ==
- Colonel Alexander Minasyan (1994–1996)
- Major General Ashot Petrosyan (1996–1997)
- Major General Arshaluys Paytyan (1998–2000)
- Lieutenant General Stepan Mirzoyan (2000–2007)
- Major General Garegin Gabrielyan (2007–2008)
- Lieutenant General Martin Karapetyan (2008–2015)
- Major General Armen Ghahramanyan (2015–2018)
- Colonel Khachatur Khachatryan (2019–2022)
- Colonel Arthur Yeroyan (2022–February 14, 2024)
- Major General Arsen Mangasaryan (February 14, 2024–present)

== Notable graduates ==
- Artsrun Hovhannisyan, press secretary of the Ministry of Defence (2012–2020)

== See also ==
- War College of the Azerbaijani Armed Forces
- National Defense Academy (Georgia)
- List of universities in Armenia
