= Levon Mnatsakanyan =

Armenian politician

- Լեւոն Մնացականյան

Minister of Defence of the Nagorno Karabakh Republic
- In office 15 June 2015 – 14 December 2018
- President: Bako Sahakyan
- Preceded by: Movses Hakobyan
- Succeeded by: Karen Abrahamyan

Personal details
- Born: 14 September 1965 (age 61) Stepanakert, Azerbaijan SSR, Soviet Union
- Children: 3

Military service
- Allegiance: USSR; Armenia; Artsakh
- Branch/service: Artsakh Defense Army
- Years of service: 1983—85
- Rank: Lieutenant General
- Battles/wars: First Nagorno-Karabakh War; Second Nagorno-Karabakh War

Levon Mnatsakanyan (Armenian: Լեւոն Մնացականյան; born 14 September 1965) is a politician, and a former Minister of Defence of Artsakh.

On September 29, 2023, Azerbaijan detained Levon Mnatsakanyan from the territory of Artsakh, and since that moment he has been held in Baku as a captivity.

== Biography ==
He was born in Stepanakert in 1965 to an Armenian family. Mnatsakanyan began his military service in 1983 when he moved to the Belarusian SSR to work in the Soviet Army's Belarusian Military District. In 1989, he graduated with honors from the Karl Marx Institute of Polytechnic. During the period after the Soviet Union fell apart when Armenia began to build up its military, Mnatsakanyan served in artillery units in the Artsakh Defense Army and the Armed Forces of Armenia. He graduated from the Military Academy of the General Staff of the Armed Forces of Russia in 2005, which resulted in him returning to Artsakh later that year to become the deputy commander of the defense army.

He was appointed by President Bako Sahakyan in 2015 as defense minister, a position he served in for just over 3 years before he was replaced in December 2018. He was then appointed to the post of Director of the State Service of Emergency Situations. He was dismissed in June 2019 and was made Chief of Artskah Police. He is currently married and has three sons.

He took part in the Second Nagorno-Karabakh War in 2020. Near the end of the war, during the Battle of Shusha, Mnatsakanyan commanded the Armenian troops in nearby Shosh.

Mnatsakanyan was detained by Azerbaijani police on 29 September 2023 while attempting to cross the border into the Armenian city of Goris.

On 5 February 2026, an Azerbaijan military court sentenced Mnatsakanyan to life imprisonment on charges such as "waging an aggressive war," "violent seizure of power", etc.

== Awards ==
- Two Orders of the Combat Cross
- Order of St. Vardan Mamikonyan
- Medals "For Services to the Fatherland"
- Medal of Marshal Baghramyan
- Medal of Andranik Ozanyan
- Medal of Admiral Isakov
