= Jalal Harutyunyan =

Armenian general and politician (born 1974)

- Ջալալ Հարությունյան

Minister of Defence Commander of the Artsakh Defense Army
- In office 24 February 2020 – 27 October 2020
- President: Bako Sahakyan; Arayik Harutyunyan
- Preceded by: Karen Abrahamyan
- Succeeded by: Mikael Arzumanyan

Personal details
- Born: 11 November 1974 (age 51) Badara, Nagorno-Karabakh Autonomous Oblast, USSR
- Children: 3
- Awards: Hero of Artsakh

Military service
- Allegiance: Republic of Artsakh
- Branch/service: Artsakh Defense Army
- Years of service: 1992–2022
- Rank: Lieutenant General
- Battles/wars: First Nagorno-Karabakh War; Second Nagorno-Karabakh War

Jalal Anatolii Harutyunyan (Armenian: Ջալալ Անատոլիի Հարությունյան; born 11 November 1974) is an Armenian general from the Republic of Artsakh who formerly served as Commander of the Artsakh Defense Army and Minister of Defense of Artsakh. He commanded the Artsakh Defense Army during the 2020 Nagorno-Karabakh War until his dismissal on 27 October 2020 after being wounded in action. He was appointed Head of the Military Control Service of the Ministry of Defense of Armenia in February 2021. Harutyunyan was suspended from this role in connection with a criminal case opened against him in September 2022. In February 2025, he was found guilty of "careless attitude towards military service" during a particular incident of the 2020 war. Harutyunyan was sentenced to 5 years and 6 months' imprisonment.

== Early life and education ==
Harutyunyan was born on 11 November 1974, in Badara, then a part of the Nagorno Karabakh Autonomous Oblast in the Azerbaijan SSR. His father, Anatoli Harutyunyan, was vice-principal and mathematics teacher at a local school, while his mother, Svetlana Arushanyan, worked as a nurse. From 1991 to 1995, he studied biology at Artsakh State University. In 1999, he entered the Mikhailovskaya Artillery Military Academy in Saint Petersburg under the Ministry of Defense of the Russian Federation, from which he graduated with honors.

== Career ==
Harutyunyan has served in the Artsakh Defense Army since 5 November 1992, when he volunteered for service at the age of 17. He fought in the First Nagorno-Karabakh War from 1992 to 1994. He served in various positions in the Defense Army, primarily in artillery units such as the Assistant to the Head of Artillery Intelligence. He also served as artillery chief of one of Artsakh's military districts. From 2018 to 2020, he served as First Deputy Commander of the Artsakh Defense Army. On 24 February 2020, he was appointed Minister of Defense by President Bako Sahakyan and was reappointed by President Arayik Harutyunyan on 8 June.

Harutyunyan made a call for battle during the 2020 Nagorno-Karabakh war against Azerbaijan. On 27 October 2020, the president of Artsakh announced that Harutyunyan was relieved of his position after being wounded in fighting, replacing him with Mikael Arzumanyan. A video showing a UAV strike on a car that allegedly belonged to Harutyunyan began circulating online. However, the spokesperson of the president of Artsakh denied the footage had anything to do with Harutyunyan's injuries. On October 28, 2020, the president of Artsakh announced his decision to grant Jalal Harutyunyan the title Hero of Artsakh. He was discharged from hospital in early December 2020.

In January 2021, the Prosecutor General's Office of Armenia announced that a criminal case had been opened already in October 2020 on the attempt on Harutyunyan's life made during the war, and stated that no one had been charged in connection with the case yet. In February 2021, by the order of Vagharshak Harutyunyan, Defense Minister of Armenia, Harutyunyan was appointed to the post of the Head of the Military Control Service of the Ministry of Defense of Armenia.

On 2 September 2022, the Investigative Committee of Armenia announced that a criminal case had been opened against Jalal Harutyunyan on two counts of "careless attitude towards military service" during the 2020 Nagorno-Karabakh war. As a result, his tenure as Head of the Military Control Service was suspended. According to the prosecution, Harutyunyan misidentified enemy forces as friendly during fighting near the village of Cuvarlı (in the Fuzuli District of Azerbaijan), leading to casualties and the loss of positions and materiel on the Armenian side. Harutyunyan was found guilty, and on 7 February 2025 he was sentenced to 5 years and 6 months' imprisonment. The general's lawyer stated that the verdict will be appealed.

== Dates of rank ==
Promotions
Insignia	Rank	Date
	Major General	8 July 2019
	Lieutenant General	15 October 2020
