= Kamo Vardanyan =

Armenian general of the Arsakh Defence Army

Minister of Defence
- In office 11 September 2021 – 1 January 2024
- President: Arayik Harutyunyan; Samvel Shahramanyan
- Preceded by: Mikael Arzumanyan
- Succeeded by: Office abolished

Personal details
- Born: 18 March 1966 (age 60) Norashen, Nagorno-Karabakh Autonomous Oblast, Soviet Union

Military service
- Allegiance: Republic of Artsakh
- Branch/service: Artsakh Defence Army
- Rank: Lieutenant general
- Battles/wars: First Nagorno-Karabakh War; Four-Day War; Second Nagorno-Karabakh War

Kamo Bahaturi Vardanyan (Armenian: Կամո Բահատուրի Վարդանյան; born 18 March 1966) is an Armenian military officer from the Republic of Artsakh. He served as the last Minister of Defence of Artsakh and Chief of Staff of the Artsakh Defence Army.

== Early life and education ==
Vardanyan was born on 18 March 1966 in the village of Norashen, Hadrut District, Nagorno-Karabakh Autonomous Oblast. He studied at a rural school in Norshen.

== Military career ==
Vardanyan began serving in the Nagorno-Karabakh Defence Army on 1 February 1992, where he rose from platoon commander to commander of a mountain motorized rifle formation. He participated in the First Nagorno-Karabakh War, the 2016 Nagorno-Karabakh conflict, and the Second Nagorno-Karabakh War.

Vardanyan graduated from the Combined Arms Academy of the Armed Forces of the Russian Federation (2006) and the Military Academy of the General Staff of the Armed Forces of the Russian Federation (2019). By decree of President Bako Sahakyan on 6 May 2011, he was promoted to the rank of major general.

In November 2012, Vardanyan was appointed first deputy chief of staff of the Nagorno-Karabakh Defence Army. On 11 September 2021, he was appointed by President Arayik Harutyunyan as Minister of Defence and chief of staff of the Artsakh Defence Army. In January 2022, he was promoted to the rank of lieutenant general.

== Personal life ==
Vardanyan is married and has three children.
