= Movses Hakobyan =

Armenian military commander

- Մովսես Հակոբյան
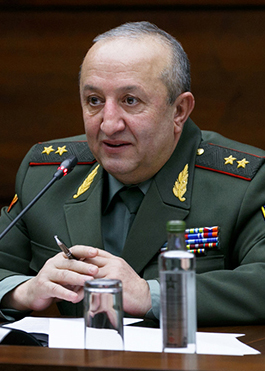
- Hakobyan in 2017

Chief of the General Staff of the Armenian Armed Forces
- In office 3 October 2016 – 24 May 2018
- President: Serzh Sargsyan
- Preceded by: Yuri Khachaturov
- Succeeded by: Artak Davtyan

Deputy Chief of General Staff of Armenian Armed Forces
- In office 15 June 2015 – 3 October 2016
- President: Serzh Sargsyan
- Preceded by: Levon Mnatsakanyan
- Succeeded by: Haykaz Bagmanyan

Minister of Defence of the Nagorno Karabakh Republic
- In office 11 May 2007 – 15 June 2015
- President: Arkadi Ghukasyan; Bako Sahakyan
- Preceded by: Seyran Ohanyan
- Succeeded by: Levon Mnatsakanyan

Personal details
- Born: 4 February 1965 (age 61) Chartar, Nagorno Karabakh, Soviet Union
- Awards: see below

Military service
- Allegiance: USSR (1982–1992); Republic of Artsakh (1992–2015); Armenia (2015–present)
- Branch/service: Soviet Army; Nagorno-Karabakh Defense Army; Armed Forces of Armenia
- Years of service: 1982 – 2020
- Rank: Colonel-General
- Battles/wars: Soviet–Afghan War; First Nagorno-Karabakh War

Movses Hranti Hakobyan (Armenian: Մովսես Հրանտի Հակոբյան; born 4 February 1965) is a former senior Armenian military official and the former commander of NKR Defense Army and former Chief of the General Staff of the Armenian Armed Forces. From 19 November 2018 until his resignation on 18 November 2020, Hakobyan served as the Chief Military Inspector of the Armed Forces.

== Biography ==
Hakobyan was born in the town of Chartar in the Martuni region of the Nagorno Karabakh Autonomous Oblast. He graduated from the secondary school of Chartar in 1982 and entered the Alma-Ata Army Command College in the same year. From 1986 to 1987, he served in the 553rd Motorized Rifle Regiment, based in the Transcaucasian Military District, as an infantry platoon commander. Hakobyan then served in the Soviet armed forces stationed in Afghanistan during the Soviet–Afghan War as deputy commander of a rifle company. In 1988, he returned to the Transcaucasian Military District to serve as company commander with the 366th Motorized Rifle Regiment, stationed in Stepanakert. After the regiment was pulled out from Stepanakert in March 1992, Hakobyan joined the Nagorno Karabakh Self-Defense Forces.

During the First Nagorno-Karabakh War he participated in military operations in Martuni, Askeran, Martakert, Aghdam and was wounded at least three times. Hakobyan was the commander of the battalion of his native village Chartar from July–September 1992. Afterward he served as deputy commander, then the commander, of Shushi defense district from 1992 to 1993. From September to December 1993, he commanded the defense of Monteaberd (Martuni). Subsequently and until 1998, he was commander of the 2nd Defense District of Martuni and from 1998 to 1999 of 4th Defense District of Askeran. From 1999 to 2001, Hakobyan was deputy commander of the Nagorno-Karabakh Defense Army, in charge of combat readiness.

Following his graduation from Russia's Academy of the General Staff, on 24 July 2002, Hakobyan was appointed Adviser to the Defense Minister of Armenia, and in July 2003, as first deputy commander and chief of staff of the NKR Defense Army. Hakobyan became the Defence Minister of Nagorno-Karabakh on 11 May 2007 by decree of the President of Nagorno-Karabakh Arkadi Ghukasyan, succeeding Seyran Ohanyan.

In June 2015, Hakobyan was appointed deputy chief of the General Staff of the Armed Forces of Armenia. Hakobyan was appointed Chief of the General Staff on 3 October 2016. He was dismissed from this post by newly elected Prime Minister Nikol Pashinyan on 24 May 2018 and appointed Head of the Military Control Service of the Armenian Ministry of Defense (chief military inspector). Hakobyan was dismissed from his post as chief military inspector on 19 November 2019 but later reappointed to the same post.

On 18 November 2020, during the political crisis created by the 2020 Nagorno-Karabakh ceasefire agreement, he submitted his resignation from the post of Head of the Military Control Service of the Armenian Ministry of Defense. Hakobyan gave a press conference following his resignation where he alleged a number of failures by Nikol Pashinyan's government in the 2020 Nagorno-Karabakh war. Hakobyan's press conference became the subject of investigation by the Prosecutor General's Office of Armenia. On 3 May 2021, Hakobyan was charged with revealing state secrets and summoned by Armenia's National Security Service for questioning.

== Personal life ==
Hakobyan is married and has two children. His nephew, Armen Grigoryan, served as the Secretary of the Security Council of Armenia from 2018-2026.

== Awards ==
- (Republic of Artsakh) Hero of Artsakh (2 September 2002)
- (Republic of Artsakh) Order of the Combat Cross, 1st degree
- (Republic of Artsakh) Order of the Combat Cross, 2nd degree
- (Armenia) Order of the Combat Cross, 2nd degree
- (Armenia) Medal "For Services to the Fatherland", 1st degree
- (Armenia) Order of Vardan Mamikonian
- (Soviet Union) Order of the Red Star
- (Soviet Union) Jubilee Medal "70 Years of the Armed Forces of the USSR"
- (Soviet Union) Medal "Soldiers-Internationalists"
- Medal "From the Grateful People of Afghanistan"
