= Karen Abrahamyan =

Armenia stub

Minister of Defence of Artsakh
- In office 14 December 2018 – 24 February 2020
- President: Bako Sahakyan
- Preceded by: Levon Mnatsakanyan
- Succeeded by: Jalal Harutyunyan

Personal details
- Born: Karen Andranik Abrahamyan; 4 December 1966 (age 58); Hadrut Province, NKAO, Soviet Union
- Children: 2

Military service
- Allegiance: Soviet Union; Armenia; Artsakh
- Branch/service: Artsakh Defense Army
- Rank: Lieutenant General
- Battles/wars: First Nagorno-Karabakh War

Karen Abrahamyan (Armenian: Կարեն_Աբրահամյան; born 4 December 1966) is a politician and general, who is the former Minister of Defence of Artsakh.

== Biography ==
He was born in the village of Khcaberd of the Hadrut Province of the Azerbaijan SSR. There, he attended the M. Manvelyan Secondary School, graduating in 1984. During the 6 years, he studied at the Institute of National Economy of Armenia with a major in economics.

From 1990 to 1992, Abrahamyan worked in Hadrut's Savings Bank as a crediting instructor, chief accountant and then Savings Bank's manager. In the mid-1990s, he began to become more involved in the activities of the newly formed defense army in the Nagorno-Karabakh Republic. During this time, he had assumed various military positions, such as platoon commander, deputy commander, and a chief of staff a regiment. In 1998, entered the Russian Defense Ministry’s Military University and graduated with honours.

Once he returned to Armenia in 2001, he spent the next 15 years rising through ranks while serving in essential military positions in the Armenian Armed Forces. In December 2018, by decree of the President Bako Sahakyan, Abrahamyan, who was the military chief of staff at the time, was appointed as the defense minister and commander of the defense army. This happened just 10 days after his 52nd birthday. He was dismissed in February 2020.
