= Ministry of Defence (Artsakh) =

Government Agency

Ministry of Defence of the Republic of Artsakh
- Լեռնային Ղարաբաղի Հանրապետության պաշտպանության նախարարություն

Agency overview
- Formed: 26 March 1992; 34 years ago
- Preceding agency: NKR Self-Defence Committee
- Dissolved: January 1, 2024
- Jurisdiction: Government of Artsakh
- Headquarters: Stepanakert
- Minister responsible: Lieutenant General Kamo Vardanyan (last), Minister of Defense and Commander of the Defense Army
- Child agency: Artsakh Defence Army
- Website: www.nkrmil.am

The Ministry of Defense of the Republic of Artsakh (Armenian: Արցախի Հանրապետության պաշտպանության նախարարություն) was a government agency of the unrecognized Republic of Artsakh. It was the executive body in implementing defence policies of the Artsakh Defence Army. The final minister of defence was Lieutenant General Kamo Vardanyan.

== History ==
On 26 March 1992, the Defence Committee under the NKR Council of Ministers was established. On the initiative and under the direct leadership of the NKR Defence Committee, a number of very important and urgent events were launched during the First Nagorno-Karabakh War. Following an Azerbaijani assault on 19 September 2023, Artsakh agreed to dissolve itself by 1 January 2024.

== Assets ==
=== Martik ===
Martik was the official newspaper of the Defence Army. The first issue of the newspaper was published on March 16, 1993. It was originally called the "Combat Sheet". It was created at a time when there were no other sources of information that primarily served to convey frontline information to the public. The first editor of the official newspaper, then called the coordinator, was Valeri Atajanyan. The newspaper was edited by Hrant Aleksanyan, Vahram Atanesyan, Marcel Petrosyan and Mher Harutyunyan at different times. It was part of the Public Relations Department of the Defence Army. The last editor of "Martik" was Yeraz Harutyunyan. As of 2018, it has issued 4,000 copies.

=== Goyamart ===
The "Goyamart" TV program was a branch of the Defence Army political department that serves as the equivalent to the Armed Forces Network. People such as current National Assembly Deputy Vardges Ulubabyan had a role in its establishment.

=== Music units ===
Military music in the Defence Army included a large repertoire of traditional Armenian and foreign music (mainly Russian marching music). Russian marches include Den Pobedy, the March of the Preobrazhensky Regiment, and the Jubilee Slow March "25 Years of the Red Army". The Ministry of Defence maintains a military band that was notably led by Nerik Grigoryan and Vagan Sargsyan and participates in holidays such as the Day of the Artsakh Republic. It was founded in May 1997, by the order of the Chief of Staff of the NKR Self-Defence Committee. It became active by November. It was associated with the Band of the General Staff of the Armed Forces of Armenia. The army also maintained the Song and Dance Ensemble "Aspet".

== List of ministers ==
No.	Picture	Minister of Defense	Took office	Left office	Time in office	Ref.
1	Samvel Babayan	Lieutenant General; Samvel Babayan (born 1965)	January 1995	August 1999	4 years, 7 months	
2	Seyran Ohanyan	Colonel General; Seyran Ohanyan (born 1962)	August 1999	11 May 2007	7 years, 9 months	
3	Movses Hakobyan	Lieutenant general Movses Hakobyan (born 1965)	11 May 2007	15 June 2015	8 years, 1 month	
4	Levon Mnatsakanyan	Lieutenant general Levon Mnatsakanyan (born 1965)	15 June 2015	14 December 2018	3 years, 5 months	
5	Karen Abrahamyan	Lieutenant general Karen Abrahamyan (born 1966)	14 December 2018	24 February 2020	1 year, 2 months	
6	Jalal Harutyunyan	Lieutenant General; Jalal Harutyunyan (born 1974)	24 February 2020	27 October 2020	247 days	
7	Mikael Arzumanyan	Lieutenant General; Mikael Arzumanyan (born 1973)	27 October 2020	11 September 2021	319 days	
8	Kamo Vardanyan	Lieutenant General; Kamo Vardanyan (born 1966)	11 September 2021	1 January 2024	2 years, 112 days	

* Incumbent's time in office last updated: 18 July 2026.

== See also ==
- Armed Forces of Armenia
- Ministry of Defence of Armenia
