= Mikael Arzumanyan =

Armenian military personnel

Minister of Defence
- In office 27 October 2020 – 11 September 2021
- President: Arayik Harutyunyan
- Preceded by: Jalal Harutyunyan
- Succeeded by: Kamo Vardanyan

Personal details
- Born: 12 June 1973 (age 52) Stepanakert, Nagorno-Karabakh Autonomous Oblast, USSR

Military service
- Allegiance: Republic of Artsakh
- Branch/service: Artsakh Defence Army
- Years of service: 1991–present
- Rank: Lieutenant General
- Battles/wars: First Nagorno-Karabakh War; 2020 Nagorno-Karabakh war

Mikael Alberti Arzumanyan (Armenian: Միքայել Ալբերտի Արզումանյան; born 12 June 1973) is a Lieutenant General from the Republic of Artsakh, who formerly served as the Commander of the Artsakh Defence Army and Minister of Defence. He was born on 12 June 1973 in Stepanakert in the Nagorno Karabakh Autonomous Oblast.

From 1991 to 1992, during the First Nagorno-Karabakh War, he was a volunteer in the Company of Bekor Ashot, taking part in the battles for Füzuli, Martakert, Askeran and Kelbajar. From 1995 to 1999, Arzumanyan commanded a separate reconnaissance battalion. In 1999, he graduated from the Yerevan State University. In the early 2000s, he was a student of the Military Academy of the Ministry of Defense of the Russian Federation. Then, he was in the position of division commander. In February 2018, Arzumanyan was dismissed from the post of First Deputy Commander of Military Unit No. 19916. On 24 June 2019, he was appointed Deputy Commander of the Defense Army. A year later, on 21 June, he was relieved of this position. On 27 October 2020, President of Artsakh Arayik Harutyunyan appointed Arzumanyan as Minister of Defense. His appointment followed the injury of his predecessor Jalal Harutyunyan during the Second Nagorno-Karabakh War. Along with his appointment to the post, Arzumanyan was awarded the rank of Lieutenant general. Following the ceasefire agreement that ended the war, he promised a review of military shortcomings in the Defence Army. He was dismissed on 11 September 2021.

== Awards ==
- Order of the NKR "Battle Cross" I Degree
- Order of the Republic of Armenia "Battle Cross" II Degree
- Medal of the NKR "For the liberation of Shushi"
- Medal of the Republic of Armenia "For Services to the Fatherland" II Degree
