= Artsakh Defence Army =

Army of Artsakh Republic

Defense Army of the Republic of Artsakh
- Արցախի Հանրապետության պաշտպանության բանակ
- Patch
- Founded: 9 May 1992 (34 years, 174 days)
- Disbanded: 20 September 2023 (3 years, 40 days)
- Headquarters: Stepanakert

Leadership
- Commander-in-Chief: Robert Kocharyan (1994–1997); Samvel Shahramanyan (2023–2024)
- Minister of Defence: Samvel Babayan (1995–1999); Lieutenant General Kamo Vardanyan (2021–2024)
- Commander of the Defence Army: Samvel Babayan (1993–1999); Lieutenant General Kamo Vardanyan (2021–2024)
- Chief of Staff: Lieutenant General Anatoly Zinevich (1994–1997); Major General Kamo Vardanyan (until 11 September 2021)

Personnel
- Military age: 18
- Conscription: 24 months
- Active personnel: ~12,000 (until September 2023)
- Reserve personnel: 20,000–30,000 (before 2020)

Industry
- Foreign suppliers: Armenia

Related articles
- History: First Nagorno-Karabakh War (1988–1994); Battle of Shusha (1992) on (8–9 May 1992); Opening the Lachin corridor between Armenia and Nagorno-Karabakh (1992); Mardakert and Martuni Offensives (summer–autumn 1992); Defence of the Martakert front from 1992 to 1994; Battle of Kalbajar on (27 March – 3 April 1993); Agdam, Fizuli, Jebrail and Zangelan offensives (June–August 1993); Nagorno-Karabakh conflict (1994–2024); 2008 Mardakert clashes (2008); 2010 Mardakert clashes (2010); 2012 Armenian–Azerbaijani border clashes; 2014 Armenian–Azerbaijani clashes; 2016 Nagorno-Karabakh clashes; Second Nagorno-Karabakh War (27 September 2020 – 10 November 2020); Battle of Hadrut (October 2020); Battle of Shusha on (4–7 November 2020); 2023 Azerbaijani offensive in Nagorno-Karabakh

The Defense Army of the Republic of Artsakh (Armenian: Արցախի Հանրապետության պաշտպանության բանակ, romanized: Artsakhi Hanrapetut’yan pashtpanut’yan banak, also Defense Army of the Republic of Nagorno-Karabakh), also known as Artsakh Defence Army (or Nagorno-Karabakh Defence Army) was the defence force of the breakaway Republic of Artsakh. Established in 1992, it united previously disorganized defence units which were formed in the early 1990s.

It was disbanded on 20 September 2023 under the terms of the Nagorno-Karabakh ceasefire agreement following the 2023 Azerbaijani military offensive.

== History ==
=== Establishment ===
The Artsakh Defence Army was founded on 9 May 1992. It created "its own central command and military structure distinct from the Armenian Army." Its founders included Robert Kocharyan (the former President of Armenia, he was the first commander-in-chief of the Army); Serzh Sargsyan (former Prime Minister and President of Armenia); Vazgen Sargsyan (Armenia's Defence Minister 1992–93, State Minister in Charge of defence 1993–95, Armenia's Prime Minister 1998–99); Monte Melkonian (responsible for Martuni Province); Samvel Babayan (Nagorno-Karabakh's Defence Minister from 1994 to 2000) and others. Many of the men who served in its ranks and in the officer corps during the First Nagorno-Karabakh War were seasoned veterans of the Soviet military and had fought in the Soviet–Afghan War.

=== First Nagorno-Karabakh War ===
The formal formation of the NKR Defence Army was rooted in the concept of the Jokat (volunteer detachment). With the early outbreak of hostilities prior to 1992, Armenians of Nagorno-Karabakh began forming small detachments of volunteers, often self-described as Fedayeen, inheriting the name of the fighters who actively resisted the Ottoman Empire in the final decades of the nineteenth and early decades of the twentieth centuries.

At the outset these detachments were small groups of no more than 12–40 men. For example, during Operation Ring, Shahumyan was defended by a force as small as 22 men under the command of Tatul Krpeyan. These volunteer militia would initially arm themselves with whatever was available, including hunting shotguns borrowed from local farmers and even home-made rifles. In the later stages of the war, these units armed themselves with AK-47s, RPGs and sometimes MANPADs, transforming the defence force into a highly mobile and flexible force that was capable of waging guerrilla warfare. Likewise, these units initially had no heavy military equipment, but later started taking over large quantities of Azerbaijani tanks and armored personnel carriers that were abandoned on the battlefield. Most of these captured tanks and APCs later became part of the NKR Defense Army's equipment. Improvization, multi-functionality, creativity, strong-morale, focus on defensive tactics, adaptation, flexibility, high-mobility and a native knowledge of the mountainous terrain were all important factors in understanding the combat success of these small units.

The initial purpose of these detachments, made up of volunteers, was mainly to defend Armenian civilian population, each in a particular village or town. Each of them was operating independently with no central command or leadership. Yet, these units would regularly collaborate in joint operations such as the battle of Khojaly in February 1992 or the June 1992 surprise counter-offensives during Operation Goranboy. The increasing scale and intensity of Azerbaijani attacks, the devastation caused by Grad multiple rocket launchers firing from Shusha and the Lachin, the blockade from mainland Armenia had broadened the notion of security beyond the mere defence of a small village. Capturing Shusha and Lachin as well as turning the tide of Operation Goranboy became, for the Armenians, not only a matter of security, but that of survival. For the successful conduct of such large-scale operations, the detachments had to be consolidated under a single, unified command.

Mient Jan Faber argues that "August 1992 marked the watershed between purely voluntary Armenian Karabakh forces reinforced by volunteers from Armenia and an organised NKR army with its own central command and a military structure distinct from the Armenian army."

=== Post war ===
The Nagorno-Karabakh Defence Army's primary role after the conclusion of the First Nagorno-Karabakh War in 1994 was the protection of the NKR from foreign and domestic threats. Though the war ended with the signing of a cease fire between Armenia, Nagorno-Karabakh and Azerbaijan and the de facto independence of the NKR, the Azerbaijani leadership repeatedly threatened to restart hostilities to retake the region. Violations of the cease fire along the line of contact were frequent and often resulted in the deaths of several soldiers and civilians each year. One of the most significant breaches of the ceasefire occurred in Martakert on 8 March 2008, when up to sixteen soldiers were killed. Both sides accused the other of starting the battle. In June 2010, new skirmishes broke out between Armenian and Azerbaijani troops along the line of contact, resulting in the deaths of four Armenian servicemen. Clashes in summer 2014 resulted in the deaths of six Armenian and thirteen Azerbaijani servicemen. On 12 November 2014, a Nagorno-Karabakh Defence Army Mi-24 attack helicopter participating in the week-long joint Armenian–NKR Unity 2014 military exercises was shot down by the Azerbaijani military, killing all three crew members. On 1 April 2016 large scale clashes began along the line of contact, which lasted for four days and came to be known as the Four-Day War. According to several sources they were the worst since 1994. These clashes culminated in the 2020 Nagorno-Karabakh war, in which the Artsakh Defence Army was defeated while fighting against the military of Azerbaijan and Turkey. Turkish President Recep Tayyip Erdogan Erdogan admitted that Turkey provided military and diplomatic backing to Azerbaijan during the fighting. During the war, Turkey sent a number of Syrian opposition fighters as mercenaries to fight against Armenian forces, including fighters from Sultan Murad Division and Hamza Division.

In May 2021, President Arayik Harutyunyan announced planned to transform the Defense Army into a professional combat force.

It was disbanded on 21 September 2023 following the 2023 Nagorno-Karabakh clashes, as one of the conditions imposed by Azerbaijan to end the clashes.

== Structure ==
The Ministry of Defence served as the chief administrative body of the Defence Army.

=== Chiefs of Staff ===
- Lieutenant General Anatoly Zinevich (1994–1997)
- Major General Kamo Vardanyan (until 11 September 2021)

== Defense Districts ==
The five Defense Districts were the following:

=== Central Defense District ===
NKR self-defense detachments were formed on 22 February 1988. At the end of 1991 and at the beginning of 1992, more than ten volunteer detachments and detachments were formed in Stepanakert and included more than a thousand fighters. Motorized regiments were then formed on the basis of the following structure:

- 1st Motorized Rifle Battalion
- 2nd Motorized Rifle Battalion
- 3rd Motorized Rifle Battalion

In September 1989, the Central Defense District (also known as the Stepanakert Defense District) was formed on the basis of those battalions. The 8th Separate Motorized Rifle Brigade was part of the district, being formed on 14 October 1992. It was named after "Commander Vazgen Sargsyan".

=== Hadrut Defense District ===
Its first battalion was formed on 16 July 1992. The district was formed in September 1992, in accordance with the order of the Chairman of the Committee for Self-Defense of the Artsakh Republic in August 1992.

=== Martuni Defense District ===
It was formed in September 1991 by the order of the President on the basis of self-defense detachments and platoon operating in the region. The Mataghis Military Unit was part of the district. It was based in the Madagiz settlement of the Martakert Province. In May 2017, the commander and two deputies of the military unit were dismissed after 3 soldiers drowned after their UAZ-315195 vehicle fell into a reservoir. Among its notable commanders was Mikael Arzumanyan, serving as the commander of the unit at the age of 22.

=== Shahumyan Defensive Region ===
The Yeghnikner ("The Deers") Detachment was founded on 11 March 1993 and was considered to be one of the most elite units of the army of the unrecognized republic. It originated from a partisan unit created by Shahen Meghryan, which was formed on 25 June 1992 from self-defense detachments of the district villages. Among its symbols were the coat of arms of the Meliks of Gulistan and its unit banner. The Shahumyan Defensive Region (SDR) was formed by the Chairman of the Self Defense Committee in March 1993, originally incorporating two battalions Between 1993 and 1994, SDR units participated in battles and operations in Martakert and Shahumyan.

On 2 October 2021, President Arayik Harutyunyan conferred the title of Hero of Artsakh on the commander of the Yeghnikner unit Karen Jalavyan. After the 2020 war, rumors on the Internet claimed that the unit had to leave its positions, which was denied by the commander.

=== Askeran Defense District ===
Askeran Defense District was formed by the order of the NKR IPC President of August 14, 1992. There were 4 rifle battalions in the district:

- 1st Rifle Battalion
- 2nd Rifle Battalion
- 3rd Rifle Battalion
- 4th Rifle Battalion

== Personnel ==
According to Richard Giragosian, the Artsakh Defence Army in 2009 was composed of around 20,000 officers and soldiers and maintained a "constant state of readiness, undergoing more serious combat training and operational exercises than any other former Soviet army." The Nagorno-Karabakh Defence Army maintained a small air force with a personnel of around 250 men. While the NKDA did not formally disclosed personnel numbers, the International Institute for Strategic Studies (IISS) estimated that the NKDA had 12,000 personnel prior to its defeat in September 2023. The IISS also stated that the regular Army was supported by volunteers and irregular troops.

=== Personnel units ===
==== Special Forces ====
The Special Forces of the Artsakh Defense Army was established in 2000. Based on the previous National Guard, it carries out both of planned and unplanned combat operations. Among its notable commanders were Samvel Harutyunyan. On 11 August 2010, a memorial fountain was unveiled in Aygestan community of Askeran region on August 10 in memory of the fallen soldiers of the Special Forces. The memorial was built with the financial means of the former and current servicemen of the detachment. Their professional holiday was on 5 November.

==== Engineer Battalion ====
The Defense Army had an engineering battalion that was involved in the clearance of minefields of strategic importance. It was formed on 1 February 1995. Roles Aghajanyan was the first head of the Defence Army engineering services.

=== Educational institutions ===
- Vazgen Sargsyan Military University
- Kristapor Ivanyan Military College
- Armenak Khanperyants Military Aviation University
- Yerevan State Medical University Military Faculty

== Equipment ==
The Nagorno-Karabakh Defence Army's equipment consisted of infantry, tanks, artillery and anti-aircraft systems. The Karabakh army's heavy military hardware included: 186 tanks, 68 armoured vehicles, 98 artillery pieces of calibres over 122mm, 44 multiple rocket launchers (most likely BM-21 Grad), and an anti-aircraft defence system of an unspecified type

As for infantry, most relied on the AK-74 rifle and older AKMs in reserve for standard-issue rifles. Other basic weapons consisted of Makarov PM pistols, PK machine guns, and RPG-7 rocket launchers, all mostly supplied by Armenia. The Nagorno-Karabakh military was deeply integrated with the Armenian military, and the NKR depended on the Armenian Army to ensure its survival as an independent national entity. Armenia considered any act of aggression against Karabakh as an act of aggression against itself.

=== Ground Forces ===
The NKDA relied mostly on weapons supplied by Armenia until 2020 in addition to Soviet-era stocks. In the aftermath of the 2023 Azerbaijani offensive in Nagorno-Karabakh, the Azerbaijanis reported that large weapon caches were seized.

==== Small arms ====
Name	Origin	Caliber	Image	Notes
Pistols
Makarov	Soviet Union	9×18mm Makarov		
APS	USSR	9×18mm Makarov		
Assault rifles
AKM	USSR	7.62×39mm		The AKMS variant was also used.
AK-74	USSR	5.45×39mm		Standard rifle of Artsakh Defence Army. The AKS-74 variant was also used.
AK-74M	Russia	5.45×39mm		
AK-103	Armenia; Russia	7.62×39mm		
Sniper rifles
SVD	USSR	7.62×54mmR		
Machine guns
RPK-74	USSR	5.45×39mm		
PK	USSR	7.62×54mmR		
Grenades
F-1	USSR	N/A		
Anti-tank weapons
9K111-1 Konkurs	USSR	135 mm		
SPG-9	USSR	73 mm		
Man-portable air-defense systems
9K310 Igla-1	USSR	N/A		
9K38 Igla	USSR	N/A		

==== Vehicles and artillery ====
Model	Image	Origin	Quantity	Details
Tanks
T-72		USSR	~20	T-72AV and T-72B variants.
T-72 SIM-2 Aslan		USSR; Azerbaijan	1	
T-90S		Russia	1	
Reconnaissance
BRDM-2		USSR	N/A	
Armoured fighting vehicles
MT-LB		USSR; Armenia	3+	Armed with a Zastava M55 anti-aircraft gun.
Infantry fighting vehicles
BMP-1		USSR	~50	
BMP-2		USSR	~100	
Towed artillery
KS-19		USSR	1+	Used in the ground role.
D-30		USSR	16+	
D-20		USSR	9+	
2A36 Giatsint-B		USSR	3+	
120mm M75 mortar		Yugoslavia	3+	
Hell cannon		Armenia	5+	Used in the Second Nagorno-Karabakh war.
Multiple rocket launchers
BM-21 Grad		USSR	N/A	
Surface-to-air missile systems
9K331 Tor-M1		USSR	1+	
9K33 Osa		USSR	3+	
Anti-aircraft guns
ZSU-23-4		USSR	N/A	
ZU-23-2		USSR	N/A	
Utility vehicles
UAZ-452		USSR	5+	
UAZ-469		USSR	2+	
UAZ Patriot		Russia	1+	
Trucks
ZIL 131		USSR	4+	
GAZ-3308		Russia	1+	
KAMAZ		Russia	7+	4x4 and 6x6 versions were used.
Ural-4320		Russia	23+	The Ural-43206 variant was also used.
Unmanned aerial vehicles
DJI Mavic 3		China	2+	

=== Air Force ===
The table below lists aircraft of Artsakh Defence Army Air Force, also known as Nagorno-Karabakh Defence Army Air Force. The data is from World Air Forces 2026 publication, which still in 2025 lists aircraft of Nagorno-Karabakh Defence Army Air Force (under "Armenia" section, see) even though Nagorno-Karabakh Defence Army has been dissolved since September 2023. Naturally the current status, wheabouts or even existence of the aircraft listed is questionable as of late 2025.

Aircraft	Origin	Type	Version	In service	Notes
Combat aircraft
Sukhoi Su-25	Russia	Attack	Su-25	2	
Combat helicopter
Mil Mi-8	Russia	Utility	Mi-8/17/171	5	
Mil Mi-24	Russia	Attack	Mi-24	5	

== Military holidays ==
Shushi Liberation Day (9 May) and Homeland Defender's Day (28 January) were two military holidays celebrated by the Defence Army. The former commemorates the founding of the military as well as the Capture of Shusha and the traditional Victory Day celebrations commemorating the surrender of Nazi Germany at the end of the Great Patriotic War in 1945. Because of this, it was sometimes referred to as a "triple holiday". An annual military parade was held in the capital, with a reception being held at the local House of Officers in the capital.

Whereas the Armenian Army celebrated Army Day on 28 January, the Defence Army celebrated Homeland Defender's Day on the same day.

== See also ==
- Land mine situation in Nagorno-Karabakh
