= Casualties of the Second Nagorno-Karabakh War =

The casualties of the Second Nagorno-Karabakh War, fought between Armenia, the self-proclaimed Republic of Artsakh internationally recognized as the territory of Azerbaijan and Azerbaijan, officially number in the low thousands. According to official figures released by the belligerents, Armenia and Artsakh lost 3,825 troops, with 187 servicemen missing in action, while Azerbaijan lost 2,906 troops, with 6 missing in action. The Syrian Observatory for Human Rights reported the deaths of 541 Syrian fighters or mercenaries fighting for Azerbaijan. However, it is believed that the sides downplayed the number of their own casualties and exaggerated the numbers of enemy casualties and injuries.

The total number of reported civilian fatalities on both sides is at least 185, the whereabouts of 21 Armenian civilians remain unknown. Civilian areas, including major cities, have been hit, particularly Khankendi, Khojavend, Aghdere, Shusha, Ganja, Barda and Tartar in Azerbaijan, with many buildings and homes destroyed.

== Military casualties ==
=== Armenian ===
The Armenian side reported the deaths of 3,825 servicemen during the war, while 187 remained missing. The Armenian losses included 742 killed servicemen of the Artsakh Defence Army and 45 missing.

By 30 September, the Azerbaijani authorities claimed more than 700 Armenian servicemen were killed or wounded. Armenian Colonel Sergey Shakaryan and Colonel Vahagn Asatryan also died. On 2 November, Artur Sargsyan, Artsakh Republic Deputee Minister of Defense, was killed in combat.

Armenian sources also reported the deaths of several sportspeople in the military: Gor Sargsyan, a member of the Armenian Judo Federation youth team, Albert Dadoyan, a European powerlifting champion, Tatul Harutyunyan, the champion of Armenia in powerlifting, Erik Saryan, player of FC Lokomotiv Yerevan, and Liparit Dashtoyan, a former player of FC Alashkert-2.

=== Azerbaijani ===
During the conflict, the government of Azerbaijan did not disclose the number of its military casualties. This was the first time Azerbaijan did not provide data on combat casualties, whereas during the First Nagorno-Karabakh War in 1988–1994 and in the April 2016 clashes, the Azerbaijani army reported this information. On 8 December 2020, the Azerbaijani Defense Ministry released a full list of military casualties, with names, ranks and birth dates. By 21 October 2021, the list was updated to include the deaths of 2,906 servicemen, with another 6 missing in action.

The Armenian side reported 7,630 Azerbaijani soldiers and Syrian mercenaries were killed.

Similar to the Armenian side, Azerbaijani sources also reported the deaths of athletes serving in the military: Arif Qeybiyev, a three-time champion of Azerbaijan in cross country running, and Mukhtar Qasimli, the champion of Azerbaijan in bodybuilding. On 22 October, the National Hero of Azerbaijan and veteran of the 2016 clashes, Colonel Shukur Hamidov, was killed. On 23 November, Colonel Babak Samidli died from a land-mine in post-armistice search for missing soldiers.

On 25 October, the death of an ethnic Russian Azerbaijani soldier, Dmitry Solntsev, was reported. On 27 October, the first woman military casualty was reported, a combat medic who died while taking wounded soldiers from the battlefield.

==== Syrian mercenaries ====
In December 2020, the Syrian Observatory for Human Rights reported the deaths of 541 Syrian fighters or mercenaries fighting for Azerbaijan. The dead included a veteran commander of the Turkish-backed Hamza Division, whose death was reported by Sayf Bulad. In April 2021, Syrians for Truth and Justice confirmed 293 of these deaths.

== Civilian casualties ==
=== Armenian ===
According to Armenian sources, on 27 September, two civilians were killed by Azerbaijani shelling in Aghdam Province, with approximately a dozen injured in Stepanakert; the Azerbaijani Defense Ministry denied these claims. On 10 October, Armenian media reported the killing of two civilians in Hadrut, a mother and her son with a disability, according to Armenia the killing would have been carried out by Azerbaijani infiltrators. Armenian authorities reported 85 Armenian civilians were killed and 21 were missing in the war. However, a doctor in the city of Stepanakert reported that up to 300 to 400 Armenian civilians had been killed in the war as of 25 October.

Armenian sources also indicated the clashes have displaced approximately half of Nagorno-Karabakh's population or approximately 70,000 people.

=== Azerbaijani ===
According to Azerbaijani sources, the Armenian military has targeted densely populated areas containing civilian structures. Human Rights Watch confirmed total of 32 people killed in the ballistic missile attacks on Ganja. On 28 October, following the Barda missile attacks that killed around 26 civilians, the number of Azerbaijani civilians killed reached 91 and with 322 injured.

According to the Prosecutor General's Office of Azerbaijan, a total of 100 Azerbaijani civilians were killed and 416 were injured during the war.

=== Third parties ===
On 1 October, two French journalists from Le Monde covering the clashes in the city of Aghdam, were injured by Azerbaijani fire. A week later, three Russian journalists reporting in Shusha were seriously injured by an Azerbaijani attack. 13-year-old Russian citizen Artur Mayakov died of wounds received during the ballistic missile attacks on Ganja on 17 October.

== Equipment losses ==
=== Armenian ===
From the start of the war on 27 September to 17 October the Azerbaijani MoD reported the destruction of up to 100 Armenian tanks and other armored vehicles, up to 100 artillery pieces, multiple launch rocket systems and mortars, up to 150 vehicles, up to 60 air defense means, 11 command-control and command-observation posts, eight ammunition depots and one S-300 missile system. On 29 September Azerbaijan separately reported the destruction of a BM-27 Uragan rocket launcher.

On 2 October, the Azerbaijani Center for Economic Reforms Analysis and Communication estimated Armenian losses at US$1.2 billion.

On 9 October Azerbaijan reported that from the previous day until then 13 Armenian T-72 tanks, two IFVs, four BM-21 Grad launchers, two 2S3 Akatsiya self-propelled guns, three D-30 howitzers and two radar systems were destroyed.

On 11 October Azerbaijani media reported the destruction of five T-72 tanks, six D-20 and D-30 howitzers, five trucks with ammunition, 11 other vehicles, three BM-21 Grad, five 2S1 Gvozdika self-propelled howitzers and eight air defense systems. On the same day it was reported that an Azerbaijani TB2 drone destroyed one Armenian Nebo-M radar station, having fired a MAM-L missile.

On 14 October Azerbaijani media reported the destruction of five T-72 tanks, three BM-21 Grad rocket launchers, one 9K33 Osa missile system, one BMP-2 vehicle, one KS-19 air defense gun, two D-30 howitzers and several military automobiles. On the same day the Azerbaijani MoD claimed the destruction of three R-17 Elbrus tactical ballistic missile launchers that had been targeting Ganja and Mingachevir.

On 17 October Azerbaijan claimed the further destruction of one Sukhoi Su-25 aircraft, seven T-72 tanks, one S-300 missile system, one S-125 missile system, two BM-21 Grad rocket launchers, eight D-30 and one D-20 howitzer, 10 trucks with ammunition and 7 vehicles.

On 18 October Azerbaijan reported the destruction of another Sukhoi Su-25 aircraft and, separately, three Tor M2KM missile systems by a precise MAM-L missile strike.

On 19 October, the Azerbaijani MoD reported the destruction of two more T-72 tanks, two BM-21 Grad launchers, one D-30 howitzer, one D-20 howitzer and 11 automobile vehicles.

On 20 October, Azerbaijani president Ilham Aliyev released a detailed list of destroyed and captured Armenian equipment, according to Azerbaijan. The destroyed equipment included 241 tanks, 50 IFVs, six drones, three Tor units, one TOS-1 unit, four S-300 missile systems, 70 BM-21 Grad units, about forty 9K33 Osa units, five 2K12 Kub and 2K11 Krug units, two BM-27 Uragan units, 198 trucks, 17 self-propelled artillery units, 53 anti-tank weapons, 198 guns, 58 mortars and eight electronic warfare units. The captured trophies included 39 tanks, 24 IFVs, 12 mortars, 25 grenade launchers and 102 cargo vehicles. The captured tanks have been reused against Armenian forces themselves.

On 21 October three more Armenian drones were reportedly destroyed by the Azerbaijani air defense forces.

On 29 October, two more Armenian Su-25 were destroyed, according to Azerbaijani Defense Ministry.

=== Azerbaijani ===
Armenian and Karabakh authorities initially claimed the downing of four Azerbaijani helicopters and the destruction of ten tanks and IFVs, as well as 15 drones. Later the numbers were revised to 34 tanks and armored personnel vehicles destroyed, two armored combat engineering vehicles destroyed and four helicopters and 27 unmanned aerial vehicles downed all within the first day of hostilities. Footage was released showing the destruction or damage of five Azerbaijani tanks.

Over the course of 2 October, the Karabakh Defence Army claimed the destruction of 39 Azerbaijani military vehicles, including a T-90 tank; four Sukhoi Su-25 aircraft; three Mi-24 attack helicopters; and 17 drones. Until 19 October, 100 Azerbaijani tanks are said to have been destroyed or captured.

As of 8 November, the Armenian government-operated Armenian Unified InfoCenter claimed that Armenian forces have destroyed 264 drones, 16 attack helicopters, 25 warplanes, 784 armored vehicles, six TOS systems, four BM-30 Smerch launchers and one Uragan launcher.

== See also ==
- Armenian POWs during the Second Nagorno-Karabakh War
