= Nagorno-Karabakh conflict =

Conflict between Armenia and Azerbaijan

- Part of the post-Soviet conflicts and spillover of the Armenian–Turkish conflict
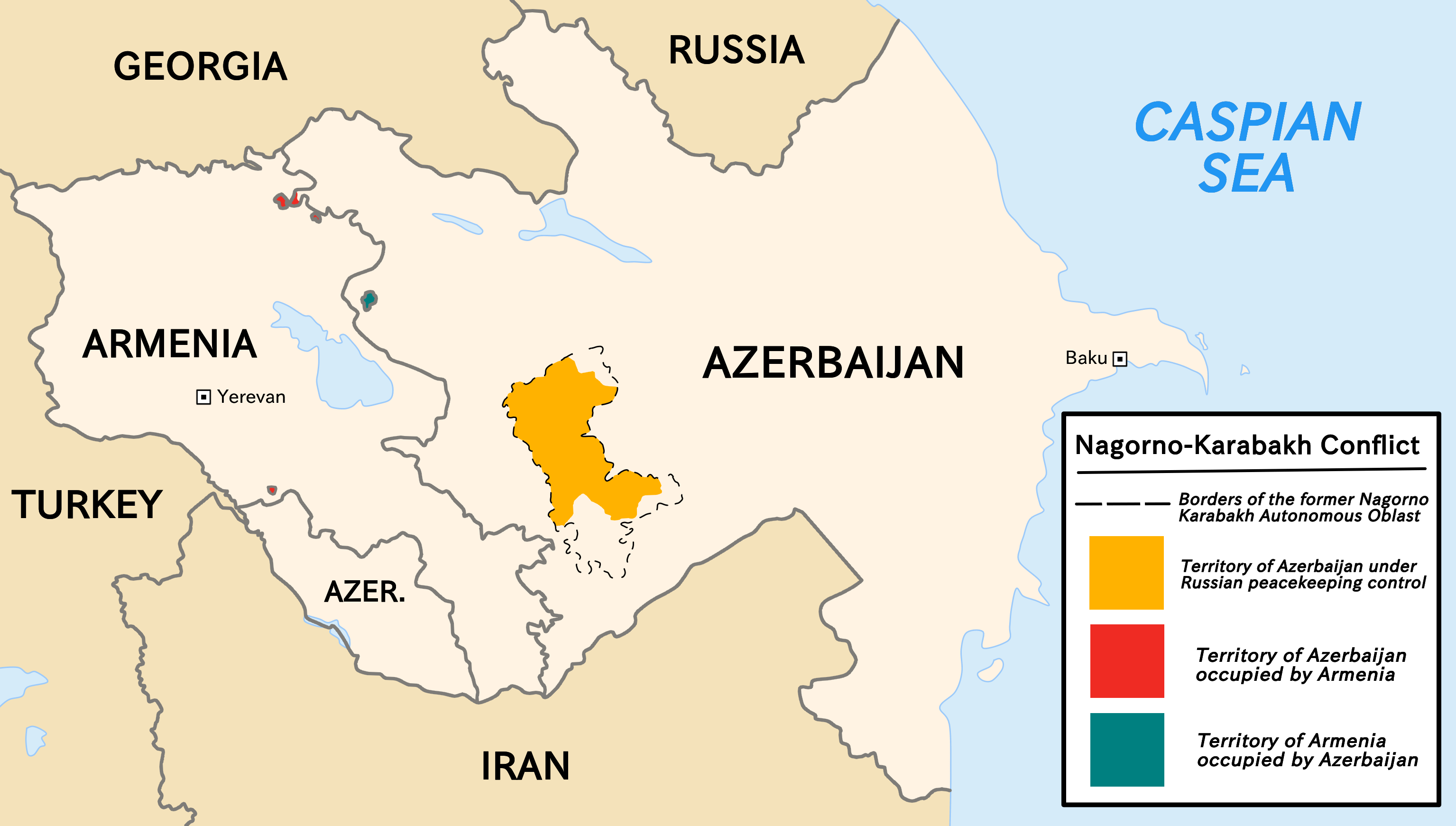
- Military situation in the region before 20 September 2023. For a detailed map, see here
Date	20 February 1988 – present (38 years, 8 months, 1 week and 4 days): Guerrilla warfare: 1988–1991; First Nagorno-Karabakh War: 1992–1994; Low-intensity conflict: 1994–2020; Second Nagorno-Karabakh War: 2020; Low-intensity conflict: 2020–2023; Azerbaijani offensive: 2023
Location	Nagorno-Karabakh Line of Contact, Armenia–Azerbaijan border
Status	Armenian victory: 1994; Blockade of Armenia: 1989–present; Political stalemate and cold war: 1994–2020; Azerbaijani victory: 2020; Border crisis: 2021–present; Blockade of Artsakh: 2022–2023; Azerbaijani victory: 2023; Disbandment of the Artsakh Defence Army: 2023; Expulsion of Nagorno-Karabakh Armenians (2023); Artsakh dissolved: 1 January 2024; Armenia–Azerbaijan peace agreement initialed on 8 August 2025, awaiting signing and final ratification
Territorial changes	Azerbaijan gained control over all of Nagorno-Karabakh

Belligerents
Artsakh (Nagorno-Karabakh; until 2023) (Note: Formal dissolution on 1 January 2024) (Note: Nagorno-Karabakh Autonomous Oblast (NKAO) until 1991.); Armenia (Note: Armenian Soviet Socialist Republic (Soviet Armenia) until 1990 (renamed Republic of Armenia)/1991 (declared independence).); Military support Foreign fighters Arms suppliers Diplomatic support	Azerbaijan (from 1991); Soviet Union (until 1991) (Note: "Throughout the Soviet period, Moscow supported the Azerbaijani authorities against Armenian secessionists." "Until the dissolution of the USSR, the Soviet authorities sided, in general, with Azerbaijan. [...] Soviet troops sent to the conflict area [...] on numerous occasions, took the side of the Azerbaijani forces to 'punish' the Armenians for raising the NK issue." "Soviet troops have been in Nagorno-Karabakh for 2 1/2 years [...] The troops support armed Azerbaijani militias who have imposed a blockade of the region..." Soviet troops directly intervened during Operation Ring in April–May 1991 on the Azerbaijani side. It was essentially a "combined Soviet-Azerbaijan operation."); Azerbaijan SSR; Turkey (2020) (alleged by Armenia); Foreign fighters; Arms suppliers; Diplomatic support

Units involved
Artsakh Defence Army (until 2023); Armenia Armed Forces	Azerbaijan Armed Forces; Soviet Armed Forces (until 1991)

Strength
2018: 65,000 (active servicemen) (Note: Armenia: 44,800 active servicemen (2019, IISS) Artsakh: 18,000–20,000 active servicemen (2008, ARAG)); 1993–1994: 30,000–40,000	2019: 66,950 (active servicemen); 1993–1994: 42,000–56,000

Casualties and losses
- 28,000–38,000 killed (1988–1994); 3,000 killed (May 1994 – August 2009); 541–547+ killed (2010–2019); 7,717 killed (2020); 44 killed (2021–2022)

The Nagorno-Karabakh conflict (Note: Also called the Karabakh conflict, Armenia–Azerbaijan conflict, or Armenian–Azerbaijani conflict. Usually referred to as the Artsakh conflict in Armenia and the Armenia-Azerbaijan Nagorno-Karabakh conflict in Azerbaijan.) is an ethnic and territorial conflict between Armenia and Azerbaijan over the region of Nagorno-Karabakh, inhabited mostly by ethnic Armenians until their expulsion in 2023, and seven surrounding districts, inhabited mostly by Azerbaijanis until their expulsion during the 1990s. The Nagorno-Karabakh region was entirely claimed by and partially controlled by the breakaway Republic of Artsakh, but was recognized internationally as part of Azerbaijan. Azerbaijan gradually re-established control over Nagorno-Karabakh region and the seven surrounding districts.

Throughout the Soviet period, Armenians in the Nagorno-Karabakh Autonomous Oblast were heavily discriminated against. The Soviet Azerbaijani authorities suppressed Armenian culture and identity in Nagorno-Karabakh, pressured Armenians to leave the region, and encouraged Azerbaijanis to settle within it, although Armenians remained the majority population. Motivated by fears of cultural and physical erasure under government policies from Azerbaijan, the Karabakh Movement advocated for the reunification ("miatsum") of the enclave with Soviet Armenia. A referendum in 1988 was held to transfer the region to Soviet Armenia, citing self-determination laws in the Soviet constitution. (Note: According to the Constitution of the USSR, if a union republic voted to leave the Soviet Union, its autonomous republics, autonomous oblasts, and autonomous okrugs had the right to hold their own referendums to independently decide whether to remain in the USSR or to leave alongside the seceding union republic. They also had the right to raise questions regarding their own state-legal status.) The Karabakh Movement was met with a series of pogroms against Armenians across Azerbaijan, before violence committed against both Armenians and Azerbaijanis occurred.

The conflict escalated into a full-scale war in the early 1990s following the dissolution of the Soviet Union. The war was won by Artsakh and Armenia, and led to occupation of regions around Soviet-era Nagorno-Karabakh. Azerbaijan and Turkey responded with a transportation and economic blockade of Armenia which persists to this day, while Artsakh was also blockaded until 2023. There were expulsions of ethnic Armenians from Azerbaijan and ethnic Azerbaijanis from Armenia and the Armenian-controlled areas. The ceasefire ending the war, signed in 1994 in Bishkek, was followed by two decades of relative stability, which significantly deteriorated in the 2010s. A four-day escalation in April 2016 resulted in hundreds of casualties but only minor changes to the front line.

In late 2020, the large-scale Second Nagorno-Karabakh War resulted in thousands of casualties and a significant Azerbaijani victory. The hostilities subsided with a tripartite ceasefire agreement, under which Azerbaijan captured one-third of Nagorno-Karabakh and regained control over the occupied territories surrounding the region. Ceasefire violations in Nagorno-Karabakh and on the Armenian–Azerbaijani border continued following the 2020 war. Between 2022 and 2023, Azerbaijan escalated its blockade of Nagorno-Karabakh using a military checkpoint, sabotaging civilian infrastructure, and targeting agricultural workers. The ten-month-long military siege isolated the region from the outside world. In September 2023, Azerbaijan launched a large-scale military offensive, expelled the entire population, dissolved the government of Artsakh, and incorporated the territory into Azerbaijan. In August 2025, Azerbaijan and Armenia signed a US-brokered peace agreement in Washington, DC, aiming to end the conflict, reopen transport routes, and normalize relations. Barriers to a comprehensive and lasting settlement include Azerbaijan’s denial of the right of return for displaced Armenians, disputes over Armenians detained, and Azerbaijan's demands that Armenia concede an extraterritorial transit corridor and amend its constitution and national symbols.

== Background ==
Following the breakup of the Russian Empire, the Armenians of Nagorno-Karabakh formed an unrecognised polity known as the Karabakh Council in 1918. Due to Azerbaijani–British pressure, the Karabakh Council in August 1919 was forced to provisionally recognise the authority of Azerbaijan, pending the Paris Peace Conference's adjudication of the international borders of the republics within the South Caucasus. As the peace conference was inconclusive regarding Nagorno-Karabakh, the Azerbaijani governor-general Khosrov bey Sultanov, issued an ultimatum to the Armenians of Karabakh in early 1920, stipulating their acceptance of permanent inclusion into Azerbaijan. Leaders associated with the Republic of Mountainous Armenia and the Dashnak Party attempted to organize a rebellion against Azerbaijani rule, which failed and led to the massacre and displacement of Shusha's Armenian population. (Note: According to the Caucasian Calendar for 1917, in 1916 Shusha had an Armenian population of 23,396, forming 53.3% of the city's population.) By 1921, Soviet authorities were in control of Nagorno-Karabakh who decided on the formation of the Nagorno-Karabakh Autonomous Oblast (NKAO) within Soviet Azerbaijan.

In 1964, the Armenians of Karabakh sent a letter to leader of the USSR, Nikita Khrushchev, complaining about Azerbaijan's economic management of the region. They also requested that the NKAO and adjacent regions where the Armenian population is approximately 90% be reincorporated into the Armenian SSR or integrated into the RSFSR. The Nagorno-Karabakh Armenian intellectuals who wrote to the Kremlin were imprisoned, put under surveillance, or forced to leave Nagorno-Karabakh. All lost their jobs and were removed from the Communist Party.

I tried to change the demographics in Karabakh. We encouraged Azeris living in neighbouring regions to move to Karabakh instead of to Baku. I made efforts to ensure that there would be more Azerbaijanis and less Armenians living there.

— Heydar Aliyev in a 2002 interview.

Throughout the Soviet period, Azerbaijani authorities implemented policies aimed at diluting the Armenian majority in Nagorno-Karabakh through various means, including border manipulations, encouraging the exodus of Armenians, and settling Azerbaijanis in the region. Census data from the Soviet period reflects these demographic shifts. Shusha—once a major center of Armenian cultural life—became overwhelmingly Azerbaijani. In the 1920s, Armenians constituted 94.4% of Nagorno-Karabagh’s population, with only 5.6% being Azerbaijani; by 1979, Armenians' share had fallen to 76%, while the share of Azerbaijanis had increased to 24%.

This discrimination against the Armenian population was part of a part of a broader strategy to suppress Armenian culture and identity in Nagorno-Karabakh. Former Azerbaijani President Heydar Aliyev later admitted to supporting some of these policies. Teaching Armenian history in Nagorno-Karabakh was banned. Nagorno-Karabakh Armenians were persecuted for choosing to attend college in Armenia instead of Azerbaijan or for supporting the FC Ararat Yerevan football club instead of Neftchi Baku. The 1973 Soviet Top League final in which Ararat Yerevan defeated FC Dynamo Kyiv was not aired in Azerbaijan SSR, and Nagorno-Karabakh Armenians that listened to the match by radio were arrested and questioned by the KGB. Despite these pressures, Armenians remained the majority in Nagorno-Karabakh when the USSR collapsed.

Amid Mikhail Gorbachev's reforms the dissolution of the Soviet Union in 1988–89, a 1988 Nagorno-Karabakh referendum was held to transfer the region to Soviet Armenia, citing self-determination laws in the Soviet constitution. In response, a series of pogroms were committed against Armenians throughout Azerbaijan, leading to the start of the Nagorno-Karabakh War. Professor Matt Qvortrup considered it hypocritical that Western Europe countries had eagerly recognised the succession of several states from Yugoslavia, ignoring the laws of territorial integrity, but simultaneously did not show the same interest for the Nagorno-Karabakh referendum, noting "the practice of independence referendums seemingly owes more to national interest than to adherence to principles of jurisprudence".

According to Stuart Kaufman, a professor of political science and international relations, and de Waal, the first instance of violence in the conflict occurred in October 1987 when an Azerbaijani official "punished" the Armenian-populated village of Chardakhly with a raid for protesting against the appointment of a new collective-farm director. During the raid, the village's women, children, and elderly were beaten up. In his 2003 book Black Garden, de Waal speculated that "[p]ossibly in reaction to such incidents", Azerbaijanis in Armenia (specifically in the districts of Ghapan and Meghri) were in November 1987 driven out of their homes, arriving at Baku in two freight cars. A number of Armenian scholars and investigative journalists, however, have scrutinized these alleged incidents and argued that, outside the claims made by Azerbaijani officials, there is no evidence, archival or otherwise, to corroborate such instances of mass violence taking place, at least prior to February 1988.

== Timeline ==
=== First Nagorno-Karabakh War (1988–1994) ===
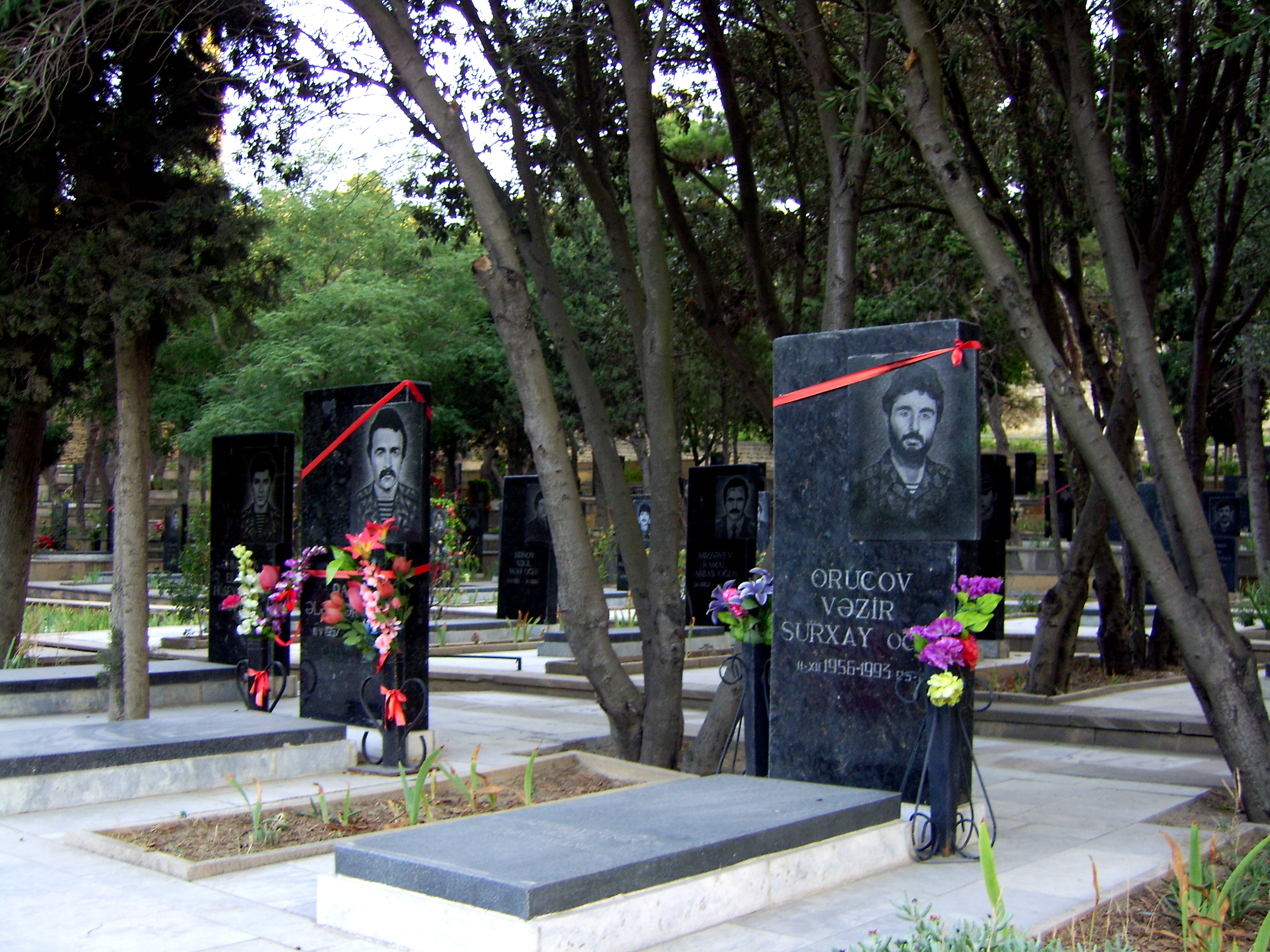
Graves of Azerbaijani soldiers

The First Nagorno-Karabakh War, also known as the Artsakh Liberation War in Armenia and Nagorno-Karabakh, was an armed conflict that took place in the late 1980s to May 1994, in the enclave of Nagorno-Karabakh in southwestern Azerbaijan, between the majority ethnic Armenians of Nagorno-Karabakh backed by the Republic of Armenia, and the Republic of Azerbaijan. As the war progressed, Armenia and Azerbaijan, then both former Soviet Republics, entangled themselves in a protracted, undeclared war in the mountainous heights of Karabakh as Azerbaijan attempted to curb the Armenian Karabakh movement.

On 20 February 1988, the enclave's parliament voted 110-17 in favor of uniting with Armenia. The demand to unify with Armenia, which began anew in 1988, began in a relatively peaceful manner. As the Soviet Union's dissolution neared, the tensions gradually grew into an increasingly violent conflict between ethnic Armenians and ethnic Azerbaijanis. Both sides made claims of ethnic cleansing and pogroms conducted by the other.

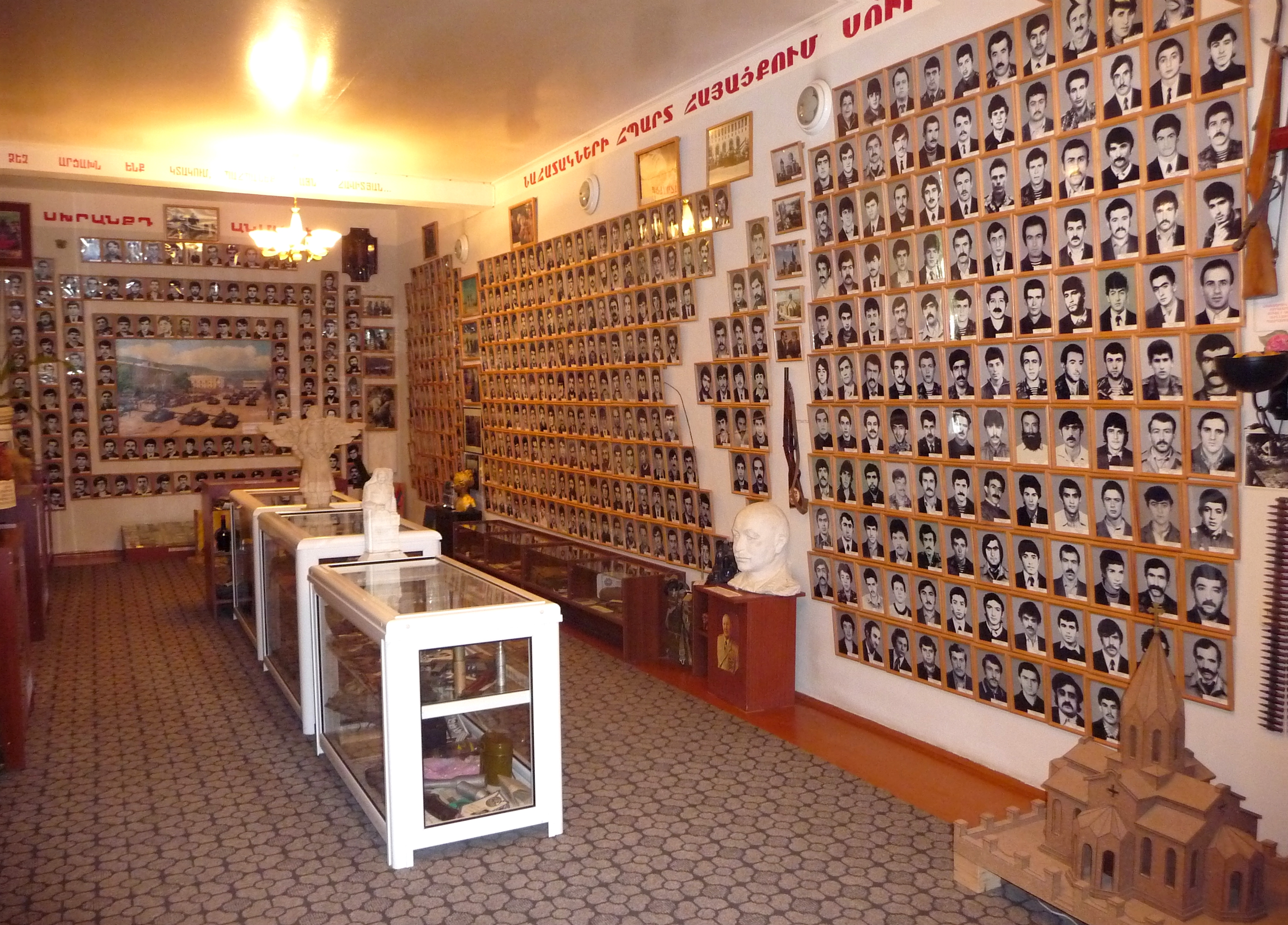
Photos of fallen Armenian soldiers in Stepanakert, Nagorno Karabakh

The circumstances of the dissolution of the Soviet Union facilitated an Armenian secessionist movement in Soviet Azerbaijan. As Azerbaijan declared its independence from the Soviet Union and removed the powers held by the enclave's government, the Armenian majority of Nagorno-Karabakh voted to secede from Azerbaijan. The referendum held in 1991 was boycotted by the Azerbaijani population and had an electorate turnout of 82.1%, of which 99.9% voted in favor of independence. The referendum resulted in the unrecognized Republic of Nagorno-Karabakh.

Full-scale fighting erupted in the late winter of 1992. International mediation by several groups, including the Organization for Security and Co-operation in Europe (OSCE), failed to bring resolution. In the spring of 1993, Armenian forces captured territory outside the enclave itself, threatening to catalyze the involvement of other countries in the region. By the end of the war in 1994, the Armenians were in full control of most of the enclave and also held and currently control approximately 9% of Azerbaijan's territory outside the enclave. An estimated 353,000 Armenians from Azerbaijan and 500,000 Azerbaijanis from Armenia and Nagorno-Karabakh were displaced as a result of the conflict. A Russian-brokered ceasefire was signed in May 1994, leading to diplomatic mediation.

=== Border clashes (2008–2020) ===
The situation in the area after the 1994 ceasefire

The 2008 Mardakert clashes began on 4 March after the 2008 Armenian election protests, resulting in several score wounded and killed, with both sides declaring victory. It was the heaviest fighting between ethnic Armenian and Azerbaijani forces since the 1994 ceasefire after the First Nagorno-Karabakh War. Following the incident, on 14 March the United Nations General Assembly by a recorded vote of 39 in favour to 7 against adopted Resolution 62/243, demanding the immediate withdrawal of all Armenian forces from the occupied territories of Azerbaijan. The 2010 Nagorno-Karabakh clash was a scattered exchange of gunfire that took place on 18 February on the line of contact dividing Azerbaijani and the Karabakh Armenian military forces. As a result, three Azerbaijani soldiers were killed and one wounded. The 2010 Mardakert clashes were the deadliest for Armenian forces since the 2008 violence. Between 2008 and 2010, 74 soldiers were killed on both sides.

In late April 2011, border clashes left dead three Artsakh Defence Army soldiers, while on 5 October, two Azerbaijani and one Armenian soldier were killed. In all during the year, 10 Armenian soldiers were killed. The following year, continued border clashes between the armed forces of Armenia and Azerbaijan took place from late April through early June. The clashes resulted in the deaths of five Azerbaijani and four Armenian soldiers. In all during 2012, approximately 20 Azerbaijani and 14 Armenian soldiers were killed. Throughout 2013, 12 Azerbaijani and 7 Armenian soldiers were killed in border clashes.

The breakaway republics of Abkhazia, South Ossetia and Nagorno-Karabakh within the Caucasus region, between 2008 and 2020

In 2014, several border clashes erupted. By August, 27 Azerbaijani soldiers had died since the start of the year. On 12 November 2014, the Azerbaijani armed forces shot down a Nagorno-Karabakh Defense Army Mil Mi-24 helicopter over Karabakh's Agdam district. With the crash, 2014 became the deadliest year for Armenian forces since the 1994 ceasefire agreement, with 27 soldiers killed. Six Armenian civilians also died in 2014, while by the end of the year the number of Azerbaijanis killed rose to 39 (37 soldiers and 2 civilians). In 2015, 42 Armenian soldiers and 5 civilians were killed as border clashes continued. In addition, at least 64 Azerbaijani soldiers also died, according to Armenian sources.

Over the years, propelled by oil and gas revenues, Azerbaijan embarked in a military build-up. In 2015 alone, Baku spent US$3 billion on its military, more than Armenia's entire national budget.

In early 2016, the most serious clashes until the 2020 war occurred (the 2016 Nagorno-Karabakh conflict). Between 1 and 5 April 2016, heavy fighting along the Nagorno-Karabakh frontline left 88 Armenian and 31–92 Azerbaijani soldiers dead. One Armenian and three Azerbaijani soldiers were also missing. In addition, 10 civilians (six Azerbaijani and four Armenian) were also killed. During the clashes, an Azerbaijani military helicopter and 13 unmanned drones were shot down and an Azerbaijani tank was destroyed, while Nagorno-Karabakh lost 14 tanks.

Continued clashes occurred in 2018. Three civilian volunteers were killed in a demining operation in Nagorno-Karabakh on 29 March 2018. 2020 saw a number of clashes, particularly heavy in July (July 2020 Armenian–Azerbaijani clashes).

=== Second Nagorno-Karabakh War (2020) ===
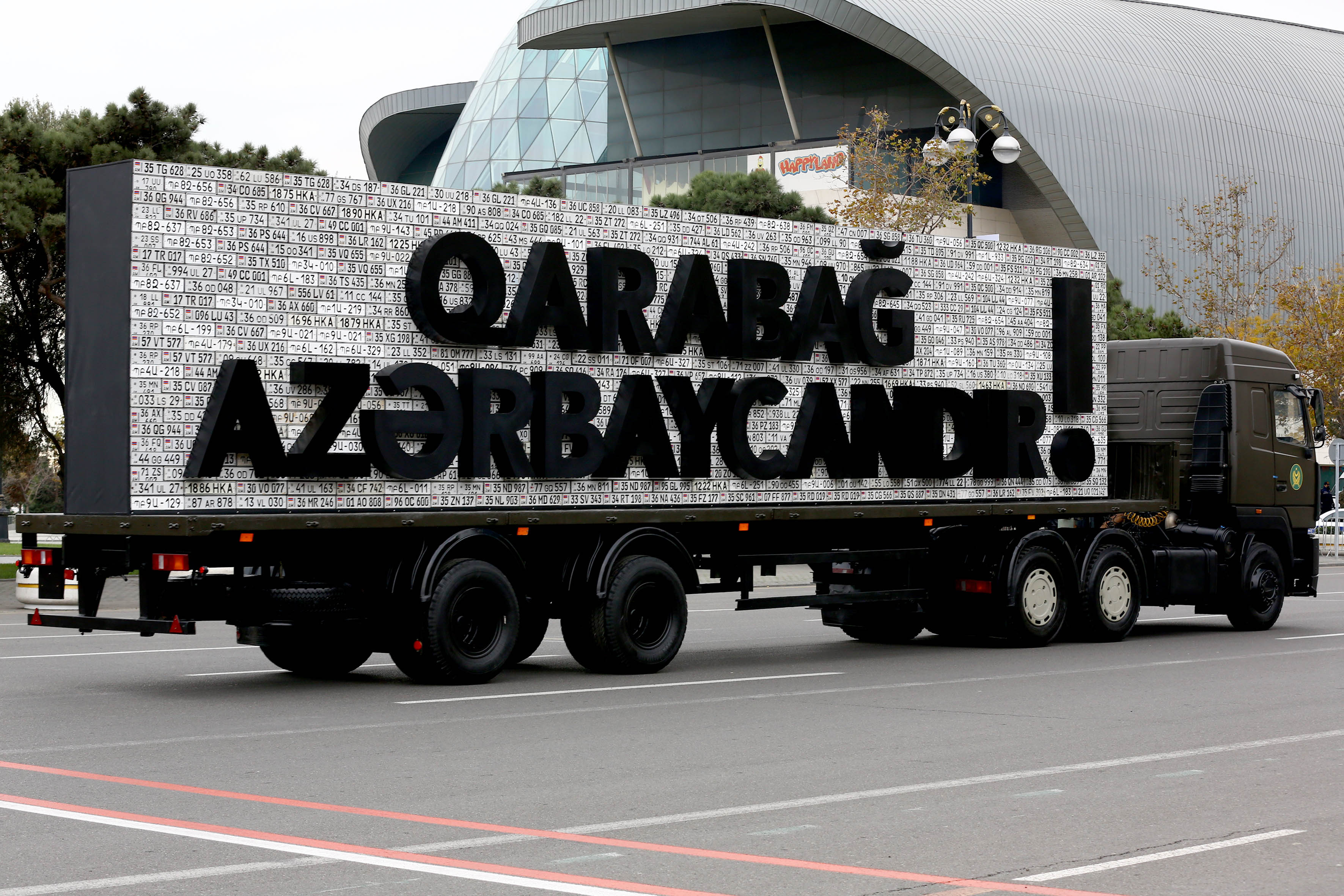
A truck with the slogan "Karabakh is Azerbaijan" at the Baku Victory Parade on 10 December 2020. The parade was held in honor of the Azeri victory in the 2020 conflict.

Large-scale fighting began on the morning of 27 September, with an Azerbaijani offensive along the line of contact established in the aftermath of the first war. Clashes were particularly intense in the less mountainous districts of southern Nagorno-Karabakh. On the same day, Azerbaijan's Parliament declared a martial law and established curfews in several cities and regions following the clashes. Turkey provided military support to Azerbaijan, although the extent of this support is disputed.

The war was marked by the deployment of drones, sensors, long-range heavy artillery and missile strikes, as well as by state propaganda and the use of official social media accounts in online information warfare. Azerbaijan's widespread use of drones was seen as crucial in determining the conflict's outcome. Numerous countries and the United Nations strongly condemned the fighting and called on both sides to de-escalate tensions and resume meaningful negotiations. Three ceasefires brokered by Russia, France, and the United States failed to stop the conflict.

Following the capture of Shusha, the second-largest city in Nagorno-Karabakh, a ceasefire agreement was signed, ending all hostilities in the area from 10 November 2020. Following the end of the war, an unconfirmed number of Armenian prisoners of war were captive in Azerbaijan, with reports of mistreatment and charges filed against them, leading to a case at the International Court of Justice.

Map of the 2020 Nagorno-Karabakh ceasefire agreement

Casualties were high. According to official figures released by the belligerents, Armenia and Artsakh lost 3,825 troops, with 187 servicemen missing in action, while Azerbaijan claimed 2,906 of their troops were killed, with 6 missing in action. The Syrian Observatory for Human Rights reported the deaths of 541 Syrian fighters or mercenaries fighting for Azerbaijan. However, it was noted that the sides downplayed the number of their own casualties and exaggerated the numbers of enemy casualties and injuries.

The total number of reported civilian fatalities on both sides was at least 185; the whereabouts of 21 Armenian civilians remain unknown. Civilian areas, including major cities, were hit, particularly Stepanakert, Martuni, Martakert, Shushi in the Republic of Artsakh and Ganja, Barda and Tartar in Azerbaijan, with many buildings and homes destroyed.

=== Border tensions (2021–present) ===
==== Border crisis (2021–present) ====
An ongoing border crisis started on 12 May 2021, when Azerbaijani soldiers crossed several kilometers into Armenia in the provinces of Syunik and Gegharkunik, occupying between 50 and 215 square kilometers. Azerbaijan has not withdrawn its troops from internationally recognised Armenian territory despite calls to do so by European Parliament, United States and France – two of the three co-chairs of the OSCE Minsk Group.

Following the end of the Second Nagorno-Karabakh War, Azerbaijan has made numerous incursions into Armenian territory and has regularly violated the ceasefire agreement, provoking cross-border fights with Armenia. In order to strengthen the border against Azerbaijan's military incursions, Armenia allocated additional defense areas to border guards of the Russian Federal Security Service.

The crisis escalated in July 2021, with clashes taking place on the Armenia–Nakhchivan border, and in November 2021 in the Gegharkunik–Kalbajar area. In August 2021, Azerbaijani forces blockaded southern Armenia (Syunik) by closing the main north-south highway which interrupted all international transit with Iran and forced Armenia to develop alternative roads.

Although the mission has been condemned by Azerbaijan and Russia, the EU has sent a CSDP civilian monitoring mission to Armenia to contribute to stability along the border and deter offensives by Azerbaijan. The president of Azerbaijan, Ilham Aliyev, has made numerous threats to Armenia, making statements such as "Armenia must accept our conditions" if Armenians wish to "live comfortably on an area of 29,000 square kilometers," and "they must not forget that Armenian villages are visible from here."

The largest escalation occurred in September 2022, when Azerbaijan initiated its largest attack on the Republic of Armenia in the history of the conflict between the two countries. Since Azerbaijan's offensives, Armenia's borders with Azerbaijan have become militarized which has disrupted the livelihoods of residents in border communities: residents have been targeted and could no longer access farmlands, schools, water resources, relatives, or religious sites. Fearing for their safety, many Armenian villagers have moved away permanently.

Armenia has unsuccessfully requested that the Collective Security Treaty Organization (CSTO) and Russia independently intervene due to Azerbaijan's military incursions in May 2021 and September 2022. The CSTO and Russia declined to provide assistance both times.

==== Blockade of Nagorno-Karabakh (2022–2023) ====
On 12 December 2022, under the guise of "environmental protests", Azerbaijan launched an illegal blockade of Nagorno-Karabakh. The Azerbaijani government sent citizens claiming to be "eco-activists" to block the Lachin corridor, the only road connecting Artsakh to Armenia and to the outside world. Civil servants, disguised military personnel, members of pro-government NGOs, and youth organisations were among the so-called "eco-activists." Only Azerbaijani journalists from state or pro-government media were permitted past checkpoints into the region.

From 26 March to 30 September 2023, the Azerbaijani government consolidated its blockade: seized strategic ground around the Lachin corridor both within Artsakh and Armenia, installed a military outpost that blocked a bypass dirt road that provided relief, blocked the old section of the Lachin corridor, and installed a checkpoint at the new section. Azerbaijan has ignored calls from the Russian peacekeepers to observe the 2020 ceasefire conditions and return to their initial territorial positions. Azerbaijan has also ignored calls from the International Court of Justice, the European Court of Human Rights, and other human rights organizations to restore freedom of movement across the Lachin corridor.

The blockade had severe consequences for the population: importation of food, fuel, and medicine was blocked, and the 120,000 residents of the region were trapped, which created a humanitarian crisis. Shortages of food, medicine, and electricity were widespread with emergency reserves were rationed, along massive unemployment and school closures.

During the blockade, Azerbaijan has deliberately damaged or cut various critical civilian infrastructure which supplied Artsakh: including gas, electricity, and Internet. The region was without gas from 22 March to 30 September 2023 and Artsakh authorities have resorted to daily 6-hour blackouts in order to ration the limited local electricity production, as Azerbaijan has prevented repair of a damaged supply line.

Azerbaijani President Aliyev has said that "Armenians living in Karabakh must either accept Azerbaijani citizenship or look for another place to live" and has threatened military action.

Local Armenian residents feared that the blockade aimed to expel them from their homeland and various human rights organizations and scholars specializing in genocide studies have warned of genocide risk factors.

=== 2023 offensive and expulsion of Armenians ===
On 19 September 2023, Azerbaijan launched a military offensive on Nagorno-Karabakh. One day after the offensive started, on 20 September, an agreement on establishing a complete cessation of hostilities in Nagorno-Karabakh was reached at the mediation of the Russian peacekeeping command in Nagorno-Karabakh. Azerbaijan held a meeting with representatives of the Artsakh Armenian community on 21 September in Yevlakh and a further meeting took place the following month. Ceasefire violations by Azerbaijan were nonetheless reported by both Artsakh and local residents in Stepanakert on 21 September.

Following the military offensive, Azerbaijan expelled the entire Armenian population, dissolved the government of Artsakh, and incorporated Nagorno-Karabakh into Azerbaijan.

=== Azerbaijani resettlement ===
Following the Azerbaijani reconquest of the region and the expulsion of Nagorno-Karabakh Armenians, Azerbaijan implemented a program to settle Azerbaijanis in the previously-Armenian-inhabited areas.

== Fatalities ==
=== 1988–1994 ===
An estimated 28,000–38,000 people were killed between 1988 and 1994.

Armenian military fatalities were reported to be between 5,856 and 6,000, while 1,264 Armenian civilians were also killed. Another 196 Armenian soldiers and 400 civilians were missing. According to the Union of Relatives of the Artsakh War Missing in Action Soldiers, as of 2014, 239 Karabakhi soldiers remain officially unaccounted for.

Azerbaijan stated 11,557 of its soldiers were killed, while Western and Russian estimates of dead combatants on the Azerbaijani side were 25,000–30,000. 4,210 Azerbaijani soldiers and 749 civilians were also missing. The total number of Azerbaijani civilians killed in the conflict is unknown, although 167–763 were killed on one day in 1992 by the Republic of Nagorno-Karabakh's forces.

=== 1994–2019 ===
Although no precise casualty figures exist, between 1994 and 2009, as many as 3,000 people, mostly soldiers, had been killed, according to most observers. In 2008, the fighting became more intense and frequent. With 72 deaths in 2014, the year became the bloodiest since the war had ended. Two years later, between 1 and 5 April 2016, heavy fighting along the Nagorno-Karabakh front left 91 Armenian (11 non-combat) and 94 Azerbaijani soldiers dead, with two missing. In addition, 15 civilians (nine Armenians and six Azerbaijanis) were killed.

Azerbaijan stated 398 of its soldiers and 31 civilians were killed between 1994 and up to September 2020, right before the start of the 2020 conflict. In comparison, the Caspian Defense Studies Institute NGO reported 1,008 Azerbaijani soldiers and more than 90 civilians were killed between 1994 and 2016.

Year	Armenia	Azerbaijan	Total
2008	N/A	N/A	30 soldiers
2009	N/A	N/A	19 soldiers
2010	7 soldiers	18 soldiers	25 soldiers
2011	10 soldiers	4+ soldiers, 1 civilian	14+ soldiers, 1 civilian
2012	14 soldiers	20 soldiers	34 soldiers
2013	7 soldiers	12 soldiers	19 soldiers
2014	27 soldiers, 6 civilians	37 soldiers, 2 civilians	64 soldiers, 8 civilians
2015	42 soldiers, 5 civilians	64 soldiers	77 soldiers, 5 civilians
2016	108–112 soldiers, 9 civilians	109 soldiers, 6 civilians	217–221 soldiers, 15 civilians
2017	22 soldiers	19 soldiers	41 soldiers
2018	5–7 soldiers	6 soldiers	11–13 soldiers
2019	4 soldiers	6+ soldiers	10+ soldiers

=== 2020–2023 ===
Between January and September 2020, 16 Azerbaijani and 8 Armenian soldiers, as well as an Azerbaijani civilian, were killed in sporadic clashes.

The Second Nagorno-Karabakh War occurred between 27 September and 10 November 2020. According to Azerbaijan, the fighting left 2,906 Azerbaijani soldiers and 100 civilians dead, while six servicemen were still missing. Armenian authorities stated the fighting had left 3,825 Armenian soldiers and 85 civilians dead, while 187 servicemen and 21 civilians were still missing. Additionally, the Syrian Observatory for Human Rights documented the deaths of 541 Syrian mercenaries fighting for Azerbaijan. Two Russian soldiers were also killed when their helicopter was shot down by Azerbaijan by accident while flying in Armenian airspace near the border. In addition, a 13-year-old Russian citizen was killed during an Armenian missile strike on the city of Ganja. In the two-month period fighting, thousands were killed, primarily soldiers, but also an estimated two hundred civilians. Following the end of the war, eleven more Azerbaijani soldiers, six Azerbaijani civilians and one Russian peacekeeper were killed in clashes and landmine explosions in the region by the end of 2020.

Twelve Azerbaijani civilians and two soldiers were killed in 2021 by landmine explosions. Seventeen Armenian and ten Azerbaijani soldiers were also killed in shoot-outs in the border area, while 38 Armenian soldiers were captured. Twenty-eight of the captured Armenian soldiers were subsequently released in December 2021.

In 2022, three Armenian soldiers were killed and 14 wounded in an attack by Azerbaijani drones in Nagorno-Karabakh on 25 March.

During the 2023 Azerbaijani offensive in Nagorno-Karabakh, over 190 Azerbaijani and 190 Artsakh soldiers were killed. 5 Russian peacekeepers were also killed. Subsequently, over 100,000 ethnic Armenian inhabitants of Nagorno-Karabakh were expelled from the region.

== Foreign involvement ==
=== Countries ===
==== Russia ====
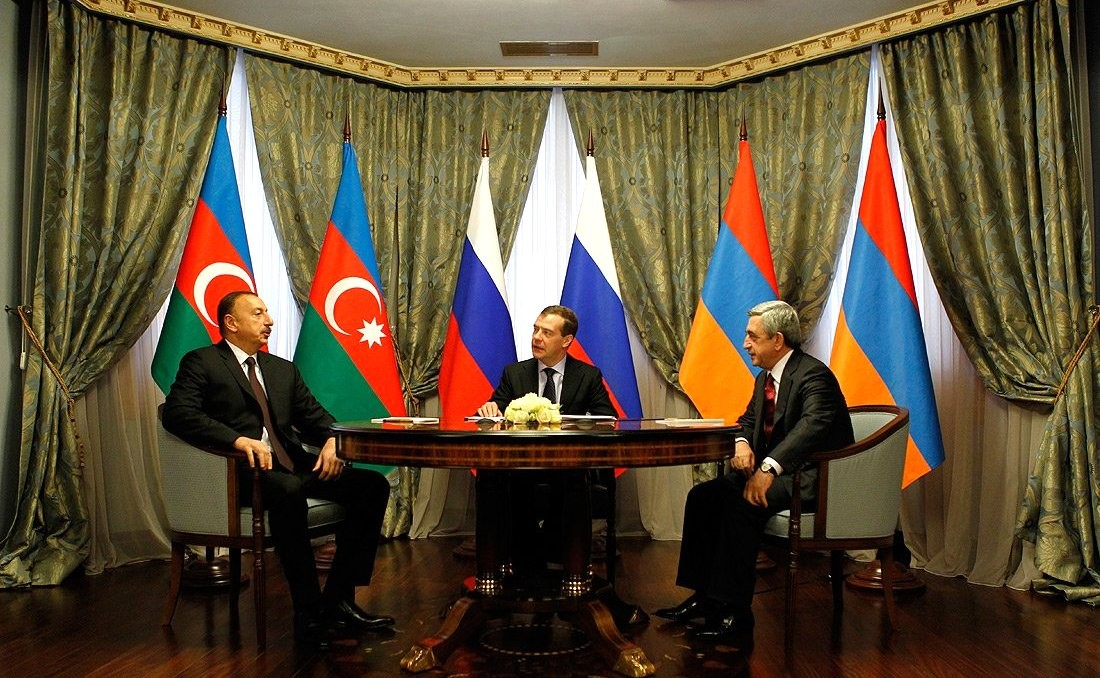
Azerbaijani President Ilham Aliyev, Russian President Dmitry Medvedev and Armenian President Serzh Sargsyan on 23 January 2012

Russia is officially neutral and has sought to play the role of a mediator. In its official statements, Russia calls for a peaceful settlement and restraint during skirmishes. British journalist Thomas de Waal has argued that there is an Azerbaijani narrative that Russia has "consistently supported the Armenian side." According to de Waal, Russia "has more supported the Armenian side," but there have been various "different Russian actors at different times supporting both sides in this conflict." He argues that President Boris Yeltsin did not "want to see the Armenian side be defeated, but he also didn't want to supply them with too many weapons." De Waal concluded in 2012 that "Russia [is] playing both sides", but "ultimately more in the Armenian side." Other commentators have argued that Russia plays both sides in the conflict. Svante Cornell argued in 2018 that Russia "had been playing both sides of the Armenia–Azerbaijan conflict to gain maximum control over both, a policy that continues to this day."

During the first Nagorno-Karabakh War, Russia was widely viewed as supporting the Armenian position due to it providing Armenia with military assistance, including arms and indirect logistical support. Russia supplied around $1 billion worth of weapons and, thus, "made a vital contribution to the Armenian victory." According to de Waal, "greater Russian support for the Armenians" was one of the main factors behind the Armenian victory. De Waal notes, "Yet it is not entirely clear how this support for the Armenians was translated on to the battlefield; to complicate things further, the Russians also gave some assistance to Azerbaijan."

Following the first Nagorno-Karabakh War and up until 2022, Russia was Armenia's main arms supplier and the two countries are military allies. Russia is sometimes described as Armenia's supporter in the conflict, however, this view is widely challenged as Russia extensively sells arms to Azerbaijan. Also, in February 2022, Aliyev and Putin signed a "Declaration of Allied Interaction" which elevated military ties between their countries and affirms "mutual respect for ... [the] territorial integrity and inviolability of the borders of the two countries" and obliges Azerbaijan and Russia to "refrain from any actions, including those carried out through third states, directed against each other." The agreement also has provisions for joint military operations and assistance between Russian and Azerbaijan, including personnel training and production, maintenance, repair, and modernization of military equipment. However, up until 2022 Armenia purchased Russian weaponry at a discount, while Azerbaijan pays the full price. In 2022, Russia suspended arms deliveries to Armenia.

==== Turkey ====
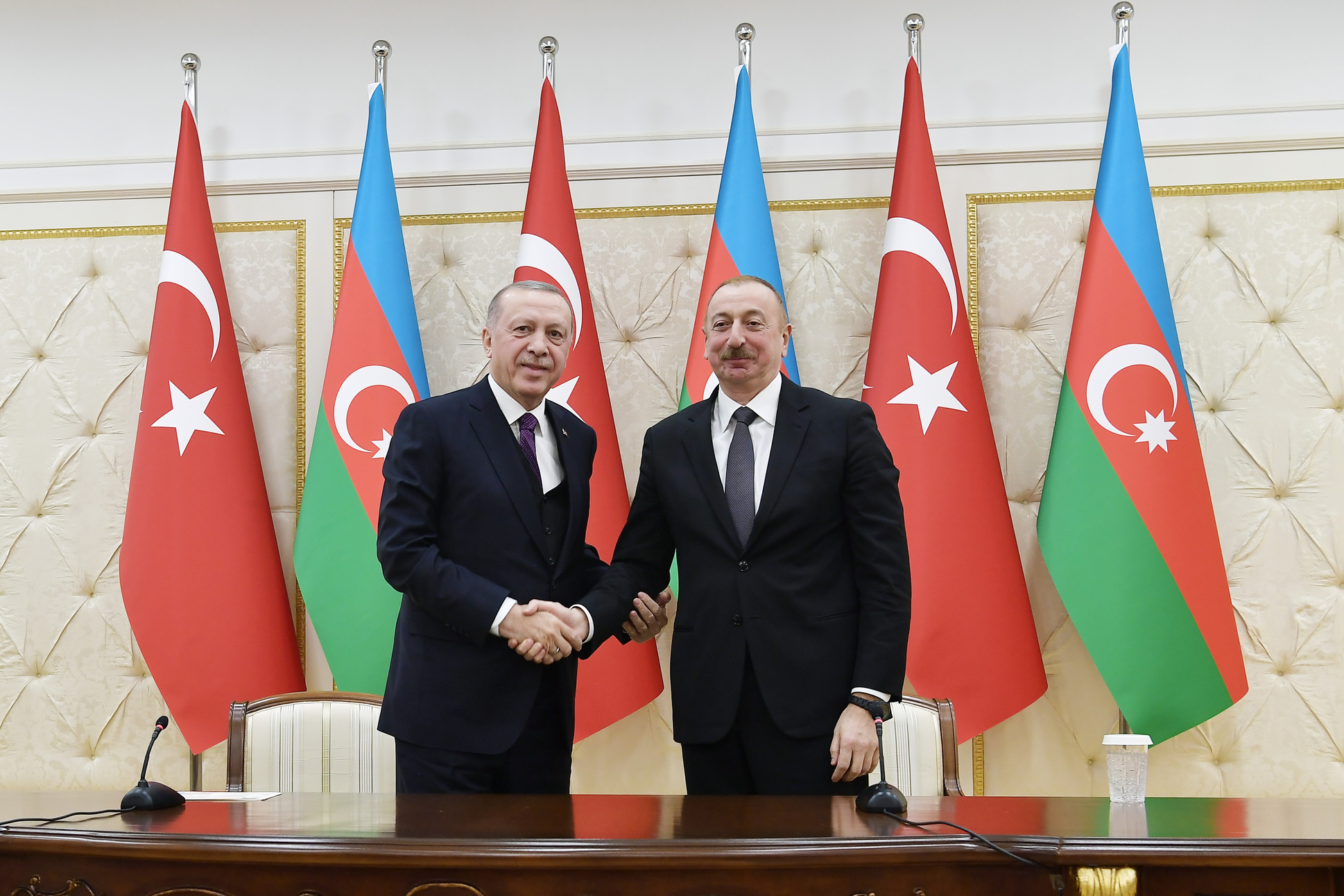
Ilham Aliyev and Turkish President Recep Tayyip Erdoğan on 25 February 2020

Turkey is widely considered Azerbaijan's main supporter in the conflict. Svante Cornell wrote in 1998 that Turkey is the "only country that constantly expressed its support for Azerbaijan." It provided Azerbaijan "active military help" during the war. Turkey also supports Azerbaijan diplomatically. Turkish and Azerbaijani armed forces cooperate extensively and regularly hold military exercises. Azerbaijan has also bought weapons from Turkey.

Turkey closed its border with Armenia in April 1993 after Armenian forces captured Kalbajar. Prior to that, the border was only open "on demand and only for transferring the humanitarian aid (mainly wheat delivery) to Armenia and for the operation of the weekly Kars-Gyumri train, which had been crossing the Turkish–Armenian border since the days of the Soviet Union." Turkey has repeatedly refused to normalize and establish diplomatic relations with Armenia in solidarity with Azerbaijan over Karabakh. Turkey and Azerbaijan signed the "Shusha Declaration" in Shusha, a city that Azerbaijan captured during the Second Nagorno-Karabakh War. The declaration reaffirmed the military and economic cooperation between the countries and Turkish President Erdogan said the opening of a Turkish consulate in Shusha "would be a message to the world and especially to Armenia."

==== Iran ====
Iran is officially neutral and has sought to play the role of a mediator, most notably in 1992. In its official statements, Iran calls for a peaceful settlement and restraint during skirmishes. At the same time, Iranian officials have repeatedly reaffirmed their support for Azerbaijan's territorial integrity. (Note: These include, among others, President Mohammad Khatami in 2004, Chief of Staff of Iran's Armed Forces Mohammad Bagheri in 2019, Chief of Staff of the President of Iran Mahmoud Vaezi in 2020, and Iran's ambassadors in Azerbaijan.) Deputy Foreign Minister Abbas Araghchi stated in 2020 that "While respecting the territorial integrity of the Azerbaijan Republic, Iran is fundamentally opposed to any move that would fuel conflict between the two neighbouring countries of the Azerbaijan Republic and Armenia."

During the war, "Iran was domestically torn in devising a policy", but de facto "pursued a policy that combined official neutrality with growing support for Armenia," according to Svante Cornell. Cornell argues that Iran has "pursued policies in the conflict inclined towards Armenia." However, Iran's tacit support for the Armenian side was limited to economic cooperation. Terhi Hakala noted in 1998 that "as a geopolitical counter-weight to Turkey, Iran has strongly supported Armenia, especially by alleviating the effects of the Turkish blockade." Cornell notes that during the war, Iran served as Armenia's "main purveyor of electricity and goods, and once the Armenian conquest of Karabakh had been completed, Iranian trucks began to supply most of the secessionist enclave's needs." According to Bahruz Balayev, "Iran supported the territorial integrity of Azerbaijan and gave some humanitarian aid to the [Azerbaijani] refugees, but in the meantime widely cooperates with Armenia and even Karabakh Armenian authorities." Brenda Shaffer wrote that "Iran's cooperation with Armenia and its tacit support in the conflict with Azerbaijan over Karabagh strengthened Yerevan's actual and perceived power and consequently may have lessened its sense of urgency to resolve the conflict."

In 2013, Mohsen Rezaee, who was commander of the Islamic Revolutionary Guard Corps (IRGC) during the war, claimed that he "personally issued an order [...] for the Republic of Azerbaijan army to be equipped appropriately and for it to receive the necessary training." Rezaee added that "Many Iranians died in the Karabakh War. In addition to the wounded, who were transported to [Iran], many of the Iranian martyrs of the Karabakh War are buried in Baku." In 2011, Hassan Ameli, a leading Iranian cleric, claimed that Iran provided Azerbaijan with arms and helped the Afghan mujaheddin move to Azerbaijan. The Iranian embassy in Armenia stated that they would not like unreliable information to affect friendly Armenian-Iranian relations: "We do not exclude the possibility that there are forces, which aim to create hindrances for our friendly relations." In October 2020, several protests erupted in Iranian cities, including the capital Tehran and Tabriz, in support of Azerbaijan, with many Iranian Azerbaijanis chanting pro-Azerbaijan slogans and protesting Iran's alleged arms support to Armenia via the Nordooz border crossing.

==== United States ====
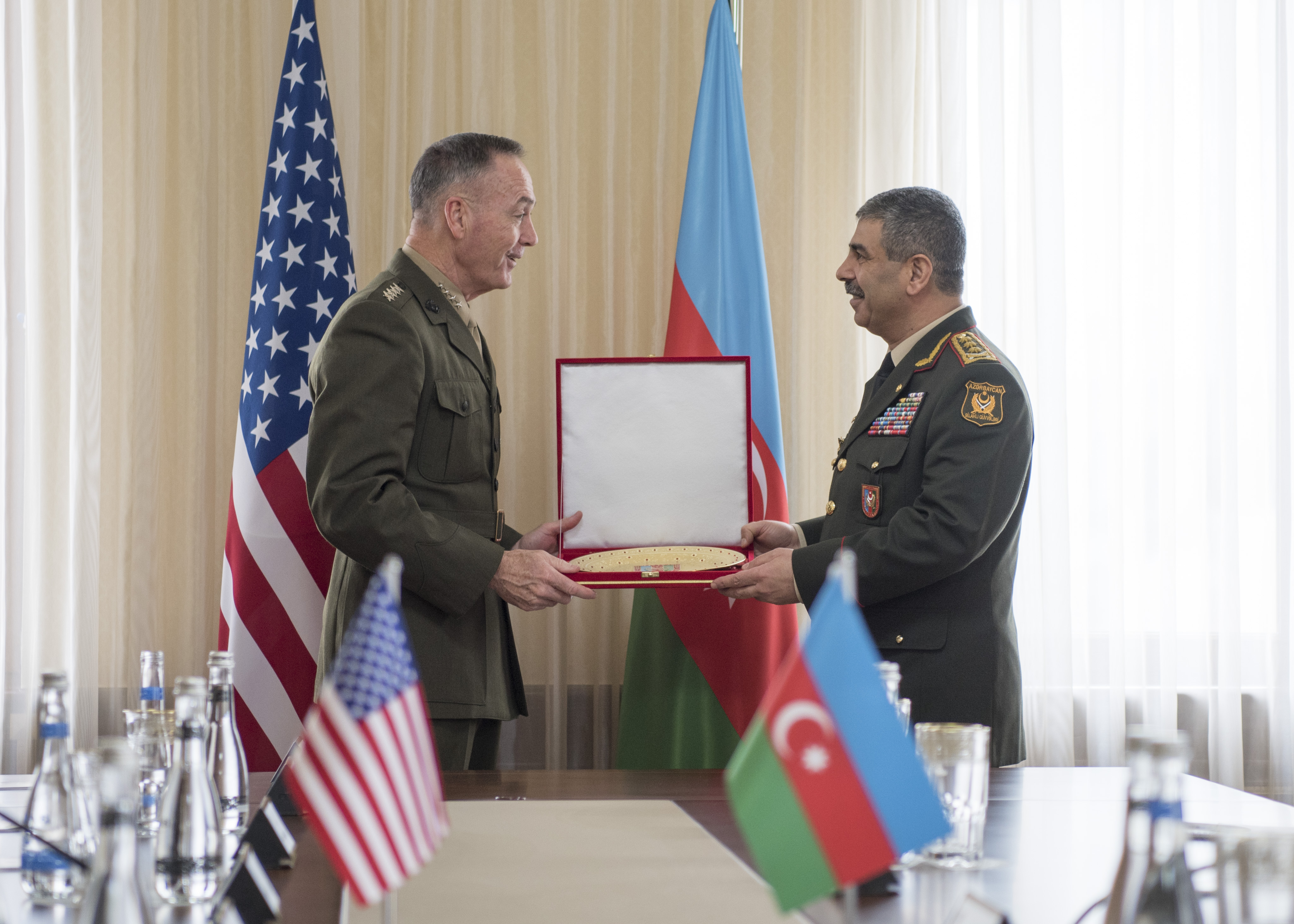
Joseph Dunford, chairman of the Joint Chiefs of Staff, with Azerbaijani Minister of Defense Zakir Hasanov on 16 February 2017

Thomas Ambrosio suggested in 2000 that the US "supported Azerbaijan's territorial integrity, but enacted policies that effectively supported Armenia's irredentist policies." Sergo Mikoyan argued in 1998 that the US response to the conflict has been "inconsistent, pulled in different directions by the legislative and executive branches of power." Congress was under the influence of the Armenian lobby, while the executive branch (the White House and the State Department) pursued a pro-Azerbaijani policy, which "reflects Turkish influence and the interests of oil companies." Richard C. Longworth and Argam DerHartunian expressed similar views.

Congress's pro-Armenian position was expressed in passing the Section 907 of the Freedom Support Act in 1992, which banned any assistance to Azerbaijan. It was effectively amended by the Senate in 2001 and waived by President George W. Bush starting from 2002. The US provides military aid to both countries. Between 2005 and 2016 Azerbaijan received $8.5 million for counternarcotics assistance and $11.5 million for counterterrorism aid. In the same period, Armenia received only $41,000 for counternarcotics assistance and none for counterterrorism aid. According to EurasiaNet, "Much of the money for Azerbaijan has been targeted toward naval forces, to reduce the risk that it could be used against Armenia." The Trump administration greatly increased the US military aid to Azerbaijan to around $100 million in fiscal years 2018–19, compared to less than $3 million in a year in FY 2016–17. The US aid is primarily "offered in the context of U.S. policy to increase pressure on Iran and focuses on Azerbaijan's Iranian border, but it also has implications for Armenia," according to Emil Sanamyan. In FY 2018, Armenia received $4.2 million in U.S. security assistance.

The US has also provided humanitarian aid to Artsakh (some $36 million between 1998 and 2010), including for demining. The humanitarian aid has been criticized by Azerbaijan for legitimizing the "illegal regime in the occupied lands and damages the reputation of the US as a neutral mediator."

=== Arms suppliers ===
In 1992, the OSCE "requested its participating states to impose an embargo on arms deliveries to forces engaged in combat in the Nagorno-Karabakh area." However, it is a "voluntary multilateral arms embargo, and a number of OSCE participating states have supplied arms to Armenia and Azerbaijan since 1992." The UN Security Council Resolution 853, passed in July 1993, called on states to "refrain from the supply of any weapons and munitions which might lead to an intensification of the conflict or the continued occupation of territory." According to SIPRI, "since 2002, the UN Security Council has no longer listed that it is 'actively seized of the matter'. As such, since 2002, it is assumed that the non-mandatory UN embargo is no longer active."

==== Armenia ====
Russia has long been Armenia's primary arms supplier. Smaller suppliers include China, India, Ukraine, Greece, Serbia, Jordan (per Armenian MoD sources, denied by Jordan). In March 1992, Yagub Mammadov, chairman of Azerbaijani parliament, accused Syria and Lebanon of supplying weapons to Armenia.

==== Azerbaijan ====
According to SIPRI, Russia supplied 55% of Azerbaijan's weaponry in 2007–11, 85% in 2010–14 and 31% in 2015–19. Israel has become a major supplier, accounting for 60% of Azerbaijan's arms imports in 2015–19. Azerbaijan's other suppliers include Turkey, Belarus, Canada (via Turkey), Ukraine, Serbia, and Czech Republic (denied by the Czech authorities).

=== Foreign fighters ===
Several foreign groups fought on both sides in the intense period of fighting in 1992–94. According to Human Rights Watch (HRW), both sides used mercenaries during the war, namely "Russian, Ukrainian, and Belorussian mercenaries or rogue units of the Soviet/Russian Army have fought on both sides."

==== Azerbaijan ====
Azerbaijan made extensive use of mercenary pilots. According to a 1994 report from Human Rights Watch, "Most informed observers believe that mercenaries pilot most of Azerbaijan's air force."

Several foreign groups fought on the Azerbaijani side: Chechen militants, Afghan mujahideen, members of the Turkish ultranationalist Grey Wolves, and the Ukrainian nationalist and neo-fascist UNA-UNSO. The Chechen fighters in Karabakh were led by Shamil Basayev, who later became Prime Minister of Ichkeria (Chechnya), and Salman Raduyev. Basayev famously participated in the battle of Shusha in 1992. Saudi-born Ibn al-Khattab may have also joined them. The Afghan mujahideen were mostly affiliated with the Hezb-e Islami, led by Afghan Prime Minister Gulbuddin Hekmatyar. According to HRW, they were "clearly not motivated by religious or ideological reasons" and were, thus, mercenaries. The recruitment of Afghan mujahideen, reportedly handled by paramilitary police chief Rovshan Javadov, was denied by Azerbaijani authorities. They first arrived to Azerbaijan in fall 1993 and numbered anywhere between 1,500 and 2,500 or 1,000 and 3,000. Armenia alleged that they were paid for by Saudi Arabia. Afghan mujahideen constituted the most considerable influx of foreign fighters during the war. Some 200 Grey Wolves were still present in the conflict zone as of September 1994 and were engaged in training Azerbaijani units.

==== Artsakh and Armenia ====
Some 85 Russian Kuban Cossacks and around 30 Ossetian volunteers fought on the Armenian side. In May 2011, a khachkar was inaugurated in the village of Vank in memory of 14 Kuban Cossacks who died in the war. Ossetian volunteers reportedly came from both South Ossetia (Georgia) and North Ossetia (Russia). No less than 12 diaspora Armenian volunteers fought and four diaspora fighters died in the war. According to David Rieff, members of the Armenian Revolutionary Federation (Dashnaks), "including a substantial number of volunteers from the diaspora, did a great deal of the fighting and dying." Former members of the Armenian Secret Army for the Liberation of Armenia (ASALA) also participated in the war.

=== Diplomatic support ===
==== Artsakh and Armenia ====
Artsakh (Nagorno-Karabakh Republic) received diplomatic recognition and diplomatic support, especially during the 2016 clashes, from three partially recognized states: Abkhazia, (Note: The political status of Abkhazia is disputed. Having unilaterally declared independence from Georgia in 1992, Abkhazia is formally recognised as an independent state by 4 UN member states (three other states previously recognised it but then withdrew their recognition), while the remainder of the international community recognizes it as de jure Georgian territory. Georgia continues to claim the area as its own territory, designating it as Russian-occupied territory.) South Ossetia, (Note: South Ossetia's status is disputed. It considers itself to be an independent state, but this is recognised by only a few other countries. The Georgian government and most of the world's other states consider South Ossetia de jure a part of Georgia's territory.) and Transnistria. (Note: Transnistria's political status is disputed. It considers itself to be an independent state, but this is not recognised by any UN member state. The Moldovan government and the international community consider Transnistria a part of Moldova's territory.)

During the war, Greece adopted a pro-Armenian position and supported it in international forums. During the April 2016 and July 2020 clashes, Cyprus condemned Azerbaijan for violating the ceasefire.

Armenian President Levon Ter-Petrosyan reportedly told the Greek ambassador in 1993 that France and Russia were Armenia's only allies at the time. According to a US State Department cable released in 2020, the French ambassador to the UN, Jean-Bernard Mérimée, succeeded in changing the wording of the UNSC Resolution 822 to state that it was "local Armenian forces", not "Armenian forces" that occupied Kalbajar. He also suggested treating the Armenian capture of Kalbajar not under Chapter VII of the UN Charter (an act of aggression), but Chapter VI (a dispute that should be settled peacefully).

==== Azerbaijan ====
Azerbaijan has received explicit diplomatic support in the conflict from several countries and international organizations. Azerbaijan's strongest diplomatic supporters are Turkey and Pakistan, which is the only UN member state not to have recognized Armenia's independence in support for Azerbaijan. Turkish-backed unrecognized Northern Cyprus (Turkish Cyprus) also supports Azerbaijan. The Organisation of Islamic Cooperation (OIC) and the Turkic Council have repeatedly supported the Azerbaijani position. Some member states of these organizations, namely Uzbekistan and Saudi Arabia have voiced support for Azerbaijan's position on their own repeatedly. Lebanon, on the other hand, has not supported OIC's pro-Azerbaijani resolutions.

Azerbaijan has received diplomatic support, namely for its territorial integrity, from three post-Soviet states that have territorial disputes: Ukraine, Georgia, and Moldova. These three countries and Azerbaijan form the GUAM organization and support the Azerbaijani position in the format as well. Serbia, with its own territorial dispute over Kosovo, also explicitly supports Azerbaijan's territorial integrity. Two other post-Soviet states, Kazakhstan and Belarus tacitly support Azerbaijan's position, especially within the Eurasian Economic Union (EEU) and the CSTO, despite nominal alliance with Armenia. Both Palestine and Israel have voiced support for Azerbaijan. China has supported Azerbaijan's position on Nagorno-Karabakh, which has been reciprocated by Azerbaijan's support of China on Taiwan.

==== 2008 UN vote ====
On 14 March 2008, the United Nations General Assembly adopted a resolution which "reaffirmed Azerbaijan's territorial integrity, expressing support for that country's internationally recognized borders and demanding the immediate withdrawal of all Armenian forces from all occupied territories there." It was adopted by a vote of 39 in favor to 7 against, while most countries either abstained or were absent. It was backed mostly by Muslim states (31 were members of the OIC). (Note: Afghanistan, Azerbaijan, Bahrain, Bangladesh, Brunei, Comoros, Djibouti, Gambia, Indonesia, Iraq, Jordan, Kuwait, Libya, Malaysia, Maldives, Morocco, Niger, Nigeria, Oman, Pakistan, Qatar, Saudi Arabia, Senegal, Sierra Leone, Somalia, Sudan, Turkey, Uganda, United Arab Emirates, Uzbekistan, Yemen.) Non-Muslim states that supported the resolution included three post-Soviet states: Georgia, Moldova, Ukraine, and five other nations: Cambodia, Colombia, Myanmar, Serbia, and Tuvalu. Thus, it was supported by seven OSCE members; (Note: Azerbaijan, Georgia, Moldova, Serbia, Turkey, Ukraine, Uzbekistan) one NATO member (Turkey) and no EU member state.

It was opposed by Angola, Armenia, France, India, Russia, the United States, and Vanuatu. The OSCE Minsk Group co-chair countries (France, US, Russia) voted against the resolution. They argued that it "selectively propagates only certain of [the basic] principles to the exclusion of others, without considering the Co-Chairs' proposal in its balanced entirety." The co-chair countries called it a unilateral resolution, which "threatens to undermine the peace process," but reaffirmed their "support for the territorial integrity of Azerbaijan, and thus do not recognize the independence of NK."

== Azerbaijani laundromat ==
In 2017, an Azerbaijani laundromat money-laundering scheme organized by Azerbaijan was revealed by the OCCRP. The report revealed that between 2012 and 2014, Azerbaijan created a slush fund of US$2.9 billion used to bribe European and American politicians, journalists, lawmakers, and academics to lobby for Azerbaijani interests abroad, including promoting a pro-Azerbaijan agenda for the Nagorno-Karabakh conflict. This form of bribery has been referred to as "caviar diplomacy". The laundering scheme has operated by wiring millions of euros into the private bank accounts of influential Western figures and by providing them with luxurious trips to Azerbaijan. The European Azerbaijani Society (TEAS) lobbying group has played a large role in this by hiring European PR professionals, pariliment members, and former ministers.

Azerbaijani-American businessman Adil Baguirov had been lobbying in Washington through secret funding from Azerbaijan’s state oil company since 2013. Baguirov runs the non-profit Houston-based US Azeris Network, which received a $253,150 transfer after organizing and hosting a conference in Baku attended by 10 American members of Congress. In 2003, Baguirov began working as Special Advisor on Russia and the former Soviet Union to Congressman Curt Weldon. Weldon and another Congressman, Solomon Ortiz, both founded the Congressional Azerbaijan Caucus in 2004. The Congressional Azerbaijan Caucus was a frequent recipient of Azerbaijani laundromat funds. From 2008 to 2016, Baguirov was invited almost annually by the United States House Appropriations Subcommittee on State, Foreign Operations, and Related Programs to suggest economic and military aid budgets for Azerbaijan and Armenia. In 2008, Baguirov lobbied for greater aid to be given to Azerbaijan, citing equity and neutrality. But by 2012, Baguirov lobbied for aid to Armenia to be reduced to zero, while requesting that Azerbaijan be granted $26 million from USAID and $3.9 million in military aid.

The 2012 laundromat investigation revealed several bank transfers in 2012, totalling more than US$9 million, made to the Hungarian MKB Bank account in Budapest right around the time when, amid international controversy, the Hungarian government extradited the convicted Azerbaijani murderer Ramil Safarov to Azerbaijan. Several media outlets suggested a connection between Viktor Orbán's visit to Baku in June and the first instalment of $7.6 million transferred to the bank account in July, since by the end of August Safarov was handed over to Azerbaijan.

In 2017, following a series of critical reports and concern expressed by many members of the Parliamentary Assembly of the Council of Europe (PACE), the Assembly's Bureau decided to set up an independent, external body to investigate allegations of corruption in PACE. The investigation body's final report was published in April 2018, finding "strong suspicions of corruptive conduct involving members of the Assembly" and naming a number of members and former members as having breached the Assembly's Code of Conduct. Many of the members or former members mentioned in the report were sanctioned: four members were deprived of certain rights and 14 members, accused of accepting gifts and bribes from the government of Azerbaijan, were expelled from the Assembly's premises for life. One named individual was German politician and former Parliamentary State Secretary Eduard Lintner. It was revealed Lintner had lobbied on behalf of the Azerbaijani government since as early as 2009 when he founded the Society for Promoting German-Azerbaijani Relations.

== Major ceasefire agreements and international mediation ==
Two major armistices occurred upon following the First and Second Nagorno-Karabakh War. Both ceasefires were brokered by Russia, with the first also being mediated by the OSCE Minsk Group (Russia, US, France).

=== Bishkek Protocol ===
A Russian-brokered ceasefire was signed in May 1994 and peace talks, mediated by the OSCE Minsk Group have been held ever since by Armenia and Azerbaijan. The 1994 Bishkek Protocol called for both sides to cease hostilities and engage in dialogue aimed at demilitarization of the region, return of refugees, and the creation of a CIS peacekeeping force. Azerbaijan has repeatedly accused the Minsk Group (Russia, US, France) of being pro-Armenian. In 1996, when France was chosen by the OSCE to co-chair the Minsk Group, Azerbaijan asked the OSCE to reconsider the decision because France was perceived by Azerbaijan as pro-Armenian. Svante Cornell argued in 1997 that France, the US and Russia are "more or less biased towards Armenia in the conflict." In 2018 Azerbaijan accused the US and France of bias for allowing Bako Sahakyan, the then president of Artsakh, to visit their countries.

=== 2020 ceasefire agreement ===
On 9 November 2020, Armenia and Azerbaijan signed a ceasefire under mediation from Russia, with the Republic of Artsakh also agreeing to end hostilities. According to the agreement, both sides retained control of the positions they held at midnight. Armenia returned the territories surrounding Nagorno-Karabakh that it had occupied since the 1990s. Azerbaijan also retained control over one-third of Nagorno-Karabakh proper that it had captured during the war: including Shusha and Hadrut. In total, the Armenian side lost roughly 75% of the territories in and around Nagorno-Karabakh that it controlled prior to the war. Until 2020, an independent Azerbaijan had never exercised de facto control over the region.

Approximately 2,000 Russian soldiers were deployed as peacekeeping forces around Nagorno-Karabakh with a mandate of at least five years. The peacekeepers were also given mandate over the Lachin corridor which following remains the only passage between Armenia and Nagorno-Karabakh. The alternative Vardenis–Martakert route has been closed by Azerbaijan since it took control of the Dadivank-Sotk section (in Kalbajar) during the Second Nagorno-Karabakh War (2020). As per the agreement, Armenia returned all territory it had occupied around Nagorno-Karabakh and Azerbaijan retained control over one-third of Nagorno-Karabakh proper that it captured. The 2020 agreement gave Russian peacekeepers a temporary but renewable mandate to the region.

Following the 2020 Nagorno-Karabakh War, both Russia and the European Union have increased their presence in Armenia along the border with Azerbaijan in order to improve stability of the border and deter offensives from Azerbaijan. Upon Armenia's request, Russia's Federal Security Service expanded its patrols within Armenia and the EU contributed a civilian monitoring mission. However, while both entities have deterred the possibility of full-scale warfare, they have been unable to fully prevent Azerbaijan's goals.

Russia and the European Union have criticized each other's presence within Armenia. The European Union encouraged Armenia to seek alternative security alliances given "Russia's alleged readiness to guarantee the security of Armenia has proven to be non-existent." Russia, in turn, criticized the EU and Armenia for implementing the civilian monitoring in Armenia and claims it is an effort by the West to diminish Russia's power in the region.

=== 2023 ceasefire agreement ===
A day after the resuming of hostilities, a ceasefire agreement was announced with the government of the Republic of Artsakh agreed to disarm and to enter into talks with the government of Azerbaijan regarding the reintegration of the territory.

=== 2024 Russian peacekeepers withdrawal ===
On 12 June 2024, the Russian peacekeepers completed their withdrawal from the Nagorno-Karabakh region which had started in April that year, following an agreement between President Putin and his Azerbaijani counterpart President Aliyev.

=== 2025 Armenia–Azerbaijan peace agreement ===
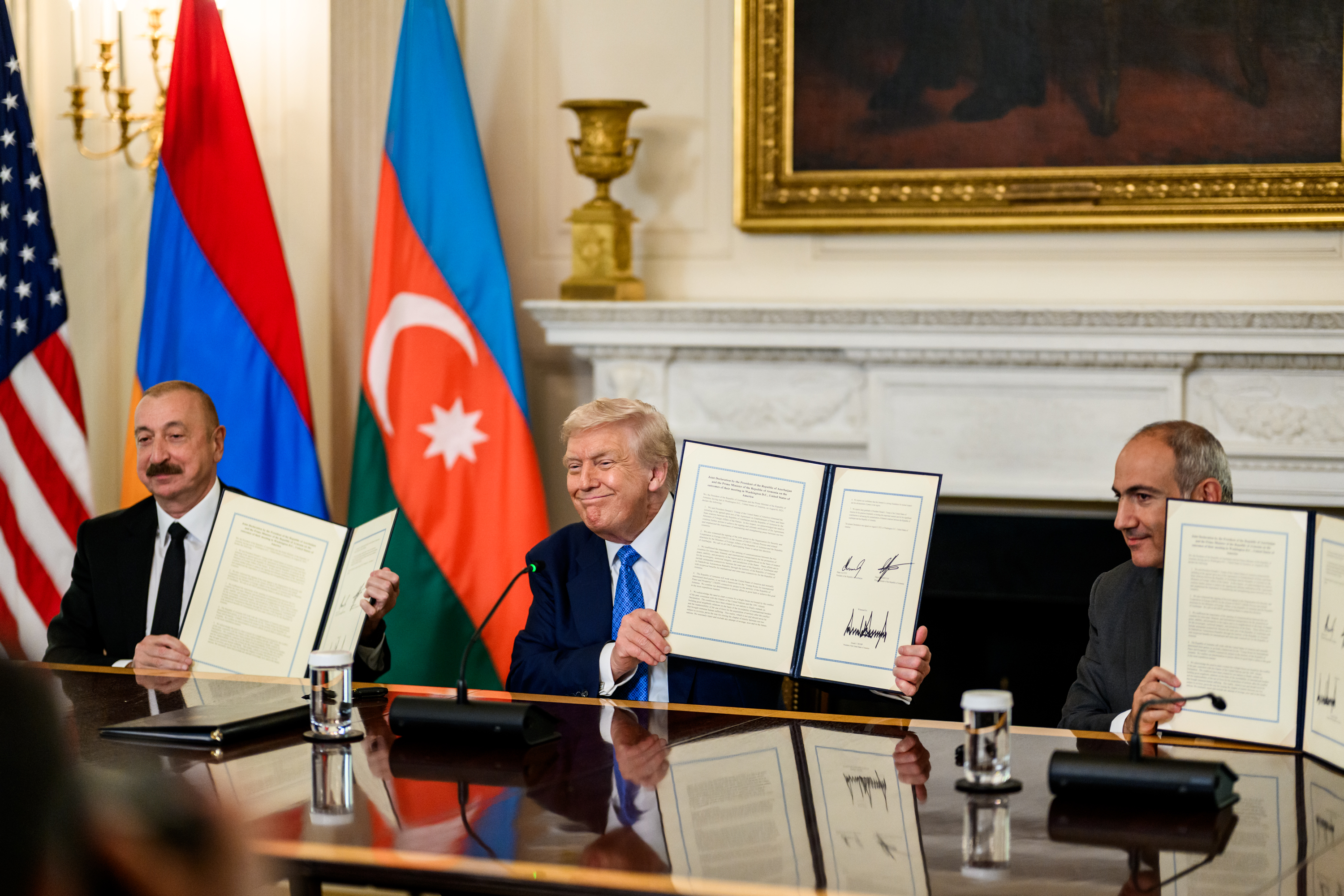
Azerbaijani President Ilham Aliyev, US President Donald Trump and Armenian Prime Minister Nikol Pashinyan signing a trilateral joint declaration in Washington, D.C., 8 August 2025

On 8 August 2025, Armenian Prime Minister Nikol Pashinyan and Azerbaijani President Ilham Aliyev signed a peace agreement in a ceremony hosted by US President Donald Trump in the White House, laying groundwork to end the more than 35-year conflict between Armenia and Azerbaijan.

A comprehensive settlement remains elusive due to certain elements: Azerbaijan’s refusal to guarantee the right of return for displaced Armenians, alongside ongoing disputes over detainees, including former Nagorno-Karabakh officials whose prosecution has drawn international criticism. Negotiations are further complicated by Azerbaijan’s demands that Armenia concede an extraterritorial transit corridor and amend its constitution and national symbols. Meanwhile, Armenia has not withdrawn international lawsuits against Azerbaijan.

== Political status ==
The political status of Nagorno-Karabakh remained unresolved from its declaration of independence from the Soviet Union in 1991 until its dissolution in 2024. Within the Soviet Union, the region was an ethnic Armenian autonomous oblast of the Azerbaijan Soviet Socialist Republic. From 1994 to 2024, the United Nations Security Council, OSCE Minsk Group, and other bodies made various statements and proposed dialogue initiatives; none of them successful. The Republic of Artsakh has not been recognized by any country, including Armenia, although international mediators and human rights organizations have emphasized self-determination for the local Armenian population, both as an internationally recognized right but also as a form of genocide prevention.

Following the 2020 Nagorno-Karabakh War, Azerbaijan has rescinded its offer of special status or autonomy to its ethnic Armenian residents and instead insisted on their "integration" into Azerbaijan. In 2023, Azerbaijani President Aliyev said that Armenian residents of Nagorno-Karabakh must be "reintegrated" as "normal citizen[s] of Azerbaijan" and that "the [special] status [for Armenians] went to hell. It failed; it was shattered to smithereens. It is not and will not be there. As long as I am president, there will be no status." Aliyev also threatened military action.

Despite being offered Azerbaijani citizenship, Artsakh residents did not trust Azerbaijan's guarantees of security due to the country's history of human rights abuses, Armenophobia and lack of rights to ethnic minorities. Various human rights observers, scholars specializing in genocide studies, and politicians considered the blockade of Artsakh a form of ethnic cleansing and warned of the risk of genocide. Many international observers also did not consider Azerbaijan's claim that Artsakh Armenians could live safely under Aliyev's regime to be credible.

Political analyst Eric Hacopian has said that "Expecting Armenians to submit to the rule of a nationalistic and undemocratic Azeri government] is the equivalent of asking 100,000 Israelis to live under Hamas." Caucasus expert Laurence Broers wrote "the blockade [of Nagorno-Karabakh] renders irrelevant any talk of the civil integration of Karabakh Armenians. It vindicates the worst fears of the Karabakh Armenian population." Political analysts predict that Azerbaijan would arbitrarily detain and torture civilians, under the pretext of their association with the Artsakh government or with previous wars, if it took control over the region. At least two incidents of Azerbaijani forces detaining Armenian residents around Azerbaijan's military checkpoint have been confirmed.

== See also ==
- Armenia–Azerbaijan border

== Bibliography ==
- Četerjan, Viken (2008). War and peace in the Caucasus: Russia's troubled frontier (1. ed.). London: Hurst. ISBN 978-1-85065-929-7.
- Chorbajian, Levon; Mutafian, Claude; Donabedian, Patrick (1994). The Caucasian Knot: The History and Geopolitics of Nagorno-Karabagh. Zed Books. ISBN 978-1-85649-288-1.
- de Waal, Thomas (2003). Black garden: Armenia and Azerbaijan through peace and war (1st ed.). New York: New York University Press. ISBN 978-0-8147-1945-9.
- Heß, Michael Reinhard (2016). Panzer im Paradies. Der Berg-Karabach-Konflikt zwischen Armenien und Aserbaidschan [Tanks in paradise. The Nagorno-Karabakh conflict between Armenia and Azerbaijan]. Berlin: Dr. Köster, ISBN 978-3-89574-906-3.
- Azerbaijan: Seven years of conflict in Nagorno-Karabakh (PDF). Human Rights Watch. 1994. ISBN 978-1-56432-142-8. Archived (PDF) from the original on 28 June 2020.
- Saparov, Arsène (2014). From Conflict to Autonomy in the Caucasus: The Soviet Union and the Making of Abkhazia, South Ossetia and Nagorno Karabakh. Routledge. doi:10.4324/9781315758992. ISBN 978-1-315-75899-2.
- Taarnby, Michael (2008). "The Mujahedin in Nagorno-Karabakh: A Case Study in the Evolution of Global Jihad". Working Paper. Madrid: Elcano Royal Institute: 1–12. Archived (PDF) from the original on 19 August 2020.
- Cornell, Svante E. (1998). "Turkey and the conflict in Nagorno Karabakh: a delicate balance". Middle Eastern Studies. 34 (1): 51–72. doi:10.1080/00263209808701209. ISSN 0026-3206. JSTOR 4283917.
