= 2020 bombardment of Martuni =

Bombardment by Azerbaijani forces

Bombardment of Martuni
- Part of Second Nagorno-Karabakh War
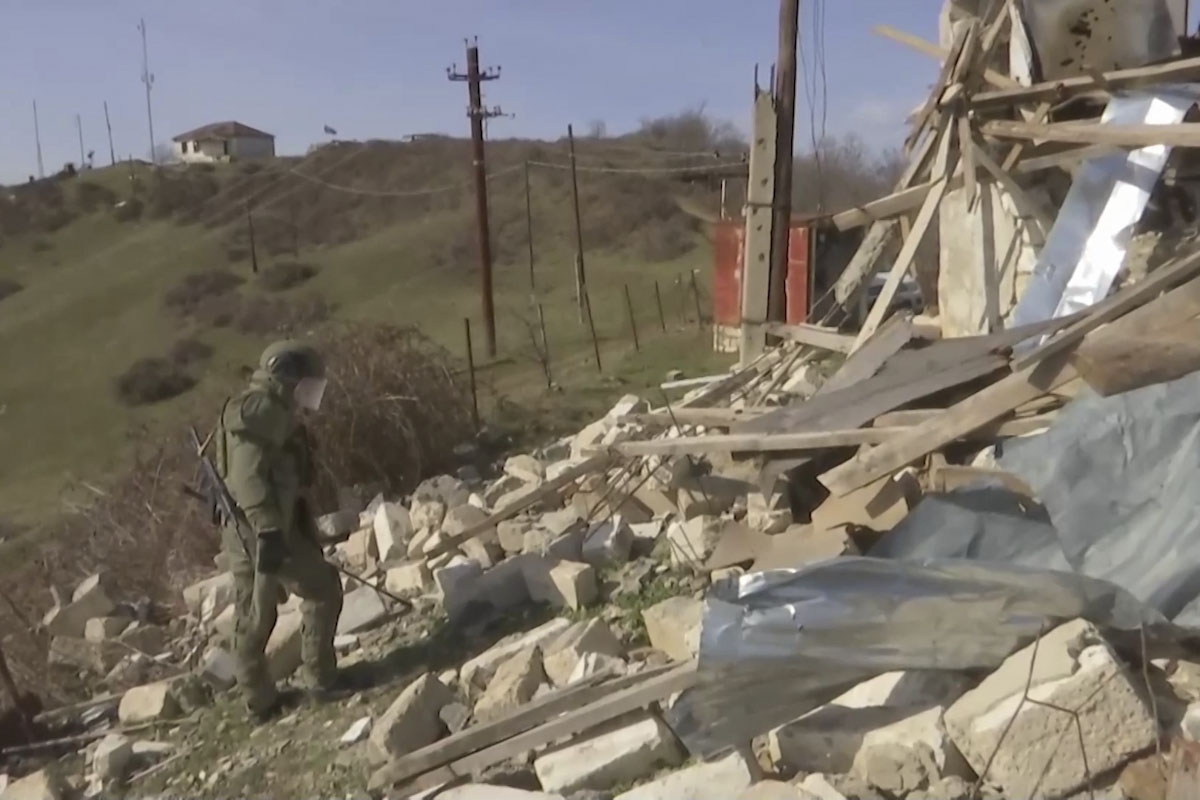
- Russian peacekeeper in the damaged city of Martuni
- Location: 39°47′43″N 47°06′47″E; Martuni, Nagorno-Karabakh
- Date: September 27, 2020- November 10, 2020 (1 month and 2 weeks) (GMT+4)
- Attack type: Bombardment; Shelling; Drone strikes Artillery salvos
- Weapon: BM-21 Grad; TOS-1
- Deaths: 5 (as of October 5, 2020)
- Injuries: 10 (as of October 5, 2020)
- Perpetrator: Azerbaijani Armed Forces
- 1,203 buildings damaged in the Martuni Province

The bombardment of Martuni (Armenian: Մարտունի բնակավայրի ռմբակոծություն) was the bombardment of the cities, towns, and villages in the Martuni Province of the self-proclaimed Republic of Artsakh, which is de jure a part of Azerbaijan. It was carried out by Azerbaijani Armed Forces during the Second Nagorno-Karabakh War. The city Martuni, along with the de facto capital Stepanakert, were badly damaged as a result of shelling. The shelling resulted in the deaths of five civilians. 1,203 buildings were damaged in the province as a result of the bombardment, according to Artsakh Urban Development Ministry. Victoria Gevorgyan, a resident of the Martuni Province of Nagorno-Karabakh, became the first child killed on the first day of the war.

== Background ==
The clashes were part of the Nagorno-Karabakh conflict over the disputed region of Nagorno-Karabakh with an ethnic Armenian majority. The region is a de jure part of Azerbaijan, but is mostly under the de facto control of the self-proclaimed Republic of Artsakh, which is supported by Armenia. Ethnic violence began in the late 1980s and exploded into a full war following the dissolution of the USSR in 1991. The war ended with a ceasefire in 1994, with the Republic of Artsakh controlling most of the Nagorno-Karabakh region, as well as the surrounding districts of Aghdam, Jabrayil, Fuzuli, Kalbajar, Qubadli, Lachin and Zangilan of Azerbaijan.

== Timeline ==
The shelling of Martuni began on 27 September 2020.

On 1 October 2020, the town of Martuni in Nagorno-Karabakh was subjected to artillery fire and bombardment by the Azerbaijani Armed Forces. The town was also shelled by multiple rocket launcher TOS-1, which hit residential buildings.

External videos
- Nagorno Karabakh. Martuni under Grad Shelling on YouTube

== Casualties ==
According to Head of Martuni regional administration of the Republic of Artsakh Edik Avanesyan, as of the beginning of October, 5 residents were killed and 10 residents were wounded in the city of Martuni. Infrastructure was also destroyed. Residents of Martuni were forced to hide in shelters.

== Reactions ==
=== Amnesty International ===
External videos
- Footage of bombardment in Martuni on YouTube

Following the 2020 Nagorno-Karabakh ceasefire agreement, Amnesty International visited strike sites in Armenia, Azerbaijan and Nagorno-Karabakh.

=== Human Rights Watch ===
Human Rights Watch and Armenian authorities stated that at least nine medical facilities were damaged in Martuni and other districts of Nagorno-Karabakh during the conflict.

== See also ==
- 2020 bombardment of Stepanakert
- 2020 Ghazanchetsots Cathedral shelling
