= 2020 bombardment of Stepanakert =

Part of the Second Nagorno-Karabakh War

Bombardment of Stepanakert
- Part of the Second Nagorno-Karabakh War
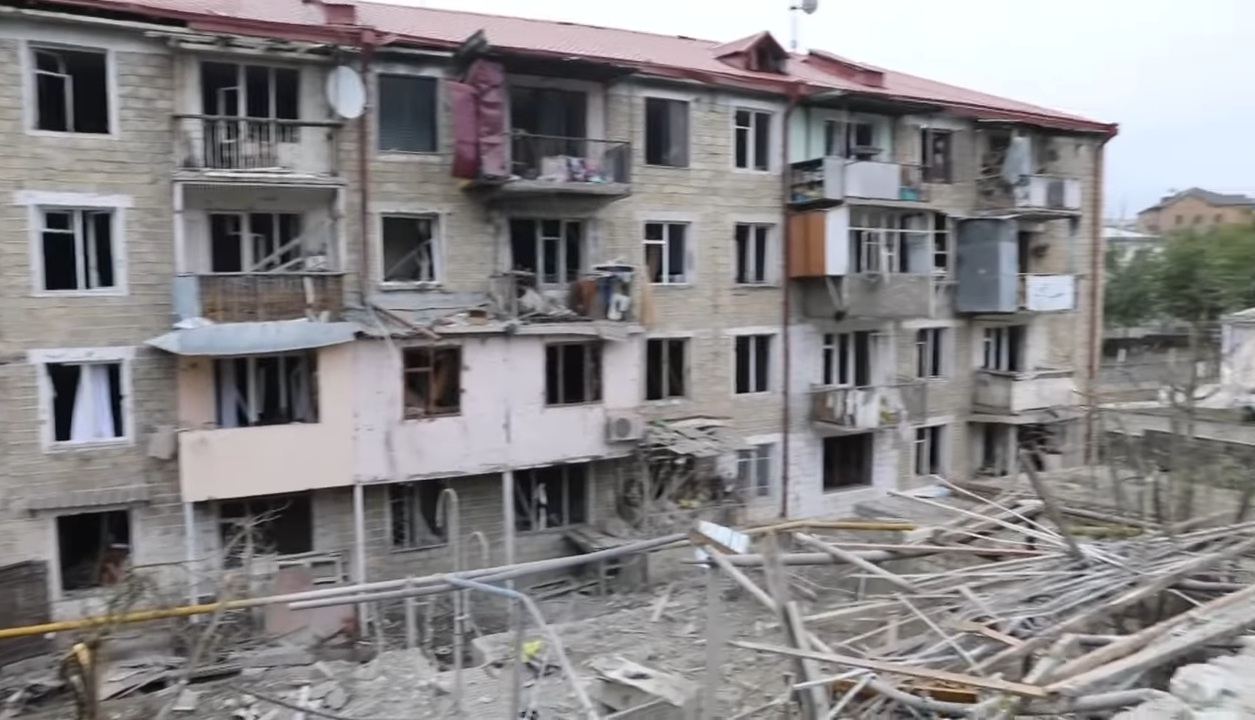
- Location: Stepanakert, Azerbaijan (de jure); Artsakh (de facto)
- Date: 27 September 2020 – 9 November 2020 (GMT+4)
- Attack type: Bombardment
- Deaths: 13
- Injuries: 51
- Perpetrator: Azerbaijani Armed Forces
- 4,258 buildings damaged throughout the course of the bombardment

The bombardment of Stepanakert (Armenian: Ստեփանակերտի ռմբակոծություններ) began on September 27, 2020, the first day of the Second Nagorno-Karabakh War, and lasted throughout the duration of the war. Stepanakert is the capital and largest city of the self-proclaimed Republic of Artsakh, internationally recognized as part of Azerbaijan, and was home to 60,000 Armenians on the eve of the war. Throughout the 6-week bombardment, international third parties consistently confirmed evidence of the indiscriminate use of cluster bombs and missiles by Azerbaijan against civilian areas lacking any military installations in Stepanakert; this was denied by Azerbaijan. The prolonged bombardment forced many residents to flee, and the rest to take cover in crowded bomb shelters, leading to a severe outbreak of the COVID-19 pandemic in the city, infecting a majority of the remaining residents. Throughout the course of the bombardment, 13 residents were killed, 51 were injured, and 4,258 buildings in the city were damaged.

== Background ==
The clashes are part of the Nagorno-Karabakh conflict over the disputed region of Nagorno-Karabakh with an ethnic Armenian majority. The region is a de jure part of Azerbaijan, but is de facto held by the self-proclaimed Republic of Artsakh, which is supported by Armenia. The region has been historically inhabited and governed by ethnic Armenians. During their brief independence from 1918 to 1920, Armenia and Azerbaijan fought for the Nagorno-Karabakh region. Following the Sovietization of Armenia and Azerbaijan, the Kavbiuro decided to keep Nagorno-Karabakh within the Azerbaijan SSR while granting it broad regional autonomy, citing the need for national peace between Muslims and Armenians, as well as the economic connection between Upper and Lower Karabakh and its permanent connection with Azerbaijan as justifications. Ethnic violence began in the late 1980s, and exploded into a full war following the dissolution of the USSR in 1991. The First Nagorno-Karabakh War resulted in approximately 724,000 Azerbaijanis being expelled from Armenia, Nagorno-Karabakh and the surrounding territories, and 300,000–500,000 Armenians being displaced from Azerbaijan or Armenian border areas. The War ended with a ceasefire in 1994, with the Republic of Artsakh controlling most of the Armenian-populated Nagorno-Karabakh region, as well as seven Azerbaijani-majority surrounding districts outside the enclave itself. Nagorno-Karabakh held an independence referendum in 1991, voting to secede from Azerbaijan. Azerbaijan did not recognize the independence of Nagorno-Karabakh and the war continued until the 1994 ceasefire.

For three decades, multiple violations of the ceasefire have occurred, the most serious incidents prior to the current conflict being the 2016 Nagorno-Karabakh clashes. Long-standing international mediation attempts to create a peace process were initiated by the OSCE Minsk Group in 1994, with the interrupted Madrid Principles being the most recent iteration. While how the present inhabitants of the area want to administer the territory is unclear, surveys indicate they do not want to be part of Azerbaijan. In August 2019, in an unprecedented declaration in favour of unification, the Armenian Prime Minister, Nikol Pashinyan, visited Nagorno-Karabakh, stating, “Artsakh is Armenia, full stop”.

Skirmishes occurred on the border between Armenia and Azerbaijan in July 2020. Thousands of Azerbaijanis demonstrated for war against Armenia in response, with Turkey propagandising in support of Azerbaijan.

On 23 July 2020, Armenia announced the start of a joint air defence system exercise with Russia and an analysis of the July 2020 clashes. A week later, Azerbaijan conducted a series of military exercises that lasted from 29 July to 10 August, and further exercises in early September with the involvement of Turkey. Turkey's support for Azerbaijan has been seen as connected to its expansionist, neo-Ottoman foreign policy, linking its intervention to its policies in Syria, Iraq, and the Eastern Mediterranean.

Prior to the resumption of hostilities, allegations emerged that hundreds of Syrian National Army members from the Hamza Division were transferred to Azerbaijan, which was soon followed by France24, The Independent and The Guardian reporting evidence of the Syrian fighters being recruited and transferred by Turkey. Meanwhile, Turkish media close to President Erdogan claimed that YPG and PKK members from Iraq and Syria were transferred to Nagorno-Karabakh in order to train Armenian militias against Azerbaijan. Subsequently, SOHR documented death of at least 541 Syrians fighting for Azerbaijan, while reports by European Parliament and the European Council condemned Turkey's involvement in the war and among other things its "transfer of fighters and mercenaries from jihadist groups located in northern Syria". The governments of both Azerbaijan and Armenia have denied allegations of involvement by foreign fighters.

== Bombardment ==
Shelling of Stepanakert on October 4, 2020.

International third parties confirmed witnessing evidence of the use of banned cluster munitions by Azerbaijan against civilian areas in Stepanakert and Nagorno-Karabakh. Reports indicated that Azerbaijan used missiles and cluster bombs starting on September 27, 2020. Over 180 cluster munitions were used between September 27, 2020 to October 10, 2020. Armenian experts have identified Soviet-made Smerch rockets, 9N235 submunition as one of the 72 bomblets dispersed. Israeli-made LAR-160 cluster munition rockets, M095 DPICM cluster munitions were also identified.

During an on-site investigation in Nagorno-Karabakh in October 2020, Human Rights Watch documented four incidents in which Azerbaijan used Israeli-made cluster munitions against civilian areas of Nagorno-Karabakh. The HRW investigation team did not find any sort of military sites in the residential neighborhoods where the cluster munitions were used and condemned its use against civilian populated areas. Stephen Goose, arms division director at Human Rights Watch and chair of the Cluster Munition Coalition, stated that "the continued use of cluster munitions – particularly in populated areas – shows flagrant disregard for the safety of civilians.” He then added that "the repeated use of cluster munitions by Azerbaijan should cease immediately as their continued use serves to heighten the danger for civilians for years to come." The HRW investigation team also noted that numerous civilian buildings and infrastructure, such as children's playgrounds, business, and homes, were heavily damaged due to shelling.

International media outlets reported about repeated indiscriminate shelling of civilian targets in Stepanakert. French AFP journalists said “there were regular explosions and clouds of black smoke rising in parts of the city”. German reporter from Bild wrote: “we spent every night in a basement. The sirens kept blaring. The attacks were fierce.” He described it as “the most intense of civilian shellings I have seen so far.” Russian RBK journalist wrote: ”For the fourth day in a row, the capital of Nagorno-Karabakh has been under continuous shelling. The shelling starts from the very morning. There are no military positions in the city center, strikes are directed at civilian targets.”

Several outlets reported increased cases of COVID-19 as a result of the shelling and drone strikes by Azerbaijan in Stepanakert, where the population is forced to live in overcrowded bunkers, and the difficulty that entails for testing and contact tracing

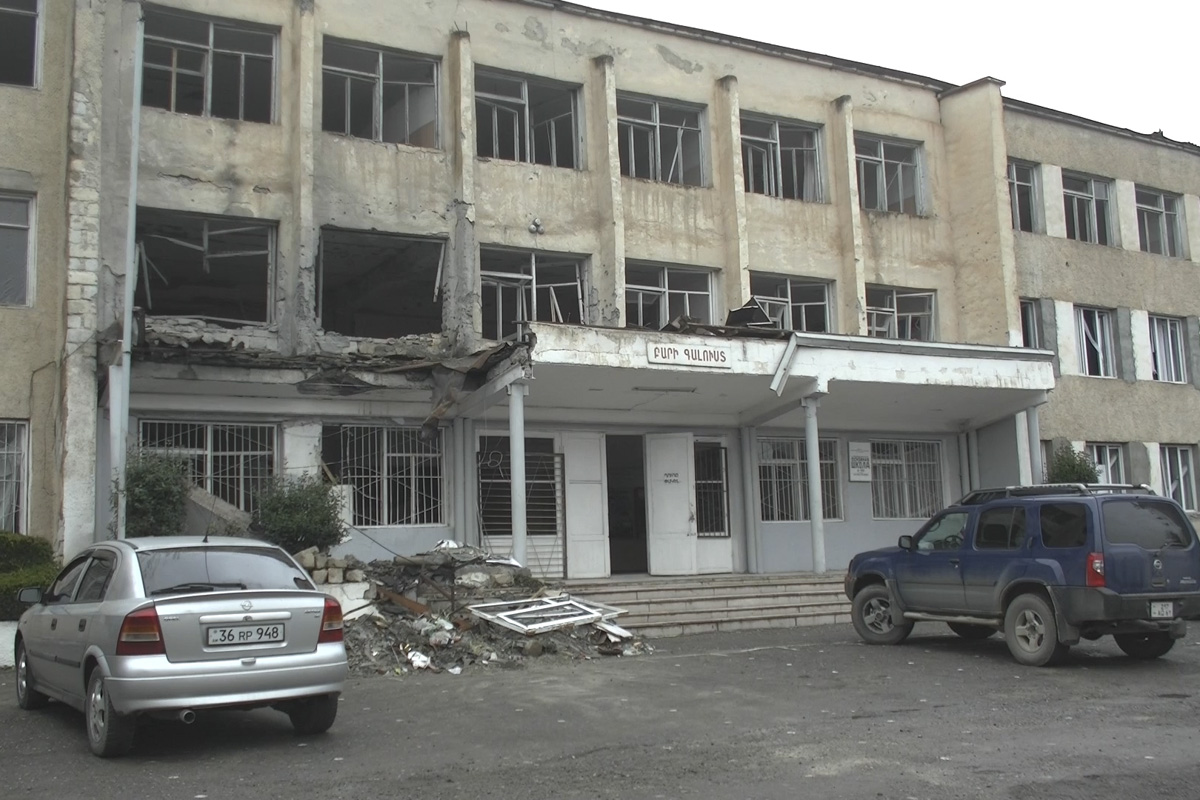
A partly destroyed middle school in Stepanakert

According to the Office of the President of the self-proclaimed Republic of Artsakh, hostilities commenced when at 08:03 on September 27 Azerbaijani armed forces launched artillery and aerial strikes against civilian settlements, including the capital, Stepanakert. Authorities urged the population to seek cover in bomb shelters. An air-raid siren was turned on in Stepanakert. More than a dozen people were injured in Stepanakert (including women and children); the Azerbaijani MoD denied these claims.

At approximately 14:00, the Armenian MoD stated that Azerbaijani forces were bombarding Stepanakert. As a result, the building of Ministry of Emergency Situations was partially destroyed and the cars in the parking lot were damaged. Residential buildings and also a military hospital was targeted. Reports indicated that 1 civilian was killed and 4 injured.

According to the Armenian government's Unified Info Center, Stepanakert, was shelled again on Saturday morning. "Caucasian Knot" correspondent has reported that at 11:00 a.m Azerbaijan resumed shelling of Stepanakert. Residents remained in shelters while air alert sirens were used to warn the population. Over the course of the day three explosions were heard.

External videos
- Stepanakert bombing, Armenian civilians take shelter on YouTube
- Nagorno-Karabakh hospital hit by shelling on YouTube

Armenian government's Unified Info Center reported that Azerbaijan had targeted the maternity hospital of Stepanakert on October 28. The Human Rights Watch report mentions that the new maternity ward had moved its operations to the basement because of the constant shelling in the city and according to staff testimonies and video material obtained by HRW "dozens of patients and staff were at the hospital during the attack, including pregnant women, women with bleeding and other gynaecological issues, civilians with light wounds, and soldiers in the emergency ward. The presence of injured soldiers in a hospital does not change its protected nature."

On October 31, Human Rights Ombudsman of the self-proclaimed Republic of Artsakh, Artak Beglaryan, released a video from the rubble of Stepanakert’s Central market, claiming that in violation of the humanitarian ceasefire agreement signed the day before Azerbaijan had shelled the market, calling on the international community to act in order to stop attacks on civilian population.

On December 11, 2020, Human Rights Watch released a comprehensive report about violations by Azerbaijan, also mentioning the attacks on Stepanakert using cluster munitions, Smerch, and Grad rockets, which occurred even though there was no evidence of military operations in those areas. The report also stated how in October, they spoke to 19 residents about the attacks, and the effects of the war in Stepanakert. HRW added a statement to the report saying "Such attacks are indiscriminate, violating the laws of war, because they do not distinguish between civilians and civilian objects and military targets."

On February 2, 2021, Special Rapporteurs of Office of the United Nations High Commissioner for Human Rights (OHCHR) sent a letter to Azerbaijan in condemnation “regarding reports of indiscriminate attacks on civilian areas, resulting in damage or destruction of schools, churches and other cultural heritage sites” and asking to “provide information on the steps taken to ensure respect for the principles of distinction, precaution and proportionality”. The letter states that Azerbaijani forces conducted multiple strikes “which may constitute a bombardment” on Stepanakert with indiscriminate weapons, including air-delivered weapons, large calibre artillery, rockets and cluster munitions in several parts of Stepanakert, including residential areas, resulting in damage to civilian infrastructures, including schools, residential homes, apartment complexes and the maternity ward of the Republic Medical Centre, which led to deaths and injuries to civilians. Dual use objects such as power plants, electricity and gas stations and the telecommunication head office located in residential areas were also targeted with indiscriminate weapons.

On 8 September 2021, Human Rights Watch released a new report which says that Azerbaijan used munitions "with wide-area effects", including "fundamentally-inaccurate artillery rockets", "targeting the nearby main electrical substation struck Stepanakert’s School No. 10 at least six times over the course of the conflict, putting dozens of classrooms out of commission and cutting the school’s electrical and water supply." Other schools damaged by shelling in Stepanakert during the 2020 war were School No. 12, Kindergarten No. 1, a music school, and the kindergarten of the Armenian Evangelical Association.

== See also ==
- 2020 bombardment of Martuni
- 2020 Ghazanchetsots Cathedral shelling
- Siege of Stepanakert
