= 2020 Ghazanchetsots Cathedral shelling =

Action in the Second Nagorno-Karabakh War

Ghazanchetsots Cathedral shelling Սուրբ Ղազանչեցոց եկեղեցու հրթիռակոծություն
- Part of the Second Nagorno-Karabakh War
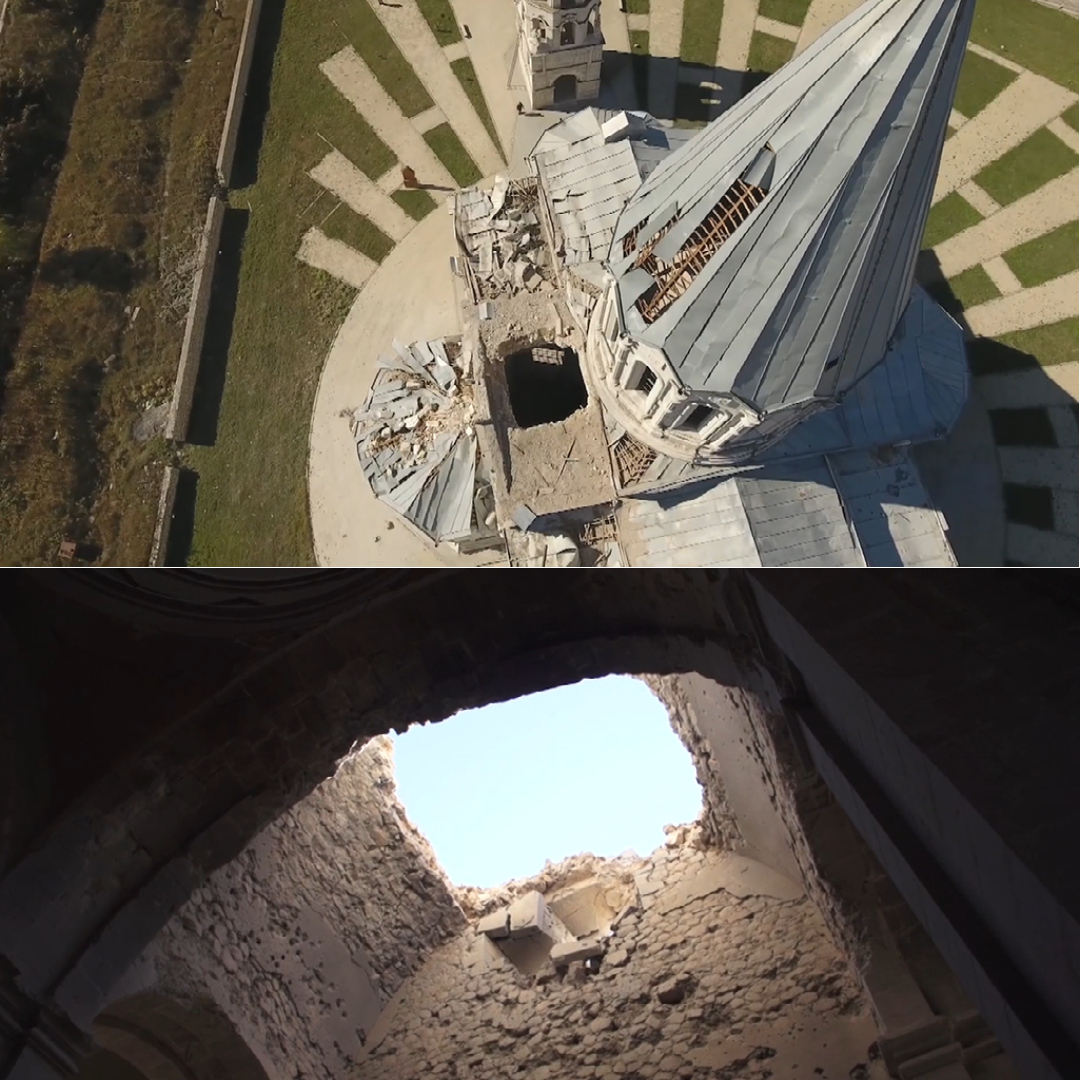
- Location: Shusha, Nagorno-Karabakh
- Date: 8 October 2020
- Injuries: 11
- Perpetrator: Azerbaijani Armed Forces

The 2020 shelling of Ghazanchetsots Cathedral took place prior to the Battle of Shusha on 8 October, when the Holy Savior Cathedral (Armenian: Սուրբ Ամենափրկիչ մայր տաճար, romanized: Surb Amenap′rkich mayr tachar) of the city of Shusha, known as Ghazanchetsots Cathedral (Armenian: Ղազանչեցոց, Azerbaijani: Qazançı), was struck twice by missiles, resulting in the collapse of a part of the roof. Armenia accused the Azerbaijani Armed Forces over the shelling.

== History ==
The shelling took place on the 11th day of the Second Nagorno-Karabakh War between Armenia and Azerbaijan, a continuation of the Nagorno-Karabakh conflict over the disputed Nagorno-Karabakh region dating from before the fall of communism. Shusha was held by the Republic of Artsakh, an ethnic Armenian polity since the First Nagorno-Karabakh War. In Azerbaijan, the loss of Shusha in 1992 was especially mourned as the city was the cultural centre of Azerbaijani poets, musicians, and composers. Prior to the war, the cathedral had been damaged in ethnic violence surrounding the 1920 Shusha massacre of Armenians and then used as storehouse in the Azerbaijan Soviet Socialist Republic and in the First Nagorno-Karabakh War, until Shusha fell to the Armed Forces of Armenia in 1992. The building was then restored in the 1990s by the Armenian Apostolic Church, which had built the church in the 1880s.

== Shelling ==
As reported by HRW: "On September 27, Azerbaijan launched a military offensive that escalated hostilities between Azerbaijan and Armenia and the de-facto authorities in Nagorno-Karabakh". It began air and ground attacks across a number of Nagorno-Karabakh cities and settlements, including the City on Shushi: "Several attacks on Shushi were reported in the first days of fighting. By early October, many of its residents had fled, though some civilians remained, including men, women, and children".

HRW and Amnesty International confirmed reports by the Armenian side on the use of cluster munitions in populated areas of Shushi and other settlements of Kharabakh, resulting in civilian casualties. Intense shelling of civilian areas of the city was also reported by international media outlets: "At daytime, when we had half an hour without an air-raid siren, for a change, we could see the damage. The missiles of the Azerbaijani army kept hitting apartment buildings and clearly civilian targets" reported the German Bild correspondent.

The Cultural House of Shushi was severely damaged by an Azerbaijani missile attack, according to media reports at the time of the attack, civilians were sheltered in the basement of the building.

=== Shelling of the cathedral ===
The first shell fell on the dome of the church at 12:30 on 8 October, severely damaging the interior. Local media reported that adults and children were sheltering inside the church when the first explosion occurred, but no-one was injured. At 17:00 same day, as journalists were inspecting the damage, a second shell struck the building. Two Russian journalists were wounded by the second strike; one, the editor-in-chief of Segodnya, was critically injured and underwent surgery in Stepanakert. An Armenian who accompanied the reporters was lightly injured.

External videos
- Cathedral In Nagorno-Karabakh Shelled - Radio Liberty on YouTube

In its subsequent report HRW specified that "Multiple factors indicate that both attacks were directed at the church. The remnants found indicate that the weapons used were capable of being directed at a specific target". Furthermore, both strikes hit the same part of the roof with a difference of less than two meters.

== Response ==
=== Armenia ===
Armenia's Foreign Ministry issued an official statement describing it as "another crime of the military-political leadership of Azerbaijan... this action fully fits into its policy of Armenophobia developed for decades. Azerbaijan, which has completely annihilated the Armenian cultural heritage in Nakhichevan and in other parts of the historical homeland of the Armenian people, now throughout the ongoing military aggression against Artsakh is trying to deprive Armenians of Artsakh of their homeland and historical memory". They also stated that "With these actions Azerbaijan replicates the behavior of its newly acquired allies, infamous international terrorist organizations that are responsible for the destruction of numerous historical-cultural monuments in the Middle East". Artsrun Hovhannisyan, spokesman of the defence ministry of Armenia, blamed the shelling on "enemy Azerbaijan".

According to Armenpress, Pargev Martirosyan, the bishop of the Diocese of Artsakh of which the cathedral is the episcopal see, compared the shelling with the actions of Islamic State of Iraq and the Levant, saying "They are bombarding our spiritual values, when we are restoring and preserving mosques". Another priest at the cathedral said "I feel the pain that the walls of our beautiful cathedral are destroyed. I feel the pain that today the world does not react to what's happening here and that our boys are dying defending our Motherland".

After the shelling, the Belgian- Armenian cellist Sevak Avanesyan playing the damaged building. He played the piece "Stork" (Armenian: Krunk) by the Armenian composer Komitas, who was a victim of the Armenian genocide. The video was posted on October 12 on Armenia's official Twitter account, which according to Al-Jazeera, was a message that the cathedral's shelling by Azerbaijan was part and parcel of a centuries-old enmity of Turks towards Armenians.

=== Azerbaijan ===
Azerbaijan's Defense Ministry officially denied involvement, while the Azerbaijan state news agency claimed Armenia was behind the attack.

In an interview with BBC News journalist Orla Guerin, the President of Azerbaijan, Ilham Aliyev, denied the church was a military target for his forces and said that the shelling was "either it was a mistake of our artillery or it was a deliberate provocation by Armenians themselves".

On Russia 1 TV show Evening with Vladimir Solovyov, Azerbaijani journalist and political analyst, Saadat Kadyrova, justified the shelling of the church since the Armenian armed forces were praying in the building.

=== International ===
condemned intentional attacks of civilians and civilian infrastructures by Azerbaijani forces, describing the strikes on the church as "part of policy of the cultural genocide that the Azerbaijani government has been implementing over the past 30 years by systematically destroying the Armenian historical heritage."

During the war, a group of genocide scholars — Israel Charny, Yair Auron, Matthias Bjørnlund, Tessa Hofmann and others — issued a statement on the ""imminent genocidal threat deriving from Azerbaijan and Turkey," adding that the destruction of Armenian cultural heritage was consistent with the "policy of the cultural genocide" that Azerbaijan had implemented over the past 30 years in Nakhichevan. In addition, the scholars stated that "a case can be made that there is conspiracy to commit genocide, direct and public incitement to commit genocide, and [an] attempt to commit genocide."

An article from Cultural Property News stated that "the vast scale and deliberate nature of the elimination of Armenian heritage by Azerbaijani officials makes clear that it is not an accident of war but a state-sponsored attempt to eliminate a people’s history."

World Monuments Fund condemned the targeting of the cathedral, stating that it "considers absolutely unacceptable any willful destruction of cultural heritage"

Human Rights Watch's Europe and Central Asia director Hugh Williamson called on Azerbaijan to investigate the attacks: "...the government needs to waste no time in investigating the attacks and holding those responsible to account. Attacks such as these serve no military purpose and all parties should ensure these kinds of attacks are punished and otherwise prevented."

== Aftermath ==
Azerbaijani forces seized control of Shusha on 7 November, after a three-day long battle over the city. On 10 November, a ceasefire agreement was reached between Armenia and Azerbaijan with Russia's mediation.

After Azerbaijan's seizure the remaining Armenian population fled the city, while multiple reports started emerging that Armenian cultural heritage was being vandalised and destroyed across the territories under Azerbaijani control. Among others, videos and photos of vandalized Ghazanchetsots Cathedral and partially destroyed Kanach Zham church were posted on social media. The Armenian Foreign Ministry and the Armenian Apostolic Church issued statements condemning these acts.

A number of scholars and cultural Institutions, like the Metropolitan Museum of Art, issued pleas for the preservation of cultural heritage in Nagorno-Karabakh, expressing concern and advocating for renewed protection of Armenian cultural heritage in the region.

On 20 November 2021, the UNESCO Director-General Audrey Azoulay declared the necessity of protecting the monuments of Nagorno-Karabakh and the inadmissibility of attempts to distort their identity. She offered to send an independent mission of experts to Nagorno-Karabakh and surrounding districts to draw a preliminary inventory of significant cultural properties. The proposal was approved by the member states, reflecting the Declaration of the UNESCO Committee for the Protection of Cultural Property in the Event of Armed Conflict. However Azerbaijan did not grant access to the territories, accusing UNESCO of being "bias" and using "double standards".

On 3 May 2021, Armenian sources began reporting that the dome and the cross of Ghazanchetsots Cathedral had been removed. After an outcry from the Armenia side, Azerbaijani authorities issued a statement saying the cathedral was under reconstruction to "restore" its "original" form, without specifying what they intended by the "original" style. The Armenian Foreign Ministry called these actions of Azerbaijan "deplorable" and an act of "vandalism aimed at depriving the Shushi Cathedral of its Armenian identity."

The USCIRF also expressed concern, stating that it was "troubled by reports concerning the preservation and integrity of houses of worship and other religious sites— such as the Armenian Apostolic Ghazanchetsots Cathedral in Shusha, which appears to have had its domes removed amid reports of its 'restoration' without the input of its congregation,". USCIRF Commissioner Nadine Maenza added that "While the cathedral is certainly in need of repair following the damage it endured as a result of Azerbaijani shelling last fall, it is imperative that it and other sites are properly restored and maintained." In its 2020 Annual Report USCIRF also recommended that the U.S. Department of State place Azerbaijan on its Special Watch List for its ongoing and systematic religious freedom violations. In its 2021 Annual Report USCIRF reiterated that "Over the course of the fighting and in the immediate aftermath of the November ceasefire, numerous local and international observers raised concerns about safeguarding religious and other cultural sites, specifically underscoring the need to protect the various Armenian churches, monasteries, and cemeteries lost or subsequently ceded to Azerbaijani control."

In a court hearing at the ECHR on October 15, 2020, the Armenian side presented, among other things, evidence of the shelling of the cathedral and Azerbaijan's subsequent treatment of it. On December 7, 2020, the court upheld the interim measures requested by Armenia to ensure that Azerbaijan prevented "vandalism and desecration" of the Armenian cultural heritage located in the territories controlled by Baku.

In March 2022 the European Parliament adopted a joint resolution condemning the destruction of Armenian Heritage in Nagorno- Kharabakh, including the destruction caused during and after the shelling of Ghazanchetsots Cathedral.

Currently the cathedral is completely covered by scaffolding and mesh. No independent international experts have been able to inspect the site as Azerbaijan continues to deny access to the UNESCO mission.

== Gallery ==
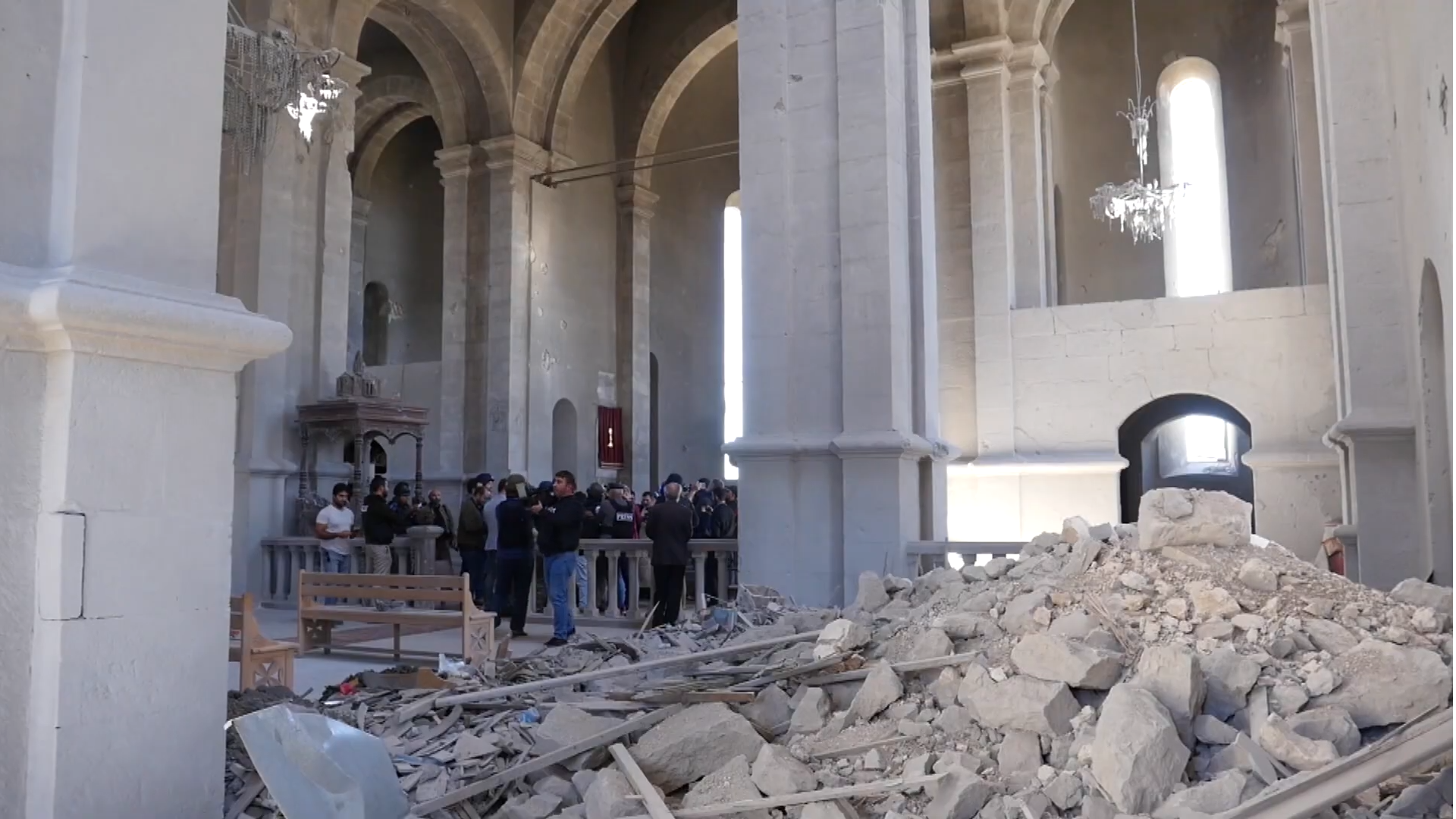
Armenian wedding in damaged Holy Savior Cathedral on 24 October 2020

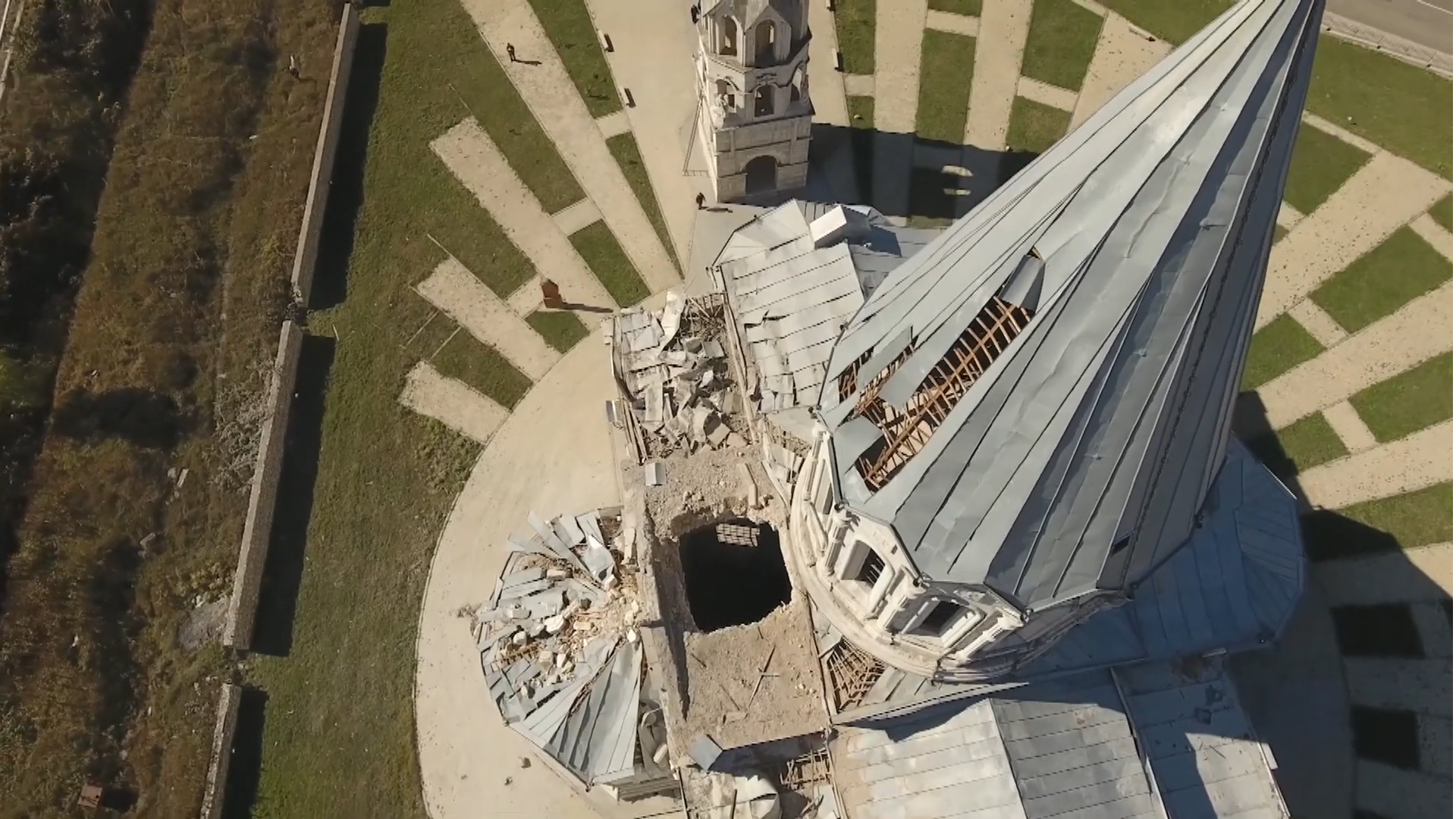
The roof of the damaged Ghazanchetsots Cathedral

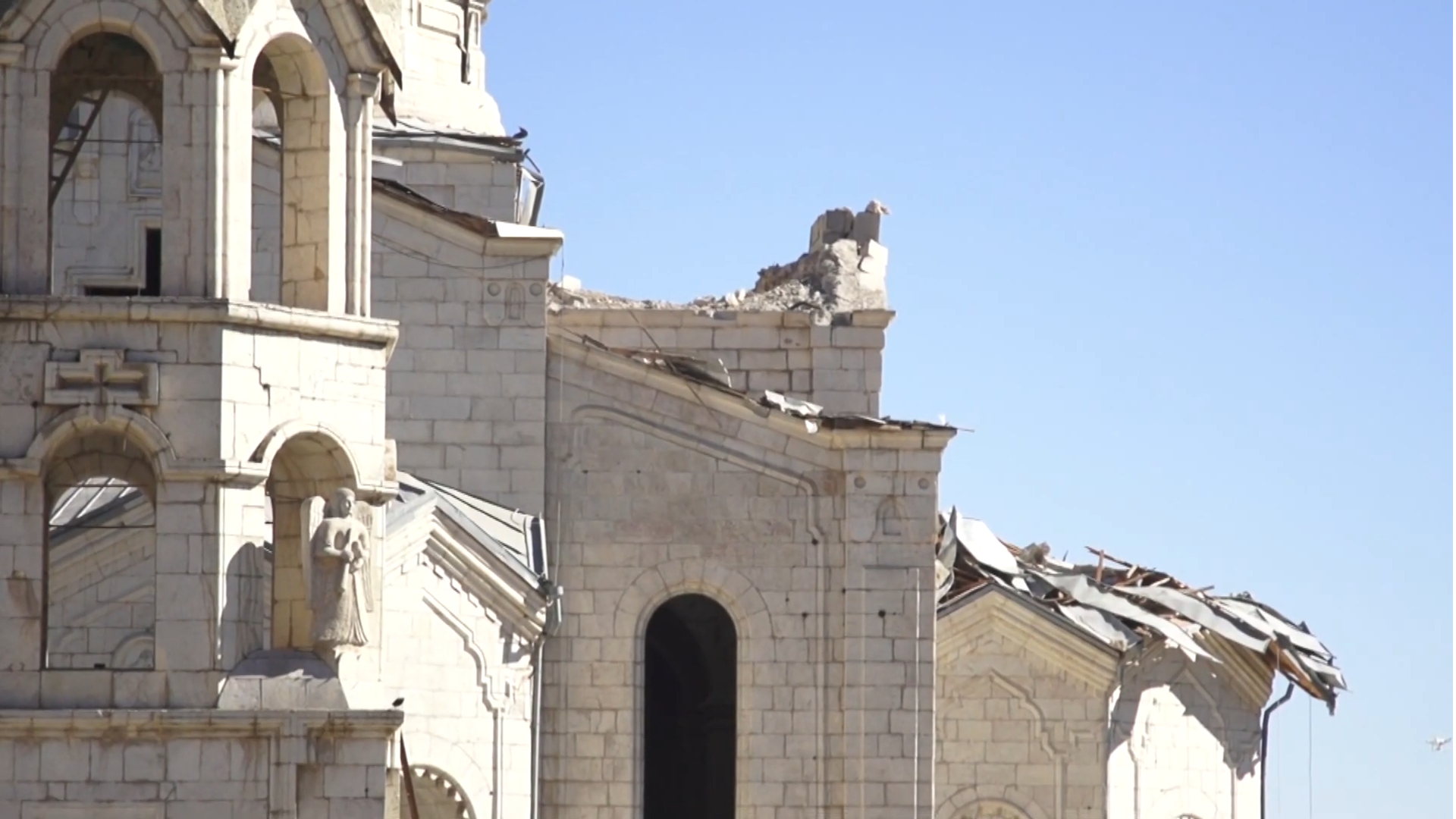
Damaged part of the Ghazanchetsots Cathedral

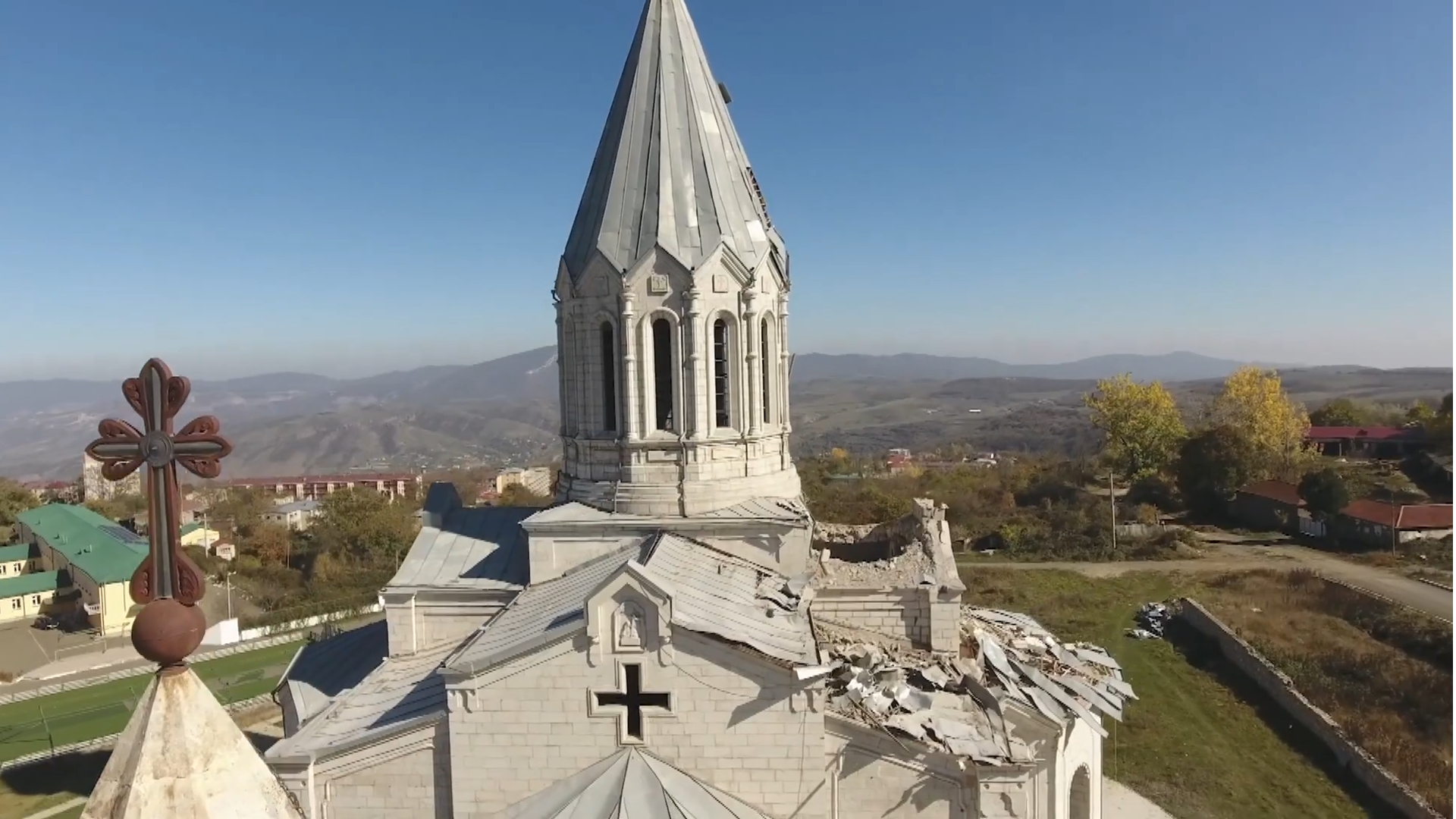
Damaged Ghazanchetsots

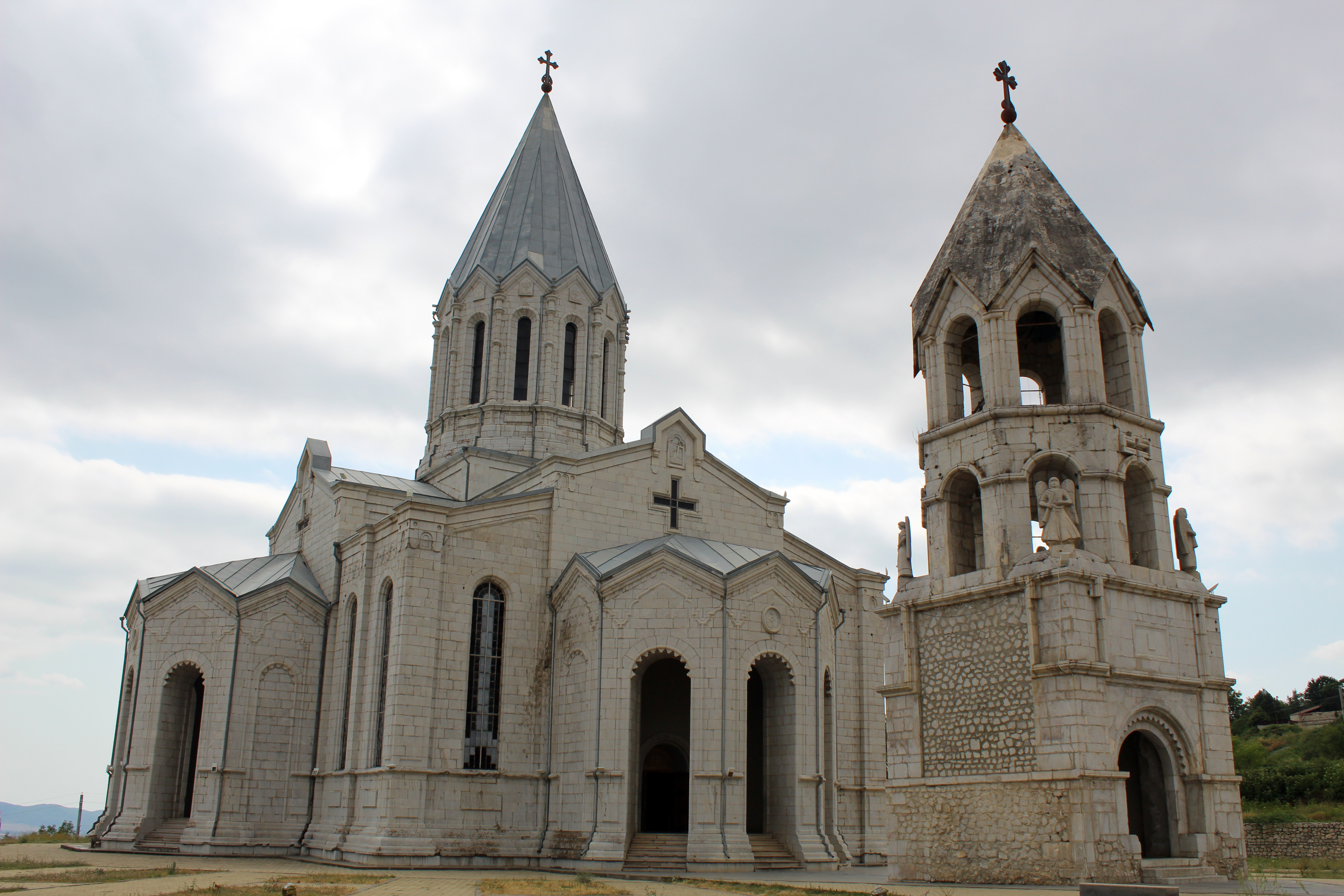
The Ghazanchetsots Cathedral before the shelling

== See also ==
- 2020 bombardment of Martuni
- 2020 Bombardment of Stepanakert
- Ghazanchetsots Cathedral
