= Bilici =

Bilici may refer to:

- Bilici Qorqan, village in the municipality of Qorqan in the Davachi Rayon of Azerbaijan
- Dağ Bilici, village and municipality in the Davachi Rayon of Azerbaijan
- Düz Bilici, village and municipality in the Davachi Rayon of Azerbaijan
- Bilići (disambiguation)
