= Vələsli =

Vələsli or Velasli may refer to:

- Vələsli, Davachi, Azerbaijan
- Vələsli, Ismailli, Azerbaijan
