= Armen Hovhannisyan =

Armenian soldier (1994–2014)

- Born: 30 June 1994; Yerevan, Armenia
- Died: 20 January 2014 (aged 19); Nagorno-Karabakh
- Burial place: Military Pantheon of Yerevan
- Military career
- Allegiance: Nagorno-Karabakh Republic; Armenia
- Branch: Nagorno-Karabakh Defense Army
- Rank: Junior Sergeant

Armen Levoni Hovhannisyan (Armenian: Արմեն Լևոնի Հովհաննիսյան; June 30, 1994 – January 20, 2014) was a junior sergeant in the Nagorno-Karabakh Republic Defense Army. He was posthumously awarded the Medal of Courage for noticing the intrusion of Azerbaijani subversive groups into the territory of the Nagorno-Karabakh Republic and organizing appropriate measures to move the enemy back to their starting positions.

== Biography ==
Armen Hovhannisyan was born on June 30, 1994. He was named after his uncle, who died at age 18. Armen was one of four children in the family, and was the only son. He graduated from Yerevan Basic School #141 named after Grigor Baghyan in Yerevan. Before being recruited, he studied at the State College of Culture and intended to continue his education as an operator. Armen was a sculptor and worked in a furniture workshop.

== Death ==
According to Armenian accounts, on January 19 and January 20, 2014, between 23:50 and 00:15, Azerbaijani subversive groups made simultaneous attempts at intrusion on the north-eastern (Jraberd) and south-eastern (Qorqan) portions of the NKR-Azerbaijani border line.

Azerbaijani saboteurs attacked in a large group of about 30 soldiers. However, Armen Hovhannisyan noticed them, warned his companions, and mounted a defense. Though badly wounded, he did not retreat but continued his defense. His actions allowed Armenian subunits of about nine soldiers to push the enemy back and inflict serious casualties. Vanguard subunits of NKR forces, identifying the activities of the Azerbaijani subversive group, mounted an organized defense, inflicted serious human and material damage, and pushed the enemy back to their original positions. Armen Hovhannisyan, wounded during the skirmish by an Azerbaijani bullet at a northeastern post, died during the military mission. He was posthumously awarded the Medal of Courage by order of NKR president Bako Sahakyan. He is the youngest soldier ever granted this medal. After his death, roughly thirty Azerbaijani web sites were attacked by the Armenian Cyber Army which placed a photo of the heroic Armenian soldier, accompanied by Armenian patriotic songs and the following message: “Armenian Cyber Army; in memoriam of Armen Hovhannisyan”.

The Azerbaijani Ministry of Defence denied any involvement in Hovhannisyan's death and claimed he died as a result of internal conflicts within the Armenian army. The Ministry also claimed that on the night of the 19th and 20 January, there were no incidents on the front lines, and specifically denied that the Azerbaijani armed forces had suffered any losses.

== Funeral ceremony ==
On January 22 Armen Hovhannisyan was buried in the Yerablur Military Pantheon following military practice. Funeral ceremonies were held in front of St. Vardanants Church. The Medal of Courage was presented to Armen's father, Levon Hovhannisyan. Minister of Defense Seyran Ohanyan, MD officials, freedom fighters, politicians, and representatives of intelligence agencies were present at the ceremony.

Candle-lighting and funeral ceremonies were organized in Yerevan, Gyumri, and the Nagorno-Karabakh Republic in his memory. A number of citizens honoured him by lighting candles in front of his house. Young people and passersby honoured his memory with a moment of silence on Northern Avenue. Later, a picture of Armen Hovhannisyan was brought into the square and candles were lit around it. A similar ceremony was also held in the Park of Cross-stones in Gyumri. At the same time as Armen Hovhannisyan was being buried in Yerablur Military Pantheon, a funeral ceremony was held in St. Jacob Church of Stepanakert with NKR president Bako Sahakyan, high-ranking officials, soldiers, and ordinary citizens in attendance.

== See also ==
- Azerbaijani diversion threatens peaceful conflict resolution: Vice Parliament Speaker
