= Gendob =

Gendob may refer to:

- Cəndov, a village in the Ismailli Rayon of Azerbaijan
- Gəndov, several places in Azerbaijan
