= Gəndov =

Gəndov, Gyandov or Qandov may refer to:

- Gəndov, Davachi, Azerbaijan
- Gəndov, Ismailli, Azerbaijan
- Gəndov, Lerik, Azerbaijan
