= Xəlfələr =

Xəlfələr or Khalfalar or Khal’fyalyar may refer to:

- Xəlfələr, Davachi, Azerbaijan
- Xəlfələr, Masally, Azerbaijan
