= Qorqan =

Qorqan or Qorğan may refer to:

- Kazakh name of Kurgan, Russia
- Qorqan, Shabran, Azerbaijan
- Qorqan, Fuzuli, Azerbaijan
- Qorqan, Iran
