= Guleh =

Guleh (Persian: گوله) may refer to:

- Güləh, Azerbaijan
- Guleh, Mahabad, West Azerbaijan Province, Iran
- Guleh, Sardasht, West Azerbaijan Province, Iran
