= Kyünçal =

- Location within Azerbaijan
- Coordinates: 41°05′N 48°49′E
- Country: Azerbaijan
- Rayon: Davachi
- Municipality: Çaraq
- Time zone: UTC+4 (AZT)
  - Summer (DST): UTC+5 (AZT)

Kyünçal (also, Kyunchal) is a village in the Davachi Rayon of Azerbaijan. The village forms part of the municipality of Çaraq.
