= Shykhly =

- Location within Azerbaijan
- Coordinates: 41°07′N 48°57′E
- Country: Azerbaijan
- Rayon: Davachi
- Time zone: UTC+4 (AZT)
  - Summer (DST): UTC+5 (AZT)

Shykhly is a village in the Shabran District of Azerbaijan.
