= Hacıqaraqaşlı =

- Municipality
- Location within Azerbaijan
- Coordinates: 41°20′39″N 49°03′35″E
- Cry: Azerbaijan
- Rayon: Şabran

Population
  - Total: 315
- Time zone: UTC+4 (AZT)
  - Summer (DST): UTC+5 (AZT)

Hacıqaraqaşlı (literally [those] with black eyebrow) is a village and municipality in the Şabran Rayon of Azerbaijan.

== Toponym ==
It was formed at the end of the 18th century as a result of the settlement of families belonging to the Qaraqaşlı tribe, who were resettled from Qarabağ by the Khan of Quba, Fatali Khan (1757-89). Haji was the name of the head of these families.
