= Hacıisgəndərli =

- Location within Azerbaijan
- Coordinates: 41°04′38″N 48°54′03″E
- Country: Azerbaijan
- Rayon: Davachi
- Municipality: Çaraq
- Time zone: UTC+4 (AZT)
  - Summer (DST): UTC+5 (AZT)

Hacıisgəndərli (also, Dzhugutar”, Gadzhiiskenderli, Gadzhilzkendere, and Gadzhyiskenderli) is a village in the Davachi Rayon of Azerbaijan. The village forms part of the municipality of Çaraq.
