= Ağalıq =

- Location within Azerbaijan
- Coordinates: 41°19′46″N 48°52′51″E
- Country: Azerbaijan
- Rayon: Davachi

Population
  - Total: 2,446
- Time zone: UTC+4 (AZT)
  - Summer (DST): UTC+5 (AZT)

Ağalıq (known as Beynəlmiləl until 1999) is a village and the most populous municipality, except for the capital Dəvəçi, in the Davachi Rayon of Azerbaijan. It has a population of 2,446.
