= Uqah =

- Location within Azerbaijan
- Coordinates: 41°06′N 48°52′E
- Country: Azerbaijan
- Rayon: Davachi
- Municipality: Çaraq
- Time zone: UTC+4 (AZT)
  - Summer (DST): UTC+5 (AZT)

Uqah (also, Ugah, Uchakh, Uga, and Ugakh) is a village in the Shabran Rayon of Azerbaijan. The village forms part of the municipality of Çaraq.
