= Təkyə =

- Location within Azerbaijan
- Coordinates: 41°04′55″N 48°52′52″E
- Country: Azerbaijan
- Rayon: Davachi
- Municipality: Çaraq
- Time zone: UTC+4 (AZT)
  - Summer (DST): UTC+5 (AZT)

Təkyə (also, Tekyə and Taka) is a village in the Davachi Rayon of Azerbaijan. The village forms part of the municipality of Çaraq.
