= Abasbəyli =

Coordinates: 39°01′N 48°36′E

Abasbəyli is a village and municipality in the Masally Rayon of Azerbaijan. It has a population of 658.

== Toponymy ==
In 1933, Abasbeyli villages were also registered in the territories of Devechi and Sabirabad districts. These oikonyms are related to the ethnonym Abasbeyli.
