= Zağlı =

- Location within Azerbaijan
- Coordinates: 41°09′N 48°50′E
- Country: Azerbaijan
- Rayon: Davachi
- Municipality: Düz Bilici
- Time zone: UTC+4 (AZT)
  - Summer (DST): UTC+5 (AZT)

Zağlı (also, Zagli and Zagly) is a village in the Davachi Rayon of Azerbaijan. The village forms part of the municipality of Düz Bilici.
