= Çinarlar =

- Location within Azerbaijan
- Coordinates: 41°08′N 48°47′E
- Country: Azerbaijan
- Rayon: Davachi
- Municipality: Düz Bilici
- Time zone: UTC+4 (AZT)
  - Summer (DST): UTC+5 (AZT)

Çinarlar (also Chinarlar) is a village in the Davachi Rayon of Azerbaijan. The village forms part of the municipality of Düz Bilici.
