= Çaraq =

- Municipality
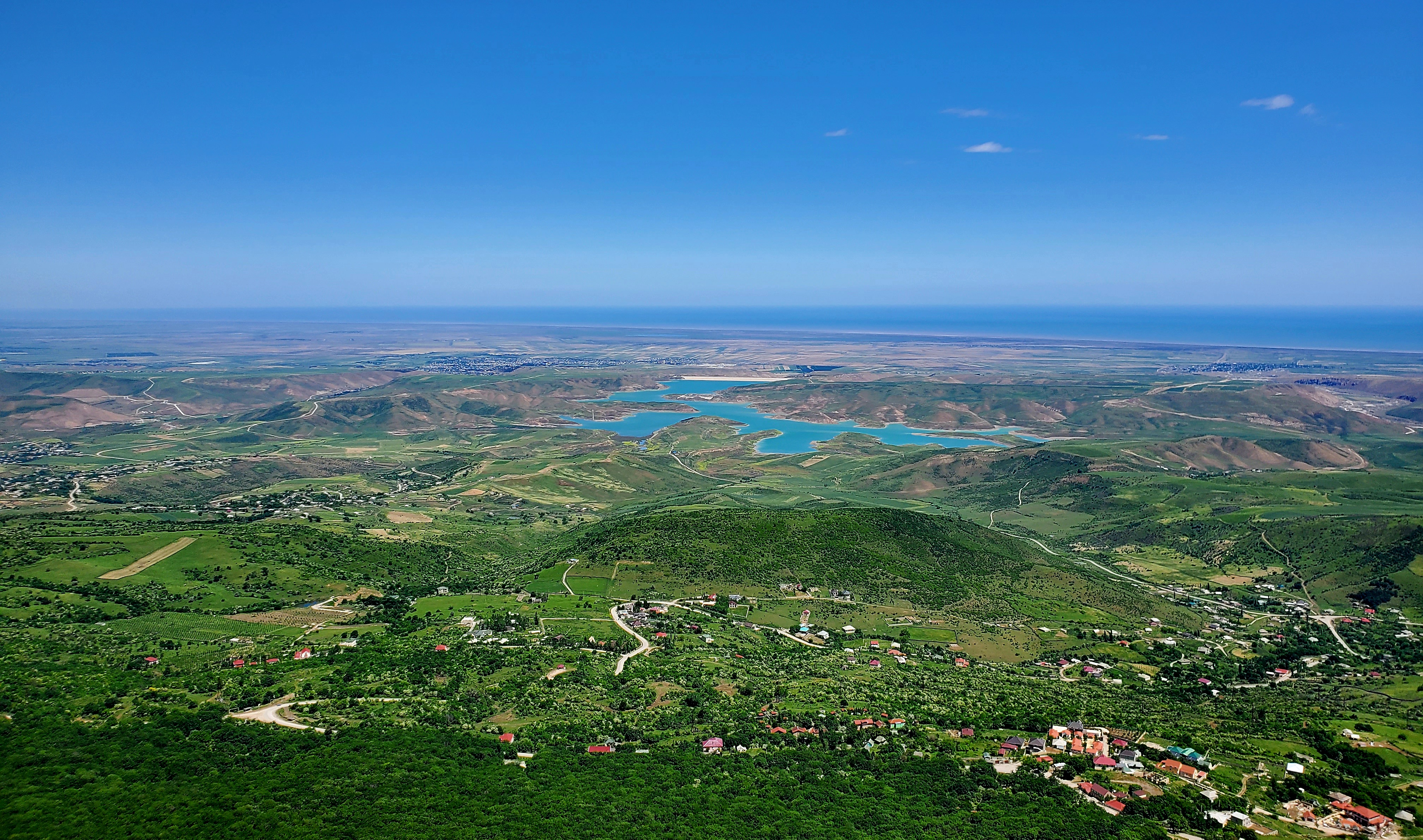
- Çıraqqala

- Location within Azerbaijan
- Coordinates: 41°06′47″N 48°58′54″E
- Country: Azerbaijan
- Rayon: Davachi

Population
  - Total: 219
- Time zone: UTC+4 (AZT)
  - Summer (DST): UTC+5 (AZT)

Çaraq (also, Çarah and Karakh) is a village and municipality in the Davachi Rayon of Azerbaijan. It has a population of 219. The municipality consists of the villages of Çarah, Kyünçal, Təkyə, Hacıisgəndərli, Güləh, and Uqah.
