= Şahnəzərli =

- Municipality
- Location within Azerbaijan
- Coordinates: 41°17′24″N 48°52′33″E
- Country: Azerbaijan
- Rayon: Davachi

Population
  - Total: 1,092
- Time zone: UTC+4 (AZT)
  - Summer (DST): UTC+5 (AZT)

Şahnəzərli (also, Beyuk- Shakhnazarli, Bëyuk Shakhnazarli, and Shakh-Nazarly) is a village and municipality in the Davachi Rayon of Azerbaijan. It has a population of 1,092.
