= Vardan Stepanyan =

Armenian military commander

- Born: March 9, 1966; Yerevan, Armenian SSR, Soviet Union
- Died: July 3, 1992 (aged 26); Myurishen, Nagorno-Karabakh
- Burial place: Yerablur
- Military career
- Allegiance: Armenian Revolutionary Federation
- Service years: 1984–1986 (Afghanistan); 1989–1992 (Karabakh)
- Nickname: Dushman
- Conflicts: Soviet–Afghan War; First Nagorno-Karabakh War
- Awards: Medal "For Courage"; Jubilee Medal "70 Years of the Armed Forces of the USSR"; Order of Combat Cross

Vardan Stepanyan (Armenian: Վարդան Ստեփանյան; March 9, 1966 – July 3, 1992), better known as Dushman Vardan, (Note: Armenian: Դուշման Վարդան, "dushman" is Persian for "enemy".) was an Armenian military commander during the First Nagorno-Karabakh War. He is considered a hero in Armenia.

== Early life and service in Afghanistan ==
Vardan Stepanyan was born on March 9, 1966, in Yerevan, Soviet Armenia. After finishing the Tumanyan School #32 of Yerevan in 1983, he was drafted to the Soviet army. He served in Afghanistan from 1984 to 1986. For his service there, Stepanyan was awarded with Medal "For Courage" and Jubilee Medal "70 Years of the Armed Forces of the USSR". After being discharged from the Red Army, Stepanyan was admitted into the Yerevan State University Department of Law.

== Karabakh war ==
Stepanyan joined the Karabakh movement in early 1988. He initially led the group of Armenian veterans of the Afghanistan War in transferring weapons and equipment to Karabakh Armenians. Since 1989, Stepanyan participated in self-defense in Ijevan, Noyemberyan, Shamshadin. Ararat, Vardenis and Goris. In 1991 amid the escalation of the First Nagorno-Karabakh War, Stepanyan moved to Karabakh and took active role in the battles in Khojaly, Lesnoy, Krzhkan, Malybeyli, Lachin, Martakert, Askeran, Berdadzor, etc. In December 1991, the last Soviet forces withdrew from the region leaving Armenian irregulars against Azerbaijanis one on one. The Azerbaijan forces soon encircled Stepanakert, the largest city of Karabakh. He successfully led the Armenian volunteers in a battle against Azerbaijanis in Stepanakert's Krkjan district.

On May 8–9, 1992, the Armenian forces captured Shusha, thus breaking the siege of Stepanakert and forcing the Azeris to retreat. Stepanyan actively participated in the "Liberation of Shushi" as Armenians say it. Azerbaijan launched Operation Goranboy in mid-June, pushing Armenian forces back from northern Karabakh. Vardan Stepanyan was killed by a mine explosion on July 3, 1992, in Myurishen village of the Martuni Province.

== Legacy and memory ==
Stepanyan was buried at Yerablur military cemetery in Armenia's capital Yerevan. He was posthumously awarded with First Degree Order of the Combat Cross of the Nagorno-Karabakh Republic in 1993 and Second Degree Order of the Combat Cross of Armenia in 1996.

One of the auditoriums of the Department of Law of the Yerevan State University was named after him in 1994. A street in Shushi was named "Dushman Vardan Stepanyan", while his museum operates in Yerevan. A statue of him was erected near Myurishen village.
