= Mollakamallı =

- Municipality
- Location within Azerbaijan
- Coordinates: 41°14′45″N 48°56′21″E
- Country: Azerbaijan
- Rayon: Davachi

Population
  - Total: 275
- Time zone: UTC+4 (AZT)
  - Summer (DST): UTC+5 (AZT)

Mollakamallı (also, Kuybışevkənd, Mollakemally, and Molla-Kemanly) is a village and municipality in the Davachi Rayon of Azerbaijan. It has a population of 275.
