= Yalavanc =

- Municipality
- Location within Azerbaijan
- Coordinates: 41°13′42″N 49°05′25″E
- Country: Azerbaijan
- Rayon: Shabran

Population
  - Total: 245
- Time zone: UTC+4 (AZT)
  - Summer (DST): UTC+5 (AZT)

Yalavanc (also, Yalavandzh) is a village and municipality in the Shabran Rayon of Azerbaijan. It has a population of 245.
