= Uzunboyad =

- Municipality
- Location within Azerbaijan
- Coordinates: 41°17′18″N 48°55′09″E
- Country: Azerbaijan
- Rayon: Davachi

Population
  - Total: 1,378
- Time zone: UTC+4 (AZT)
  - Summer (DST): UTC+5 (AZT)

Uzunboyad (also, Uzunboyat) is a village and municipality in the Davachi Rayon of Azerbaijan. It has a population of 1,378.
