= Mustafaxanlı =

- Location within Azerbaijan
- Coordinates: 40°58′N 48°54′E
- Country: Azerbaijan
- Rayon: Davachi
- Time zone: UTC+4 (AZT)
  - Summer (DST): UTC+5 (AZT)

Mustafaxanlı (also, Mustafakhanly) is a village in the Davachi Rayon of Azerbaijan.
