= Khaltandekhnya =

- Location within Azerbaijan
- Coordinates: 41°01′48″N 48°47′16″E
- Country: Azerbaijan
- Rayon: Davachi
- Time zone: UTC+4 (AZT)
  - Summer (DST): UTC+5 (AZT)

Khaltandekhnya (also, Khaltan”dagnya) is a village in the Davachi Rayon of Azerbaijan.
