= Mamedoba =

- Location within Azerbaijan
- Coordinates: 41°22′N 49°02′E
- Country: Azerbaijan
- Rayon: Davachi
- Time zone: UTC+4 (AZT)
  - Summer (DST): UTC+5 (AZT)

Mamedoba is a village in the Davachi Rayon of Azerbaijan.
