= Kuyubulak =

- Location within Azerbaijan
- Coordinates: 41°08′N 49°01′E
- Country: Azerbaijan
- Rayon: Davachi
- Time zone: UTC+4 (AZT)
  - Summer (DST): UTC+5 (AZT)

Kuyubulak (also, Koybulagi and Kuyubulag) is a village in the Davachi Rayon of Azerbaijan.
