= Sincanboyat =

- Municipality
- Location within Azerbaijan
- Coordinates: 41°13′20″N 48°57′38″E
- Country: Azerbaijan
- Rayon: Davachi

Population
  - Total: 589
- Time zone: UTC+4 (AZT)
  - Summer (DST): UTC+5 (AZT)

Sincanboyat (also, Sincanboyad, Bayat-Sindzhap and Sindzhanboyat) is a village and municipality in the Davachi Rayon of Azerbaijan. It has a population of 589.
