= Leyti =

- Municipality
- Location within Azerbaijan
- Coordinates: 41°14′07″N 48°50′42″E
- Country: Azerbaijan
- Rayon: Davachi

Population
  - Total: 140
- Time zone: UTC+4 (AZT)
  - Summer (DST): UTC+5 (AZT)

Leyti (also, Ashagy-Gendob, Löyti, and Leyty) is a village and the least populous municipality in the Davachi Rayon of Azerbaijan. It has a population of 140.
