= Yeləkəsən =

- Location within Azerbaijan
- Coordinates: 41°10′07″N 48°53′21″E
- Country: Azerbaijan
- Rayon: Şabran
- Municipality: Xəlfələr
- Time zone: UTC+4 (AZT)
  - Summer (DST): UTC+5 (AZT)

Yeləkəsən (also, Yelekesan) is a village in the Shabran District of Azerbaijan. The village forms part of the municipality of Xəlfələr.
