= Qozbabalı =

- Municipality
- Location within Azerbaijan
- Coordinates: 41°07′13″N 48°56′10″E
- Country: Azerbaijan
- Rayon: Davachi

Population
  - Total: 351
- Time zone: UTC+4 (AZT)
  - Summer (DST): UTC+5 (AZT)

Qozbabalı (also, Qazbabalı, Kazbabali, and Kazbabaly) is a village and municipality in the Davachi Rayon of Azerbaijan. It has a population of 351.
