= Baş Əmirxanlı =

- Location within Azerbaijan
- Coordinates: 41°07′50″N 48°55′38″E
- Country: Azerbaijan
- Rayon: Davachi
- Time zone: UTC+4 (AZT)
  - Summer (DST): UTC+5 (AZT)

Baş Əmirxanlı (also, Bash Emirkhanly and Bash Amirkhanli) is a village in the Davachi Rayon of Azerbaijan. The village contains a dwelling dating from the Middle Ages which is registered with the Ministry of Culture and Tourism.
