= Karaulkhana =

- Location within Azerbaijan
- Coordinates: 40°56′N 48°56′E
- Country: Azerbaijan
- Rayon: Davachi
- Time zone: UTC+4 (AZT)
  - Summer (DST): UTC+5 (AZT)

Karaulkhana is a village in the Davachi Rayon of Azerbaijan. The time zone in Karaulkhana is Asia/Baku.
