= Aygünlü =

- Municipality
- Location within Azerbaijan
- Coordinates: 41°17′58″N 48°51′26″E
- Country: Azerbaijan
- Rayon: Shabran

Area
  - Total: 7.04 km^{2} (2.72 sq mi)

Population
  - Total: 1,055
- Time zone: UTC+4 (AZT)
  - Summer (DST): UTC+5 (AZT)
- Area code: AZ1721

Aygünlü (also, Aygyunli, Gonchi, and Mollakamalli) is a village and municipality in the Shabran Rayon of Azerbaijan. It has a population of 1,055.
