= Mumlu =

Human settlement in Azerbaijan

Coordinates: 41°13′N 48°50′E

Mumlu is a village in the municipality of Dağ Bilici in the Davachi Rayon of Azerbaijan.
