= Baladzha Shakhnazarli =

- Location within Azerbaijan
- Coordinates: 41°16′51″N 48°54′13″E
- Country: Azerbaijan
- Rayon: Davachi
- Time zone: UTC+4 (AZT)
  - Summer (DST): UTC+5 (AZT)

Baladzha Shakhnazarli is a village in the Davachi Rayon of Azerbaijan.
