= Izmara =

- Location within Azerbaijan
- Coordinates: 41°10′N 48°51′E
- Country: Azerbaijan
- Rayon: Davachi
- Municipality: Qorqan
- Time zone: UTC+4 (AZT)
  - Summer (DST): UTC+5 (AZT)

Izmara (also, İzmara) is a village in the Davachi Rayon of Azerbaijan. The village forms part of the municipality of Qorqan.
