= Ceyranlı =

- Location within Azerbaijan
- Coordinates: 41°08′36″N 48°55′38″E
- Country: Azerbaijan
- Rayon: Davachi
- Municipality: Vələsli
- Time zone: UTC+4 (AZT)
  - Summer (DST): UTC+5 (AZT)

Ceyranlı (also, Dzheyranly and Orta Emirkhanly) is a village in the Davachi Rayon of Azerbaijan. The village forms part of the municipality of Vələsli.
