= Gyulamli =

- Location within Azerbaijan
- Coordinates: 41°12′22″N 49°01′13″E
- Country: Azerbaijan
- Rayon: Davachi
- Time zone: UTC+4 (AZT)
  - Summer (DST): UTC+5 (AZT)

Gyulamli (also, Gyulamly and Gyulemli) is a village in the Davachi Rayon of Azerbaijan.
