= Belisli =

- Location within Azerbaijan
- Coordinates: 41°08′23″N 48°55′56″E
- Country: Azerbaijan
- Rayon: Davachi
- Time zone: UTC+4 (AZT)
  - Summer (DST): UTC+5 (AZT)

Belisli is a village in the Davachi Rayon of Azerbaijan.
