= Taxtalar =

Village and municipality in Davachi Rayon, Azerbaijan

Coordinates: 41°11′48″N 48°56′21″E

Taxtalar is a village and municipality in the Davachi Rayon of Azerbaijan. It has a population of 532.
