= Çölquşçu =

- Municipality
- Location within Azerbaijan
- Coordinates: 41°20′12″N 49°00′39″E
- Country: Azerbaijan
- Rayon: Davachi

Population
  - Total: 720
- Time zone: UTC+4 (AZT)
  - Summer (DST): UTC+5 (AZT)

Çölquşçu (also, Çöl Quşçu, Chël’ Kushchu, Cholkushchi, Cholkushchu, and Nizhniye Kushchi) is a village and municipality in the Davachi Rayon of Azerbaijan. It has a population of 720.
