= Beynelmilel =

Beynelmilel may refer to:

- Beynəlmiləl, Azerbaijan
- Beynelmilel (film), Turkish film, see Cinema of Turkey
