= Vələsli, Davachi =

Human settlement in Azerbaijan

Vələsli is a village and municipality in the Davachi Rayon of Azerbaijan. It has a population of 329. The municipality consists of the villages of Vələsli and Ceyranlı.
