= Xəlfələr, Davachi =

Xəlfələr
- Municipality
- Location within Azerbaijan
- Coordinates: 41°10′30″N 48°53′13″E
- Country: Azerbaijan
- Rayon: Davachi District

Population
  - Total: 400
- Time zone: UTC+4 (AZT)
  - Summer (DST): UTC+5 (AZT)

Xəlfələr (also, Khalfalar) is a village and municipality in the Shabran District of Azerbaijan. It has a population of 400. The municipality consists of the villages of Xəlfələr and Yeləkəsən.
