= Bilici Qorqan =

Human settlement in Azerbaijan

Bilici Qorqan Bilici-Qorğan
- Village
- Interactive map of Bilici Qorqan
- Coordinates: 41°10′N 48°49′E
- Country: Azerbaijan
- Rayon: Davachi Rayon
- Municipality: Qorqan
- Time zone: UTC+4 (AZT)
  - Summer (DST): UTC+5 (AZT)

Bilici Qorqan (also, Bilici-Qorğan) is a village in the municipality of Qorqan in the Davachi Rayon of Azerbaijan.
