= Bilići =

Bilići may refer to:

- Bilići, Croatia, a hamlet of Kostanje
- Bilići, Serbia, a village near Sombor
- Bilići, Travnik, a village in Bosnia

== See also ==
- Bilić (disambiguation)
