= Dağ Bilici =

- Municipality
- Location within Azerbaijan
- Coordinates: 41°12′42″N 48°50′39″E
- Country: Azerbaijan
- Rayon: Davachi

Population
  - Total: 696
- Time zone: UTC+4 (AZT)
  - Summer (DST): UTC+5 (AZT)

Dağ Bilici (also, Dağbilici and Dag-Bilidzhi) is a village and municipality in the Davachi Rayon of Azerbaijan. It has a population of 696. The municipality consists of the villages of Dağ Bilici and Mumlu.
