= Holy Vartanants Martyrs Church =

- Սրբոց Վարդանանց Նահատակաց եկեղեցի
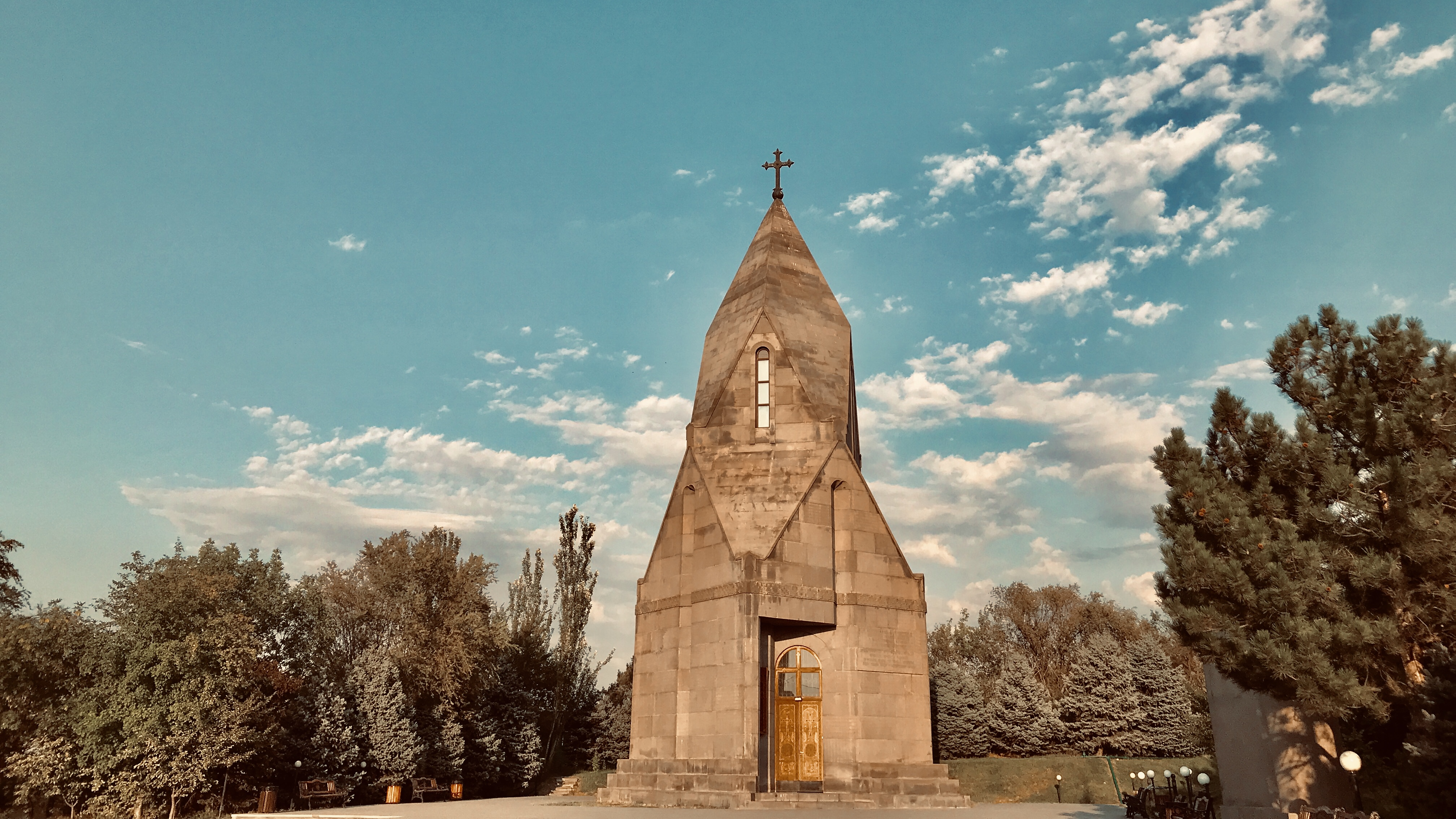

- Location within Armenia

Religion
- Affiliation: Armenian Apostolic Church

Location
- Location: Yerablur Military Pantheon, Yerevan, Armenia
- Interactive map of Holy Vartanants Martyrs Church
- Coordinates: 40.158333°N 44.458333°E

Architecture
- Architect: Aslan Mkhitaryan
- Type: Church
- Style: Armenian
- Completed: 1998

St. Vartanants Martyrs Church (Armenian: Սրբոց Վարդանանց Նահատակաց եկեղեցի, romanized: Srbots Vardanants Nahatakats yekeghetsi) is the Armenian Apostolic Church in the Malatia-Sebastia District of Yerevan, the capital of Armenia. It is located on the Yerablur hill, right of the Yerevan-Echmiadzin highway.

On the day of Saint Vartanants, the Armenian Apostolic Church holds a liturgy in the church.

The church is located next to the Yerablur Military Pantheon. Various Armenian officials visit the church to honor the memory of the fallen Armenian soldiers.

== History ==
The construction of St. Vardanants Martyrs Church in Yerablur began in 1994 on the initiative of Catholicos of All Armenians Karekin I and Vazgen Sargsyan. The sponsors of the construction of the church are the Armenian Americans Hrach and Victoria Voskanyan. The church was consecrated in 1998 by Archbishop Garegin Nersisyan.

Gradually, a community formed around the church, consisting of the parents of the killed Armenian and Artsakh soldiers, whose graves are buried in the Yerablur Military Pantheon. By order of the Catholicos of All Armenians in the church every Sunday on the Feast of Tabernacles, on the Days of the Dead, on the feasts of St. Vardanants and St. Sarkis, the sacred liturgy is celebrated.

== Gallery ==
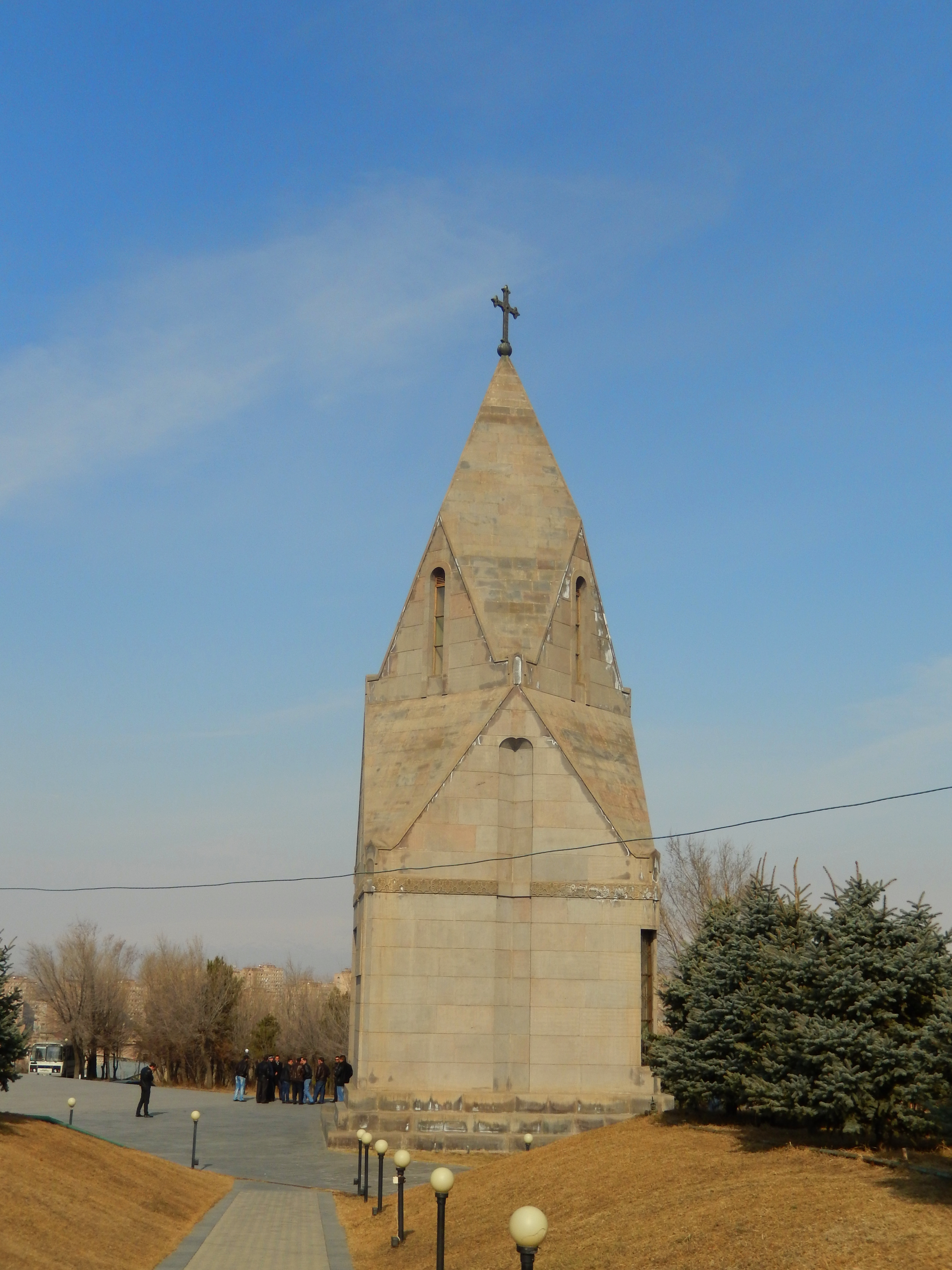
St. Holy Vartanants Martyrs Church

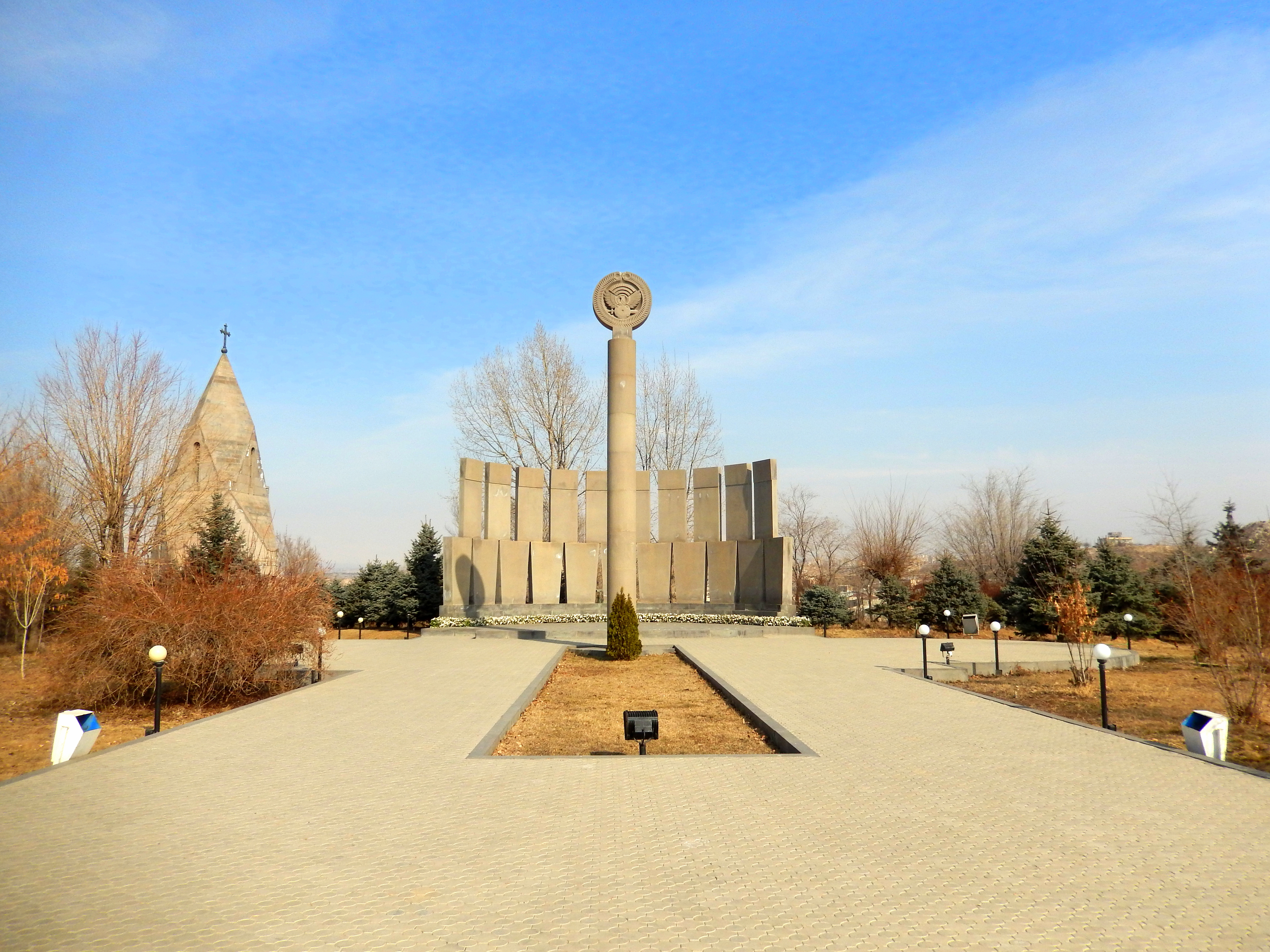
Church on the background of the Yerablur Military Pantheon

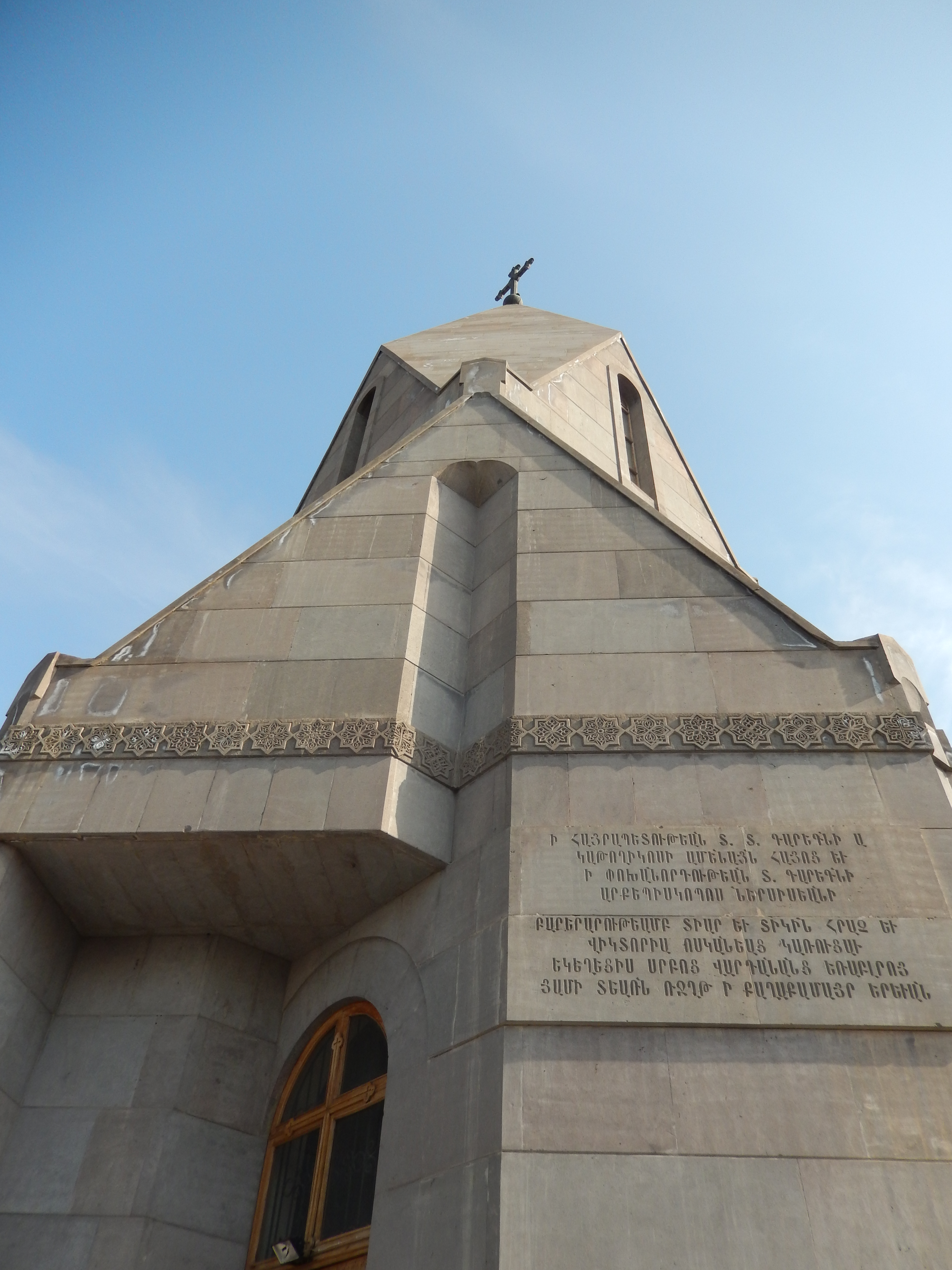
Excerpt from St. Vartanants Martyrs Church

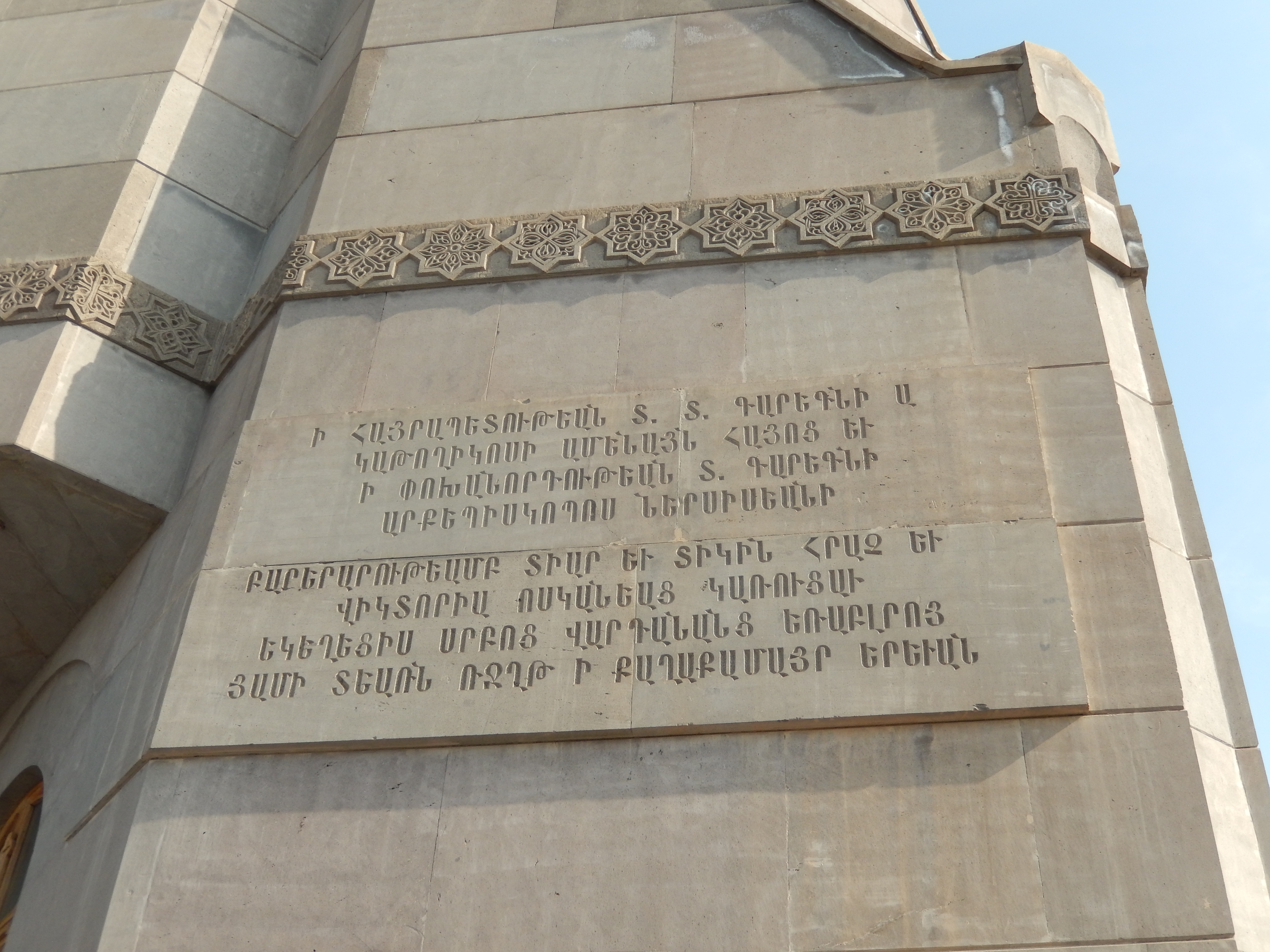
Engraving on the wall of St. Vartanants Martyrs Church

== See also ==
- St. Vartanants Church
