= Garo Kahkejian =

Armenian military commander

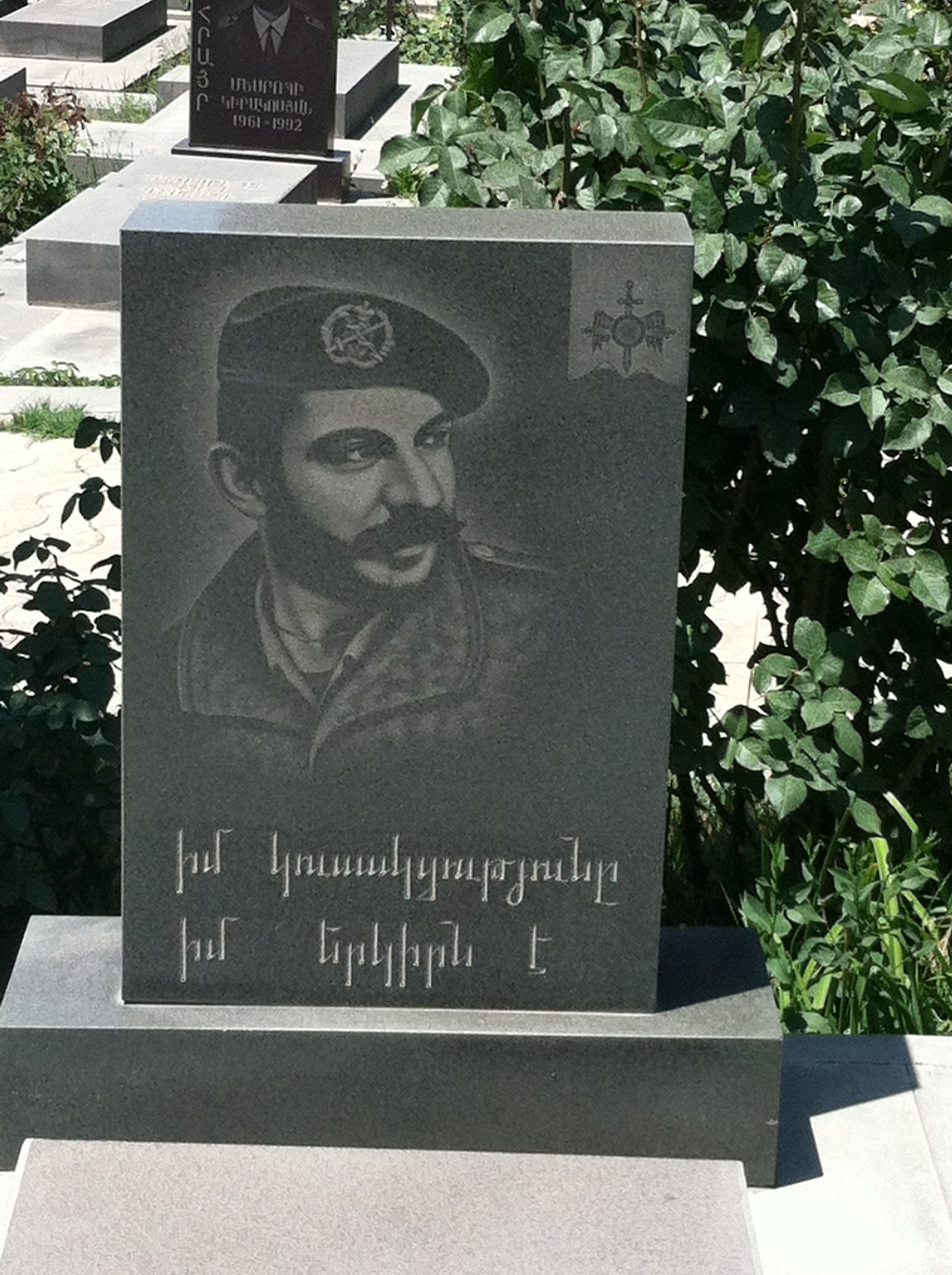
- Kahkejian's gravestone at Yerablur
- Nickname: "The White Bear"
- Born: 24 March 1962; Aleppo, Syria
- Died: 26 June 1993 (aged 31) Çardaqlı, Tartar, Azerbaijan
- Allegiance: Armenia
- Service years: 1989–1993
- Commands: Crusaders Detachment («Խաչակիրներ»)
- Conflicts: First Nagorno-Karabakh War; Mardakert and Martuni Offensives; Hadrut; Lachin; Battle of Kelbajar

Garo Kahkejian (Armenian: Կարօ Քահքէճեան [reformed orthography: Կարո Քահքեջյան]; 24 March 1962 – 26 June 1993) was a famed Armenian military commander and participant in the First Nagorno-Karabakh War. He was the founder and commander of the Khachakirner ("Crusaders") volunteer detachment, and was also known by his nickname "The White Bear" (Spitak Arj). Kahkedjian was the first Armenian from the diaspora who volunteered to go and fight in the Artsakh conflict.

== Biography ==
Kahkedjian was born in 1962 in Aleppo, Syria. His grandfather Sahak, commonly known by his nom de guerre Aslan, fought in Western Armenia and Artsakh during the time of the Armenian national liberation movement and was the bodyguard of General Drastamat Kanayan. After graduating from Armenian schools in Aleppo and Lebanon, he moved with his family to Nigeria. in 1978, he moved to Germany to receive a degree in architecture. He graduated from the Faculty of Mechanical Engineering of Frankfurt Engineering University. After his graduation, he lived in Fresno, California.

After the devastating 1988 Spitak earthquake, Kahkedjian arrived in Armenia for the first time, where he assisted the affected communities and helped raise funds from the diaspora.

In the wake of the interethnic violence in Azerbaijan, Kahkedjian organized the "Crusaders" detachment together with Shahe Ajemian and participated in the battles of Martuni, Hadrut, Martakert, Lachin and Kelbajar. During the battle for the height of "Pushkenyal" he fought with his detachment, thus keeping the height until the arrival of Armenian forces. Kahkedjian died on June 26, 1993, near Martakert in battles near the village Maghavuz. He was killed by small-arms fire, according to his brother Tro Kahkejian, who was also a member of the Crusaders unit.

Garo Kahkejian's body rests at the Yerablur military cemetery.
