= Qorqan, Shabran =

Qorqan
- Municipality
- Location within Azerbaijan
- Coordinates: 41°10′17″N 48°48′42″E
- Country: Azerbaijan
- Rayon: Shabran

Population
  - Total: 575
- Time zone: UTC+4 (AZT)
  - Summer (DST): UTC+5 (AZT)

Qorqan (also, Qorğan and Korgan) is a village and municipality in the Shabran Rayon of Azerbaijan. It has a population of 575. The municipality consists of the villages of Qorqan, Bilici Qorqan, and Izmara.
