= Güləh =

- Location within Azerbaijan
- Coordinates: 41°04′16″N 48°56′51″E
- Country: Azerbaijan
- Rayon: Davachi District
- Municipality: Çaraq
- Time zone: UTC+4 (AZT)
  - Summer (DST): UTC+5 (AZT)

Güləh (also, Gyulakh, Gyulekh, and Gyunesh) is a village in the Shabran District of Azerbaijan. The village forms part of the municipality of Çaraq.
