= Basentsi Azoyan =

Armenian Major-General and chief of the Intelligence Department

- Born: November 30, 1947; Vaghoudi, Sisian
- Died: June 12, 2006 (aged 58)
- Burial place: Yerablur pantheon
- Children: 2
- Military career
- Allegiance: Armenia
- Branch: General Staff
- Rank: Major-General
- Commands: Intelligence Department
- Awards: Order for Strengthening Partnership

Basentsi Azoyan (November 30, 1947, Vaghoudi, Sisian – 12 June 2006) was a Major-General and chief of the Intelligence Department of the Armenian armed forces general staff.

A graduate of the KGB’s Institute, from 1974 to 1995, Basentsi Azoyan occupied high posts in the national security system. In 1980-1982, he was detached to Iran and in 1983–1986 to Afghanistan. Since 1995, Basentsi Azoyan served in the Armenian armed forces. He was decorated with the orders for Military Service: Marshal Ivan Baghramian, Andranik Ozanyan, Garegin Nzhdeh, the order for Strengthening Partnership and the order for Irreproachable Service as well as with the USSR medals and orders.

He died at the age of 59 on June 12, 2006, and was buried at the Yerablur pantheon. Major-General Azoyan was married with two children.
