= Köhnədaxar =

- Location within Azerbaijan
- Coordinates: 40°49′15″N 48°18′58″E
- Country: Azerbaijan
- Rayon: Ismailli
- Municipality: Qaraqaya
- Time zone: UTC+4 (AZT)
  - Summer (DST): UTC+5 (AZT)

Köhnədaxar (also, Köhnədəhar, Këgnadakhar and Kekhna-Dakhar) is a village in the Ismailli Rayon of Azerbaijan. The village forms part of the municipality of Qaraqaya.
