= Qaraqaya, Ismailli =

Qaraqaya
- Municipality
- Location within Azerbaijan
- Coordinates: 40°47′54″N 48°18′03″E
- Country: Azerbaijan
- Rayon: Ismailli

Population
  - Total: 667
- Time zone: UTC+4 (AZT)
  - Summer (DST): UTC+5 (AZT)

Qaraqaya (also, Karakaya) is a village and municipality in the Ismailli Rayon of Azerbaijan. It has a population of 667. The municipality consists of the villages of Qaraqaya, Köhnədaxar, and Gəndov.
