= Düz Bilici =

- Municipality
- Location within Azerbaijan
- Coordinates: 41°09′40″N 48°51′03″E
- Country: Azerbaijan
- Rayon: Davachi

Population
  - Total: 270
- Time zone: UTC+4 (AZT)
  - Summer (DST): UTC+5 (AZT)

Düz Bilici (also, Düzbilici, Bilidzhikozma, and Dyuzbilidzhi) is a village and municipality in the Davachi Rayon of Azerbaijan. It has a population of 270. The municipality consists of the villages of Düz Bilici, Çinarlar, and Zağlı.
