= Gəndov, Lerik =

Gəndov
- Municipality
- Location within Azerbaijan
- Coordinates: 38°51′00″N 48°18′37″E
- Country: Azerbaijan
- Rayon: Lerik

Population
  - Total: 292
- Time zone: UTC+4 (AZT)
  - Summer (DST): UTC+5 (AZT)

Gəndov (also, Gyandov and Gendov) is a village and municipality in the Lerik Rayon of Azerbaijan. It has a population of 292.
