= Yerablur =

Military cemetery in Armenia

- Եռաբլուր
- Government of Armenia
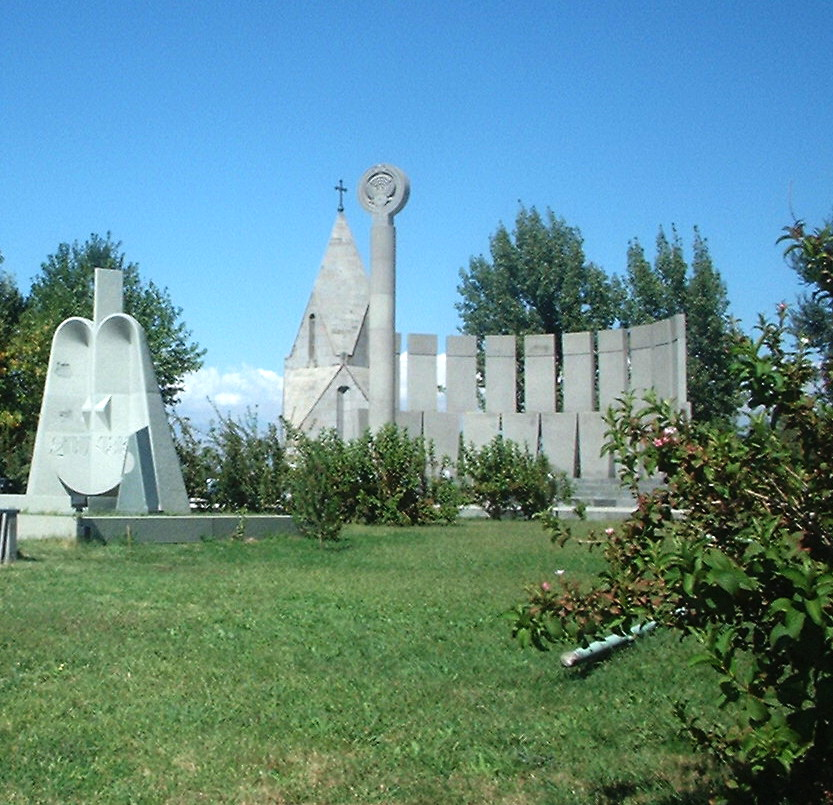
- For those who sacrificed their lives for the independence and freedom of Armenia and Artsakh
- Established: May 26, 1992
- Location: 40.159975°N 44.454214°E; Yerablur hilltop, Yerevan, Armenia

Yerablur (Armenian: Եռաբլուր, lit. 'based on three hills') or Yerablur Military Pantheon is a military cemetery located on a hilltop in the outskirts of Yerevan, Armenia. Since 1988, Yerablur has become the burial place of Armenian soldiers who died during the Nagorno-Karabakh conflict.

== History ==
On 26 May 1992, the status of the cemetery was approved by the order of the Government of Armenia.

== Layout ==
It is located in the western part of Yerevan, on the Yerablur hill, to the right of the Yerevan-Etchmiadzin highway. The height of the hill is 951 m, and the area of the pantheon is 19.22 ha. On the left side of the entrance to Yerablur is the chapel, in front of which is the Museum of the Fallen Freedom Fighters, next to it is the monument commemorating the 39 soldiers of the Armenian Secret Army for the Liberation of Armenia, further is the monument to the missing Freedom Fighters. In Yerablur are the graves of the National Heroes of Armenia Vazgen Sargsyan, Jivan Abrahamyan, Monte Melkonyan, the soldiers of Nagorno-Karabakh war many other notable Armenians. The complex is guarded by the military guard service of the pantheon. Since 1995, the Committee of the Parents of the Fallen Freedom Fighters of the Yerablur Military Pantheon has been functioning.

== Notable burials ==
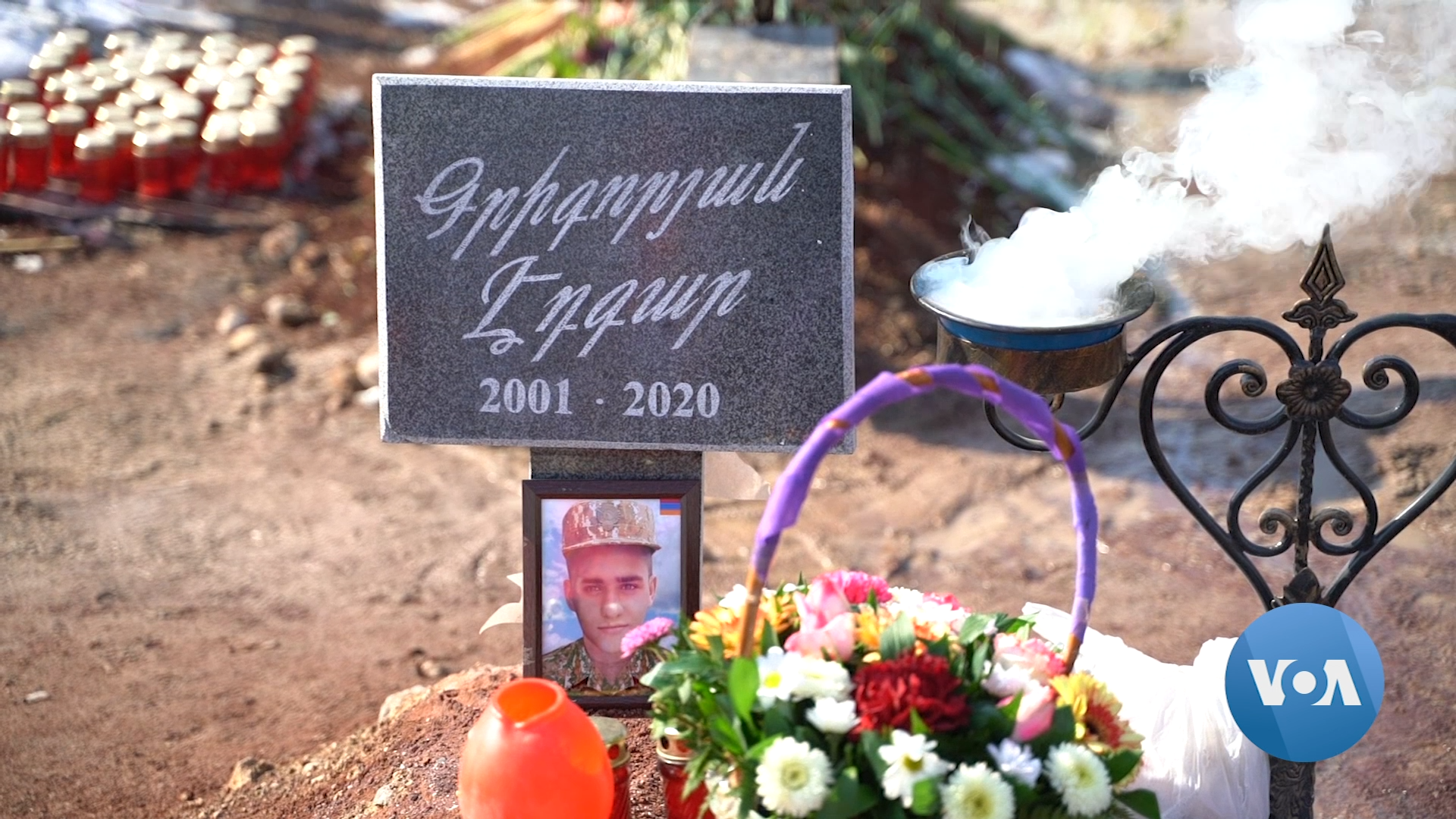
The grave of an Armenian soldier who was killed in combat during the Second Nagorno-Karabakh war

Many famous Armenian heroes are buried in this military cemetery, including:

- Vardan Stepanyan (1992)
- Gurbanmurad Nepesov (1992)
- Monte Melkonian (1993)
- Garo Kahkejian (1993)
- Shahen Meghrian (1993)
- Sose Mayrig (died in 1952, reburied at Yerablur in 1998)
- Vazgen Sargsyan (1999)
- Andranik (died in 1927, reburied at Yerablur in 2000)
- Gurgen Margaryan (2004)
- Basentsi Azoyan (2006)
- Sebouh Nersesian (died in 1940, reburied at Yerablur in 2014)
- Gourgen Yanikian (died in 1984, reburied in 2019)

All memorials from Yerablur military cemetery are available for viewing on hush.am genealogical website.

== Architecture ==
The authors of the plan and architectural solutions of the plan of Yerablur Pantheon are the architects of A. Mkhitaryan's Studio. The construction and construction works were carried out by "Hayaviashin" company. The tombstones are mainly made of basalt.

== Gallery ==
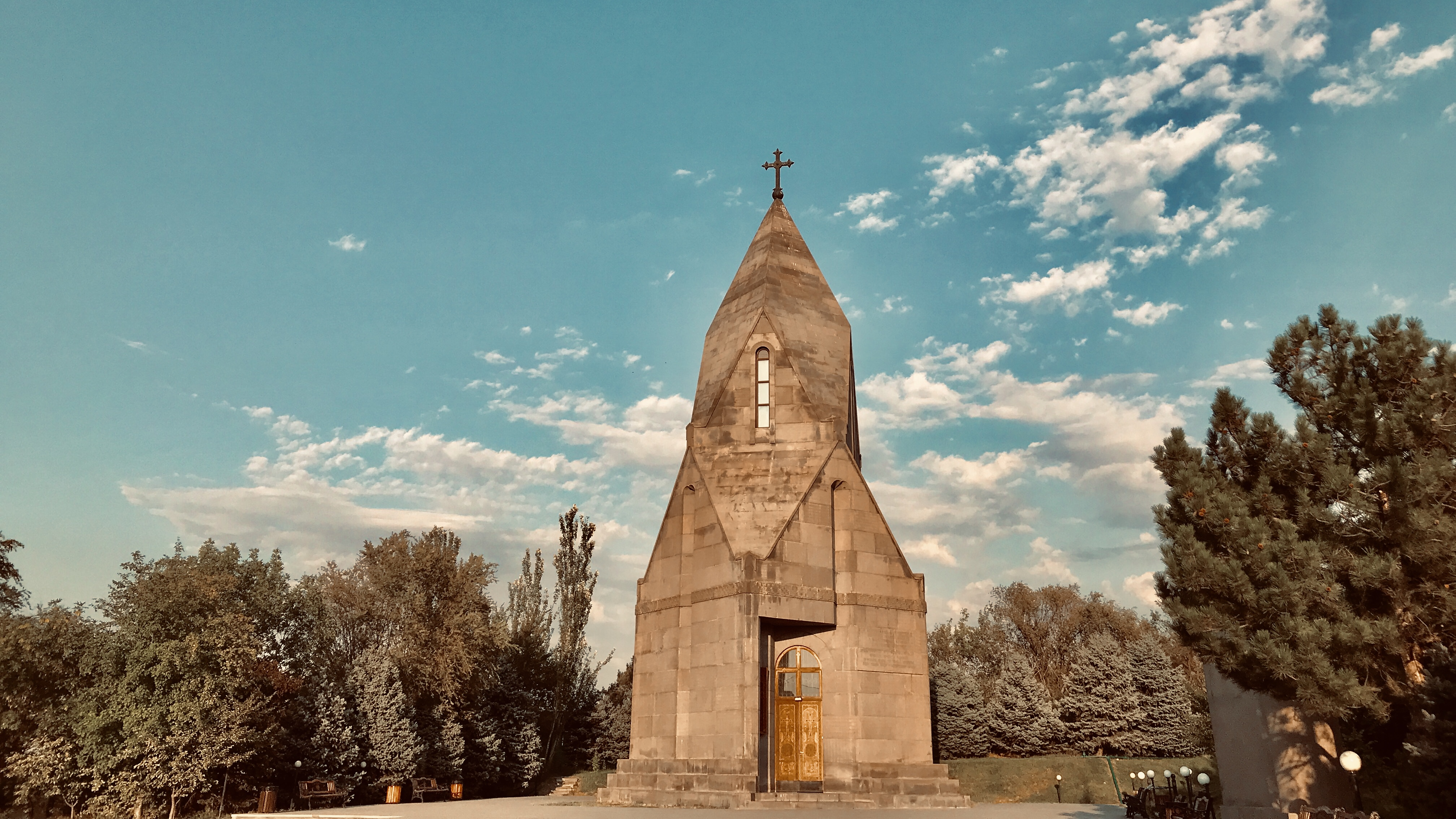
Holy Vartanants Martyrs Church

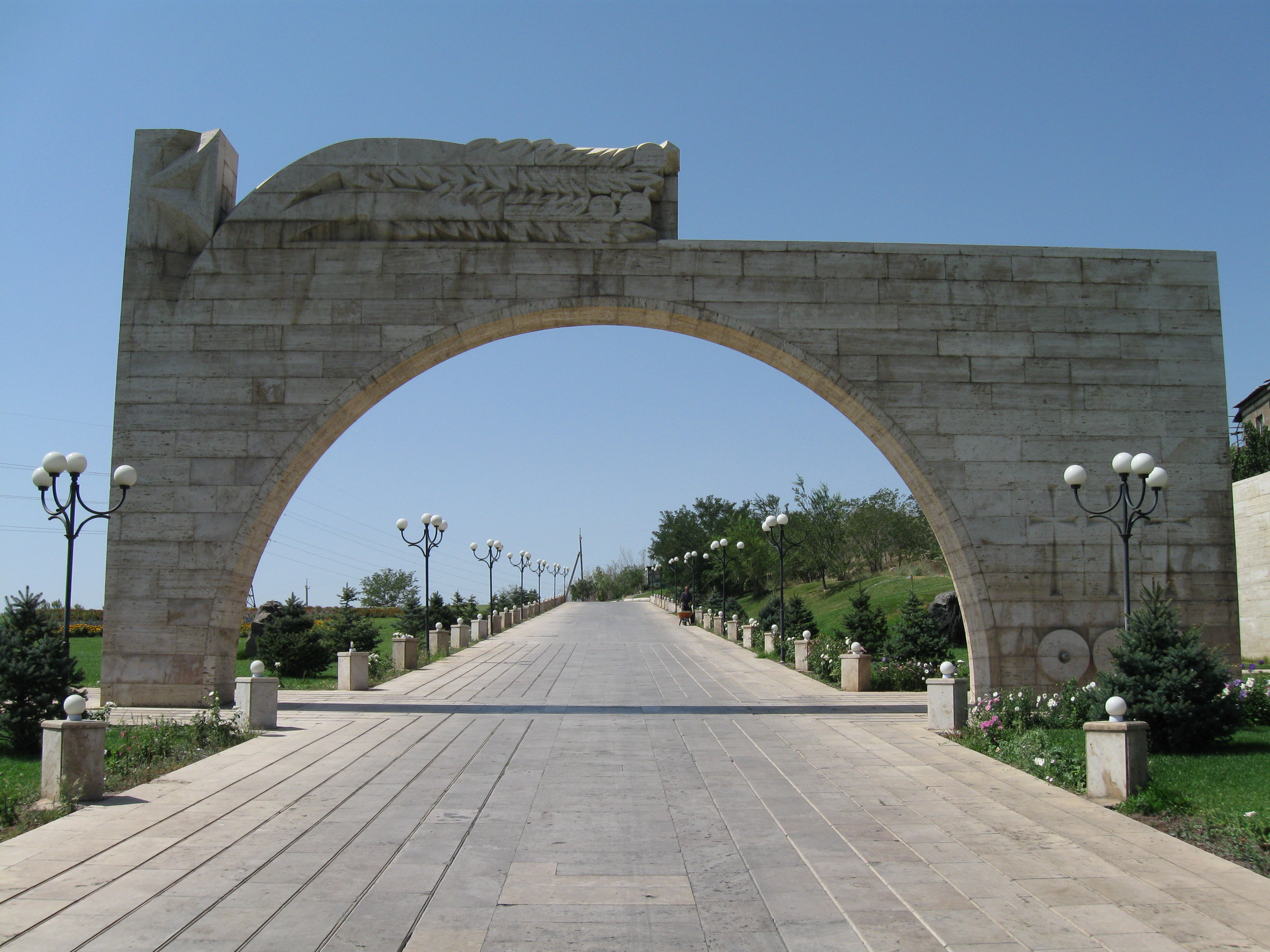
The main entrance

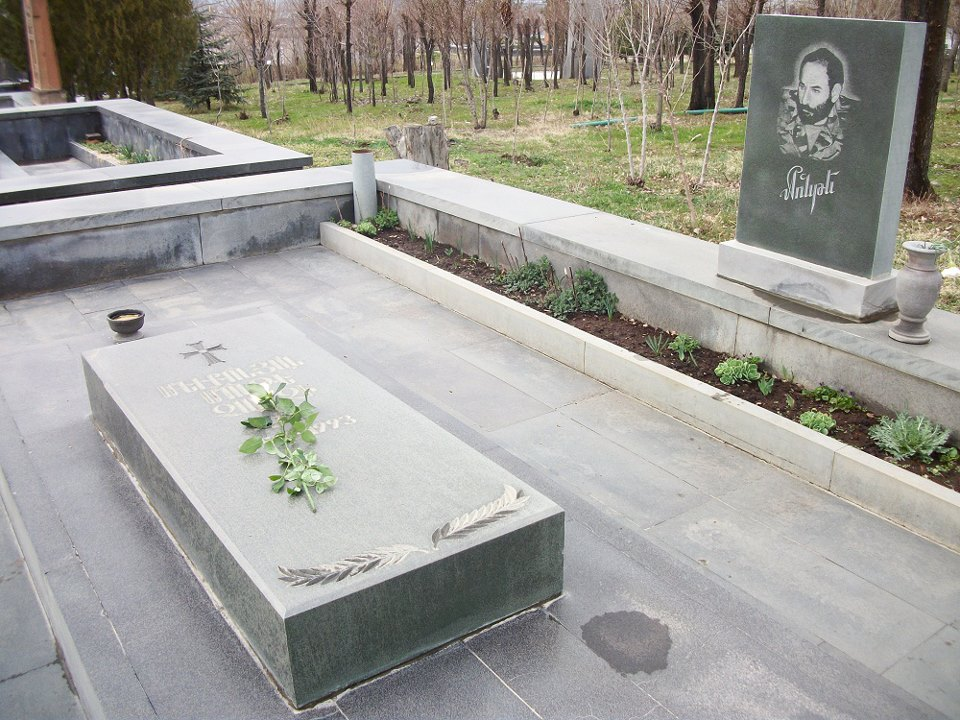
Monte Melkonian

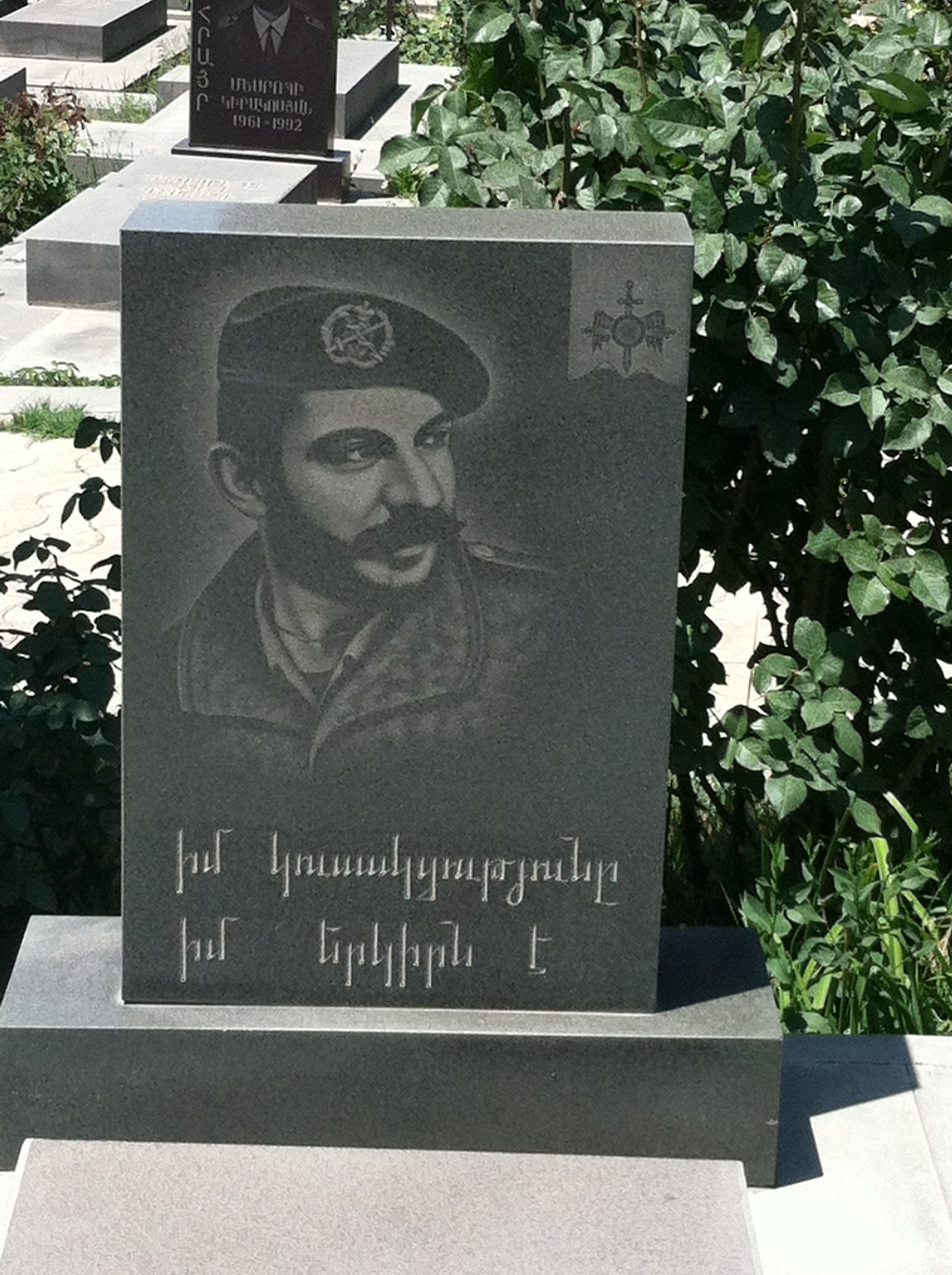
Garo Kahkejian

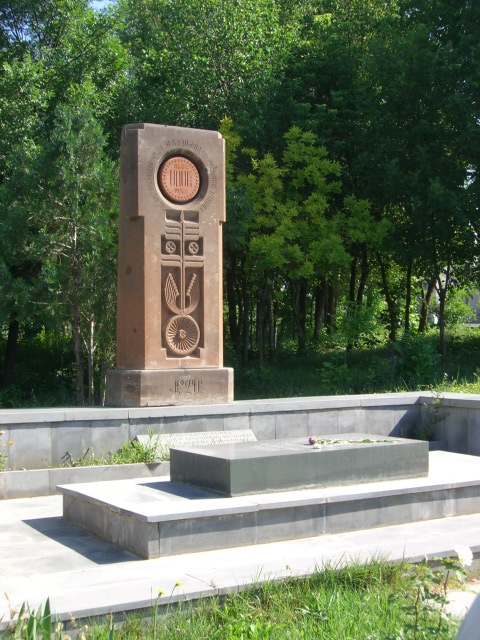
Sose Mayrig

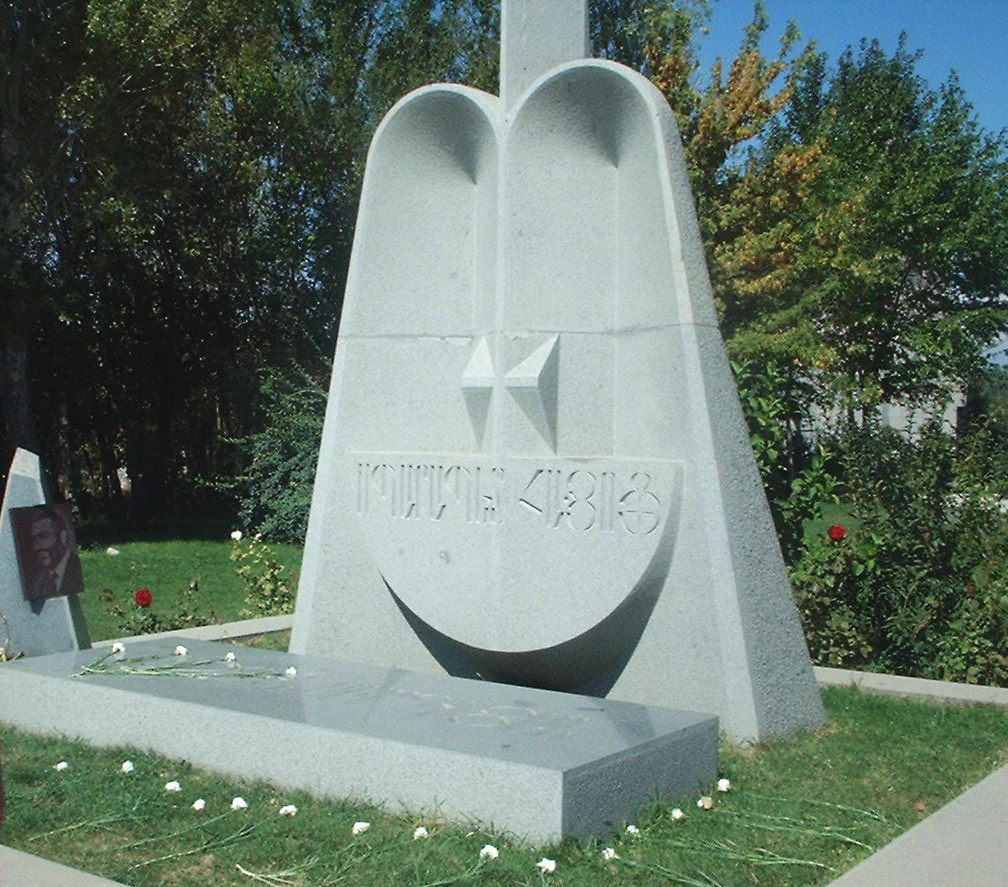
Vazgen Sargsyan

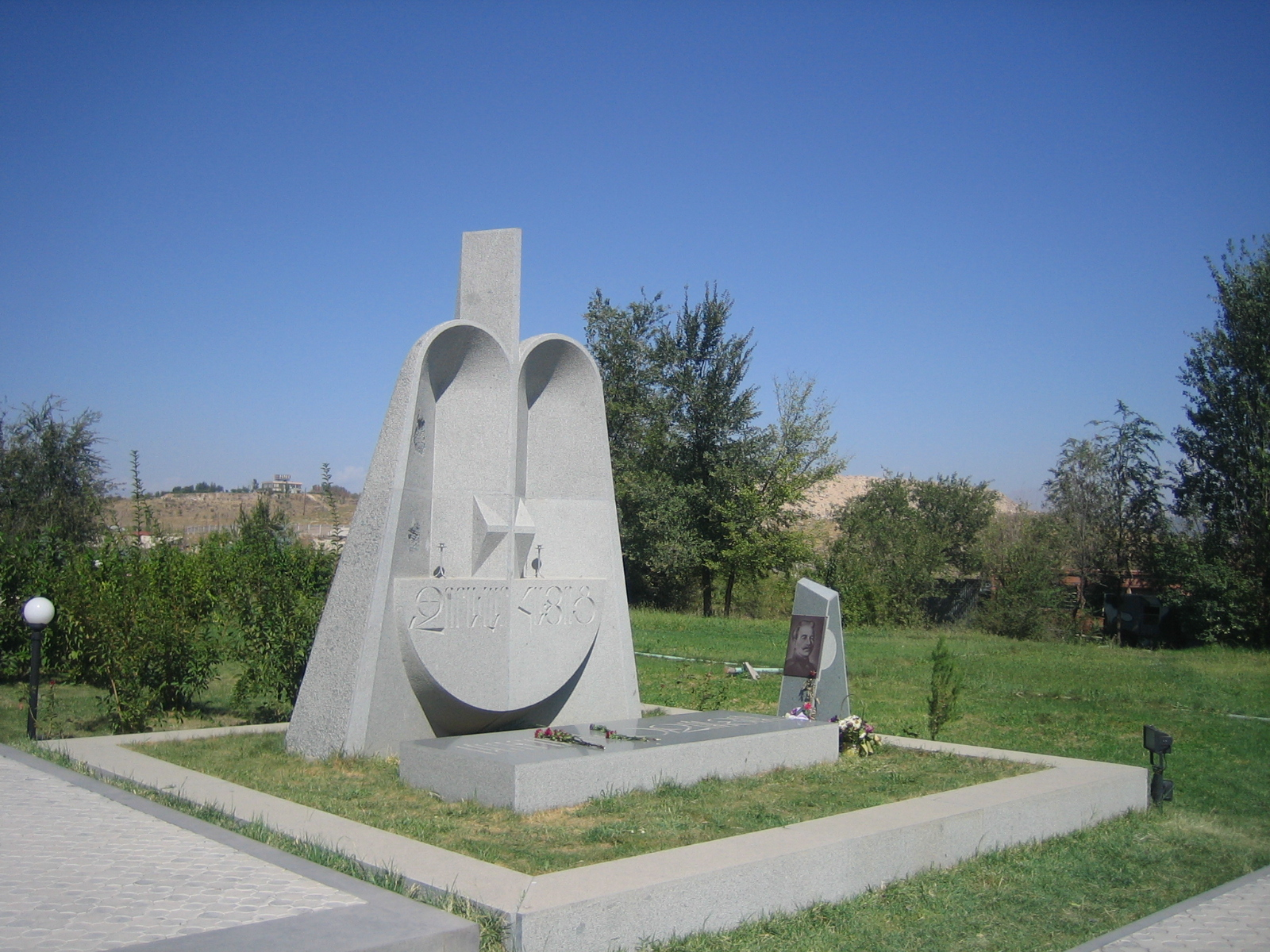
Andranik

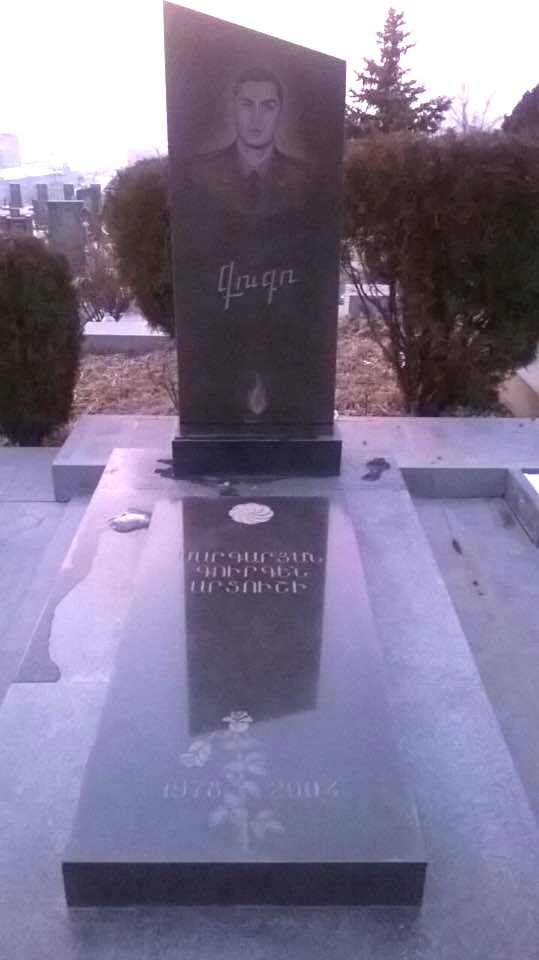
Gurgen Margaryan

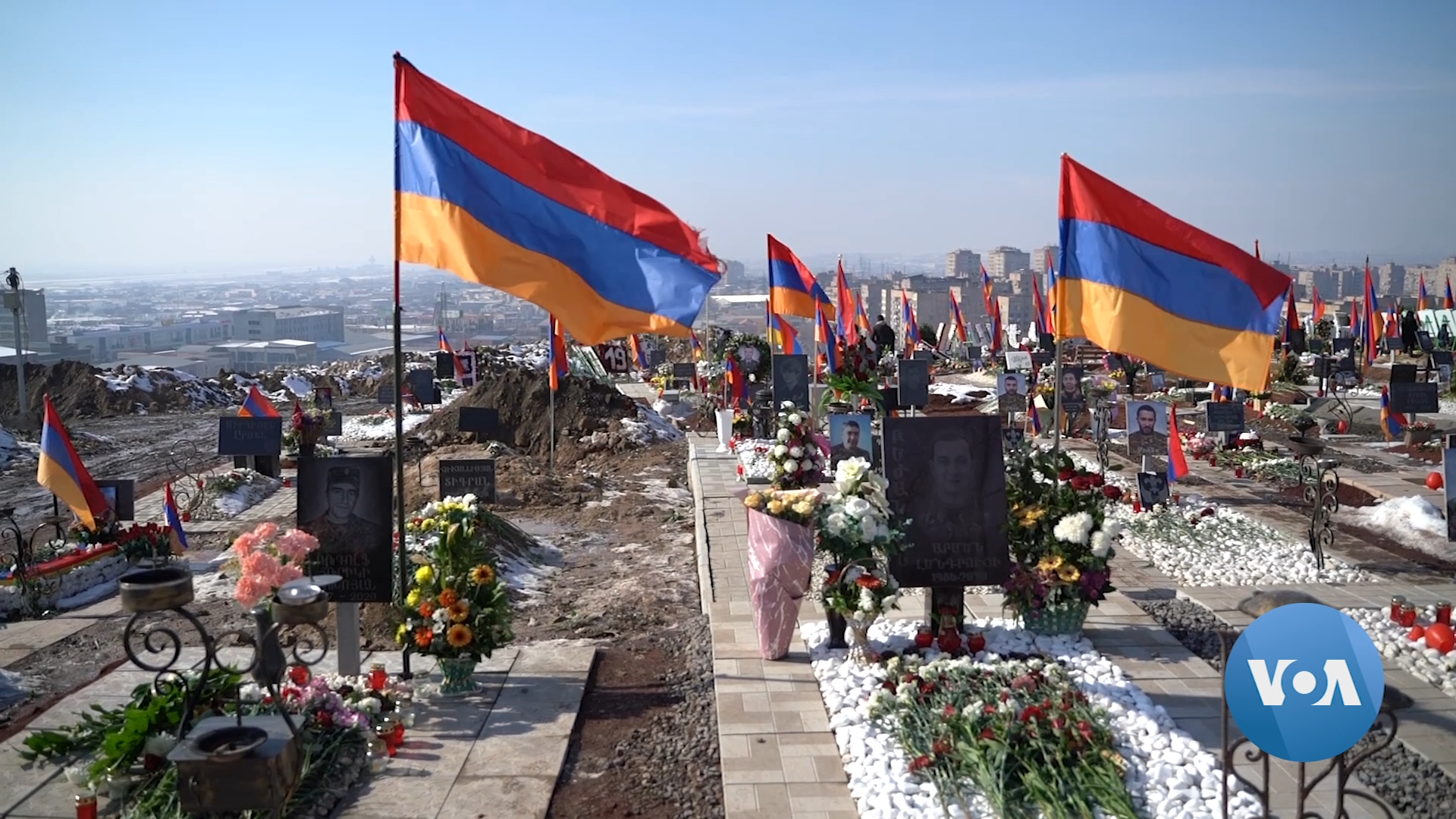
Yerablur in 2021

== See also ==
- Armenian fedayees
- Nagorno-Karabakh conflict
