= Bilići, Travnik =

Bilići
- Village
- Location within Bosnia and Herzegovina
- Coordinates: 44.237685°N 17.6156742°E
- Country: Bosnia and Herzegovina
- Entity: Federation of Bosnia and Herzegovina
- Canton: Central Bosnia
- Municipality: Travnik

Area
  - Total: 0.46 sq mi (1.20 km^{2})

Population (2013)
  - Total: 287
  - Density: 619/sq mi (239/km^{2})
- Time zone: UTC+1 (CET)
  - Summer (DST): UTC+2 (CEST)

Bilići is a village in the municipality of Travnik, Bosnia and Herzegovina.

== Demographics ==
According to the 2013 census, its population was 287.

Ethnicity in 2013
Ethnicity	Number	Percentage
Croats	267	93.0%
Bosniaks	18	6.3%
Serbs	1	0.3%
other/undeclared	1	0.3%
Total	287	100%
