= Myurishen =

Myurishen Մյուրիշեն
- Mirikənd
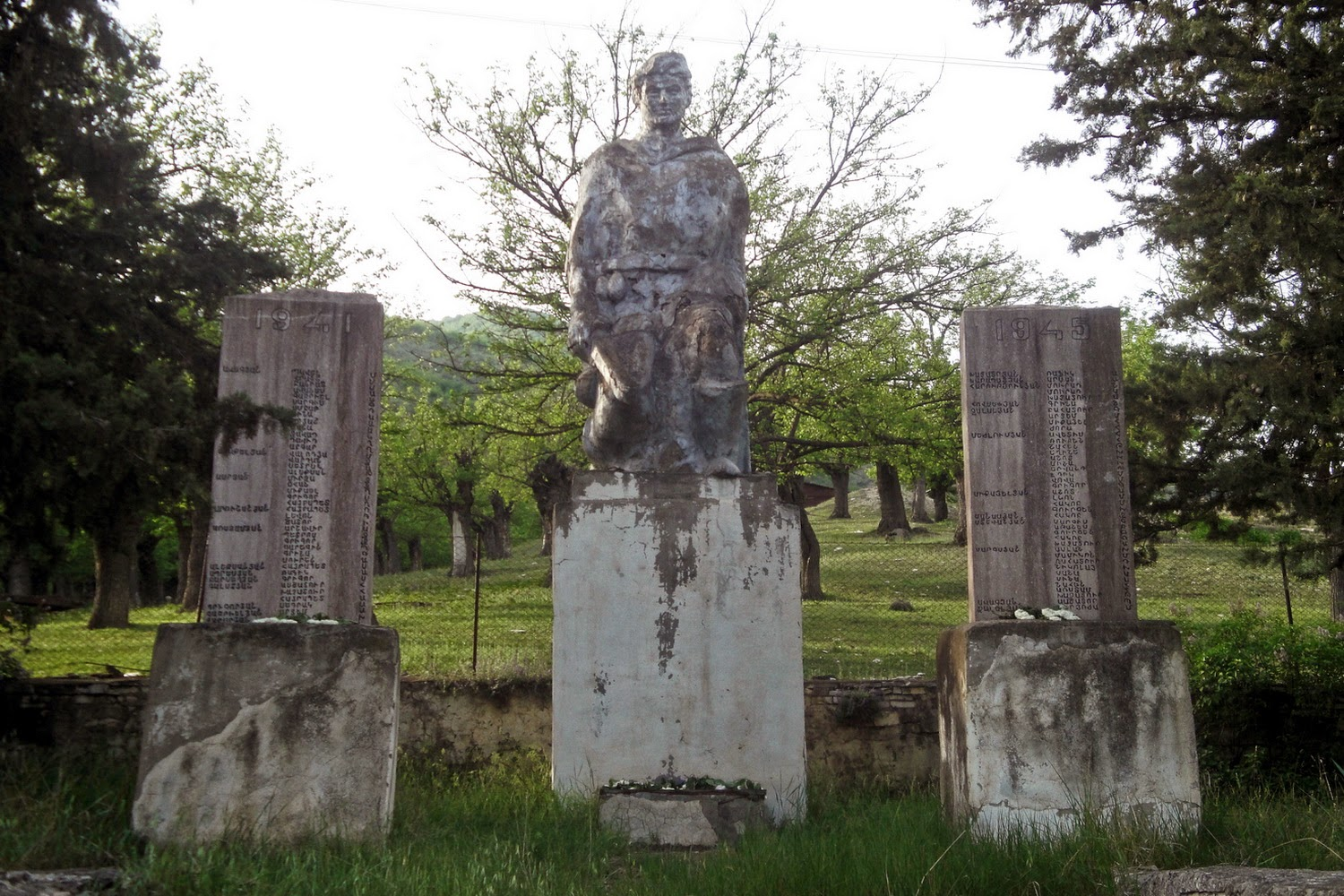
- WWII memorial in Myurishen

- Location within Azerbaijan Location within Karabakh Economic Region
- Coordinates: 39°50′33″N 46°55′10″E
- Country: Azerbaijan
  - District: Khojavend

Population (2015)
  - Total: 160
- Time zone: UTC+4 (AZT)

Myurishen (Armenian: Մյուրիշեն, also Mirushen, Միրուշեն) or Mirikend (Azerbaijani: Mirikənd) is a village in the Khojavend District of Azerbaijan, in the disputed region of Nagorno-Karabakh. Until 2023 it was controlled by the breakaway Republic of Artsakh. The village had an ethnic Armenian-majority population until the expulsion of the Armenian population of Nagorno-Karabakh by Azerbaijan following the 2023 Azerbaijani offensive in Nagorno-Karabakh.

== History ==
During the Soviet period, the village was a part of the Martuni District of the Nagorno-Karabakh Autonomous Oblast.

== Historical heritage sites ==
Historical heritage sites in and around the village include a cemetery from between the 15th and 17th centuries, the church of Surb Astvatsatsin (Armenian: Սուրբ Աստվածածին, lit. 'Holy Mother of God') built in 1869, and a 19th-century watermill.

== Economy and culture ==
The population is mainly engaged in agriculture and animal husbandry. As of 2015, the village has a municipal building, a house of culture, a school, and a medical centre.

== Demographics ==
The village had 200 inhabitants in 2005, and 160 inhabitants in 2015. The Armenian population was expelled in 2023 after Azerbaijan's military offensive that led to the dissolution of the Nagorno-Karabakh Republic.
