= Vələsli, Ismailli =

Vələsli
- Location within Azerbaijan
- Coordinates: 40°46′41″N 47°51′44″E
- Country: Azerbaijan
- Rayon: Ismailli
- Time zone: UTC+4 (AZT)
  - Summer (DST): UTC+5 (AZT)

Vələsli (also, Velasli) is a village in the Ismailli Rayon of Azerbaijan.
