= Xəlfələr, Masally =

Xəlfələr
- Municipality
- Location within Azerbaijan
- Coordinates: 39°01′N 48°36′E
- Country: Azerbaijan
- Rayon: Masally

Population
  - Total: 660
- Time zone: UTC+4 (AZT)
  - Summer (DST): UTC+5 (AZT)

Xəlfələr (also, Khalfalar and Khal’fyalyar) is a village and municipality in the Masally Rayon of Azerbaijan. It has a population of 660.
