= Gəndov, Davachi =

Gəndov
- Municipality
- Location within Azerbaijan
- Coordinates: 41°15′45″N 48°54′19″E
- Country: Azerbaijan
- Rayon: Davachi

Population
  - Total: 2,296
- Time zone: UTC+4 (AZT)
  - Summer (DST): UTC+5 (AZT)

Gəndov (also, Gəndav, Ashagyy-Gendob, Bash-Gendob, and Yukhary Gyandov) is a village and municipality in the Davachi Rayon of Azerbaijan. It has a population of 2,296.
