= Qorqan, Fuzuli =

Qorqan
- Location within Azerbaijan Location within Karabakh Economic Region
- Coordinates: 39°33′35″N 47°16′53″E
- Country: Azerbaijan
- District: Fuzuli
- Time zone: UTC+4 (AZT)

Qorqan (Gorgan) is a village in the Fuzuli District of Azerbaijan. It was under the occupation of ethnic Armenian forces since the First Nagorno-Karabakh war, however, it was recaptured by Azerbaijan on 7 November 2020.
