= Şabran =

Shabran Şabran
- City & Municipality
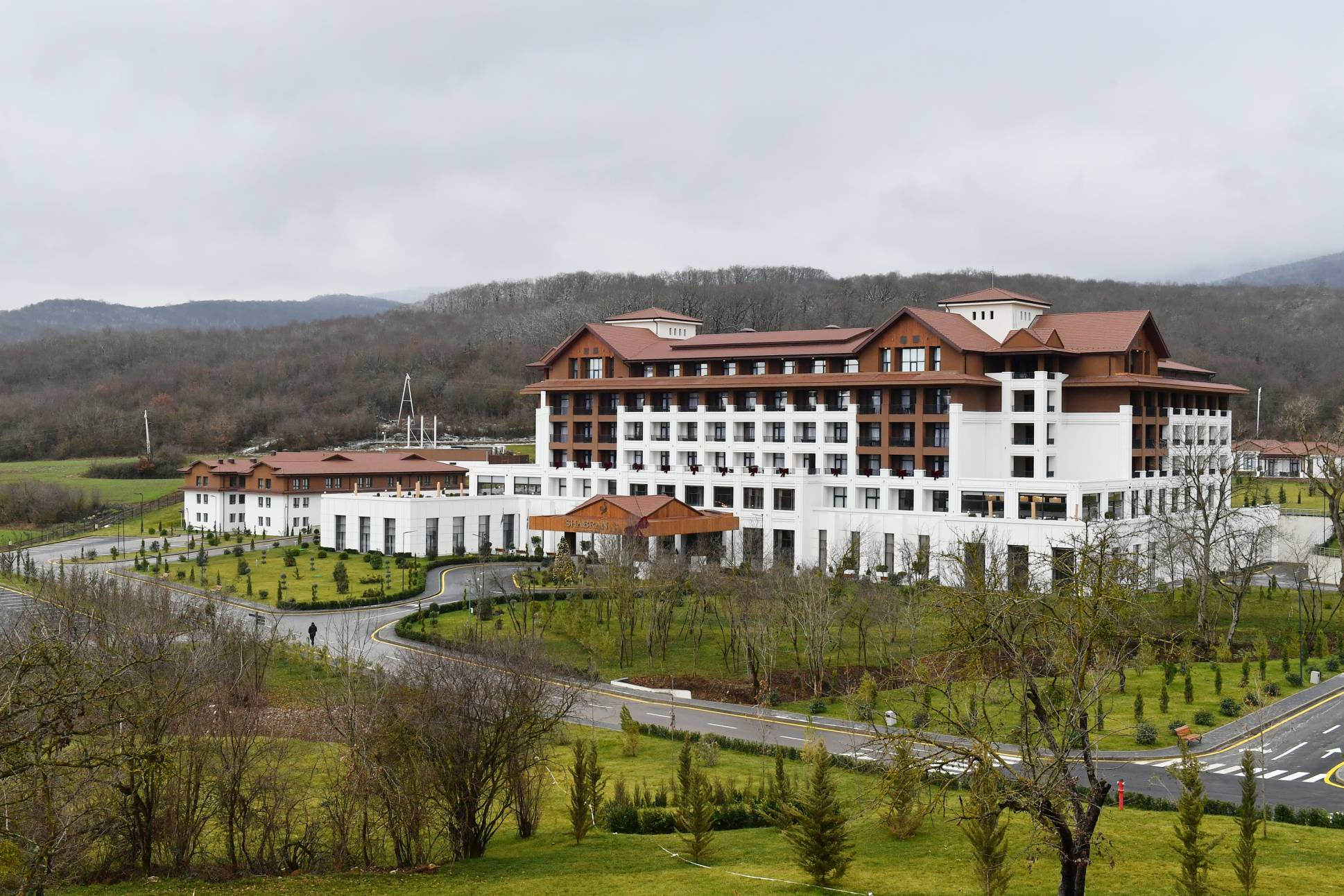

- Location within Azerbaijan
- Coordinates: 41°12′41″N 48°59′10″E
- Country: Azerbaijan
- District: Shabran
- Founded: 1961

Area
  - Total: 8.4 km^{2} (3.2 sq mi)
- Elevation: 33 m (108 ft)

Population (2010)
  - Total: 23,248
  - Density: 2,800/km^{2} (7,200/sq mi)
- Time zone: UTC+4 (AZT)
- Area code: +994 115

Shabran (Azerbaijani: Şabran) , (Tat: Şabran) is a city in and the capital of the Shabran District of Azerbaijan.

== History ==
Known as Davachi (Azerbaijani: Dəvəçi) until 2010, Shabran received city status in 1961. The name of Shabran comes from an historic medieval town of the same name that was a port some 15km further north.

== Demographics ==
The officially registered population of Shabran in 2010 was 23,248. Azerbaijanis and Tats are the largest ethnic groups.

== Transport ==
Shabran Railway Station
