= Gəndov, Ismailli =

Gəndov
- Location within Azerbaijan
- Coordinates: 40°49′16″N 48°20′08″E
- Country: Azerbaijan
- Rayon: Ismailli
- Municipality: Qaraqaya
- Time zone: UTC+4 (AZT)
  - Summer (DST): UTC+5 (AZT)

Gəndov (also, Cəndov, Gendob, Gyandov, and Gyandova) is a village in the Ismailli Rayon of Azerbaijan. The village forms part of the municipality of Qaraqaya.
