= Shabran District =

District in northeastern Azerbaijan

Coordinates: 41°12′N 49°00′E

- District
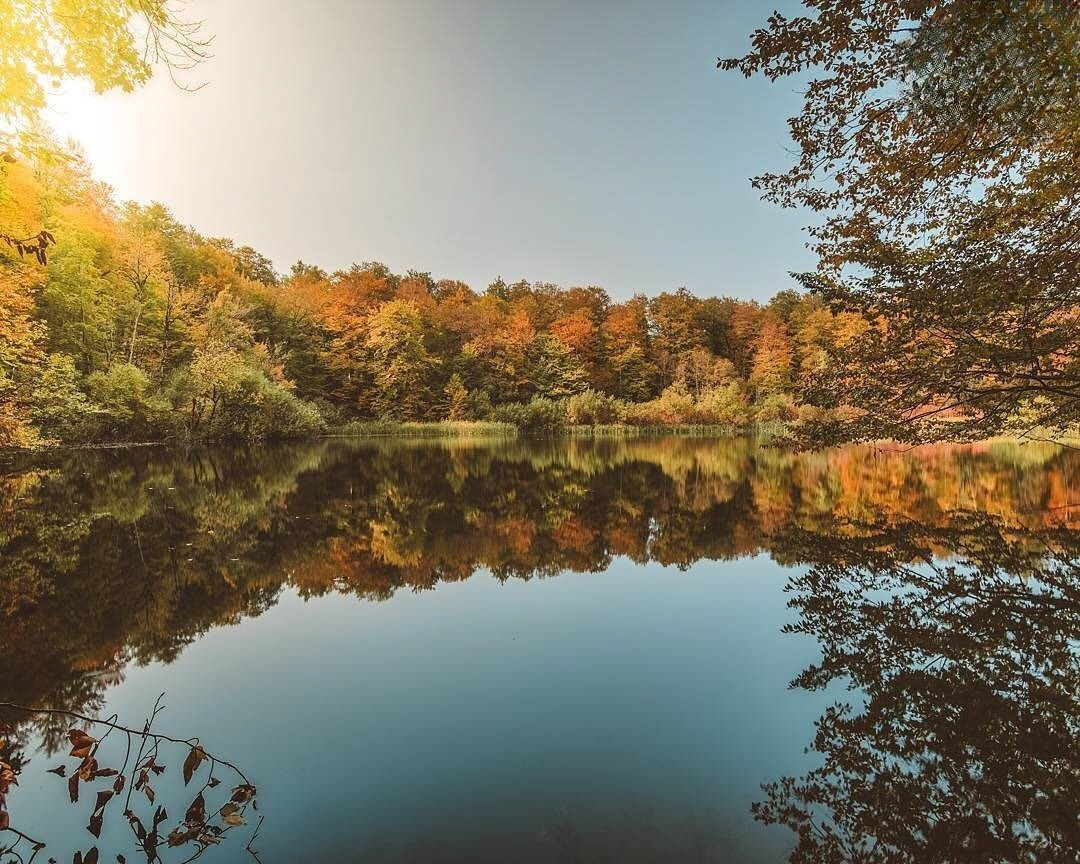

- Map of Azerbaijan showing Shabran District
- Country: Azerbaijan
- Economic regions of Azerbaijan: Guba-Khachmaz
- Region: Europe
- Established: 8 August 1930
- Capital: Shabran
- Settlements: 69

Government
  - Governor: Asif Huseynov

Area
  - Total: 1,090 km^{2} (420 sq mi)

Population (2020)
  - Total: 59,900
  - Density: 55.0/km^{2} (142/sq mi)
- Time zone: UTC+4 (AZT)
- Postal code: 1700
- Website: www.shabran-ih.gov.az

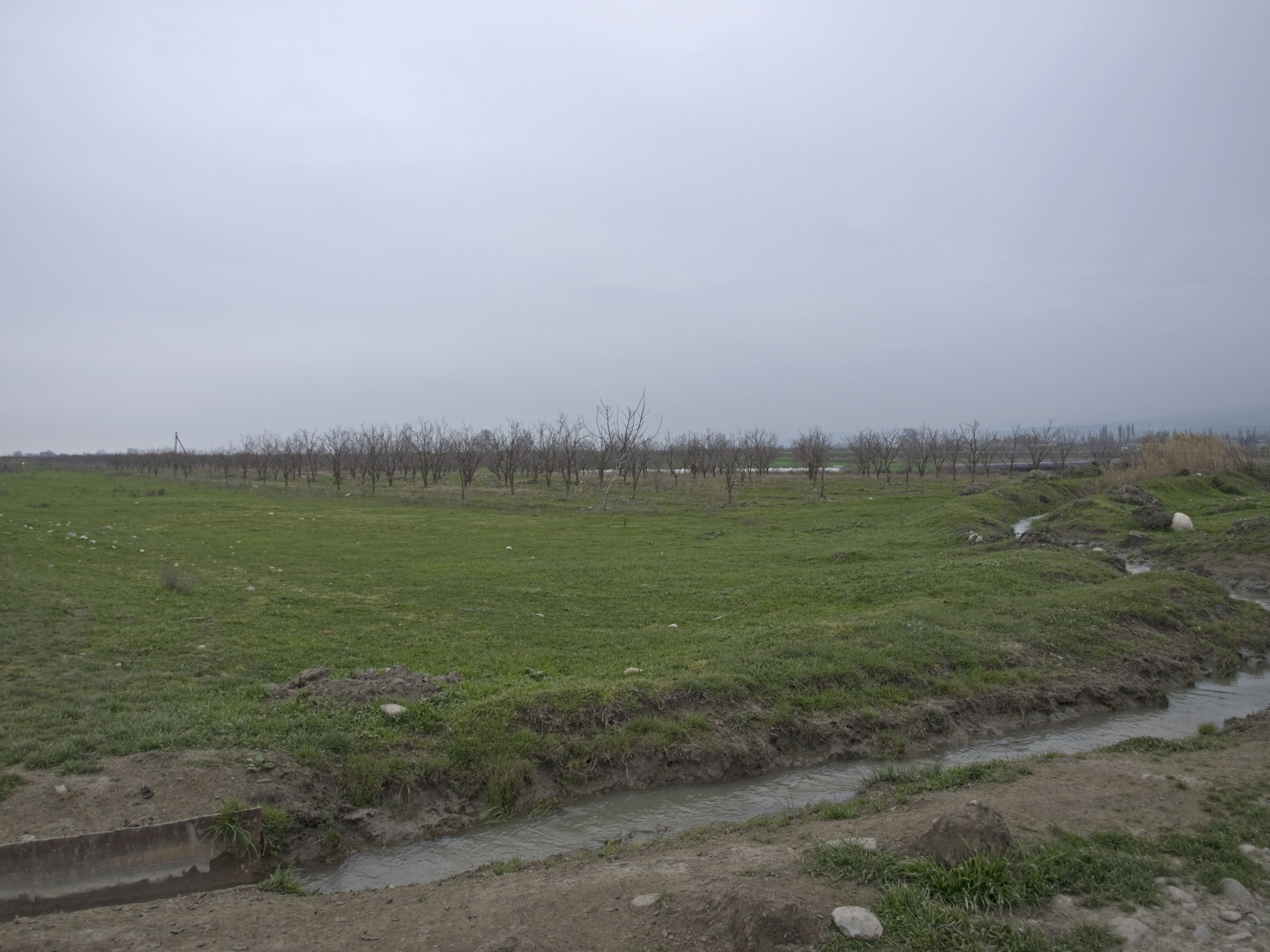
Orchards north of Gəndov

Shabran District (Azerbaijani: Şabran rayonu) is one of the 66 districts of Azerbaijan. It is located in the northeast of the country, in the Guba-Khachmaz Economic Region. The district borders the districts of Khachmaz, Quba, Khizi and Siyazan. Its capital and largest city is Shabran. As of 2020, the district had a population of 59,900.

== History ==
The district was formed as Davachi District on August 8, 1930. It was abolished and included in Absheron District in 1963; however, two years later, the district was re-established. In 1992, the new Siazan District was formed south of modern Shabran District by the order of the National Assembly of Azerbaijan, which included part of Davachi District's territory. In 2010, the district was renamed Shabran District.

== Geography ==
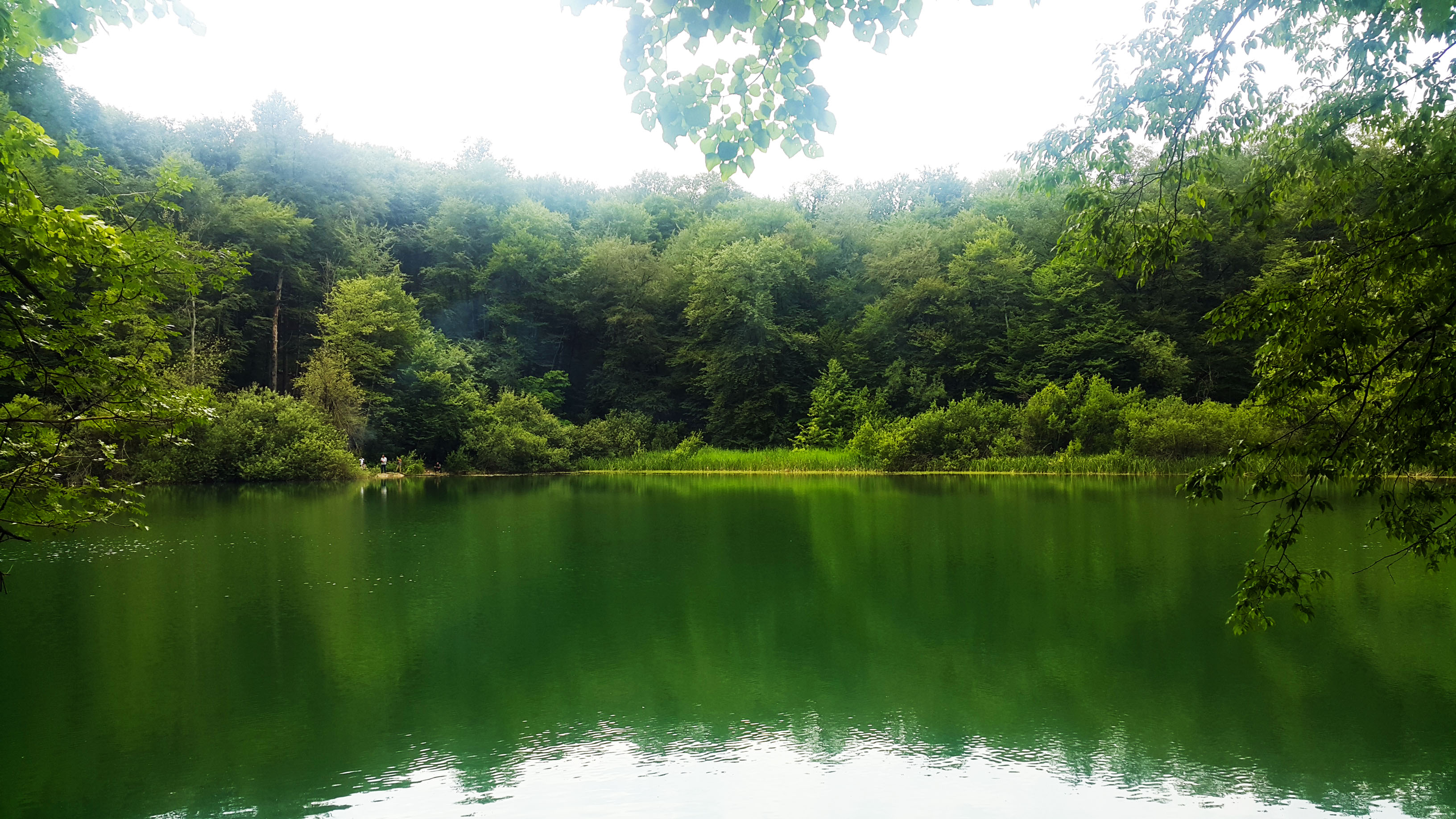
Anbil lake, Shabran, Azerbaijan

The greater part of the district is mountainous. The Caspian Sea is located 12 km from Shabran city. The district borders upon Quba, Khachmaz, Shamakhi and Siazan Districts. Forests occupy 27000 ha in mountainous territories and plains near the Caspian Sea, and they are of great importance with their climatic and natural resources for the district. The Shabran and Davachi Rivers flow through the district's territory, and the Valvalachay and Gilgilchay Rivers flow in northern and southern borders directly to the Caspian Sea. Samur-Davachi lowland has an altitude of −28 m below the world ocean level.

Shabran District is geographically located in Europe in the northeastern part of the Greater Caucasus. There are also mud volcanoes in the area. Breeds of the Cretaceous, Paleogene and Neogene periods spread in mountainous parts, but breeds of Anthropogenic period spread in low-lying parts. The territory is rich of oil, gas, gravel, sand, clay, and other natural resources. Medicinal mineral waters, “Galaalty” sanatorium, high-temperature Khaltan springs are broadly used by the population.

The climate in lowlands and low-mountainous parts is warm and subtropical, but in mountainous parts it is mild and cold. The summer of the district is dry, and the amount of annual precipitation is not more than 300–600 mm. Brown mountainous-forest, mountainous-chestnut, light-chestnut soils spread in mountainous areas, but alkaline, grey, brown, and other soils spread in low-lying parts. There are sandstones on the seashore. Vegetation cover consists of bush tangles, rare forest meadows, semi-deserts covered with glades, or semi-deserts covered both with glades and saline. The district is rich for its fauna and birds of various species.

== Population ==
According to the annual report of the State Statistical Committee, every year the total number of people is increasing. In comparison to 2010, the statistical indicator for the population rose by 6,500 and reached 58,700 people in 2018. There is an increase of approximately 12.5 percent. Of the total population, 29,900 are men and 28,800 are women. At the beginning of 2018, the number of young people aged 14–29 in the region was 15,100 people. Among these, 7,800 are men and 7,300 are women.

The population of Shabran (at the beginning of the year, thousand persons)
Region	2000	2001	2002	2003	2004	2005	2006	2007	2008	2009	2010	2011	2012	2013	2014	2015	2016	2017	2018
Shabran region	46,4	46,8	47,3	47,8	48,2	48,7	49,3	49,9	50,5	51,3	52,2	53,0	53,9	54,7	55,5	56,3	57,2	58,0	58,7
urban population	20,4	20,5	20,7	20,9	21,1	21,3	21,5	21,7	21,9	22,2	22,6	23,0	23,3	23,6	24,0	24,2	24,5	24,8	25,1
rural population	26,0	26,3	26,6	26,9	27,1	27,4	27,8	28,2	28,6	29,1	29,6	30,0	30,6	31,1	31,5	32,1	32,7	33,2	33,6

The majority of the population in the district are Azerbaijanis (54,942), and the second biggest ethnic group are Tats. According to the 2009 census, the ethnic distribution is as below:

Ethnic group	Quantity(according to 2009 census)
Azerbaijani	54 942
Tat ethnic group	1 967
Turkish	1 376
Lezgi	70
Russians	32
Tatar	8
Ukrainian	2
Other	17
total	58.300

== Economy of district ==
According to 2014 data, overall production reaches 165902.4 thousand manats. The main sectors of this district are building (42107.9 manats) and agriculture (83113.8 manats). The overall income of the district is 4561.3 thousand manats and spending equals 11825.6 thousand manats according to the 2014 statistic. The district includes villages, such as Allahyarlı.

== Historical monuments ==
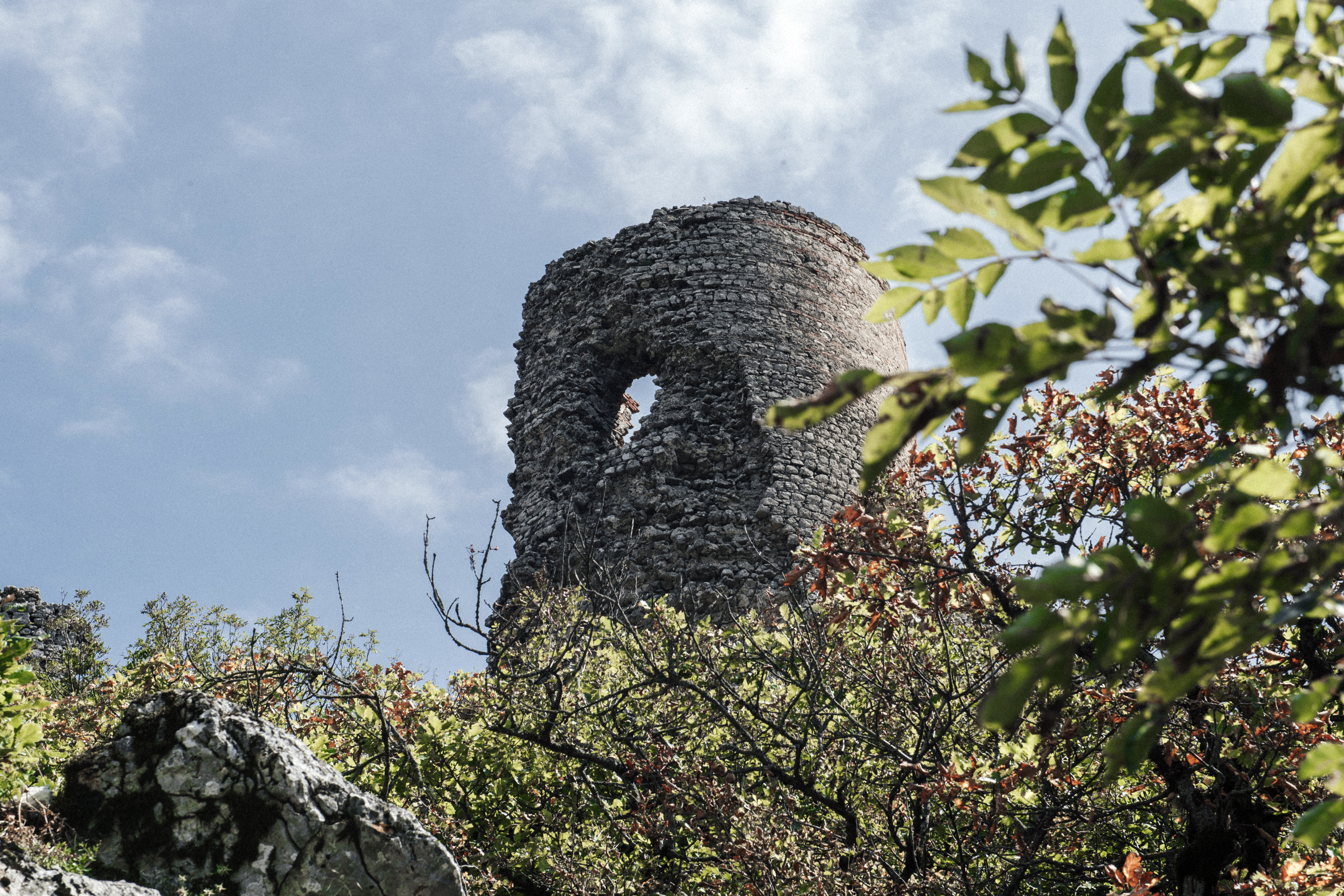
Çıraqqala Şabran

One of the oldest monuments is Chirag Gala in the Charmin Village. It's located on a 1,232 metres (4,042 ft) slope and was built in the fifth-sixth centuries.

The Silk Road passed through the territory of the modern district, including its capital, Shabran. It was one of the locations for caravans of camels to stay and rest.
