= Adam Sahakyan =

Armenian military personnel (1996–2016)

- Native name: Ադամ Սահակյան
- Born: August 19, 1996; Yerevan, Armenia
- Died: April 2, 2016 (aged 19) Nagorno-Karabakh Republic (de facto)
- Buried: Yerablur Military Pantheon
- Allegiance: Armenia; Artsakh
- Branch: Armed Forces of Armenia; Nagorno-Karabakh Defence Army
- Rank: Sergeant
- Conflicts: Four-Day War
- Awards: Hero of Artsakh

Adam Sahakyan (Armenian: Ադամ Սահակյան; 19 August 1996, Yerevan – 2 April 2016, Jrakan) was an Armenian sergeant of the Armed Forces of Armenia and the Nagorno-Karabakh Defense Army. In 2016 he was posthumously awarded the Hero of Artsakh military award, which is the highest honorary title of the self-proclaimed Republic of Artsakh.

== Early life ==
He was born in the family of the journalist and director Gayane Antonyan and Khachatur Sahakyan. He has an elder brother Mushegh Sahakyan. He studied at high school №114 after Khachik Dashtents from 2002 to 2013. In 2013 Sahakyan entered the architectural design department of the Yerevan State University of Architecture and Construction of Armenia.

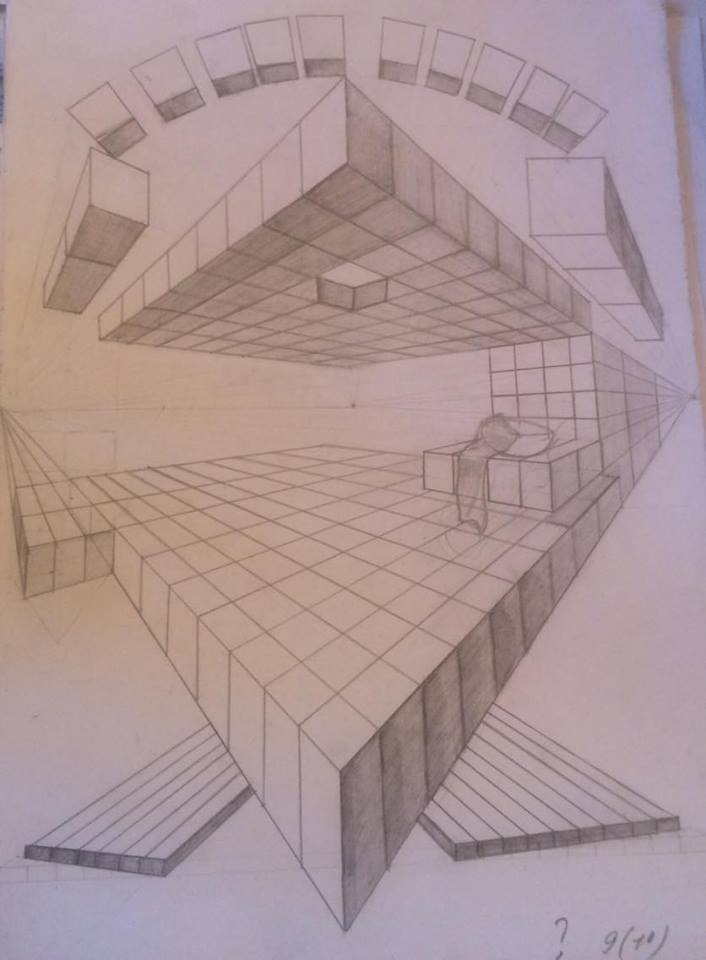
architectural design

He practiced sports, received a yellow belt in karate, and engaged in other types of martial arts, including boxing.

== Military service ==
Sahakyan started the mandatory military service by conscription 2014/2 from «Kentron» Military Comissariat.

On 26 January 2015 he was drafted into the Army. He was serving in Nagorno-Karabakh Republic army. Due to the high performance he has got the rank of Sergeant.

== The Four-Day War ==
On the nights of 1–2 April 2016 The Republic of Azerbaijan made a large-scale attack on Artsakh It is known as the 2016 Four Day War. Sahakyan was serving in a border guard battalion, in the morning of April 1 he ascended to the post, at the very night Azerbaijan attacked Artsakh. Sahakyan reported to Senior Lieutenant Harutyun Nalbandian that the position was being attacked. At the same time the enemy was trying to break into the combat position 112, the border defence forces consisting of 8 people, headed by Sahakyan went to the all-round defence. Sahakyan acted according to the combat duty, and due to this the enemy was not able to win the position for 4–5 hours. He died from serious gunshot wounds on the face and body.

== Funeral ==
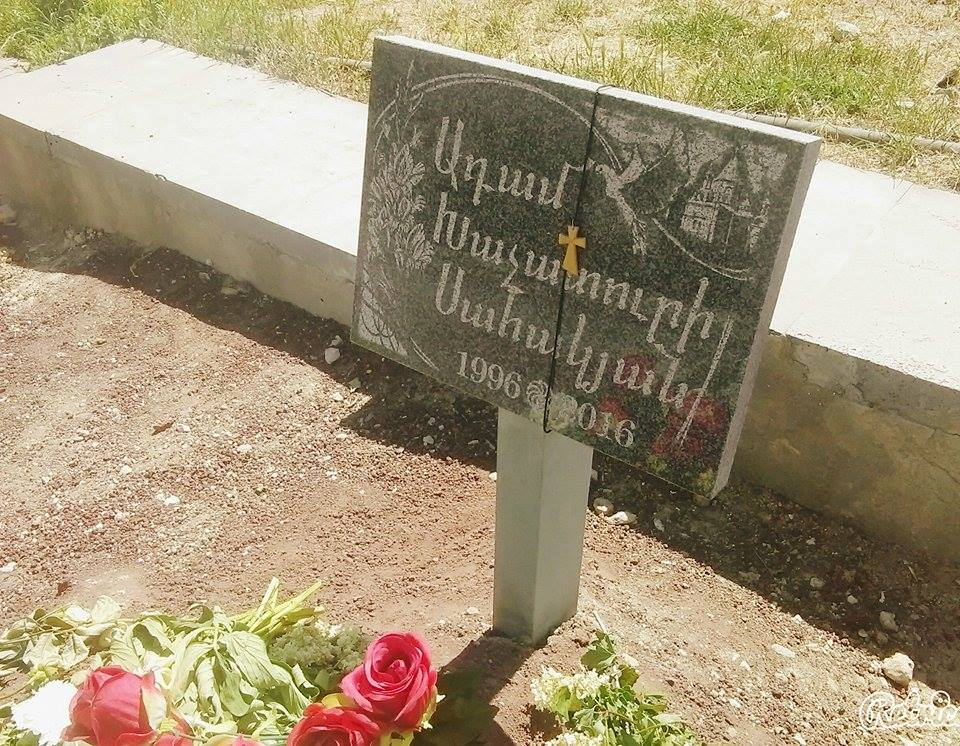
Adam Sahakyan plaque

On 13 April there was Sahakyan's funeral held at Yerablur Military Pantheon. The memorial ceremony was held at the Church of St. John the Baptist in Yerevan.

== Honors ==
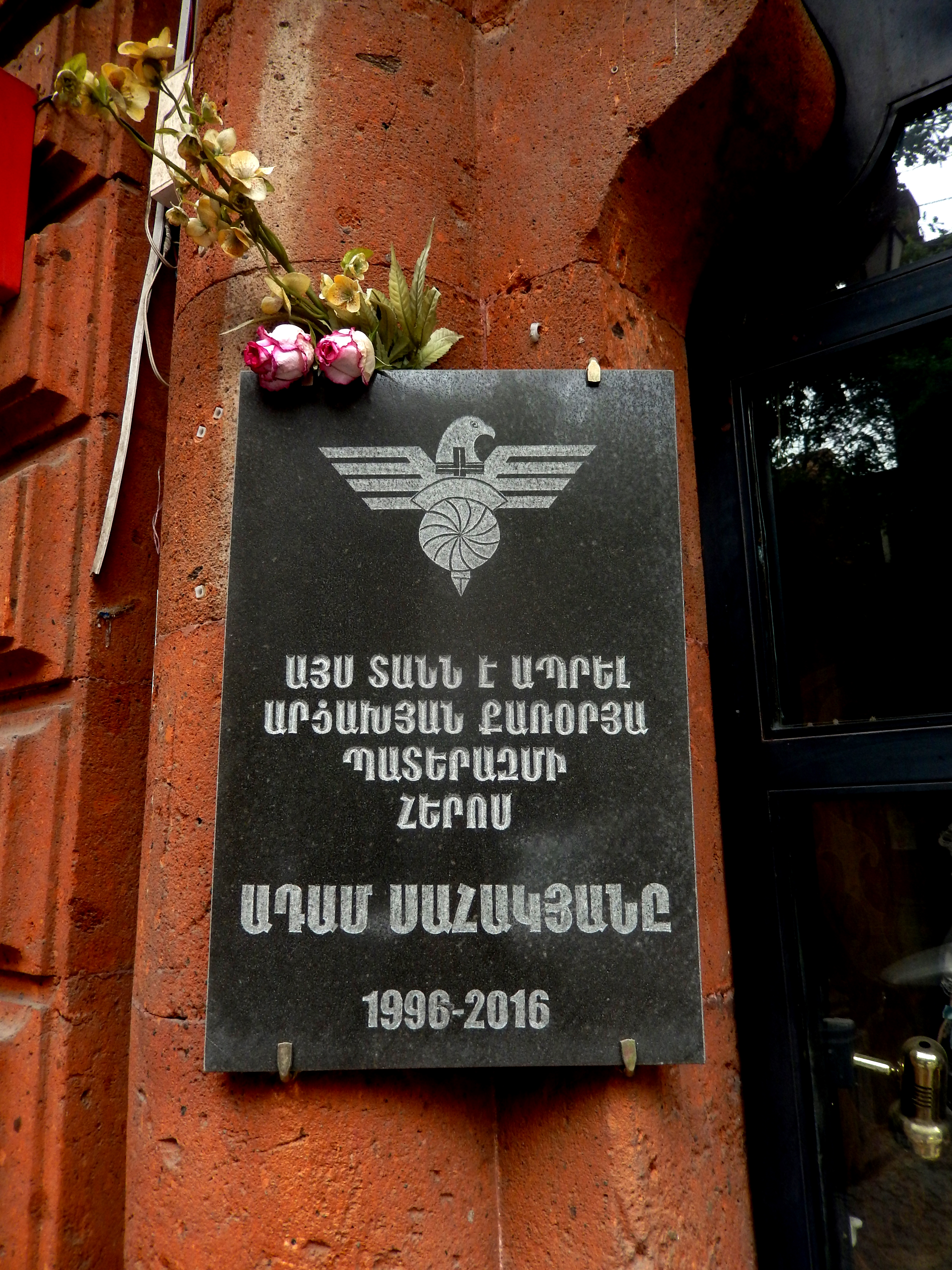
A memorial plaque dedicated to Adam Sahakyan on Abovyan Street in Yerevan

On 10 April 2016 Sahakyan was awarded the Military Merit Medal by the Nagorno-Kharabakh Republic State by decree of the NKR President Bako Sahakyan.

On 28 May 2016 Sahakyan was awarded by the Republic of Armenia State Medal of Valor by decree of the RA President Serzh Sargsyan.

He was also the 25th "Hero of Artsakh" awardee.
