= Orders, decorations, and medals of the Republic of Artsakh =

Orders, decorations, and medals of the Republic of Artsakh were awards bestowed upon citizens of the breakaway Republic of Artsakh (also known as the Nagorno-Karabakh Republic or NKR) until its dissolution in 2024. The highest award of the republic was the title Hero of Artsakh. The state awards of Artsakh are based on the Orders, decorations, and medals of Armenia.

== Orders ==
Name	Description	Image
Order of the Golden Eagle	The Order of the Golden Eagle was awarded to individuals who had been awarded the title of Hero of Artsakh.	
Order of the Combat Cross	This order of the first and second degrees was awarded to soldiers and officers of the Artsakh Defense Army for exceptional bravery and courage demonstrated in the defense of the motherland.	
Order of Grigor Lusavorich	This order was awarded for exceptional merits in improving the welfare of Artsakh.	
Order of Mesrop Mashtots	The Order of Mesrop Mashtots was awarded for outstanding achievements in the fields of economics, science, culture, and healthcare, which contributed to the progress of the nation's life and the prosperity of Artsakh.	

== Medals ==
Name	Description	Image
Medal "For Courage"	The medal was awarded to enlisted personnel, command personnel, and leadership of the Artsakh Defense Army for personal courage and bravery demonstrated in combat and military operations, while defending the inviolability of state borders, and in the fight against saboteurs, spies, and other enemies of the republic. This medal was also awarded to individuals outside the Defense Army who demonstrated skill, enterprise, and courage, contributed to the success of military operations at the front, ensured the safety of the republic's population, and endangered the lives and health of people, even at the risk of their own lives.	
Medal "For Military Merit"	The Medal "For Military Merit" was awarded to members of the Artsakh Defense Army, the police, the National Security Service, and individuals who contributed to the successful completion of combat missions, as well as for increasing the combat readiness of troops and courage demonstrated in defending borders.	
Medal "For the Liberation of Shusha"	The medal "For the Liberation of Shusha" was awarded to those servicemen of the Armed Forces, police and the National Security Service who were directly involved in the liberation of Shusha and other settlements liberated during this operation, as well as the organizers and leaders of the Shusha operation .	
Medal "Mkhitar Gosh"	This medal was awarded for outstanding state and socio-political activities.	
Medal “Vachagan Barepasht”	The Vachagan Barepasht medal was awarded for creative achievements in the fields of culture, literature, humanities, art, healthcare, and for charitable activities for the benefit of Artsakh.	
Medal “Anania Shirakatsi”	The Anania Shirakatsi medal was awarded to architects, scientists, and inventors from all sectors of the economy .	
Medal of Gratitude	The medal was awarded to individuals, organizations, and groups that made a significant contribution to the restoration and development of the national economy, science, culture, and social sphere of Artsakh and contributed to the protection and international recognition of Artsakh.	

== Honorary titles ==
- Honored Scientist of Artsakh
- Honored Teacher of Artsakh
- Honored Journalist of Artsakh
- Honored Cultural Figure of Artsakh
- Honored Artist of Artsakh
- Honored Artist of Artsakh
- People's Artist of Artsakh
- Honored Artist of Artsakh
- People's Artist of Artsakh
- Honored Architect of Artsakh
- Honored Doctor of Artsakh
- Honored Lawyer of Artsakh
- Honored figure of physical education and sports of Artsakh

== See also ==
- Orders, decorations, and medals of Armenia
