= Sergey Shakaryan =

Artsakhian Colonel (1974–2020)

- Սերգեյ Շաքարյան
- Born: 9 December 1974; Aygestan, Hadrut Province, Nagorno-Karabakh Autonomous Oblast
- Died: 1 November 2020 (aged 45); Martuni, Nagorno-Karabakh
- Military career
- Allegiance: Republic of Artsakh
- Branch: Artsakh Defense Army
- Rank: Colonel
- Conflicts: 2020 Nagorno-Karabakh conflict
- Awards: Hero of Artsakh (2020)

Sergey Slavik Shakaryan (born 9 December, 1974 in Aygestan, Hadrut Province, Nagorno-Karabakh Autonomous Oblast) (Armenian: Սերգեյ Սլավիկի Շաքարյան) was an Artsakhian military Colonel of the Artsakh Defense Army. He was the recipient of the Hero of Artsakh military award and one of the commanders of the 2020 Nagorno-Karabakh conflict. He was killed in Martuni, Nagorno-Karabakh, during the Second Nagorno-Karabakh War.

== Biography ==
He studied at the secondary school named after M. Manvelyan lived in the city of Hadrut, then continued his education at the Stepanakert Agricultural Institute. However, he left his studies incomplete and returned to Hadrut to volunteer to participate in the First Karabakh War at the age of 17. During the war, he served as head of a tank crew. He fought with his father, who was blown up by a mine in 1993.

On 4 October 2020, during the 2020 Nagorno-Karabakh conflict, he was awarded by the President of Artsakh, Arayik Harutyunyan, the highest title of "Hero of Artsakh". Colonel Shakaryan died on 1 November 2020 during the fighting in Artsakh. He was an only child and was married with two sons and a daughter.
