= David Grigoryan =

David Grigoryan may refer to:

- David Grigoryan (footballer, born 1982), Armenian football defender
- David G. Grigoryan, Armenian football midfielder
- David Grigoryan (serviceman), Armenian servicemen
