= Karen Jalavyan =

Colonel of the Artsakh Defence Army

- Կարեն Ջալավյան
- Born: 25 January 1971 (age 55)
- Military career
- Allegiance: Armenia; Artsakh
- Branch: (Republic of Artsakh) Artsakh Defence Army
- Rank: Colonel
- Nickname: Քյոխ (Kyokh)
- Commands: Yeghnikner military unit
- Conflicts: Second Nagorno-Karabakh War
- Awards: Hero of Artsakh; 2nd Degree Medal "For The Services Provided to the Motherland"; Order of the Combat Cross of the First Degree

Karen Aghasi Jalavyan (Armenian: Կարեն Աղասու Ջալավյան; born 25 January 1971), also known by his nom de guerre Kyokh (Armenian: Քյոխ), is an Armenian military officer, colonel of the Artsakh Defence Army, commander of the Yeghnikner military unit and recipient of the award Hero of Artsakh.

== Awards ==
On 21 January 2015, Karen Jalavyan was awarded the 2nd Degree Medal "For Services Provided to the Motherland" by President of Armenia Serzh Sargsyan.

A year later, on 21 September 2016, Jalavyan received another award, the Order of the Combat Cross of the First Degree.

During the Second Nagorno-Karabakh War, Jalavyan commanded the Yeghnikner military unit, which was stationed in the north of the Republic of Artsakh near the village of Tonashen. On 2 October 2020, Jalavyan received the highest title of Artsakh, Hero of Artsakh, from the president of the republic Arayik Harutyunyan. According to Harutyunyan, Jalavyan's detachment managed to "occupy several strategic heights and inflict heavy casualties on the Azerbaijani forces".
