= David Ghazaryan =

Armenian military personnel (1989–2020)

- David Ghazaryan
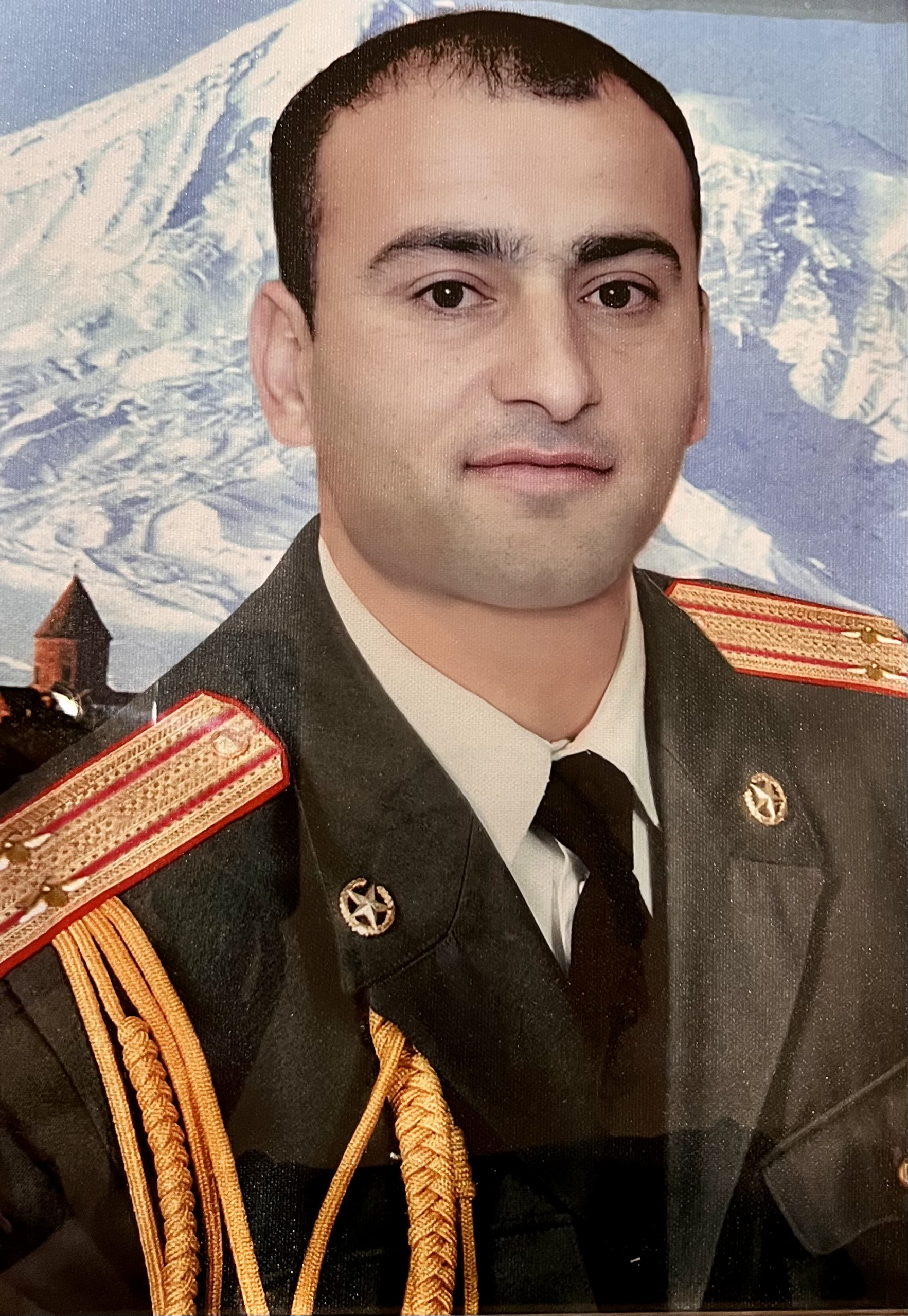
- Born: May 5, 1989; Vedi, Armenian SSR, Soviet Union
- Died: September–October 2020 (aged 31); Republic of Artsakh (de facto)
- Education: Vazgen Sargsyan Military University
- Military career
- Allegiance: Armenia; Artsakh
- Branch: Artsakh Defence Army
- Rank: Lieutenant-Colonel
- Conflicts: Four-Day War; Second Nagorno-Karabakh War
- Awards: Hero of Artsakh; Golden Eagle medal

David Ghazaryan (Armenian: Դավիթ Ղազարյան; 5 May 1989 – September–October 2020) was an Armenian Lieutenant-Colonel, who participated and fell during the Second Nagorno-Karabakh war. In 2020, he was posthumously awarded the military award of Hero of Artsakh.

== Awards and honours ==
A decree by Arayik Harutyunyan, the President of the Republic of Artsakh, awarded David Ghazaryan posthumously the title of Hero of Artsakh.

"For exceptional services rendered to the Artsakh Republic while defending and ensuring the security of the Motherland, as well as for bravery and personal courage, I have awarded David Ghazaryan, serviceman of the Defense Army, with the highest title of the "Hero of Artsakh" (posthumously), awarding him with the "Golden Eagle" order. — President of the Republic of Artsakh, Arayik Harutyunyan

According to the President, Ghazaryan fought by the principle of “not a step back” and performed a heroic deed.

== Personal life ==
Ghazaryan was married and had two children.
