= Robert Abajyan =

Armenian soldier (1996–2016)

- Born: 16 November 1996; Yerevan, Armenia
- Died: 2 April 2016 (aged 19); Martakert, Azerbaijan
- Burial place: Yerablur
- Military career
- Allegiance: Armenia; Republic of Artsakh
- Branch: Nagorno-Karabakh Defense Army
- Service years: 2014–2016
- Rank: Junior Sergeant
- Nicknames: Kyazh (Blondie); (Armenian: Կյաժ); The Blond of Monument
- Conflicts: Four-Day War †
- Awards: Hero of Artsakh; Golden Eagle medal

Robert Abajyan (Armenian: Ռոբերտ Աբաջյան; 16 November 1996 – 2 April 2016) was an Armenian junior sergeant in the Republic of Artsakh Defense Army. He was posthumously awarded the "Hero of Artsakh" which is the highest honorary title of the self-declared Republic of Artsakh.

Abajyan fought alone for several hours against special forces groups of the Azerbaijani Armed Forces during the Armenian–Azerbaijani clashes of 2016 in the northeast line of contact on the night of 1–2 April. He gestured as if to surrender, and then pulled out a grenade and blew up the approaching Azerbaijani soldiers with himself.

== Biography ==
=== Early life ===
Abajyan was born in 1996 in Yerevan. In 2003, he attended Yerevan's Basic School No. 147 in Kanaker-Zeytun District. He graduated in 2012 and attended Yerevan State Basic Medical College, which he graduated in 2014 with a degree in dental technology. He then attended Medical Institute named after Mother Teresa later same year.

=== Military service ===
Abajyan went to compulsory military service in 2014. Due to high military performance, he was promoted to junior sergeant.

==== Armenian–Azerbaijani clashes ====
On the night of 1–2 April 2016 along the northeastern part of the NKR-Azerbaijan contact line, units of the Azerbaijani Armed Forces carried out large-scale attacks against the Armenian side. After the use of artillery, groups of Azerbaijani forces commenced an infantry attack. Under the leadership of captain Armenak Urfanyan, a smaller number of Armenian border soldiers started to provide heavy resistance. After two failed attempts of penetration and a loss of a tank, Azerbaijani forces withdrew to their initial positions and resumed the artillery bombardments on the contact line. Captain Urfanyan and Yazidi-Armenian machine-gunner Kyaram Sloyan were soon killed.

After the death of the commander, Robert Abajyan, who had suffered a wound in his leg by that time, took it upon himself to proceed with the resistance. After the penetration of Azerbaijani forces inside the line, he brought his wounded comrade machine-gunner Andranik Zohrabyan into the trench cell, which was located at a distance of 30 meters (98 feet).

In the trench cell Abajyan contacted the battalion commander and provided valuable information on the operational situation. He informed about possible dangers to the commander of the group that hurried to aid. After Andranik Zohrabyan bled to death, Abajyan continued to fight alone from the cell against a large number of enemy forces. After spotting the approaching Azerbaijani soldiers, he attracted their attention by raising his hands and pretended to surrender, while secretly keeping an exposed hand grenade.

Allowing two Azerbaijani soldiers to approach, Abajyan blew himself up with a grenade. It's not clear if he could have killed or wounded any enemy soldier with his action. Having made that decision, he radioed in and said, "Mister Colonel, Mister Colonel, I want you to tell everyone that in this position my men have died, my brothers have died, there have been Turks on this soil. I am now dragging the [grenade] ring, I want you to tell everyone, anyone that gives up this position — their mother… (meaning a curse)(explosion)."

On 8 April, after a mutual agreement was reached in advance between both parties, the bodies of Abajyan and Zohrabyan were found as a result of body searching operations.

==== Funeral ====
On 11 April 2016, Abajyan was buried in the Yerablur Military Pantheon. Funeral ceremonies were held in front of St. John the Baptist Church in Yerevan.

==== Hero of Artsakh ====
Abajyan was posthumously awarded the highest Honorary Title "Hero of Artsakh" and the Order of the "Golden Eagle", "for exclusive bravery and courage shown during the defense of the NKR state border in the course of the large-scale military operations from 2 to 5 April". He became the 24th "Hero of Artsakh" awardee, as well as the youngest person ever to hold the title at 19 years old.
