= Menua Hovhannisyan =

Armenian serviceman and intelligence officer (1985–2020)

- Մենուա Հովհաննիսյան
- Born: December 22, 1985; Balashovsky District, Russian SFSR, USSR
- Died: October 5, 2020 (aged 34); Republic of Artsakh (de facto)
- Burial place: Yerablur Military Pantheon
- Military career
- Allegiance: Artsakh; Armenia
- Branch: Artsakh Defence Army; Armed Forces of Armenia
- Conflicts: Four-Day War; Second Nagorno-Karabakh War
- Awards: Hero of Artsakh; Golden Eagle medal

Menua Hovhannisyan (Armenian: Մենուա Հովհաննիսյան; 22 December 1985 – 5 October 2020) was an Armenian serviceman and intelligence officer in the Artsakh Defense Army, participant of the Four-Day War and Second Nagorno-Karabakh war. In 2020 he was posthumously awarded the Hero of Artsakh military award, which is the highest honorary title of the self-proclaimed Republic of Artsakh.

During the 2020 Nagorno-Karabakh war, he carried out a special operation, as a result of which he brought 18-20 year old guys out of the blockade in Madagiz, "not allowing anyone to lose a single hair on their heads".

== Biography ==
=== Military service ===
Menua Hovhannisyan was a vice-president of the Union of Young Yerkrapahs, who had spent half a year training with volunteers since joining the Yerkrapah Volunteer Union.

==== Four-Day War ====
Menua Hovhannisyan served as an intelligence officer in one of the military units of the Armed Forces of Armenia. During the Four-Day War he volunteered and left to the front, particularly to Talish.

==== 2020 Nagorno-Karabakh war ====
Hovhannisyan went to the front as a volunteer during Second Nagorno-Karabakh War. He died in early October 2020 during a special operation, when he was deployed as a special operation’s unit commander.

==== Funeral ====
On 31 December 2020, Hovhannisyan was buried in the Yerablur Military Pantheon.

== Awards ==
By the decree of the President of the Republic of Artsakh Arayik Harutyunyan, Menua Hovhannisyan has been posthumously awarded the title of Hero of Artsakh.

Menua came to Artsakh together with his friends in pursuit of his big dream — to defend his native land and ensure its persistent existence. I met him incidentally on the front. Our communication was short, just one day, but very impressive. His bold demeanor, bright and radiant thoughts immediately caught my attention. We even managed to talk about what to do after the victory. But our plans remained unfulfilled... The Homeland recognizes his feat on the battlefield. According to my decree, Menua Hovhannisyan was conferred the highest title of the "Hero of Artsakh".

— President of the Republic of Artsakh, Arayik Harutyunyan

== Family ==
Hovhannisyan was the son of Karin Tonoyan, Director of "Hay Aspet - Military Patriotic Education" Fund, and TV program host. He had 2 children. The eldest son is named Sardur and the daughter Arina.
