= Armenak Urfanyan =

Armenian military personnel

- Արմենակ Մերսի Ուրֆանյան
- Born: January 28, 1990; Yerevan, Soviet Armenia, USSR
- Died: April 2, 2016 (aged 26) near Martakert, Republic of Artsakh (de facto)
- Burial place: Yerablur Military Pantheon
- Military career
- Allegiance: Armenia; Artsakh
- Branch: Armed Forces of Armenia; Artsakh Defence Army
- Service years: 2007–2016
- Rank: Captain
- Conflicts: Four-Day War †
- Awards: Hero of Artsakh; 1st Class Combat Cross Medal (Armenia); Medal for Combat Service (Artsakh)

Armenak Urfanyan (Armenian: Արմենակ Ուրֆանյան; 28 January 1990 – 2 April 2016) was an Armenian serviceman in the Artsakh Defense Army, captain of the Armed Forces of Armenia, participant of the Four-Day War. In 2020 he was posthumously awarded the Hero of Artsakh military award, which is the highest honorary title of the self-proclaimed Republic of Artsakh.

During the Four-Day War, Urafanyan realized that it was impossible to resist the Azerbaijani forces, exceeding in number and military equipment, he decided to fight by himself, commanding the soldiers to retreat. Kyaram Sloyan, Robert Abajyan and Andranik Zohrabyan fell with their commander and others were wounded.

== Biography ==
Armenak Urfanyan was born on 28 January 1990 in Yerevan. In 1992 he moved to Russia with his family. He was the youngest son in the family. As a child, he made up his mind to become a military. He began practicing a sport. He was a triple champion of Taekwondo.

=== Military service ===
After returning from Russia, Urfanyan was admitted to the Military Institute of the RA Ministry of Defense. Urfanyan's fellow soldiers stated that he completely devoted himself to the military service, servicemen and his fatherland. After studying, he received the rank of lieutenant officer. At the age of 26 he received the military rank of captain and was appointed platoon commander on the front line.

==== Four-Day War ====
Overnight 1–2 April 2016, Urfanyan and his troops came under enemy fire in the area of a military post located near Martakert. Captain Urfanyan, together with his fellow soldiers fought back against the Azerbaijani forces for hours. During the battle, Urfanyan destroyed multiple attacking enemy fighters and one engineering-reconnaissance armored vehicle. He was killed in action from tank fire.

==== Funeral ====
On 6 April 2016, Armenak Urfanyan was buried in the Yerablur Military Pantheon.

== Memorials ==
- A street in Artsakh’s Martakert town has been named after Armenak Urfanyan.
- On 30 June 2016, a monument was erected by Yerkrapah Volunteer Union in the position where Armenak Urfanyan, Robert Abajyan, Kyaram Sloyan and Andranik Zohrabyan were killed during the Four-Day War.
- The Homeland Defender’s Rehabilitation Center in Yerevan opened a classroom named after Armenak Urfanyan.
- The Fund named after Armenak Urfanyan was launched by his mother in memory of all fallen soldiers of the Four-Day War.

== Awards ==
- On 6 April 2016, by the decree of the President of the Republic of Artsakh Bako Sahakyan, Armenak Urfanyan was posthumously awarded the "Combat Service" medal for his courage in defending the state border of the Republic of Artsakh.
- On 28 May 2016, Armenak Urfanyan was posthumously awarded the "Combat Cross" Order of the 1st degree by the decree of the President of the Republic of Armenia Serzh Sargsyan.
- On 29 August 2020, by the decree of the President of the Republic of Artsakh Arayik Harutyunyan, Armenak Urfanyan has been posthumously awarded the title of Hero of Artsakh.

There have been many discussions about the selfless and patriotic behavior of Armenak Urfanyan before. I think that on the Day of the Republic of Artsakh, the best decision would be to appreciate his heroic image.

— President of the Republic of Artsakh, Arayik Harutyunyan

== Literature ==
- Arzumanyan, Vova (8 September 2020). Բանակի տղան [The Army’s Son] (in Armenian). Republic of Artsakh.
