= Albert Hovhannisyan =

Armenian Army junior sergeant (2001–2020)

- Ալբերտ Արտակի Հովհաննիսյան
- Born: September 15, 2001; Yerevan, Armenia
- Died: October 8, 2020 (aged 19); Republic of Artsakh (de facto)
- Burial place: Yerablur Military Pantheon
- Education: Russian-Armenian University
- Military career
- Allegiance: Armenia; Artsakh
- Branch: Armed Forces of Armenia; Artsakh Defence Army
- Service years: 2020
- Rank: Junior sergeant
- Unit: 4th Artillery of the 2nd Artillery Battery of the D-30 Artillery Division of the N Military Unit of the Defense Army of Artsakh
- Known for: Heroism in war
- Conflicts: Second Nagorno-Karabakh War
- Awards: Medal for Courage (Artsakh); Order of the Golden Eagle (Artsakh)

Albert Hovhannisyan (Armenian: Ալբերտ Հովհաննիսյան; 15 September 2001 – 8 October 2020) was a junior sergeant of the Armenian Army who participated in the Second Nagorno-Karabakh War and died amid the hostilities.

A photo released by the Armenian Ministry of Defense of him firing artillery when fighting on the frontlines of the Artsakhian side quickly became an iconic image used by hundreds of media outlets around the world when covering the 2020 hostilities in Nagorno-Karabakh. In 2021, he was posthumously awarded the Hero of Artsakh military award, which is the highest honorary title of the self-proclaimed Republic of Artsakh.

== Biography ==
Hovhannisyan was born on September 15, 2001, in Yerevan, Armenia, and was the only son of his family.

In 2004-2007, Hovhannisyan studied in the kindergarten No. 5 of Kanaker-Zeytun community.

In 2006-2012, he attended Arabkir sports school and practiced Docando karate. He was awarded black and red belts.

In 2007-2012, he studied at the basic school N59 after Hakob Paronyan in Yerevan. In 2012-2015 he studied at "Quantum" college. In 2015-2016, he studied at school No. 128 after Leo Tolstoy and in 2016-2018, at the high school after Heratsi.

In 2018, in parallel with high school, he studied in the preparatory course of the Armenian-Russian University.

In 2019, Albert Hovhannisyan entered the Faculty of Political Science of the same university.

On January 13, 2020, Albert Hovhannisyan was conscripted into the Armenian army and became a junior sergeant. Albert Hovhannisyan was the Commander of the 4th Artillery of the 2nd Artillery Battery of the D-30 Artillery Division of the N Military Unit of the Defense Army.

Albert Hovhannisyan was awarded two medals: a specialist of the 3rd class artillery of the Ministry of Defense and an artilleryman.

Albert Hovhannisyan died in the Armenian-Azerbaijani war on October 8, 2020, and was buried in Yerablur military pantheon.

On October 8, 2020, Artsakh President Arayik Harutyunyan posthumously awarded the "For Courage" medal to the late Albert Hovhannisyan.

After the death of his son, his father, Artak Hovhannisyan, donated his personal car to the Armenian Army.

On December 22, 2020, "HayPost" CJSC issues a donation voucher worth 5000 AMD, which shows Albert Hovhannisyan. Proceeds from the sale go to projects implemented through the Soldiers' Insurance Fund.

Zoz Hovsepyan wrote a book entitled "Albert, the god of artillery", which tells the story of Albert Hovhannisyan, a hero who died in the war. The other heroes of the novel are: Jor, Rafon, Alik, the Holy Father, the commander and his beloved. The operations have been going on since the morning of September 27. The memoirs then refer to the remarkable facts of Albert's life, through which the reader discovers Albert as a child, a teenager, a child, a soldier, and a believer in God.

In October 2021, Albert Hovhannisyan was posthumously awarded Hero of Artsakh highest honorary title, while his Order of the Golden Eagle was given to his father, Artak Hovhannisyan.

== Literature ==
- Hovsepyan, Zoz (15 September 2021). Ալբերտը՝ հրետանու աստված [Albert, the god of artillery] (in Armenian).
