= Samvel Karapetyan (general) =

Armenian military commander

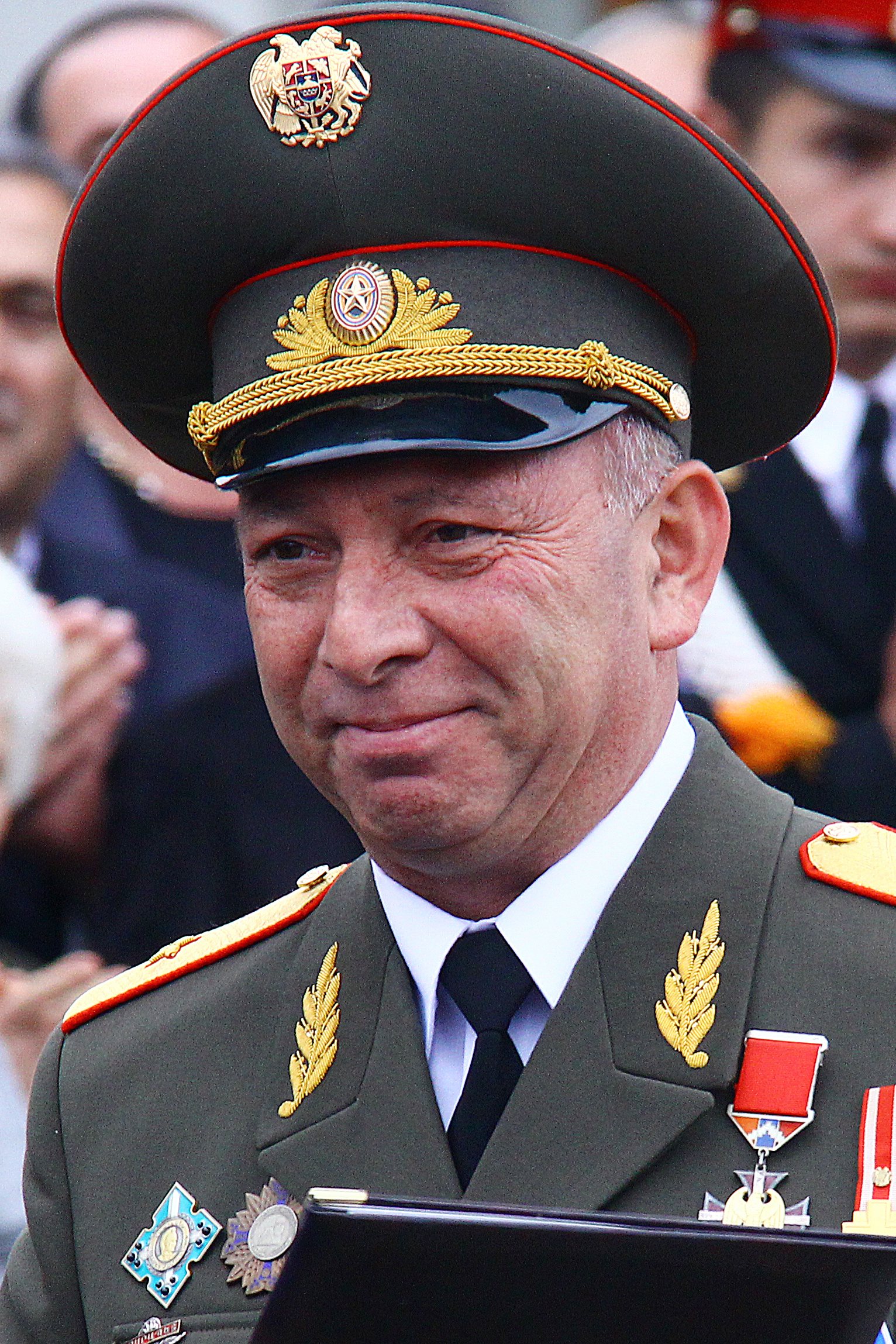

Personal details
- Born: September 11, 1962 (age 63) Stepanakert, Nagorno-Karabakh Autonomous Oblast, USSR
- Awards: Hero of Artsakh

Military service
- Allegiance: Republic of Artsakh
- Branch/service: Artsakh Defense Army
- Years of service: 1991–2019
- Rank: Major General
- Battles/wars: First Nagorno-Karabakh War; Four-Day War

Samvel Jamili Karapetyan (Armenian: Սամվել Ջամիլի Կարապետյան; born September 11, 1962), also known by his nom de guerre Oganovsky, is an Armenian military commander from the Republic of Artsakh who participated in the First Nagorno-Karabakh War. He held the rank of major general in the Artsakh Defense Army prior to its disbandment in 2024, and has received the award Hero of Artsakh.

== Biography ==
Karapetyan was born on September 11, 1962, in Stepanakert in the Nagorno-Karabakh Autonomous Oblast, then a part of the Azerbaijan SSR. He served in the Soviet military from 1981 to 1983. He participated in the Karabakh movement to unite Nagorno-Karabakh with Armenia and in the defense of Armenian settlements from 1988.

During the First Nagorno-Karabakh War, Karapetyan became commander of the Central Defense District (a regiment based in Stepanakert) of the Nagorno-Karabakh Republic Defense Army. His unit achieved a number of prominent victories during the war. Karapetyan was wounded twice during the war: once during the Battle of Kalbajar and again more severely near Horadiz.

Karapetyan continued to command the Central Defense District after the war until 2000, when he was appointed deputy commander of the Artsakh Defense Army. He held this position until 2019, when he resigned.

In 2019, BBC's Russian-language service published an article revealing that Armenian investigators believe that Karapetyan commanded a group of soldiers from Nagorno-Karabakh that fired on protestors on March 1, 2008, during the 2008 Armenian presidential election protests, resulting in the deaths of 10 people. The article was based on Karapetyan's questioning by the Special Investigative Service of Armenia in relation to the March 1 case, a copy of which the BBC acquired. During the questioning, Karapetyan confirmed that he commanded a unit brought to Yerevan from Nagorno-Karabakh during the March 1 events but denied that there was any order to shoot people. After the contents of the questioning were made public, Karapetyan confirmed the authenticity of the document, reiterated that there was no order to fire upon protestors and declared his readiness to repeat what he said during his interrogation at the trial of ex-president Robert Kocharyan.

On May 10, 2022, Karapetyan was arrested in Stepanakert in relation to a shooting in Renaissance Square. He was soon released after signing an affidavit not to leave the country and charged with hooliganism and illegal possession of a weapon.
