= Alen Margaryan =

Armenian soldier (1999–2020)

- Ալեն Լևոնի Մարգարյան
- Born: 11 February 1999; Yerevan, Armenia
- Died: 30 September 2020 (aged 21); Madagiz, Martakert Province, Republic of Artsakh (de facto)
- Burial place: Yerablur Military Pantheon
- Education: Armenian State Pedagogical University
- Military career
- Allegiance: Artsakh
- Branch: Artsakh Defence Army
- Conflicts: Second Nagorno-Karabakh War
- Awards: Hero of Artsakh; Golden Eagle medal

Alen Margaryan (Armenian: Ալեն Մարգարյան; 11 February 1999 – 30 September 2020) was an Armenian serviceman in the Artsakh Defense Army, participant of the Second Nagorno-Karabakh war. In 2021 he was posthumously awarded the Hero of Artsakh military award, which is the highest honorary title of the Republic of Artsakh.

== Biography ==
Margaryan was born on 11 February 1999. In 2005–2013 he studied at the basic school N 27 after Derenik Demirchyan. After graduating from the basic school, he entered high school N 29 after Andranik Margaryan. He received his bachelor's degree in the Armenian State Pedagogical University, where he studied filmmaking. Margaryan was a teacher at the Tumo Center for Creative Technologies and aimed to become Minister of Education. He was admitted to Boston University, but before continuing his studies there, he decided "to pay the debt to the homeland".

=== Military service ===
==== Second Nagorno-Karabakh War ====
On 30 September 2020, during the Second Nagorno-Karabakh War, the soldiers of the Artsakh Defense Army were informed that the servicemen in the positions must be provided with weapons and food. Margaryan was one of those who rushed to help the soldiers. On the same day, he was killed by a drone strike.

==== Funeral ====
On 11 October 2020, Margaryan was buried in the Yerablur Military Pantheon.

== Awards and honors ==
By the decree of the President of the Republic of Artsakh Arayik Harutyunyan, Alen Margaryan has been posthumously awarded the title of Hero of Artsakh.

My homage to the bright memory of all our heroes who sacrificed their lives for the Motherland. The message left to us by Alen and his martyred friends is to do the maximum to strengthen our Homeland.. And his heroic deeds on the battlefield and his conscious decision to keep his homeland at the cost of his life can only be considered an exceptional manifestation of patriotism.

— President of the Republic of Artsakh, Arayik Harutyunyan

The auditorium 215 of the Faculty of Culture (ASPY) was named after Alen Margaryan. Dean of the Faculty of Culture Gevorg Tadevosyan hoped that naming the auditorium after Alen Margaryan "would serve as a message of patriotism for his friends and the following generations".

== Publications ==
On 8 May 2021, took place the presentation of the book about Alen Margaryan entitled "Our Alen" (Armenian: Բոլորիս Ալենը), which was initiated by his friends and relatives.
