= Suren Barseghyan =

Armenian military personnel

- Սուրեն Բարսեղյան
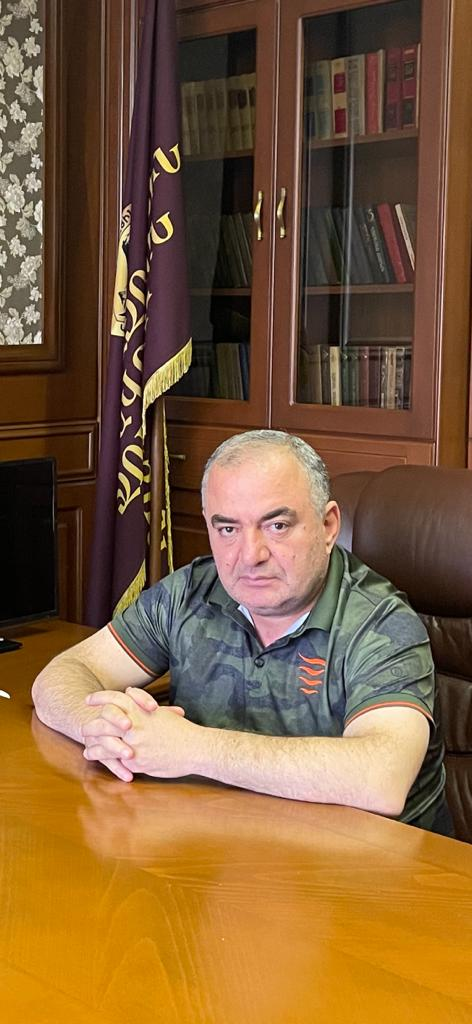
- Military career
- Allegiance: Republic of Artsakh
- Branch: Artsakh Defence Army
- Conflicts: 2020 Nagorno-Karabakh war
- Awards: Hero of Artsakh; Golden Eagle medal

Suren Barseghyan (Armenian: Սուրեն Բարսեղյան) is an Armenian military personnel, participant of the Second Nagorno-Karabakh war, commander of the World Volunteer Detachment. In 2020 he was awarded the Hero of Artsakh military award, which is the highest honorary title of the self-proclaimed Republic of Artsakh.

== The Battle Path ==
In June and July 1989, the "Malatia" volunteer detachment led by Vahan Zatikyan was formed in the Shahumyan region of Yerevan. Suren Barseghyan joined the "Malatia" detachment in 1989. From September to December 1989, he took part in the self-defense of Kornidzor, Aris and Tegh villages of Goris region, in January 1990 in the self-defense of Yeraskhavan, in the Jermuk border (Karvachar) zone, from August to September, to the self-defense of Voskepar, Kirants, Baghanis villages of Noyemberyan region.

From February to April 1991, he participated in the self-defense of Getashen.

The commander of the "Malatia" detachment Vahan Zatikyan was elected chairman of the regional executive committee at the request of the population of the Shahumyan district of Yerevan. Hakob Hakobyan assumed the post of commander. Suren Barseghyan was appointed Deputy Commander of the "Malatia" detachment for military affairs.

From August to September 1991, he participated in the self-defense of Hadrut, in October and November 1991, in the self-defense of the villages of Ijevan district, in February 1992, in the liberation of the villages of Malibeyli, Gushchular, Karadaglu, Khojalu, in May and June 1992, in the self-defense of the villages of Nakhijevanik, Perjamal of Askeran district, in August–September 1992-in the self-defense of the villages of Khramort of Askeran district, in November and December 1992, in the liberation of Lachinsky district, in March and April 1993, in the liberation of Karvachar, from August 1993 to March 1994, the Malatia detachment as part of the 5th Brigade participated in the liberation of Goradiz, Martakert districts and villages.

After Hakob Hakobyan was wounded in Martakert, Suren Barseghyan assumed the duties of the detachment commander.

In April and May 2016, the deputy commander of the motorized rifle battalion of the nth military unit of the RA Defense Ministry, the commander of volunteers, was on the front line of the NKR Autonomous Republic.

During the 44-day war of 2020, from September 29 until the end of the war, while being part of the Hadrut defense regiment, he participated in military operations.

== Military activities ==
From April 5 to July 25, 1994, he was the commander of the three-month service of the Shahumyan district of the Aghdam district.

In May and June 1997, he was the deputy commander of the regiment in the territory of Goradiz of the 114th defense zone.

1994-1998-Chairman of the branch of the Union of Volunteers "Yerkrapah" Malatia-Sebastia.

1998-2004-Deputy Chairman of the Yerevan city branch of the Union of Volunteers "Yerkrapah".

1998-2004-Member of the Board of the Union of Volunteers "Yerkrapah", lieutenant colonel of the reserve.

In 2016 he founded the public organization "Volunteer militia units".

Since April 2, 2016, based on the situation in the NKR border regions, in the border regions of the NKR, he headed the "Militia volunteer units". From May 4 to May 25 of the same year he was at the disposal of the Command of the NKR Defense Army on the front line.

From April 2019 to January 2020 he was the Deputy Chairman of the Board of the RA Union of Volunteers "Yerkrapah".

On September 29, 2020, from September 29 to October 30, 2020, by the orders of the Ministry of Defense of the Republic of Armenia and the Artsakh Defense Army Participated in the defense of Karakhambeli (Fizuli) with the second battalion in the Hadrut Defense Regiment, performed combat tasks and necessary actions. The battle line was kept intact throughout those areas. They left the combat position after a special command. He was injured on October 28.

== Awards and honours ==
On September 21, 1996, he was awarded the Medal "For Combat Service" by the Decree of the President of the Republic of Armenia.

On November 22, 1997, he was awarded the Medal of "Marshal Baghramyan" by the Decree of the RA Defense Minister.

On May 8, 2001, he was awarded the "Maternal Gratitude" Medal by the NKR.

On May 14, 2002, he was awarded the Medal of "Courage" by the President of the NKR.

On May 8, 2003, he was awarded "Sparapet Vazgen Sargsyan" Medal by the Decree of the RA Defense Minister.

On June 21, 2003, the President of the NKR awarded him the "Battle Cross" Order of 1st degree.

On June 11, 2007, he wasawarded the "Garegin Nzhdeh'' Medal of the Ministry of Defense of the Republic of Armenia.

On July 1, 2016, he was awarded the "Andranik Ozanyan" Medal of the Ministry of Defense of the Republic of Armenia.

He was twice awarded with a nominal weapon by the Prime Minister of the Republic of Armenia. The NKR Defense Army also awarded him with personal weapons.

By the Decree of the President of the Republic of Armenia dated January 23, 2017 he was awarded the Medal of "Courage".

On 29 October 2020, by the decree of the President of the Republic of Artsakh Arayik Harutyunyan, Suren Barseghyan has been awarded the title of Hero of Artsakh.

In compliance with my decision, for exclusive services shown to the Republic of Artsakh in ensuring the defense and security of the Motherland, for courage and personal bravery Suren Barseghyan will be conferred the highest title of the "Hero of Artsakh". Suren Barseghyan has been in combat positions with a volunteer detachment since September 29. The detachment formed in Yerevan, led by the commander, authored many heroic military operations, pushing back the enemy, and inflicting numerous losses. Most of the fellows-in-arms are presented to awards as well. Honor and glory to all our defenders of the Motherland!

— President of the Republic of Artsakh, Arayik Harutyunyan
