= Aygestan, Askeran =

Aygestan / Ballyja Այգեստան / Ballıca
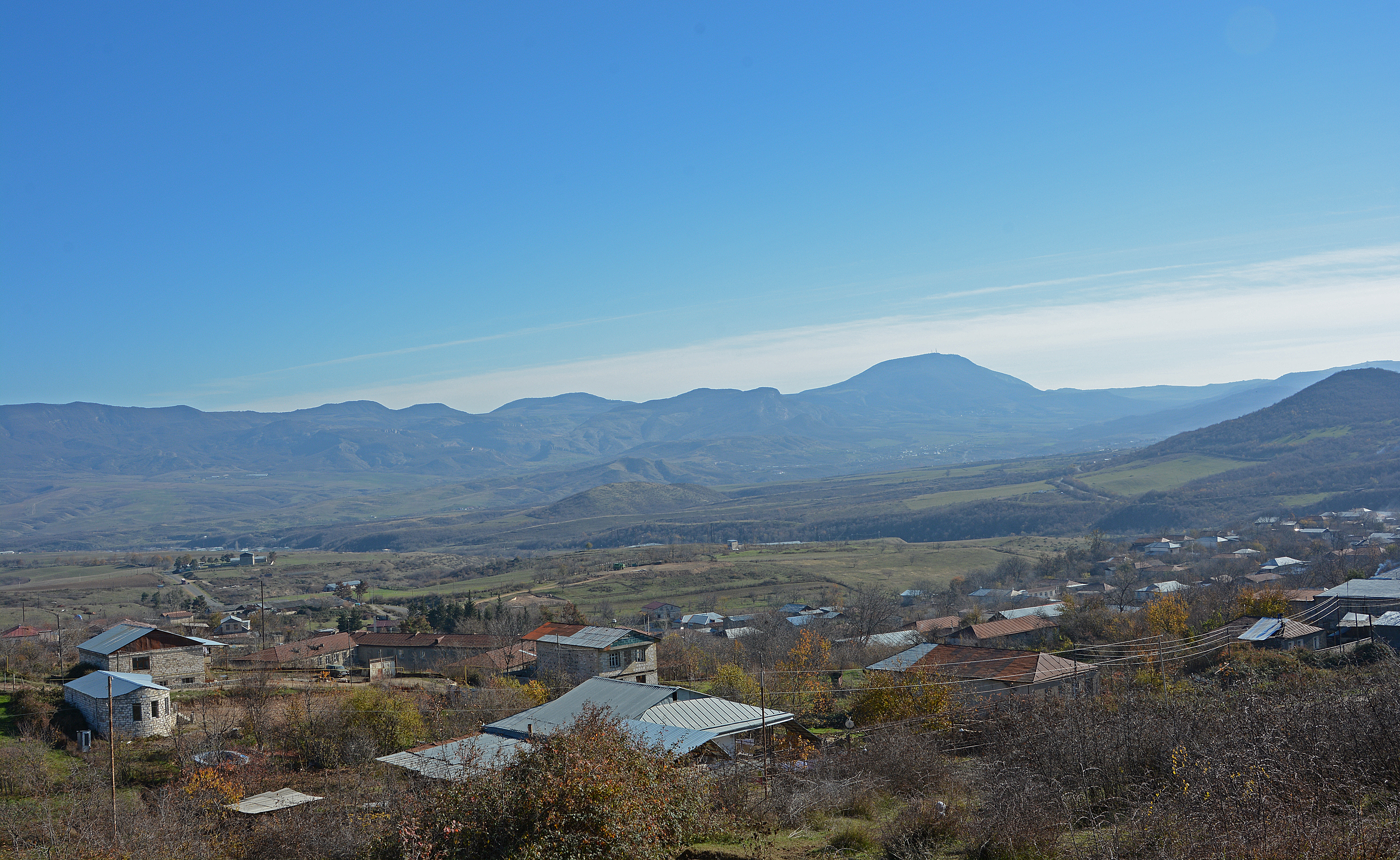

- Location within Azerbaijan Location within Karabakh Economic Region
- Coordinates: 39°51′57″N 46°43′24″E
- Country: Azerbaijan
  - District: Khojaly

Area
  - Total: 2,283.46 km^{2} (881.65 sq mi)
- Elevation: 1,084 m (3,556 ft)

Population (2025)
  - Total: 1,054
- Time zone: UTC+4 (AZT)

Aygestan (Armenian: Այգեստան) or Ballyja (Armenian: Բալուջա, romanized: Baluja; Azerbaijani: Ballıca) is a village in the Khojaly District of Azerbaijan, in the region of Nagorno-Karabakh. Until 2023 it was controlled by the breakaway Republic of Artsakh. The village had an ethnic Armenian-majority population until the expulsion of the Armenian population of Nagorno-Karabakh by Azerbaijan following the 2023 Azerbaijani offensive in Nagorno-Karabakh.

== History ==
The modern village was founded in the 17th century. During the Soviet period, the village was part of the Askeran District of the Nagorno-Karabakh Autonomous Oblast.

== Historical heritage sites ==
Historical heritage sites in and around the village include tombs from the 2nd–1st centuries BCE, a 12th/13th-century village, the 12th/13th-century Tamtsi Church (Armenian: Թամցի եկեղեցի), the 12th/13th-century shrine of Prshni Nahatak (Armenian: Փռշնի Նահատակ), a 13th-century khachkar, a cemetery from between the 17th and 19th centuries, and the church of Surb Astvatsatsin (Armenian: Սուրբ Աստվածածին, lit. 'Holy Mother of God') built in 1850.

== Economy and culture ==
The population is mainly engaged in agriculture and animal husbandry, as well as in different state institutions. As of 2015, the village has a municipal building, a house of culture, a secondary school, a kindergarten, and a medical centre. The village is home to the Artsakh Brandy Company.

== Demographics ==
The village had 1,091 inhabitants in 2005, and 1,084 inhabitants in 2015.

As of December 2025, 237 Azerbaijani families, totaling 1054 individuals, have been resettled in the Ballyja village by Azerbaijan.

== Gallery ==
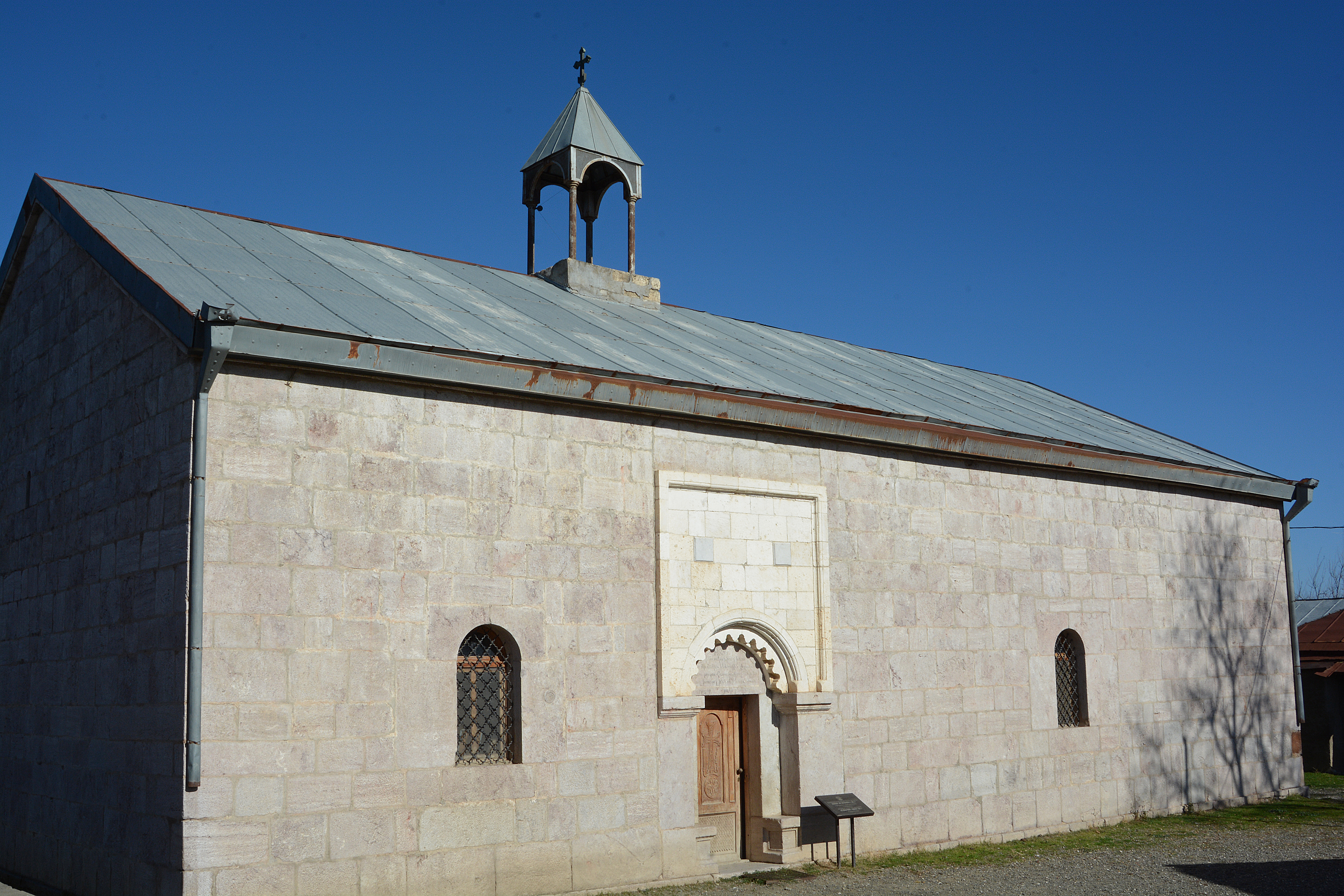
St. Astvatsatsin Church

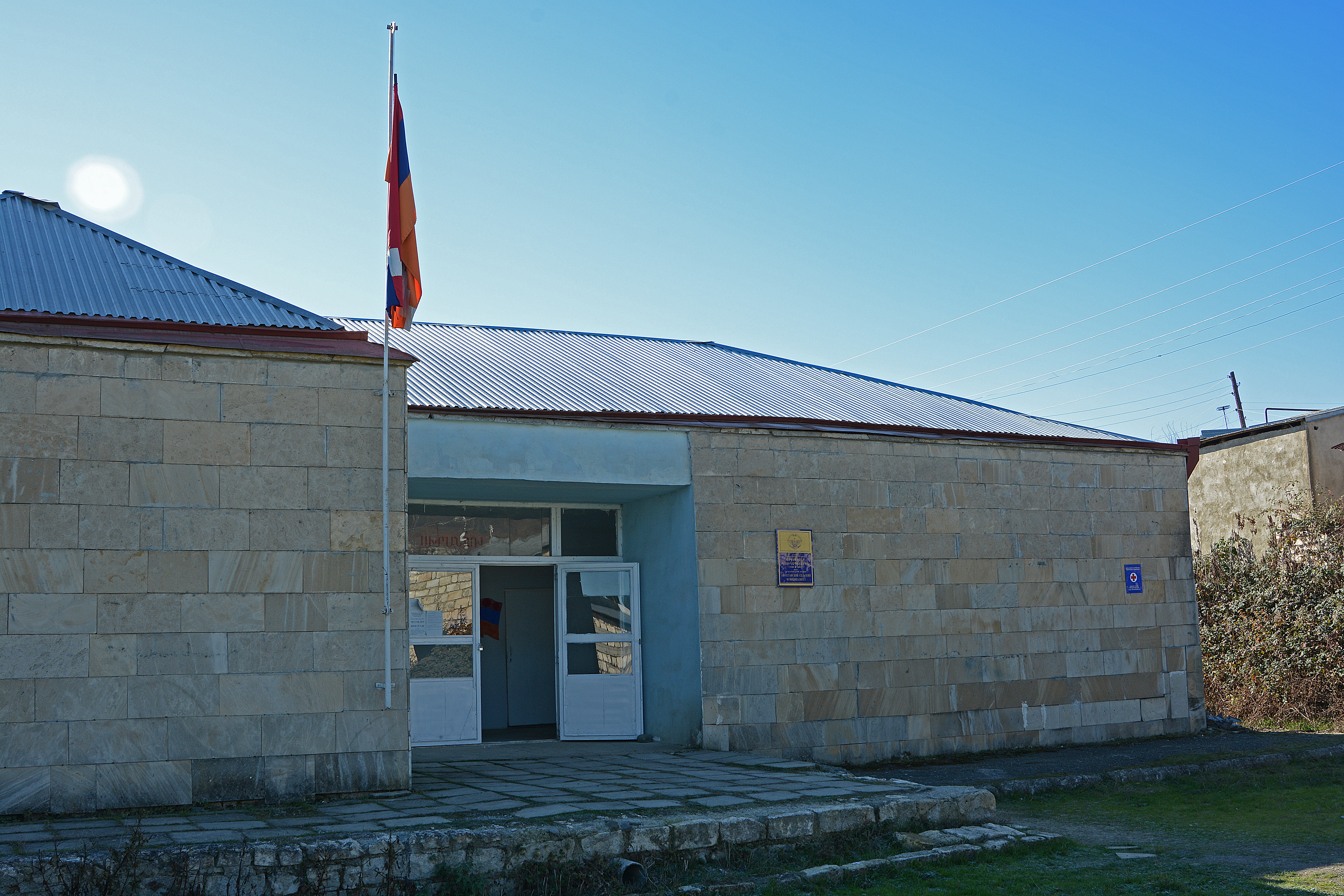
Municipal building

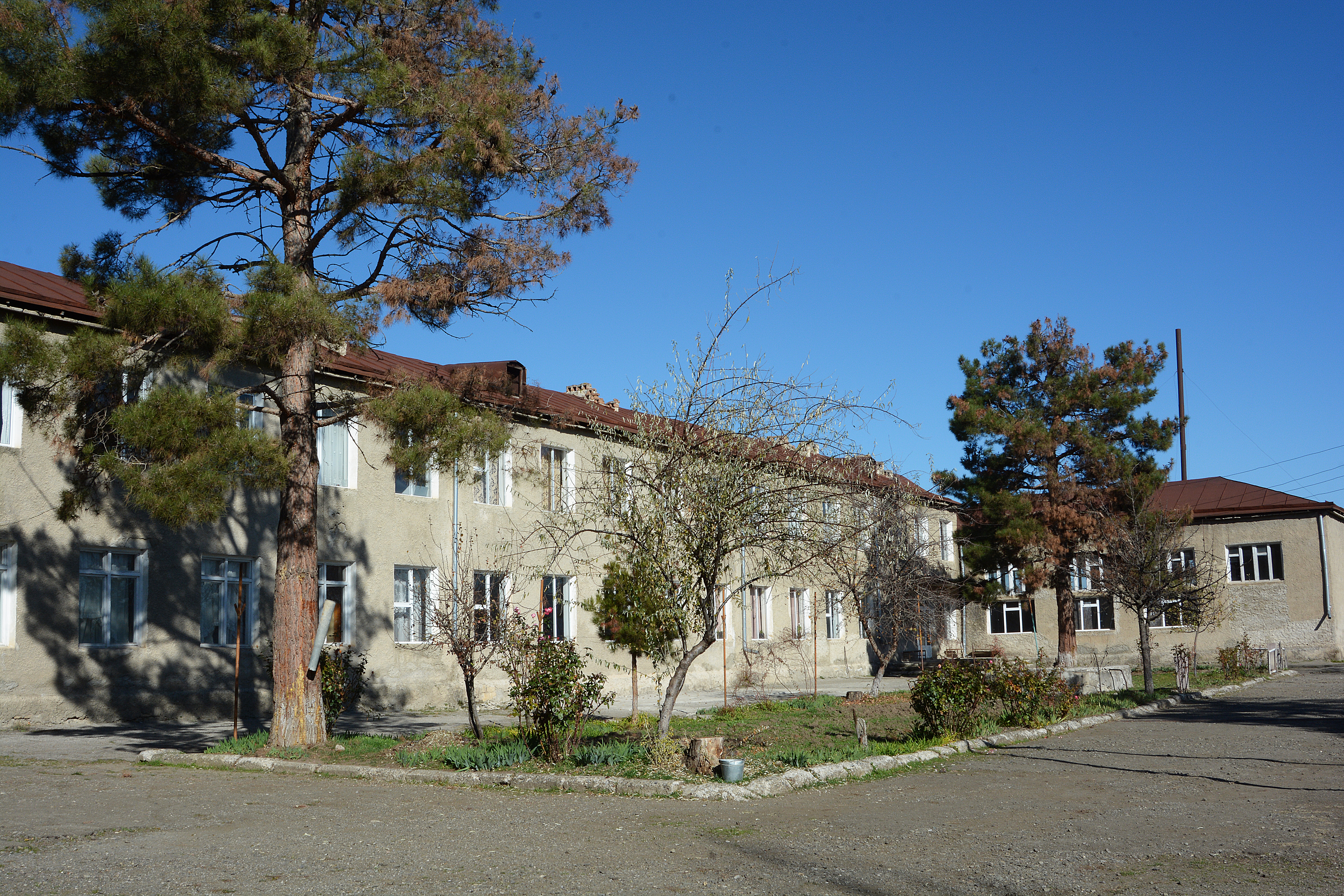
School

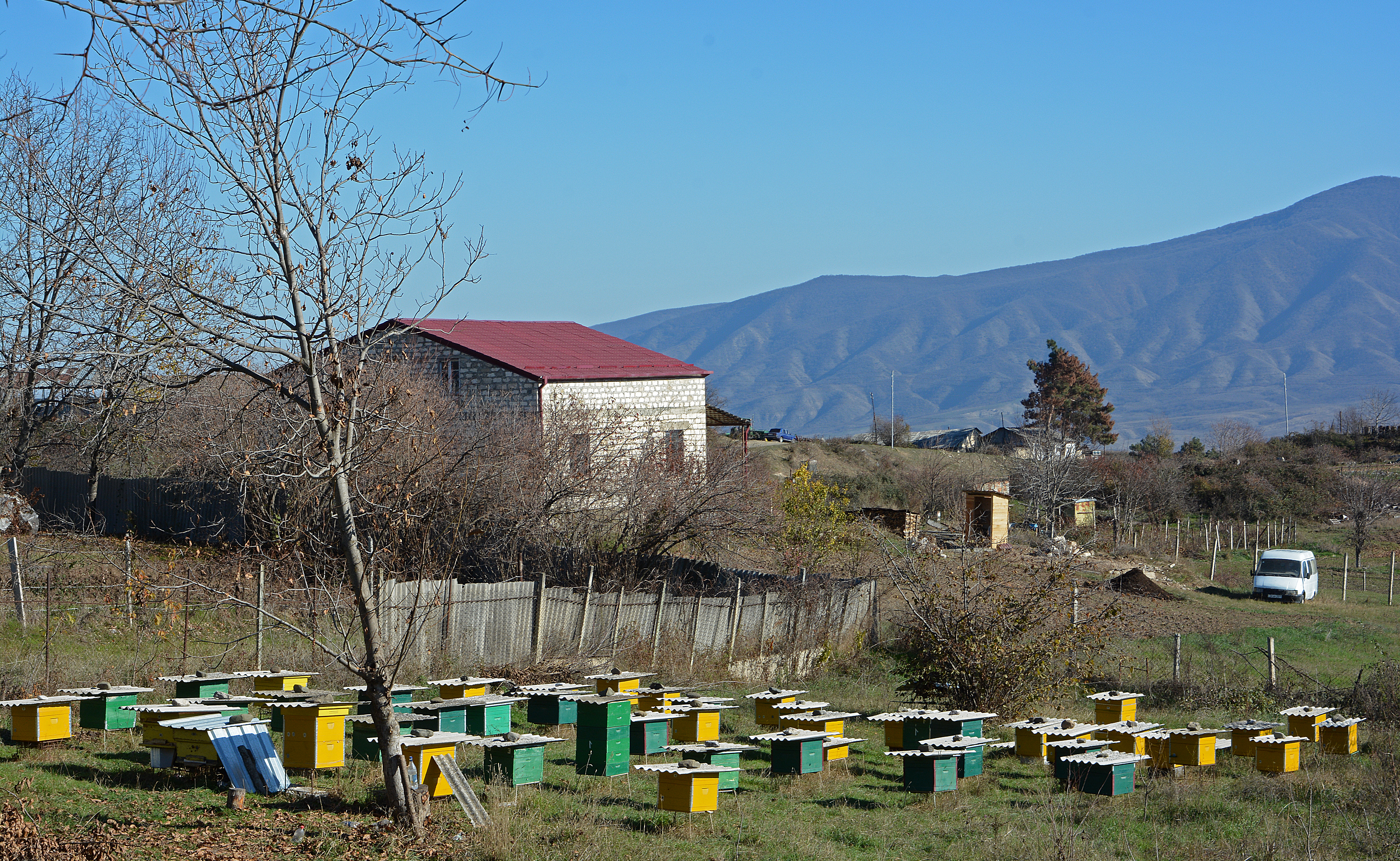
Beekeeping

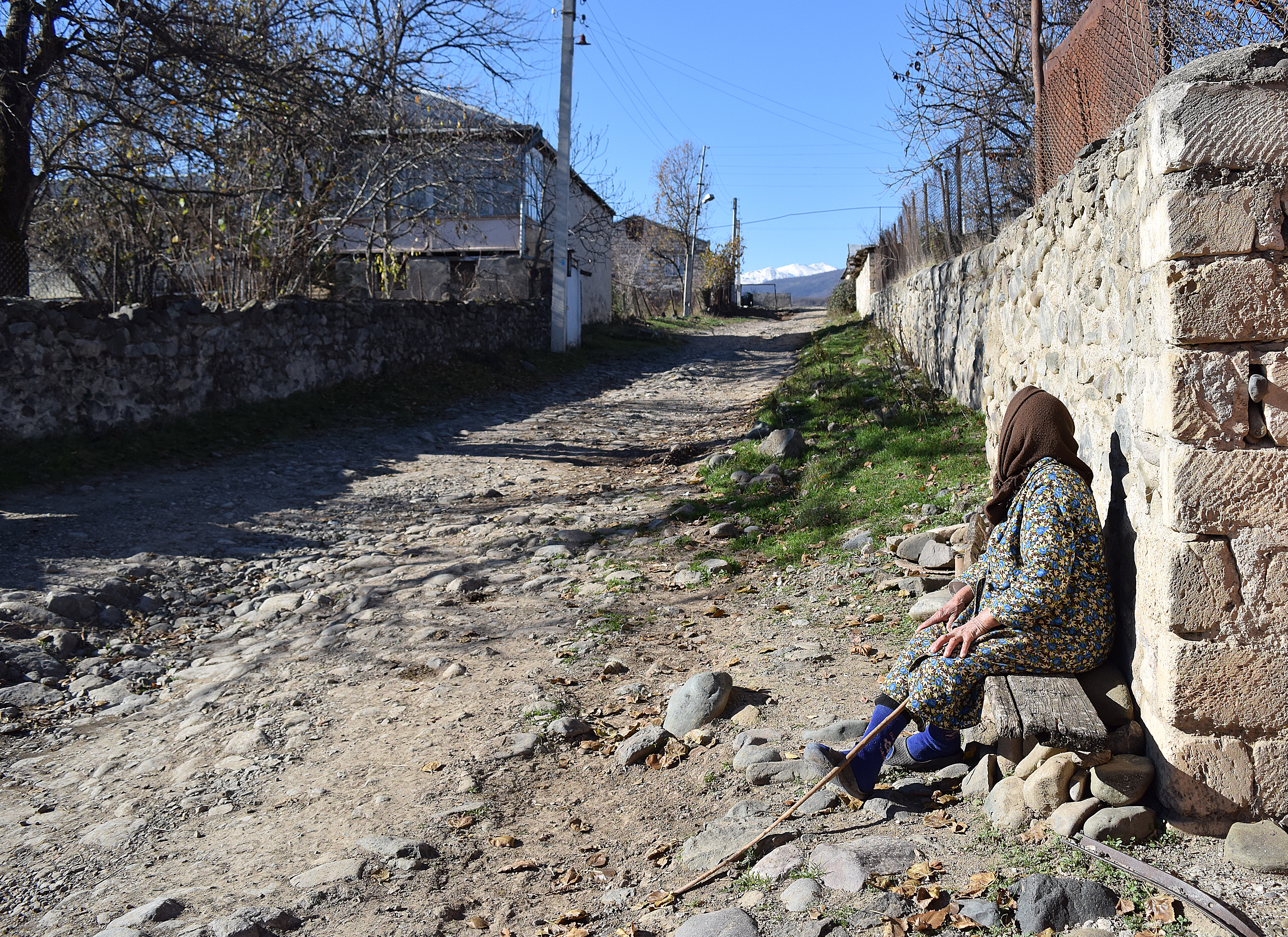
Street

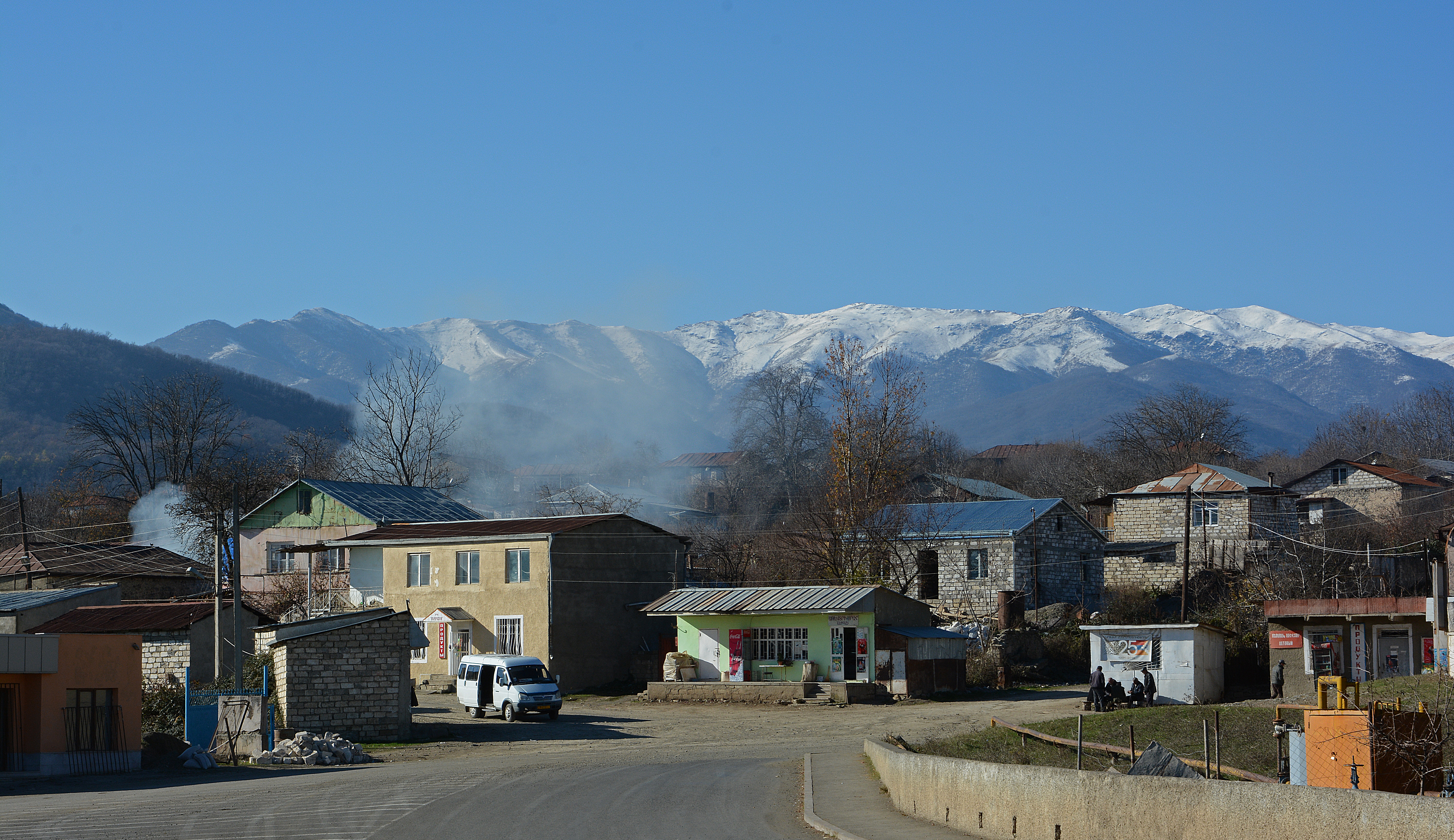
A view of the village

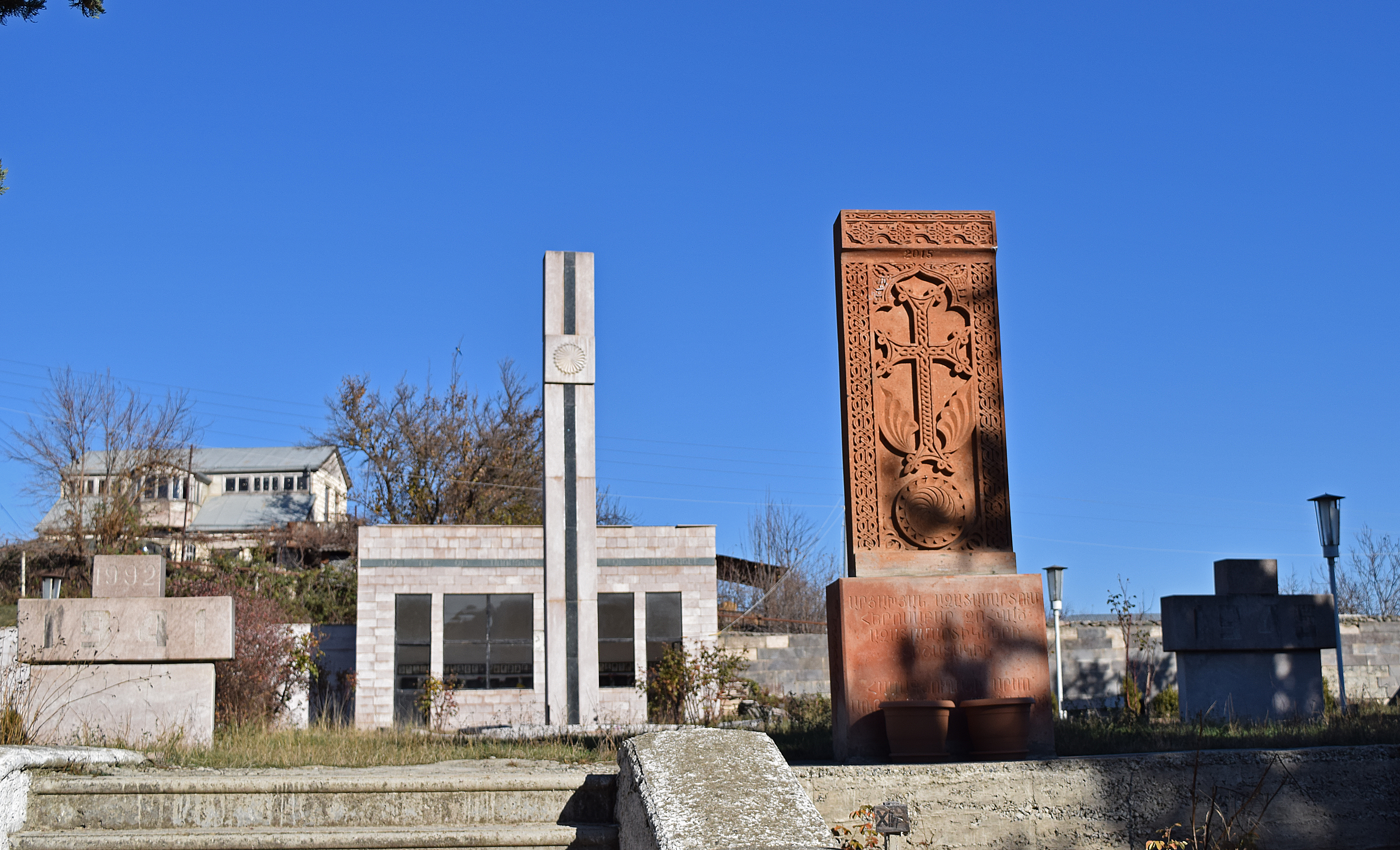
WWII (Great Patriotic War) monument
