= David Grigoryan (serviceman) =

Armenian serviceman (2000–2020)

- Դավիթ Գրիգորյան
- Born: November 17, 2000; Sardarapat, Armavir Province, Armenia
- Died: 2–3 November 2020 (aged 19); Republic of Artsakh (de facto)
- Military career
- Allegiance: Artsakh
- Branch: Artsakh Defence Army
- Conflicts: Second Nagorno-Karabakh War †
- Awards: Hero of Artsakh; Golden Eagle medal

David Grigoryan (Armenian: Դավիթ Գրիգորյան; 17 November 2000 – 2–3 November 2020) was an Armenian servicemen in the Artsakh Defense Army, participant of the Second Nagorno-Karabakh war. In 2020 he was awarded the Hero of Artsakh military award, which is the highest honorary title of the Republic of Artsakh.

== Biography ==
Grigoryan grew up in the village of Sardarapat, Armavir Province. He was the youngest child and the only son in the family.

In 2007–2018 he attended Sardarapat Secondary School. In 2008, 2010, 2011 and 2012, Grigoryan was awarded with commendations for excellent progress and exemplary behavior.

He was a student at the Armenian State University of Economics in Yerevan. After enlistment he studied for six months and was conscripted into the army.

He won several chess medals and was interested in sports, karate and chess.

On the night of 2–3 November 2020, Grigoryan and his three friends died during the war in Artsakh.

== Awards and honours ==
On October 4, 2020, by the decree of the President of the Republic of Artsakh Arayik Harutyunyan, David Grigoryan was awarded the title of Hero of Artsakh.

For exceptional services rendered to the Artsakh Republic while defending and ensuring the security of the Motherland, as well as for bravery and personal courage, I have awarded Defense Army servicemen ... David Grigoryan ... with the highest title of the "Hero of Artsakh", awarding [him] with the "Golden Eagle" order.
— President of the Republic of Artsakh, Arayik Harutyunyan

According to Armenian authorities, Grigoryan destroyed 15 Azerbaijani tanks and one combat vehicle during the 2020 war in Nagorno-Karabakh. Sardarapat Secondary School, where he studied, received a gold medal in his honour.

== Family ==
David was the only son in the family. He had two sisters.
