= Hero of Artsakh =

- Type: Order
- Awarded for: "Exceptional services in the defense of the state, strengthening its economic might, and for creating significant national values."
- Country: Artsakh
- Presented by: the President of Artsakh
- Status: No longer awarded
- Final award: 4 September 2021
- Ribbon

Precedence
- Next (lower): Order of Combat Cross

Hero of Artsakh (Armenian: Արցախի հերոս, romanized: Artsakhi heros) was the highest title of the self-proclaimed Republic of Artsakh. According to the official website of the President of Artsakh, the title Hero of Artsakh "is awarded for exceptional services in the defense of the state, strengthening its economic might, and for creating significant national values."

Recipients of the title are decorated with the Order of the Golden Eagle.

In 2016 Robert Abajyan became the 24th "Hero of Artsakh" awardee, as well as the youngest person ever to hold the title at 19 years old.

During and after 2020 Nagorno-Karabakh war 23 servicemen were awarded the highest state title of "Hero of Artsakh".

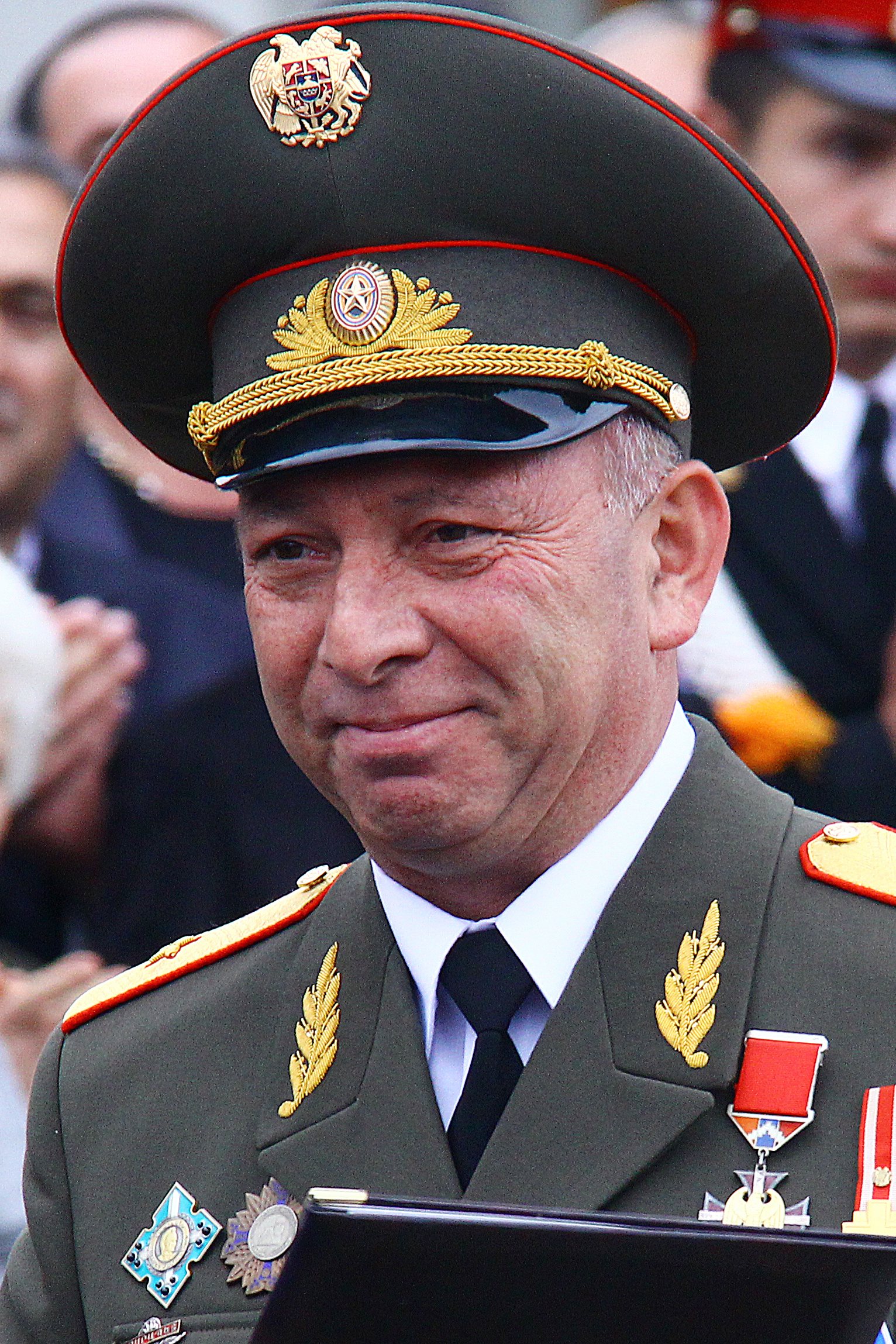
Award (top right) as worn by General Samvel Karapetyan

== Recipients ==
- Samvel Babayan (Renounced in 2020)
- Vazgen Sargsyan
- Ashot Ghulian (posthumously)
- Monte Melkonian (posthumously)
- Seyran Ohanian
- Robert Kocharyan
- Kristapor Ivanyan (posthumously)
- Manvel Grigoryan
- Samvel Karapetian
- Serzh Sargsyan
- Petros Ghevondyan
- Yura Poghosyan
- Vitaly Balasanyan
- Georgy Gasparyan
- Vahagn Vardanyan
- Movses Hakobyan
- Zori Balayan
- Arshavir Gharamyan
- Arkady Ghukasyan
- Arkady Ter-Tadevosyan
- Shahen Meghrian (posthumously)
- Pargev Martirosyan
- Robert Abajyan (posthumously)
- Artur Aghabekyan
- Zhanna Galstyan
- Leonid Azgaldyan (posthumously)
- Vladimir Balayan
- Armenak Urfanyan
- Artur Mkrtchyan (posthumously)
- Karen Jalavyan
- David Grigoryan
- Edgar Markosyan
- Yura Alaverdyan
- Sergey Shakaryan (posthumously)
- David Ghazaryan (posthumously)
- Armen Knyazyan
- Suren Barseghyan
- Alexander Harutyunyan
- Menua Hovhannisyan (posthumously)
- Jalal Harutyunyan
- Ararat Melkumyan
- Rustam Gasparyan (posthumously)
- Karen Shakaryan (posthumously)
- Hunan Hayrumyan (posthumously)
- Hakob Harutyunyan (posthumously)
- Igor Muradyan (posthumously)
- Vigen Shirinyan (posthumously)
- Narek Hovhannisyan (posthumously)
- Tovmas Tovmasyan (posthumously)
- David Arushanyan (posthumously)
- Samvel Ghazaryan (posthumously)
- Alen Margaryan (posthumously)
- Artur Aghasyan (posthumously)
- Vardan Avetisyan
- Artur Alexanyan
- Samvel Gevorgyan
- Albert Hovhannisyan (posthumously)

== See also ==
- National Hero of Armenia
