= Revolutions of 1989 =

Revolutionary wave overthrowing most communist states in Europe

- Part of the Cold War (until 1991)
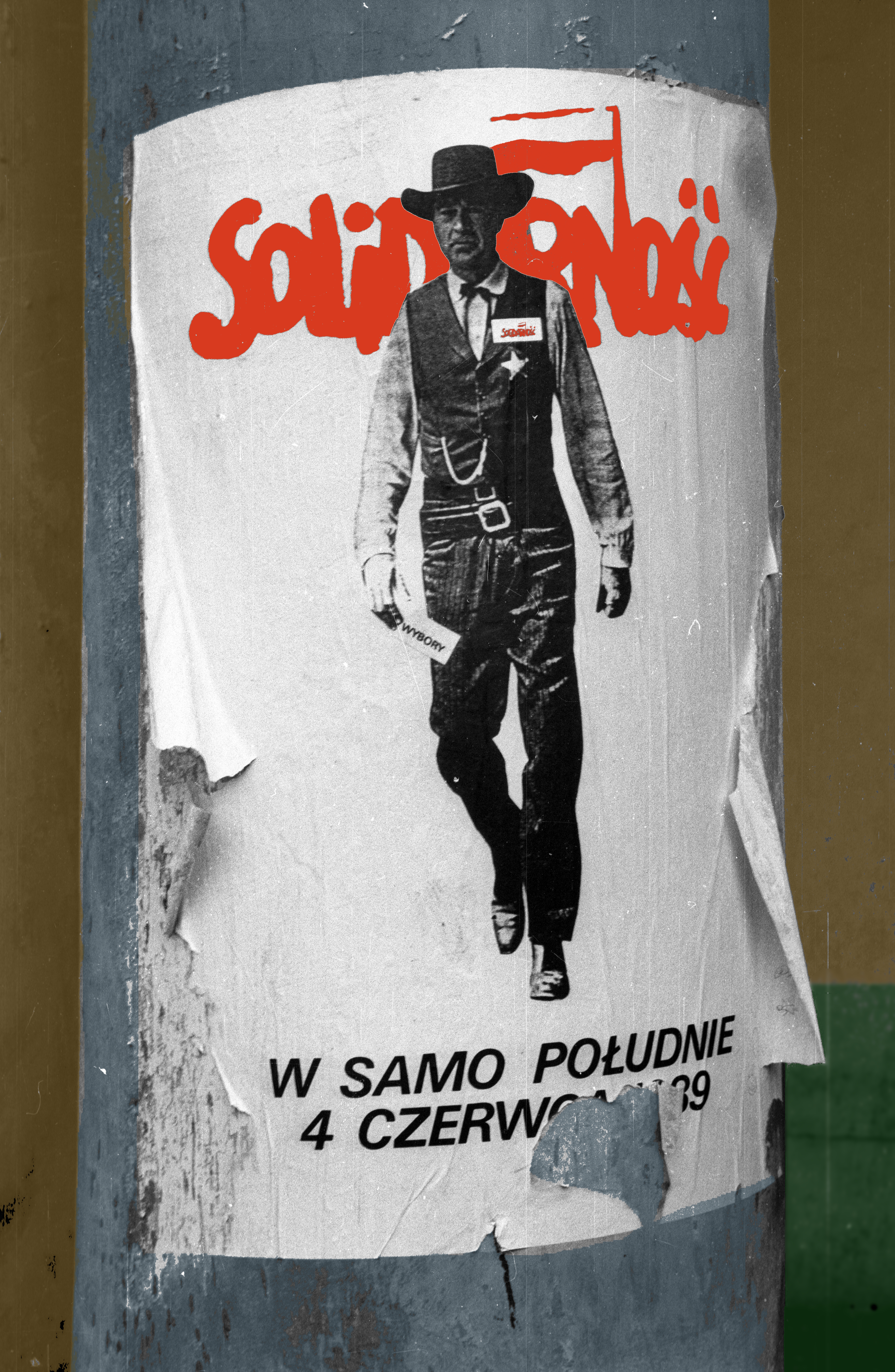
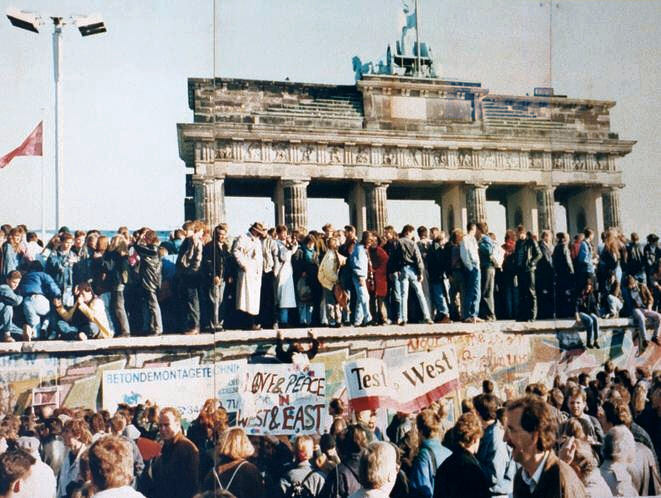
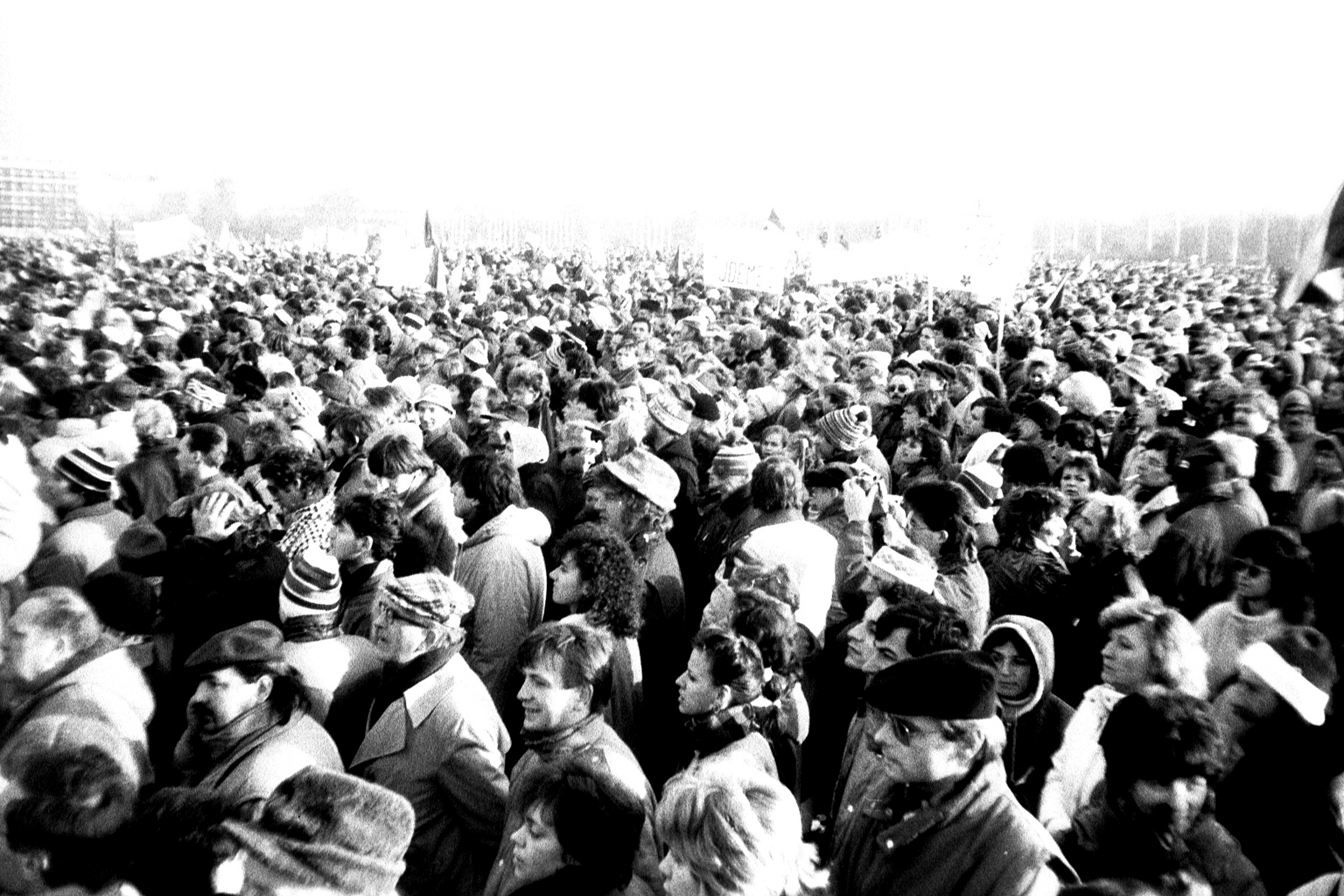
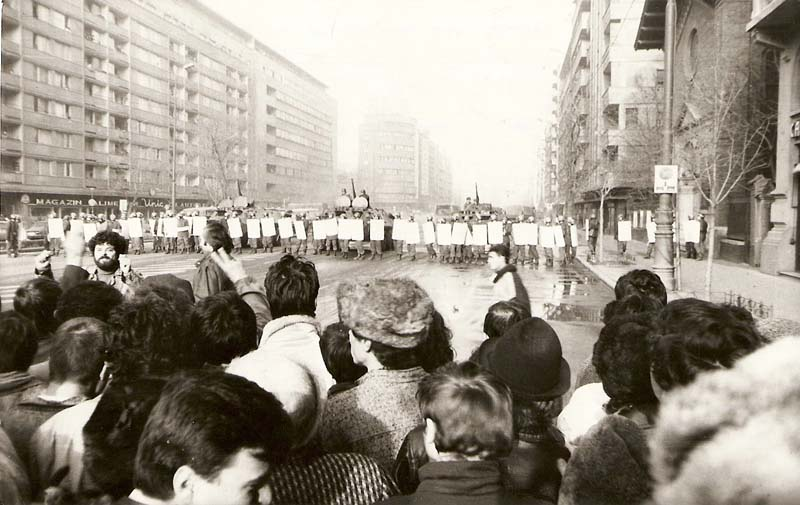
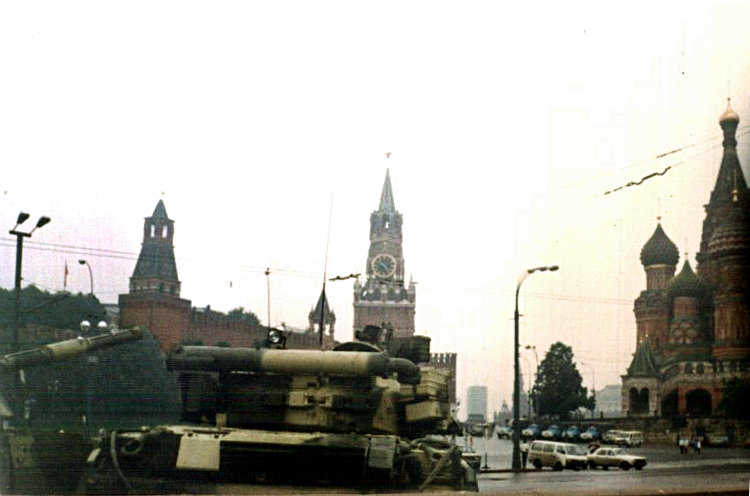
- Top to bottom, left to right: Solidarność poster from the June 1989 Polish parliamentary election which led to the first dissolution of a Communist regime in August 1989; Fall of the Berlin Wall, November 1989; Demonstration in Prague during the Velvet Revolution, November 1989; Tanks and Miliția in Bucharest during the Romanian revolution, December 1989; Tanks in Moscow during the Soviet coup attempt, August 1991
- Date: Late 1980s – early 1990s Main phase: 12 May 1988 – 26 December 1991 (3 years, 7 months and 2 weeks)
- Location: Central and Eastern Europe, Latin America, Africa, and Asia
- Caused by: Political repression; Authoritarianism and totalitarianism; Democratization; Nationalism; Religious persecution; Austerity; Economic crises and consumerist pressure; Anti-communism
- Methods: Reform; mass protests; civil resistance; riots; war
- Result: End of most communist states and the end of the Cold War

Parties
Anti-Communist and pro-democratic protesters: Political dissidents; Communist Party defectors	Communist reformers	Communist hardliners: State Committee on the State of Emergency

The revolutions of 1989, also known as the Fall of Communism, were a wave of liberal democratic movements that resulted in the collapse of most Marxist–Leninist governments in the Eastern Bloc and other parts of the world (this wave is sometimes referred to as the "Autumn of Nations", in reference to the revolutions of 1848 as the "Spring of Nations"). The revolutions of 1989 were a key factor in the dissolution of the Soviet Union—one of the two superpowers—and abandonment of communist regimes in many parts of the world, some of which were violently overthrown. These events drastically altered the world's balance of power, marking the end of the Cold War and beginning of the post–Cold War era.

The earliest recorded protests, which led to the revolutions, began in Poland on 14 August 1980, the massive general strike which led to the August Agreements and establishment of Solidarity, the first and only independent trade union in the Eastern Bloc, whose peak membership reached 10 million. The main region of the 1989 revolutions was Central Europe, starting in Poland with the 1988 Polish strikes, and continued in Hungary, East Germany, Bulgaria, Czechoslovakia, and Romania.

From April to June 1989, China experienced the Tiananmen Square protests, which eventually led to a military crackdown on 4 June, ensuring the continued rule of the Chinese Communist Party. On 4 June 1989, Poland conducted the first elections that led to the dissolution of the communist government, with Solidarity winning an overwhelming victory, leading to the peaceful fall of communism in Poland. Influenced by Poland, Hungary organised round table-format talks and began dismantling its section of the Iron Curtain. In August 1989, over a quarter of the population of the Baltic states formed a human chain covering 675 kilometres (419 mi) in the Baltic Way, protesting the occupation by the Soviet Union, while the opening of a border gate between Austria and Hungary set in motion a peaceful chain reaction, in which the Eastern Bloc disintegrated. This led to mass demonstrations in cities of East Germany and the fall of the Berlin Wall in November 1989, which served as the symbolic gateway to German reunification in 1990.

A feature common to these developments was the extensive use of campaigns of civil resistance, demonstrating popular opposition to the continuation of one-party rule and contributing to pressure for change. Romania was the only country in which citizens and opposition forces used violence to overthrow its communist regime, although Romania was politically isolated from the rest of the Eastern Bloc.

The Soviet Union became a multi-party semi-presidential republic from March 1990 and held its first presidential election, marking a drastic change as part of its reform program. The Soviet Union dissolved in December 1991, resulting in seven new countries which had declared their independence from the Soviet Union, while the Baltic states regained their independence in September 1991 along with Ukraine, Georgia, Azerbaijan and Armenia. The rest of the Soviet Union continued with the establishment of the Russian Federation. Albania and Yugoslavia abandoned communism between 1990 and 1992, by which time Yugoslavia had split into five new countries. Czechoslovakia dissolved three years after the end of communist rule, splitting peacefully into the Czech Republic and Slovakia on 1 January 1993. North Korea abandoned Marxism–Leninism in 1992. The Cold War is considered to have ended on 3 December 1989 during the Malta Summit between the Soviet and American leaders. However, many historians conclude that the dissolution of the Soviet Union on 26 December 1991 was the true end of the Cold War.

The impact of these events were felt in many third world socialist states. Concurrently with events in Poland, protests in Tiananmen Square (April–June 1989) failed to stimulate major political changes in China, but influential images helped to precipitate events in other parts of the globe. Afghanistan, Cambodia and Mongolia, had abandoned communism by 1992–93, either through reform or conflict. Eight countries in Africa or its environs also abandoned it, namely Ethiopia, Angola, Benin, Congo-Brazzaville, Mozambique, Somalia, as well as South Yemen, which unified with North Yemen to form Yemen. Political reforms varied, but communist parties lost a monopoly on power in all but five countries; namely China, Cuba, Laos, North Korea, and Vietnam. Vietnam, Laos, and China had previously made economic reforms to adopt some forms of market economy under market socialism.

The European political landscape changed drastically, with former Eastern Bloc countries joining NATO and the European Union, resulting in stronger economic and social integration with Western Europe and North America. Many communist and socialist organisations in the West turned their guiding principles over to social democracy and democratic socialism. In South America, a pink tide began in Venezuela in 1999 and shaped politics in the other parts of the continent through the early 2000s. Meanwhile, in certain countries the aftermath of these revolutions resulted in conflict and wars, including post-Soviet conflicts that remain, as well as large-scale wars, most notably the Yugoslav Wars which led to the Bosnian genocide.

== Background ==
=== Emergence of Solidarity in Poland ===
Labour turmoil in Poland during 1980 led to the formation of the independent trade union Solidarity, led by Lech Wałęsa, which over time became a political force. Nevertheless, on 13 December 1981, Polish prime minister Wojciech Jaruzelski started a crackdown on Solidarity by declaring martial law in Poland, suspending the union, and temporarily imprisoning all of its leaders.

=== Mikhail Gorbachev ===
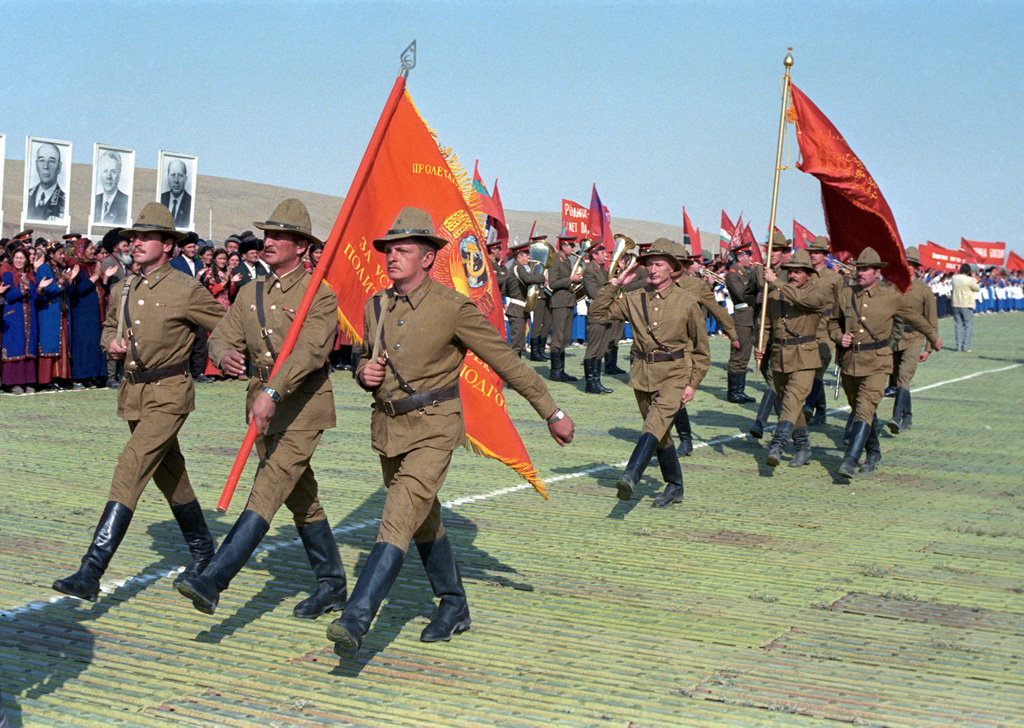
The first stage of Soviet forces withdrawing from Afghanistan, 20 October 1986

Although several Eastern Bloc countries had attempted some abortive, limited economic and political reform since the 1950s (e.g. the Hungarian Revolution of 1956 and Prague Spring of 1968), the ascension of reform-minded Soviet leader Mikhail Gorbachev in 1985 signaled the trend toward greater liberalization. During the mid-1980s, a younger generation of Soviet apparatchiks, led by Gorbachev, began advocating fundamental reform in order to reverse years of Brezhnev stagnation. After decades of growth, the Soviet Union was now facing a period of severe economic decline and needed Western technology and credits to make up for its increasing backwardness. The costs of maintaining its military, the KGB, and subsidies to foreign client states further strained the moribund Soviet economy.

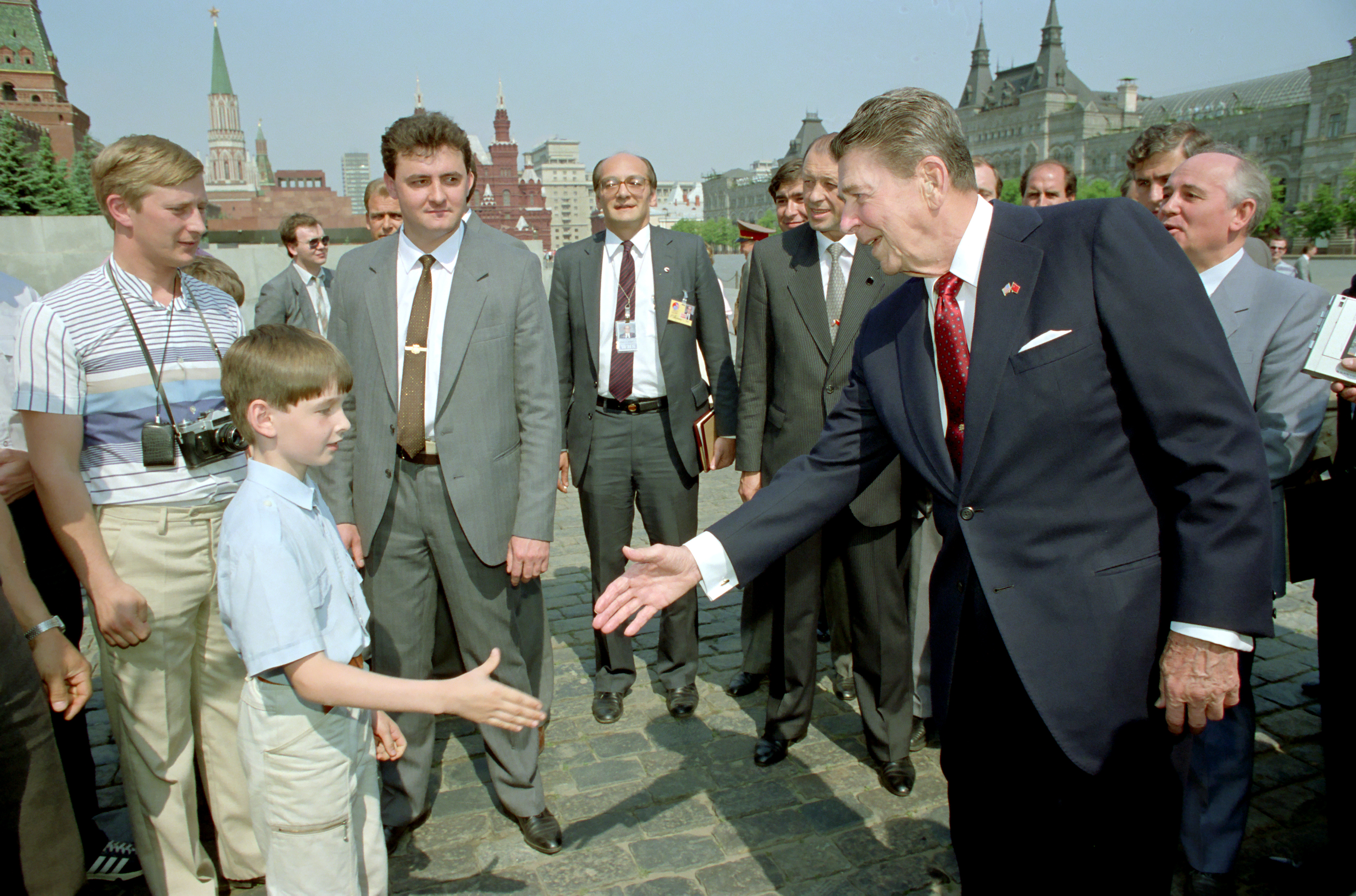
US President Ronald Reagan and Mikhail Gorbachev in Red Square, Moscow, 31 May 1988

Mikhail Gorbachev succeeded to the General Secretary of the Communist Party of the Soviet Union and came to power in 1985. The first signs of major reform came in 1986 when Gorbachev launched a policy of glasnost (openness) in the Soviet Union, and emphasized the need for perestroika (economic restructuring). By the spring of 1989, the Soviet Union had not only experienced lively media debate but had also held its first multi-candidate elections in the newly established Congress of People's Deputies. While glasnost ostensibly advocated openness and political criticism, these were only permitted within a narrow spectrum dictated by the state. The general public in the Eastern Bloc was still subject to secret police and political repression.

Gorbachev urged his Central and Southeast European counterparts to imitate perestroika and glasnost in their own countries. However, while reformists in Hungary and Poland were emboldened by the force of liberalization spreading from the east, other Eastern Bloc countries remained openly skeptical and demonstrated aversion to reform. Believing Gorbachev's reform initiatives would be short-lived, hardline communist rulers like East Germany's Erich Honecker, Bulgaria's Todor Zhivkov, Czechoslovakia's Gustáv Husák and Romania's Nicolae Ceaușescu obstinately ignored the calls for change. "When your neighbor puts up new wallpaper, it doesn't mean you have to too," declared one East German politburo member.

=== Soviet republics ===
An animated series of maps showing the fall of the communist regimes in Eastern Europe and the dissolution of the Soviet Union, which later led to conflicts in the post-Soviet space

By the late 1980s, people in the Caucasus and Baltic states were demanding more autonomy from Moscow, and the Kremlin was losing some of its control over certain regions and elements in the Soviet Union. Cracks in the Soviet system had begun in December 1986 in Kazakhstan when its citizens protested over an ethnic Russian who had been appointed as the secretary of the CPSU's Kazakh republican branch. These protests were put down after three days.

In November 1988, the Estonian Soviet Socialist Republic issued a declaration of sovereignty, which would eventually lead to other states making similar declarations of autonomy.

The Chernobyl disaster in April 1986 had major political and social effects that catalyzed or at least partially caused the revolutions of 1989. One political result of the disaster was the greatly increased significance of the new Soviet policy of glasnost. It is difficult to establish the total economic cost of the disaster. According to Gorbachev, the Soviet Union spent 18 billion roubles (the equivalent of US$18 billion at that time) on containment and decontamination, virtually bankrupting itself.

=== Impact of Solidarity grows ===
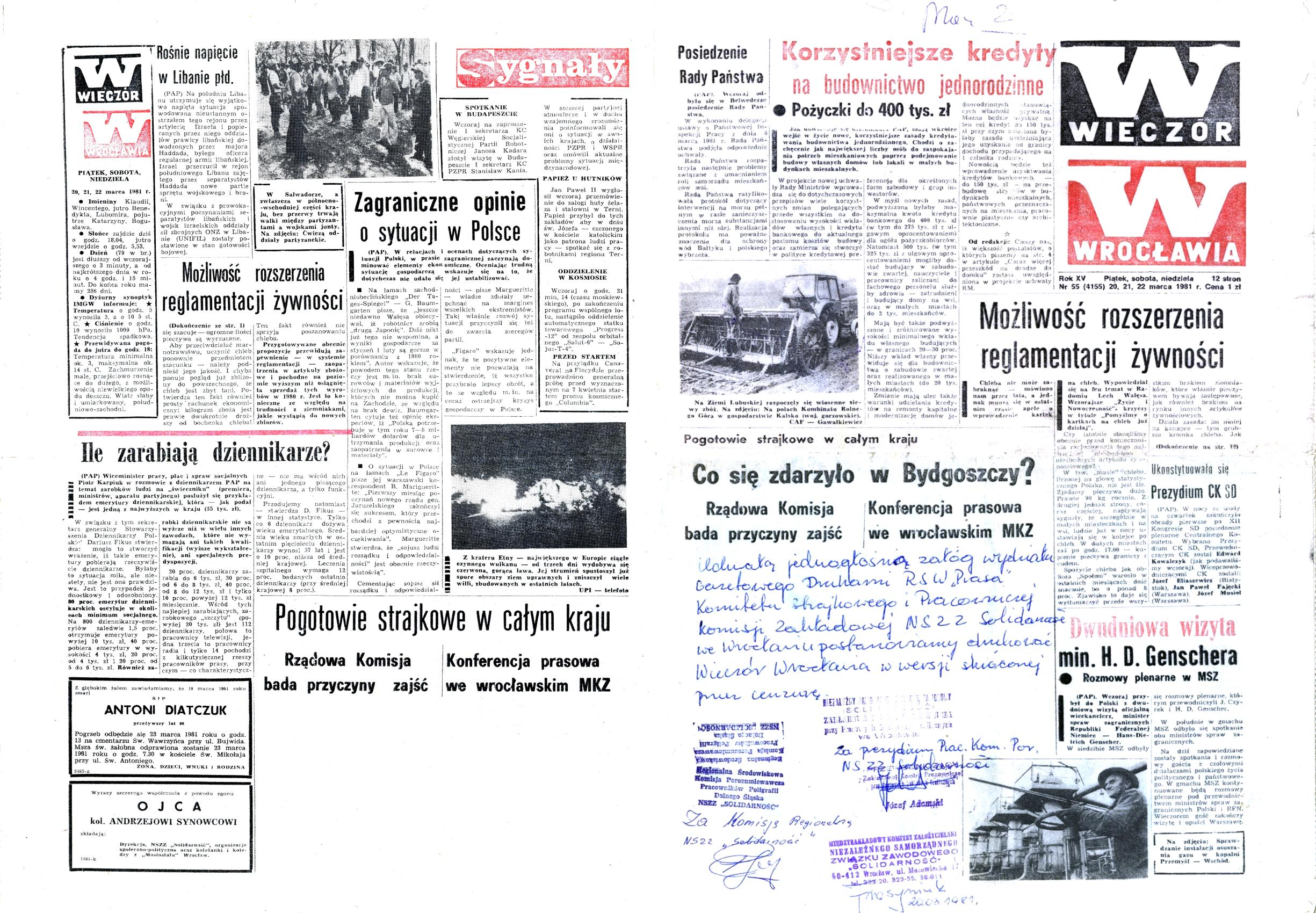
The 20–21 March 1981 issue of Wieczór Wrocławia (This Evening in Wrocław) shows blank spaces remaining after the government censor pulled articles from page 1 (right, "What happened at Bydgoszcz?") and from the last page (left, "Country-wide strike alert"), leaving only their titles as the printers—Solidarity-trade-union members—decided to run the newspaper with blank spaces intact. The bottom of page 1 of this master copy bears the hand-written Solidarity confirmation of that decision.

Throughout the mid-1980s, Solidarity persisted solely as an underground organization, supported by the Catholic Church. However, by the late 1980s, Solidarity became sufficiently strong to frustrate Jaruzelski's attempts at reform, and nationwide strikes in 1988 forced the government to open dialogue with Solidarity. On 9 March 1989, both sides agreed to a bicameral legislature called the National Assembly. The already existing Sejm would become the lower house. The Senate would be elected by the people. Traditionally a ceremonial office, the presidency was given more powers (Polish Round Table Agreement).

On 7 July 1989, General Secretary Mikhail Gorbachev implicitly renounced the use of force against other Soviet-bloc nations. Speaking to members of the 23-nation Council of Europe, Mr. Gorbachev made no direct reference to the so-called Brezhnev Doctrine, under which Moscow had asserted the right to use force to prevent a Warsaw Pact member from leaving the communist fold. He stated, "Any interference in domestic affairs and any attempts to restrict the sovereignty of states—friends, allies or any others—are inadmissible". The policy was termed the Sinatra Doctrine, in a joking reference to the Frank Sinatra song "My Way". Poland became the first Warsaw Pact country to break free of Soviet domination.

=== Protests and revolutions in the Western Bloc ===
The 1980s revolutions occurred in Western Bloc regimes as well.

In February 1986, the People Power Revolution in the Philippines peacefully overthrew dictator Ferdinand Marcos and inaugurated Corazon "Cory" Aquino as the president.

In 1987, the South Korean June Democratic Struggle against the military dictatorship of Chun Doo-hwan occurred after Roh Tae-woo was designated as Chun's successor without a direct election. Not wanting to escalate violence before the 1988 Summer Olympics being hosted in Seoul next year, the government made concessions with the protestors demands, including free elections, amnesty to political prisoners, restoring press freedom and revisions to the constitution.

The South African apartheid, the Pinochet military dictatorship in Chile, and the Suharto regime in Indonesia were gradually declining during the 1990s as the West withdrew their funding and diplomatic support. The First Intifada against Israeli occupation of the Palestinian territories occurred, giving rise of militant movement Hamas. Dictatorships such as Argentina, Ghana, Paraguay, Suriname, Republic of China and North-South Yemen, among others, elected democratic governments.

Exact tallies of the number of democracies vary depending on the criteria used for assessment, but by some measures by the late 1990s there were well over 100 democracies in the world, a marked increase in just a few decades.

== History ==
=== National political movements ===
==== Poland ====
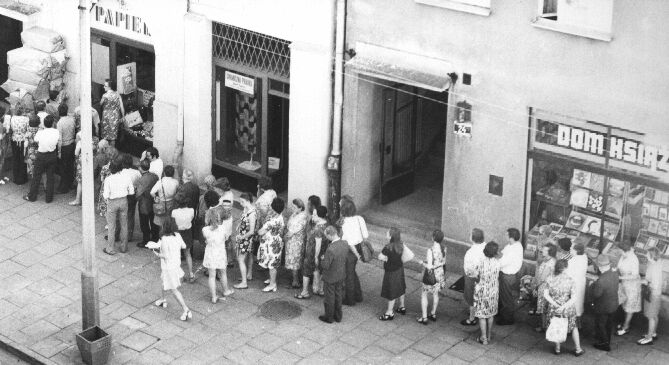
People queue waiting to enter a store, a typical view in Poland in the 1980s

A wave of strikes hit Poland from 21 April, which continued in May 1988. A second wave began on 15 August, when a strike broke out at the July Manifesto coal mine in Jastrzębie-Zdrój, with the workers demanding the re-legalisation of the Solidarity trade union. Over the next few days, sixteen other mines went on strike followed by a number of shipyards, including on 22 August the Gdansk Shipyard, famous as the epicentre of the 1980 industrial unrest that spawned Solidarity. On 31 August 1988 Lech Wałęsa, the leader of Solidarity, was invited to Warsaw by the communist authorities, who had finally agreed to talks.

On 18 January 1989, at a stormy session of the Tenth Plenary Session of the ruling United Workers' Party, General Wojciech Jaruzelski, the First Secretary, managed to get party backing for formal negotiations with Solidarity leading to its future legalisation, although this was achieved only by threatening the resignation of the entire party leadership if thwarted. On 6 February 1989 formal Round Table discussions began in the Hall of Columns in Warsaw. On 4 April 1989 the historic Round Table Agreement was signed legalising Solidarity and setting up partly free parliamentary elections to be held on 4 June 1989, incidentally, the day following the midnight massacre of Chinese protesters in Tiananmen Square.

A political earthquake followed as the victory of Solidarity surpassed all predictions. Solidarity candidates captured all the seats they were allowed to compete for in the Sejm. In the Senate they captured 99 out of the 100 available seats, with the one remaining seat taken by an independent candidate. At the same time, many prominent communist candidates failed to gain even the minimum number of votes required to capture the seats that were reserved for them.

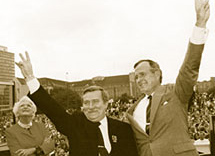
Solidarity Chairman Lech Wałęsa (center) with President George H. W. Bush (right) and Barbara Bush (left) in Warsaw, July 1989

On 15 August 1989, the communists' two longtime coalition partners, the United People's Party (ZSL) and the Democratic Party (SD), broke their alliance with the PZPR and announced their support for Solidarity. The last communist prime minister of Poland, General Czesław Kiszczak, said he would resign to allow a non-communist to form an administration. As Solidarity was the only other political grouping that could possibly form a government, it was virtually assured that a Solidarity member would become prime minister.

On 19 August 1989, in a stunning watershed moment, Tadeusz Mazowiecki, an anti-communist editor, Solidarity supporter, and devout Catholic, was nominated as Prime Minister of Poland and the Soviet Union voiced no protest. Five days later, on 24 August 1989, Poland's Parliament ended more than 40 years of one-party rule by making Mazowiecki the country's first non-communist Prime Minister since the early postwar years. In a tense Parliament, Mazowiecki received 378 votes, with 4 against and 41 abstentions. On 13 September 1989, a new non-communist government was approved by parliament, the first of its kind in the Eastern Bloc.

On 17 November 1989, the statue of Felix Dzerzhinsky, Polish founder of the Cheka and symbol of communist oppression, was torn down in Bank Square, Warsaw. On 29 December 1989 the Sejm amended the constitution to change the official name of the country from the People's Republic of Poland to the Republic of Poland. The communist Polish United Workers' Party dissolved itself on 29 January 1990 and transformed itself into the Social Democracy of the Republic of Poland.

In 1990, Jaruzelski resigned as Poland's president and was succeeded by Wałęsa, who won the 1990 presidential elections held in two rounds on 25 November and 9 December. Wałęsa's inauguration as president on 21 December 1990 is considered by many as the formal end of the communist People's Republic of Poland and the start of the modern Republic of Poland. The Warsaw Pact was dissolved on 1 July 1991. On 27 October 1991 the first entirely free Polish parliamentary elections since 1945 took place. This completed Poland's transition from communist Party rule to a Western-style liberal democratic political system. The last Russian troops left Poland on 18 September 1993.

==== Hungary ====
Following Poland's lead, Hungary was next to switch to a non-communist government. Although Hungary had achieved some lasting economic reforms and limited political liberalization during the 1980s, major reforms only occurred following the replacement of János Kádár as General Secretary of the communist Party on 23 May 1988 with Károly Grósz. On 24 November 1988 Miklós Németh was appointed prime minister. On 12 January 1989, the Parliament adopted a "democracy package", which included trade union pluralism; freedom of association, assembly, and the press; a new electoral law; and a radical revision of the constitution, among other provisions. On 29 January 1989, contradicting the official view of history held for more than 30 years, a member of the ruling Politburo, Imre Pozsgay, declared that Hungary's 1956 rebellion was a popular uprising rather than a foreign-instigated attempt at counterrevolution.

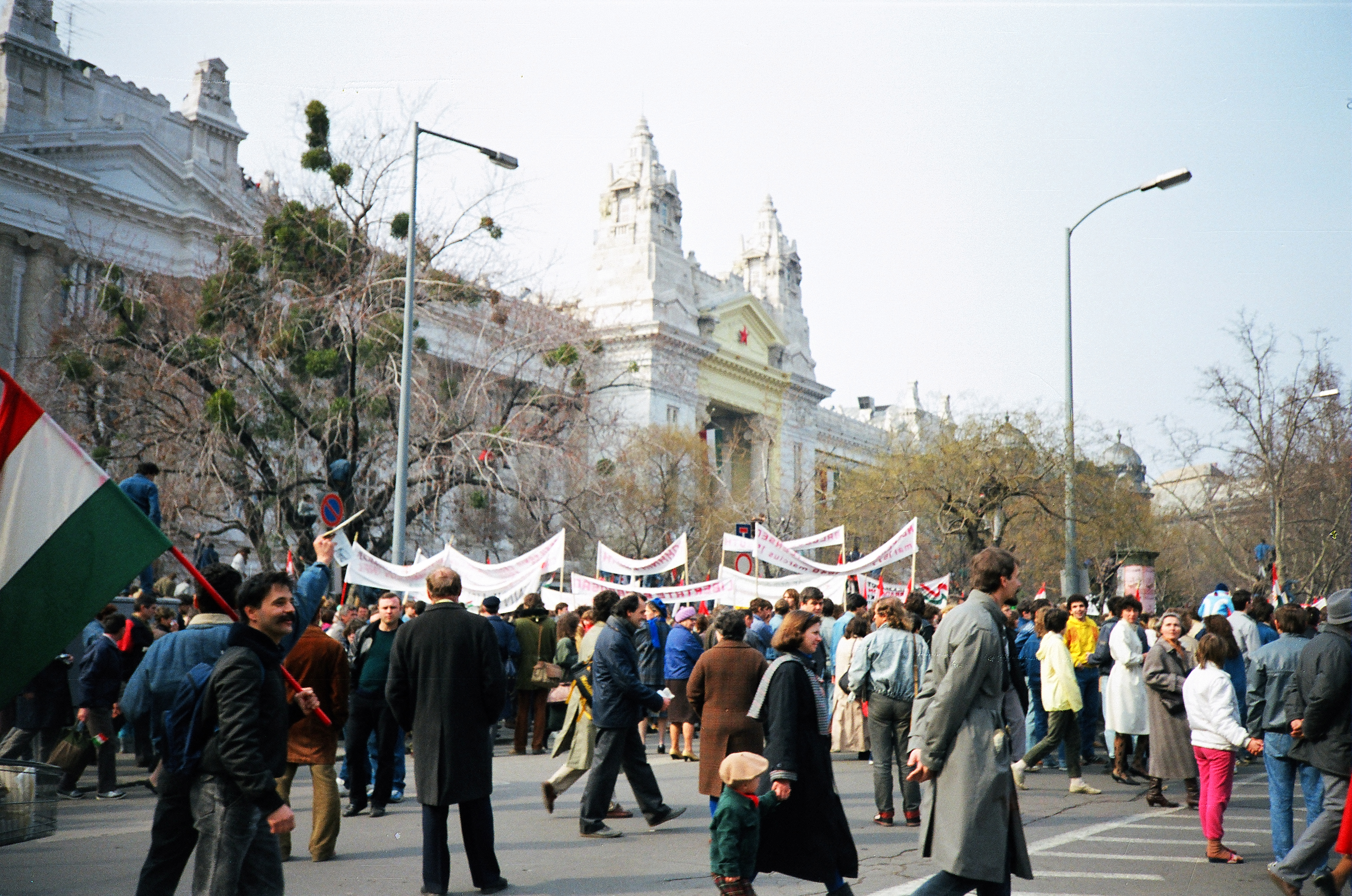
Hungarians demonstrate at state TV headquarters, 15 March 1989

Mass demonstrations on 15 March, the National Day, persuaded the regime to begin negotiations with the emergent non-communist political forces. Round Table talks began on 22 April and continued until the Round Table agreement was signed on 18 September. The talks involved the communists (MSzMP) and the newly emerging independent political forces Fidesz, the Alliance of Free Democrats (SzDSz), the Hungarian Democratic Forum (MDF), the Independent Smallholders' Party, the Hungarian People's Party, the Endre Bajcsy-Zsilinszky Society, and the Democratic Trade Union of Scientific Workers. At a later stage the Democratic Confederation of Free Trade Unions and the Christian Democratic People's Party (KDNP) were invited. At these talks a number of Hungary's future political leaders emerged, including László Sólyom, József Antall, György Szabad, Péter Tölgyessy and Viktor Orbán.

On 2 May 1989, the first visible cracks in the Iron Curtain appeared when Hungary began dismantling its 240-kilometre (150 mi) long border fence with Austria. This increasingly destabilized East Germany and Czechoslovakia over the summer and autumn, as thousands of their citizens illegally crossed over to the West through the Hungarian-Austrian border. On 1 June 1989 the Communist Party admitted that former prime minister Imre Nagy, hanged for treason for his role in the 1956 Hungarian uprising, was executed illegally after a show trial. On 16 June 1989 Nagy was given a solemn funeral on Budapest's largest square in front of crowds of at least 100,000, followed by a hero's burial.

The initially inconspicuous opening of a border gate of the Iron Curtain between Austria and Hungary in August 1989 then triggered a chain reaction, at the end of which the GDR no longer existed and the Eastern Bloc had disintegrated. It was the largest escape movement from East Germany since the Berlin Wall was built in 1961. The idea of opening the border came from Otto von Habsburg and was brought up by him to Németh, who promoted the idea. The local organization in Sopron took over the Hungarian Democratic Forum, the other contacts were made via Habsburg and Pozsgay.

Extensive advertising for the planned picnic was made by posters and flyers among the GDR holidaymakers in Hungary. The Austrian branch of the Paneuropean Union, which was then headed by Karl von Habsburg, distributed thousands of brochures inviting them to a picnic near the border at Sopron. After the pan-European picnic, Erich Honecker dictated the Daily Mirror of 19 August 1989: "Habsburg distributed leaflets far into Poland, on which the East German holidaymakers were invited to a picnic. When they came to the picnic, they were given gifts, food and Deutsche Mark, and then they were persuaded to come to the West."

With the mass exodus at the Pan-European Picnic, the subsequent hesitant behavior of the Socialist Unity Party of East Germany and the non-intervention of the Soviet Union broke the dams. Now tens of thousands of the media-informed East Germans made their way to Hungary, which was no longer ready to keep its borders completely closed or to oblige its border troops to use force of arms. In particular, the leadership of the GDR in East Berlin no longer dared to completely block the borders of their own country.

The Round Table agreement of 18 September encompassed six draft laws that covered an overhaul of the Constitution, establishment of a Constitutional Court, the functioning and management of political parties, multiparty elections for National Assembly deputies, the penal code and the law on penal procedures. The last two changes represented an additional separation of the Party from the state apparatus. The electoral system was a compromise: about half of the deputies would be elected proportionally and half by the majoritarian system. A weak presidency was agreed upon. No consensus was attained on who should elect the president, the parliament or the people, and when this election should occur, before or after parliamentary elections.

On 7 October 1989, the Communist Party, at its last congress, re-established itself as the Hungarian Socialist Party. In a historic session from 16 to 20 October, the parliament adopted legislation providing for a multi-party parliamentary election and a direct presidential election, which took place on 24 March 1990. The legislation transformed Hungary from a People's Republic into the Republic of Hungary, guaranteed human and civil rights, and created an institutional structure that ensured separation of powers among the judicial, legislative, and executive branches of government. On 23 October 1989, on the 33rd anniversary of the 1956 Revolution, the communist regime in Hungary was formally abolished. The Soviet military occupation of Hungary, which had persisted since World War II, ended on 19 June 1991.

==== East Germany ====
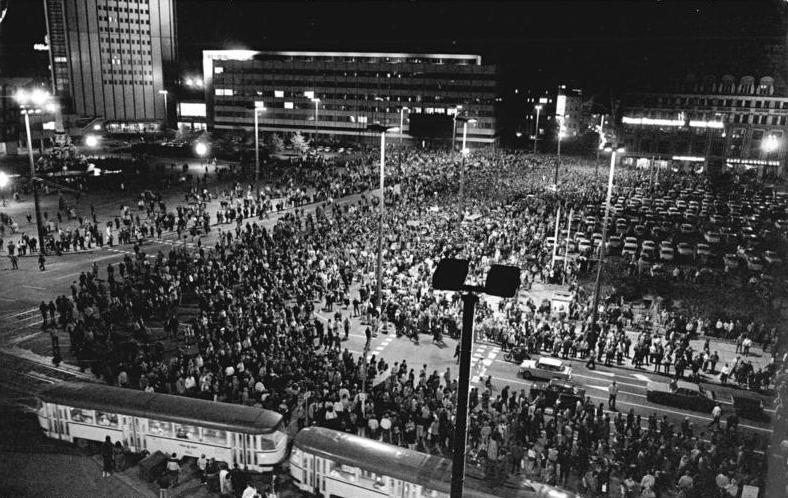
Monday demonstration against the government in Leipzig on 16 October 1989

On 2 May 1989, Hungary started dismantling its barbed-wire border with Austria. The border was still heavily guarded, but it was a political sign. The Pan-European Picnic in August 1989 finally started a movement that could not be stopped by the rulers in the Eastern Bloc. It was the largest escape movement from East Germany since the Berlin Wall was built in 1961. The patrons of the picnic, Otto von Habsburg and the Hungarian Minister of State Imre Pozsgay saw the planned event as an opportunity to test the reaction of Mikhail Gorbachev and the Eastern Bloc countries to a large opening of the border including flight.

After the pan-European picnic, Erich Honecker dictated the Daily Mirror of 19 August 1989: "Habsburg distributed leaflets far into Poland, on which the East German holidaymakers were invited to a picnic. When they came to the picnic, they were given gifts, food, and Deutsche Mark, and then they were persuaded to come to the West." But with the mass exodus at the Pan-European Picnic, the subsequent hesitant behavior of the Socialist Unity Party of East Germany and the non-intervention of the Soviet Union broke the dams. Now tens of thousands of the media-informed East Germans made their way to Hungary, which was no longer ready to keep its borders completely closed or to oblige its border troops to use force of arms.

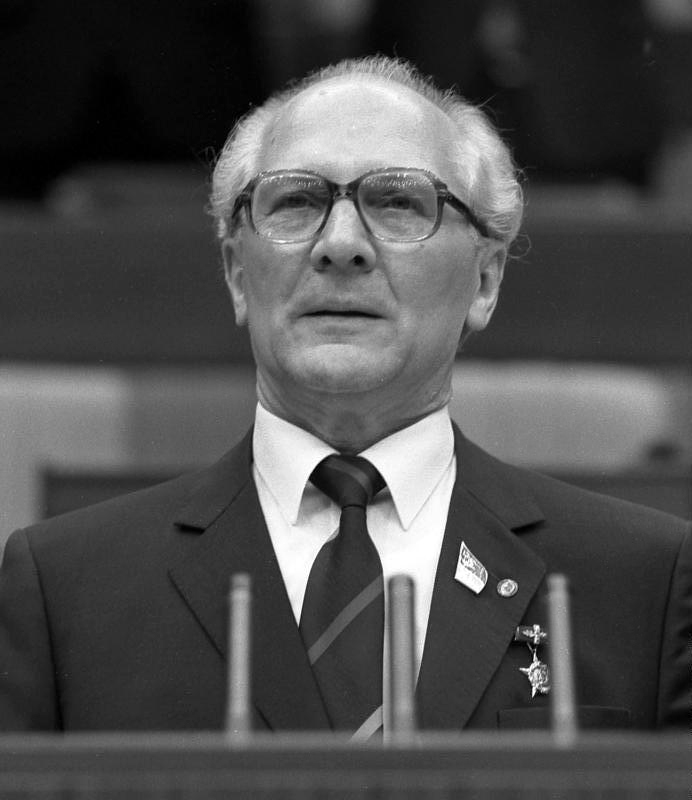
Erich Honecker, East German communist leader

By the end of September 1989, more than 30,000 East Germans had escaped to the West before the GDR denied travel to Hungary, leaving Czechoslovakia as the only neighboring state to which East Germans could escape. Thousands of East Germans tried to reach the West by occupying the West German diplomatic facilities in other Central and Eastern European capitals, notably the Prague Embassy and the Hungarian Embassy, where thousands camped in the muddy garden from August to November waiting for German political reform. The GDR closed the border to Czechoslovakia on 3 October, thereby isolating itself from all its neighbors. Having been shut off from their last chance for escape, an increasing number of East Germans participated in the Monday demonstrations in Leipzig on 4, 11, and 18 September, each attracting 1,200 to 1,500 demonstrators. Many were arrested and beaten, but the people refused to be intimidated. On 25 September, the protests attracted 8,000 demonstrators.

After the fifth successive Monday demonstration in Leipzig on 2 October attracted 10,000 protesters, Honecker issued a shoot and kill order to the military. Communists prepared a huge police, militia, Stasi, and work-combat troop presence, and there were rumors a Tiananmen Square-style massacre was being planned for the following Monday's demonstration on 9 October.

On 6 and 7 October, Mikhail Gorbachev visited East Germany to mark the 40th anniversary of the German Democratic Republic, and urged the East German leadership to accept reform. A famous quote of his is rendered in German as "Wer zu spät kommt, den bestraft das Leben" ("The one who comes too late is punished by life."). However, Honecker remained opposed to internal reform, with his regime going so far as forbidding the circulation of Soviet publications that it viewed as subversive.

In spite of rumors that the communists were planning a massacre on 9 October, 70,000 citizens demonstrated in Leipzig that Monday and the authorities on the ground refused to open fire. The following Monday, 16 October, 120,000 people demonstrated on the streets of Leipzig.

Honecker had hoped that the Soviet troops stationed in the GDR by the Warsaw Pact would restore the communist government and suppress the civilian protests. By 1989, the Soviet government deemed it impractical for the Soviet Union to continue asserting its control over the Eastern Bloc, so it took a neutral stance regarding the events happening in East Germany. Soviet troops stationed in eastern Europe were under strict instructions from the Soviet leadership not to intervene in the political affairs of the Eastern Bloc nations, and remained in their barracks. Faced with ongoing civil unrest, the SED deposed Honecker on 18 October and replaced him with the number-two-man in the regime, Egon Krenz. However, the demonstrations kept growing. On Monday, 23 October, the Leipzig protesters numbered 300,000, and remained as large the following week.

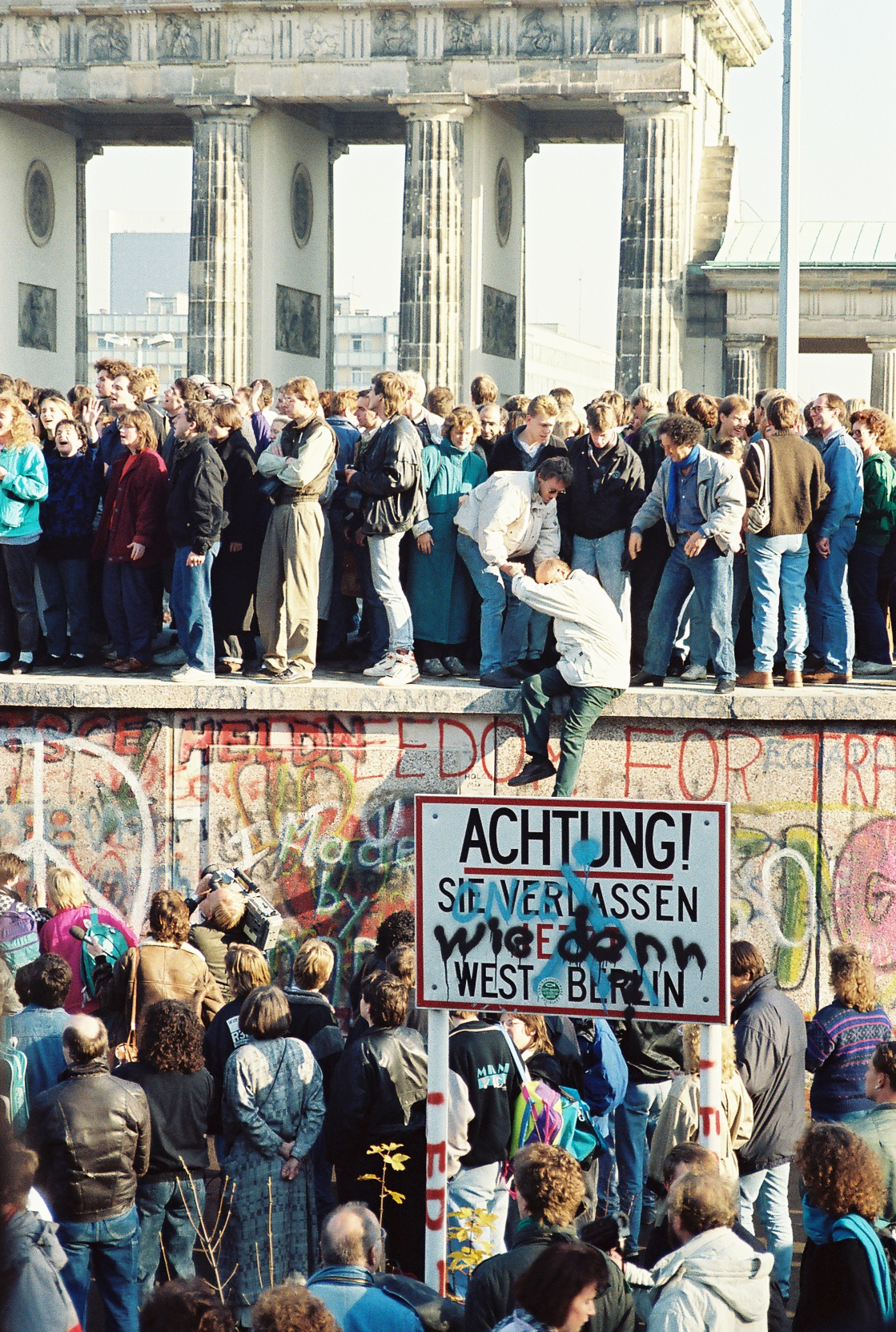
People on the Berlin Wall at the Brandenburg Gate, 10 November 1989

The border to Czechoslovakia was opened again on 1 November, and the Czechoslovak authorities soon let all East Germans travel directly to West Germany without further bureaucratic ado, thus lifting their part of the Iron Curtain on 3 November. On 4 November the authorities decided to authorize a demonstration in Berlin and were faced with the Alexanderplatz demonstration, where half a million citizens converged on the capital demanding freedom in the biggest protest the GDR ever witnessed.

Unable to stem the ensuing flow of refugees to the West through Czechoslovakia, the East German authorities eventually caved in to public pressure by allowing East German citizens to enter West Berlin and West Germany directly, via existing border points, on 9 November 1989, without having properly briefed the border guards. Triggered by the erratic words of regime spokesman Günter Schabowski in a TV press conference, stating that the planned changes were in effect "immediately, without delay," hundreds of thousands of people took advantage of the opportunity.

The guards were quickly overwhelmed by the growing crowds of people demanding to be let out into West Berlin. After receiving no feedback from their superiors, the guards, unwilling to use force, relented and opened the gates to West Berlin. Soon new crossing points were forced open in the Berlin Wall by the people, and sections of the wall were literally torn down. The guards were unaware of what was happening and stood by as the East Germans took to the wall with hammers and chisels.

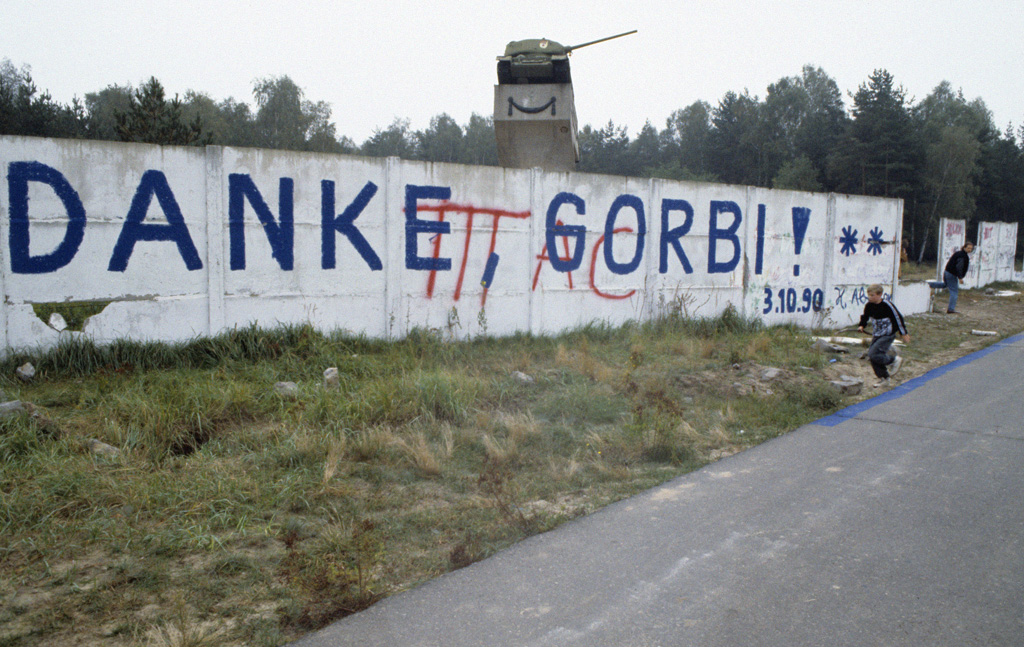
The Berlin Wall, October 1990, saying Thank You, Gorbi

On 7 November, the entire Ministerrat der DDR (State Council of East Germany), including its chairman Willi Stoph, resigned. A new government was formed under a considerably more liberal communist, Hans Modrow. On 1 December, the Volkskammer removed the SED's leading role from the constitution of the GDR. On 3 December Krenz resigned as leader of the SED; he resigned as head of state three days later. On 7 December, Round Table talks opened between the SED and other political parties. On 16 December 1989, the SED was dissolved and refounded as the SED-PDS, abandoning Marxism–Leninism and becoming a mainstream democratic socialist party.

On 15 January 1990, the Stasi's headquarters was stormed by protesters. Modrow became the de facto leader of East Germany until free elections were held on 18 March 1990—the first since November 1932. The SED, renamed the Party of Democratic Socialism, was heavily defeated. Lothar de Maizière of the East German Christian Democratic Union became prime minister on 4 April 1990 on a platform of speedy reunification with the West.

On 12 September 1990, a peace treaty was signed between the two countries of Germany and the four Allies, to replace the Potsdam Agreement of 1 August 1945 after World War II to return full sovereignty to Germany, which facilitated the reunification. The two German countries were reunified into present-day Germany on 3 October 1990, solving the German problem of two states status, which had existed since 7 October 1949.

The Kremlin's willingness to abandon such a strategically vital ally marked a dramatic change by the Soviet superpower and a fundamental paradigm shift in international relations, which until 1989 had been dominated by the East–West divide running through Berlin itself. The last Russian troops left the territory of the former GDR, now part of a reunited Germany, on 1 September 1994.

==== Czechoslovakia ====
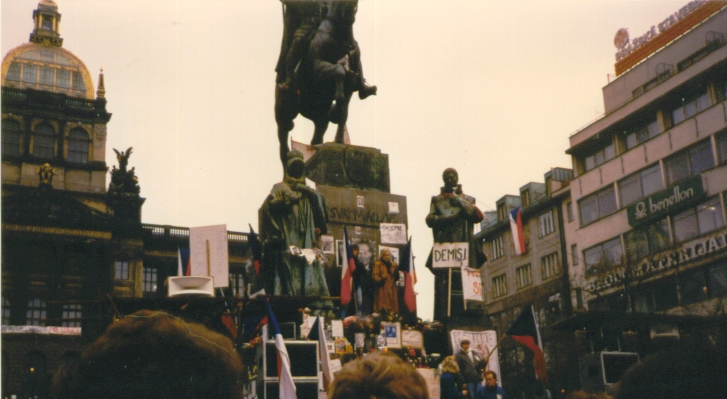
Protests beneath the monument in Wenceslas Square, in Prague

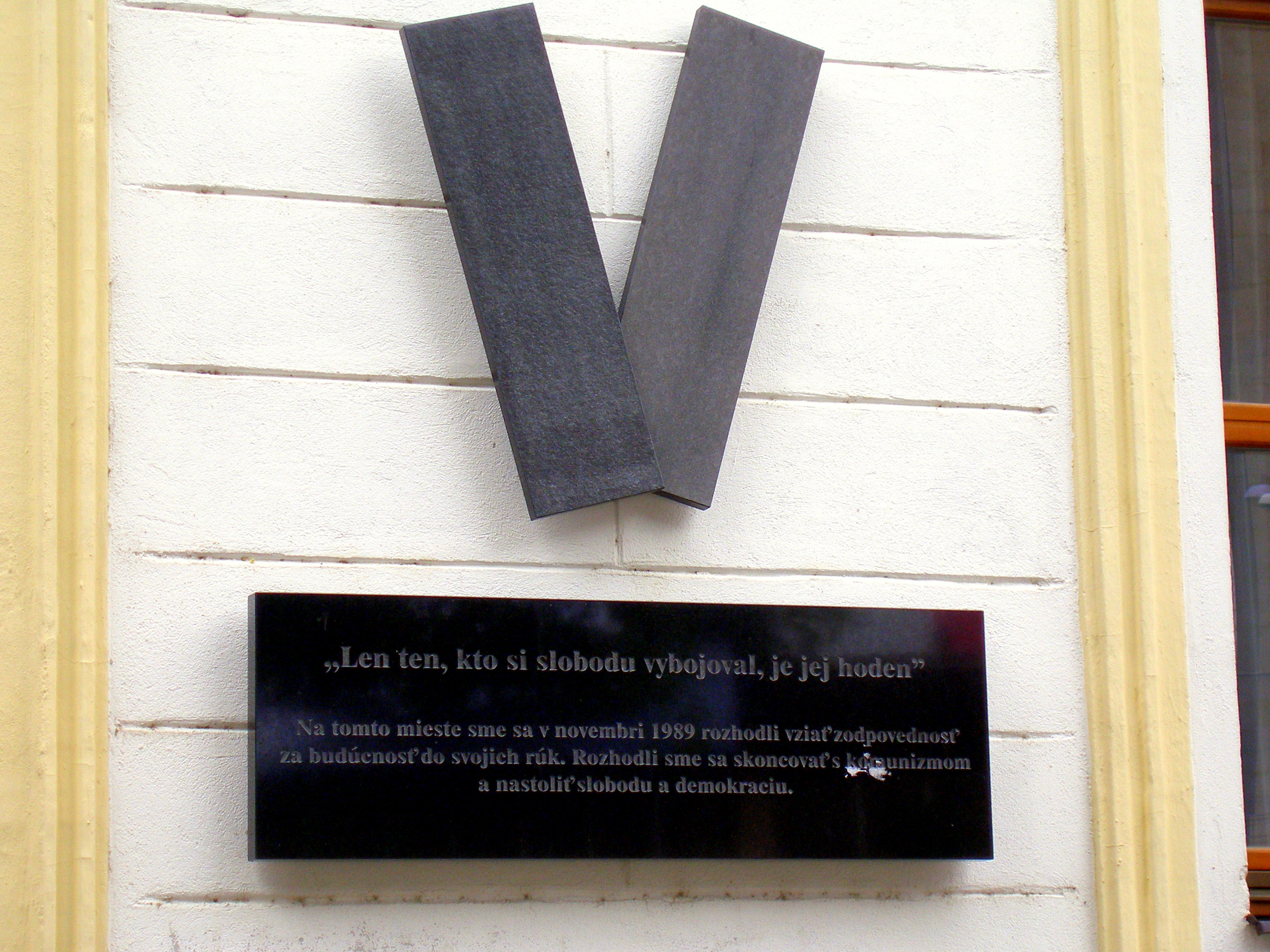
A memorial to the Velvet Revolution in Bratislava (Námestie SNP), Slovakia

The "Velvet Revolution" was a non-violent transition of power in Czechoslovakia from the communist government to a parliamentary republic. On 17 November 1989, riot police suppressed a peaceful student demonstration in Prague, a day after a similar demonstration passed without incident in Bratislava. Although controversy continues over whether anyone died that night, that event sparked a series of popular demonstrations from 19 November to late December. By 20 November the number of peaceful protesters assembled in Prague had swelled from 200,000 the previous day to an estimated half-million. Five days later, the Letná Square protest held 800,000 people. On 24 November, the entire Communist Party leadership, including general secretary Miloš Jakeš, resigned. A two-hour general strike, involving all citizens of Czechoslovakia, was successfully held on 27 November.

With the collapse of other communist governments, and increasing street protests, the Communist Party of Czechoslovakia announced on 28 November 1989 that it would relinquish power and dismantle the single-party state. Barbed wire and other obstructions were removed from the border with West Germany and Austria in early December. On 10 December, President Gustáv Husák appointed the first largely non-communist government in Czechoslovakia since 1948 and resigned. Alexander Dubček was elected speaker of the federal parliament on 28 December and Václav Havel the president of Czechoslovakia on 29 December 1989. In June 1990 Czechoslovakia held its first democratic elections since 1946. On 27 June 1991 the last Soviet troops were withdrawn from Czechoslovakia.

==== Bulgaria ====
In October and November 1989, demonstrations on ecological issues were staged in Sofia, where demands for political reform were also voiced. The demonstrations were suppressed, but on 10 November 1989, the day after the Berlin Wall was breached, Bulgaria's long-serving leader Todor Zhivkov was ousted by his Politburo. He was succeeded by a considerably more liberal communist, former foreign minister Petar Mladenov. Moscow apparently approved the leadership change, as Zhivkov had been opposed to Gorbachev's policies. The new regime immediately repealed restrictions on free speech and assembly, which led to the first mass demonstration on 17 November, as well as the formation of anti-communist movements. Nine of them united as the Union of Democratic Forces (UDF) on 7 December. The UDF was not satisfied with Zhivkov's ouster, and demanded additional democratic reforms, most importantly the removal of the constitutionally mandated leading role of the Bulgarian Communist Party.

Mladenov announced on 11 December 1989 that the Communist Party would abandon its monopoly on power, and that multiparty elections would be held the following year. In February 1990, the Bulgarian legislature deleted the portion of the constitution about the "leading role" of the Communist Party. Eventually, it was decided that a round table on the Polish model would be held in 1990 and elections held by June 1990. The round table took place from 3 January to 14 May 1990, at which an agreement was reached on the transition to democracy. The Communist Party abandoned Marxism–Leninism on 3 April 1990 and renamed itself as the Bulgarian Socialist Party. In June 1990 the first free elections since 1931 were held, won by the Bulgarian Socialist Party.

==== Romania ====
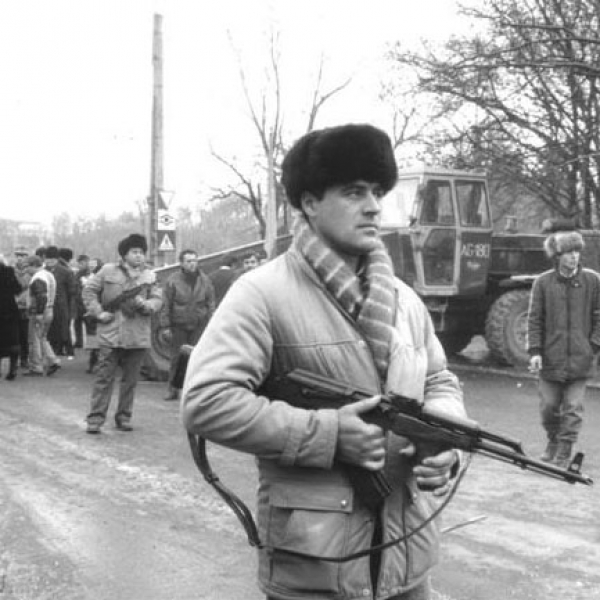
Armed civilians during the Romanian Revolution. The revolution was the only violent overthrow of a communist state in the Warsaw Pact.

Czechoslovak President Gustáv Husák's resignation on 10 December 1989 amounted to the fall of the communist regime in Czechoslovakia, leaving Ceaușescu's Romania as the only remaining hard-line communist regime in the Warsaw Pact.

After having suppressed the Brașov rebellion in 1987, Nicolae Ceaușescu was re-elected for another five years as leader of the Romanian Communist Party (PCR) in November 1989, signalling that he intended to ride out the anti-communist uprisings sweeping the rest of Europe. As Ceaușescu prepared to go on a state visit to Iran, his Securitate ordered the arrest and exile of a local Hungarian Calvinist minister, László Tőkés, on 16 December, for sermons offending the regime. Tőkés was seized, but only after serious rioting erupted. Timișoara was the first city to react on 16 December and civil unrest continued for five days.

Returning from Iran, Ceaușescu ordered a mass rally in his support outside Communist Party headquarters in Bucharest on 21 December. To his shock, the crowd booed and jeered him as he spoke. Years of repressed dissatisfaction boiled to the surface throughout the Romanian populace and even among elements in Ceaușescu's own government, and the demonstrations spread throughout the country.

At first, the security forces obeyed Ceaușescu's orders to shoot protesters. On the morning of 22 December, the Romanian military suddenly changed sides. This came after it was announced that defense minister Vasile Milea had committed suicide after being unmasked as a traitor. It was suggested that he only tried to incapacitate himself in order to be relieved from office, but the bullet hit an artery and he died soon afterwards. Believing Milea had actually been murdered, the rank-and-file soldiers went over virtually en masse to the revolution. Army tanks began moving towards the Central Committee building, with crowds swarming alongside them. The rioters forced open the doors of the Central Committee building in an attempt to capture Ceaușescu and his wife, Elena, coming within a few meters of the couple. They managed to escape via a helicopter waiting for them on the roof of the building.

Although elation followed the flight of the Ceaușescus, uncertainty surrounded their fate. On Christmas Day, Romanian television showed the Ceaușescus facing a hasty trial, and then being executed by firing squad. An interim National Salvation Front Council led by Ion Iliescu took over and announced elections for April 1990, the first free elections held in Romania since 1937. These were postponed until 20 May 1990. The Romanian Revolution was the bloodiest of the revolutions of 1989: over 1,000 people died, one hundred of which were children, the youngest only one month old.

Unlike its kindred parties in the Warsaw Pact, the PCR simply melted away. No present-day Romanian party claiming to be its successor has ever been elected to the legislature since the change of system. However, former PCR members have played significant roles in post-1989 Romanian politics. Every Romanian President until the election of Klaus Iohannis in 2014 was a former Communist Party member.

The years following the disposal of Ceaușescu were not free of conflict, and a series of "Mineriads" organized by dissatisfied Jiu Valley miners occurred. The June 1990 Mineriad turned deadly after university students, the "Golaniads", held a months long protest against the participation of ex-PCR and Securitate members in the 1990 Romanian general election. President Ion Iliescu branded the protesters "hooligans" and called the miners to "defend Romanian democracy". Viorel Ene, president of the Association of Victims of the Mineriads, asserted that:

There are documents, testimonies of doctors, of people from Domnești and Străulești cemeteries. Although we have said all along that the real number of dead is over 100, no one contradicted so far and there was no official position against.

Over 10,000 miners were transported to Bucharest and in the ensuing clashes, seven protesters died and hundreds more were injured, although media estimates on the casualty figures were much higher. The opposition newspaper România Liberă alleged that over 128 unidentified bodies were buried in a common grave in Străulești II cemetery, near Bucharest. A few weeks after the mineriad, several medical students conducted research in Străulești II cemetery, discovering two trenches with about 78 unmarked graves, which they claimed to contain victims of the events.

==== Yugoslavia ====
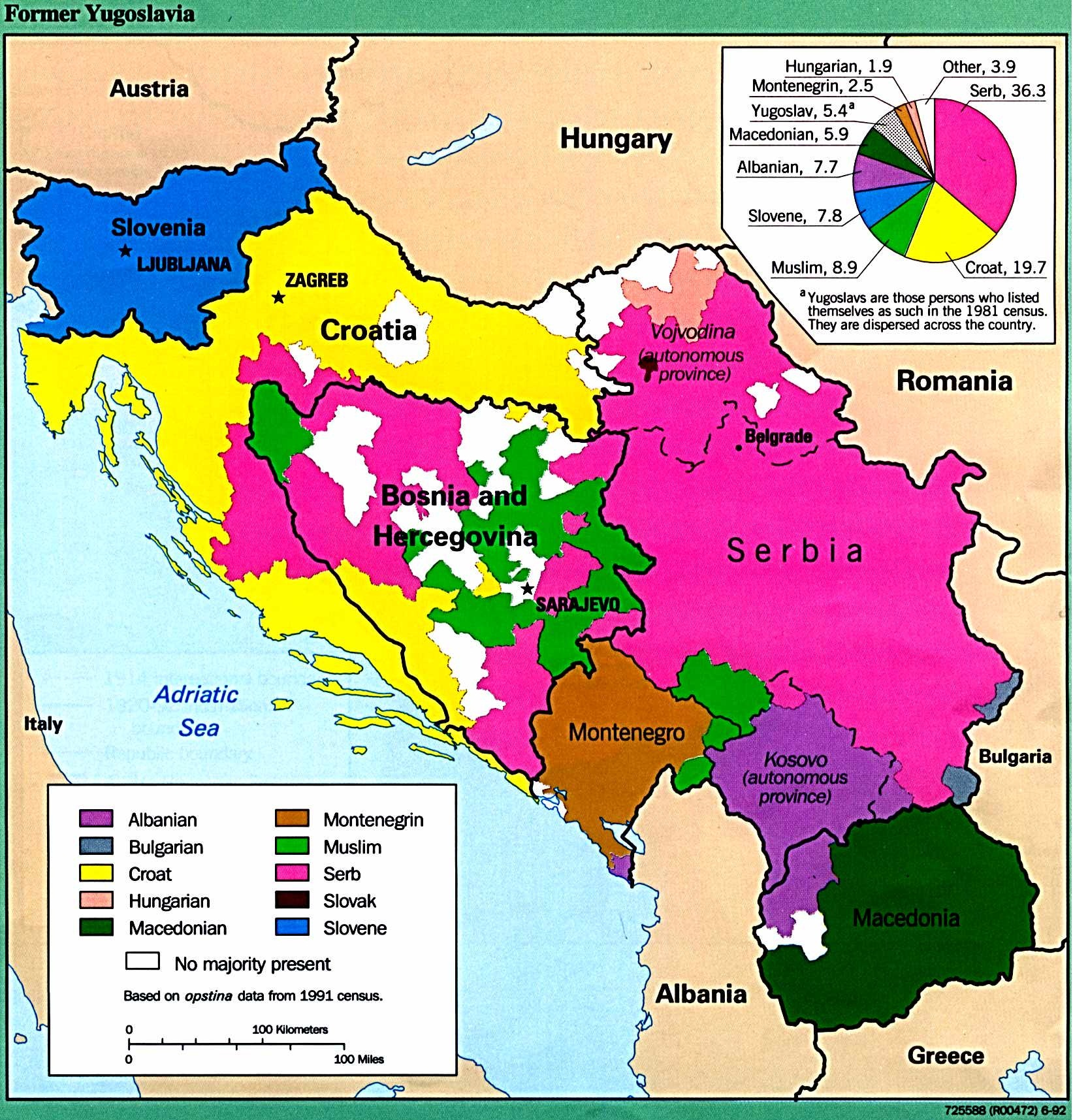
Ethnic groups in Yugoslavia in 1991

The Socialist Federal Republic of Yugoslavia was not a part of the Warsaw Pact but pursued its own version of communism under Josip Broz Tito. It was a multi-ethnic state which Tito was able to maintain through a Yugoslav patriotic doctrine of "Brotherhood and unity". Tensions between ethnicities began to escalate with the Croatian Spring of 1970–71, a movement for greater Croatian autonomy, which was suppressed. Constitutional changes were instituted in 1974, and the 1974 Yugoslav Constitution devolved some federal powers to the constituent republics and provinces. After Tito's death in 1980 ethnic tensions grew, first in Albanian-majority SAP Kosovo with the 1981 protests in Kosovo.

Parallel to the same process, Slovenia initiated a policy of gradual liberalization in 1984, somewhat similar to the Soviet Perestroika. This provoked tensions between the League of Communists of Slovenia and the central Yugoslav Party and federal army. In 1984, the decade long ban to build the Saint Sava Cathedral in Belgrade was lifted. The backdown of the communist elite and a popular gathering of 100,000 believers on 12 May 1985 to celebrate liturgy inside the walls of the ruins marked the return of religion in postwar Yugoslavia. By the late 1980s, many civil society groups were pushing towards democratization, while widening the space for cultural plurality.

In 1987 and 1988, a series of clashes between the emerging civil society and the communist regime culminated with the so-called Slovene Spring, a mass movement for democratic reforms. The Committee for the Defence of Human Rights was established as the platform of all major non-Communist political movements. By early 1989, several anti-communist political parties were already openly functioning, challenging the hegemony of the Slovenian Communists. Soon, the Slovenian Communists, pressured by their own civil society, came into conflict with the Serbian Communist leadership.

In January 1990, an extraordinary Congress of the League of Communists of Yugoslavia was called in order to settle the disputes among its constituent parties. Faced with being completely outnumbered, the Slovenian and Croatian communists walked out of the Congress on 23 January 1990, effectively bringing to an end to Yugoslavia's communist party. Both parties of the two western republics negotiated free multi-party elections with their own opposition movements.

On 8 April 1990, the democratic and anti-Yugoslav DEMOS coalition won the elections in Slovenia, while on 22 April 1990 the Croatian elections resulted in a landslide victory for the nationalist Croatian Democratic Union (HDZ) led by Franjo Tuđman. The results were much more balanced in Bosnia and Herzegovina and in Macedonia in November 1990, while the parliamentary and presidential elections of December 1990 in Serbia and Montenegro consolidated the power of Milošević and his supporters. Free elections on the level of the federation were never carried out.

The Slovenian and Croatian leaderships started preparing plans for secession from the federation, while a part of the Serbs of Croatia started the so-called Log Revolution, an insurrection organized by Serbia that would lead to the creation of the breakaway region of SAO Krajina. In the Slovenian independence referendum on 23 December 1990, 88.5% of residents voted for independence. In the Croatian independence referendum on 19 May 1991, 93.24% voted for independence.

The escalating ethnic and national tensions were exacerbated by the drive for independence and led to the following Yugoslav wars:

- War in Slovenia (1991)
- Croatian War of Independence (1991–1995)
- Bosnian War (1992–1995)
- Kosovo War (1998–1999), including the NATO bombing of Yugoslavia.

The insurgency in the Preševo Valley (1999–2001) and the insurgency in the Republic of Macedonia (2001) are often discussed in the same context.

==== Albania ====
Enver Hoxha, who had led Albania for four decades prior, died on 11 April 1985. His successor, Ramiz Alia, began to gradually open up the regime from above. In 1989, the first revolts started in Shkodra and subsequently spread to other cities. Eventually, the regime initiated some liberalization policies, including measures in 1990 granting citizens the freedom to travel abroad. Efforts were also started to improve ties with other countries. The March 1991 elections—the first free elections in Albania since 1923, and only the third free elections in the country's history—left the communists in power, but a general strike and urban opposition led to the formation of a coalition cabinet including non-communists. Parliamentary elections were held in Albania on 22 March 1992, with a second round of voting for eleven seats on 29 March, amid economic collapse and social unrest.

==== Mongolia ====
Mongolia (Outer Mongolia) declared independence from China in 1911 during the fall of the Qing dynasty. The Mongolian People's Party took power in 1921, and the party renamed itself the Mongolian People's Revolutionary Party. During these years, Mongolia was closely aligned with the Soviet Union. After Yumjaagiin Tsedenbal left in 1984, the new leadership under Jambyn Batmönkh implemented economic reforms, but failed to appeal to those who, in late 1989, wanted broader changes.

The "Mongolian Revolution" was a democratic, peaceful revolution that started with demonstrations and hunger strikes and ended 70-years of Marxism-Leninism and eventually moved towards democracy. It was spearheaded by mostly younger people demonstrating on Sükhbaatar Square in the capital Ulaanbaatar. It ended with the authoritarian government resigning without bloodshed. Some of the main organizers were Tsakhiagiin Elbegdorj, Sanjaasürengiin Zorig, Erdeniin Bat-Üül, and Bat-Erdeniin Batbayar.

During the morning of 10 December 1989, the first public demonstration occurred in front of the Youth Cultural Center in the capital of Ulaanbaatar. There, Elbegdorj announced the creation of the Mongolian Democratic Union, and the first pro-democracy movement in Mongolia began. The protesters called for Mongolia to adopt perestroika and glasnost. Dissident leaders demanded free elections and economic reform, but within the context of a "human democratic socialism". The protesters injected a nationalist element into the protests by using traditional Mongolian script—which most Mongolians could not read—as a symbolic repudiation of the political system which had imposed the Mongolian Cyrillic alphabet.

In late December 1989, demonstrations increased when news came of Garry Kasparov's interview in Playboy, suggesting that the Soviet Union could improve its economic health by selling Mongolia to China. On 14 January 1990, the protesters, having grown from three hundred to some 1,000, met in a square in front of Lenin Museum in Ulaanbaatar, which has been named Freedom Square since then. A demonstration in Sükhbaatar Square on 21 January followed, in weather of −30 C. Protesters carried banners alluding to Chinggis Khaan (Genghis Khan), rehabilitating a figure whom Soviet schooling neglected to praise.

In subsequent months of 1990, activists continued to organize demonstrations, rallies, protests and hunger strikes, as well as teachers' and workers' strikes. Activists had growing support from Mongolians, both in the capital and the countryside and the union's activities led to other calls for democracy all over the country. After numerous demonstrations of many thousands of people in the capital city as well as provincial centers, on 4 March 1990, the MDU and three other reform organizations held a joint outdoor mass meeting, inviting the government to attend. The government sent no representative to what became a demonstration of over 100,000 people demanding democratic change. This culminated with Jambyn Batmönkh, chairman of Politburo of MPRP's Central Committee decided to dissolve the Politburo and to resign on 9 March 1990.

Mongolia's first free, multi-party elections for a bicameral parliament took place on 29 July 1990. Parties ran for 430 seats in the Great Hural. Opposition parties were not able to nominate enough candidates. The opposition nominated 346 candidates for the 430 seats in the Great Hural (upper house). The Mongolian People's Revolutionary Party (MPRP) won 357 seats in the Great Hural and 31 out of 53 seats in the Small Hural. The MPRP enjoyed a strong position in the countryside. The State Great Khural first met on 3 September 1990 and elected a president (MPRP), vice president (Social Democrat) who was also a chairman of the Baga Hural, prime minister (MPRP), and 50 members to the Baga Hural (lower house).

In November 1991, the People's Great Hural began a discussion on a new constitution, which entered into force on 12 February 1992. The new constitution restructured the legislative branch of government, creating a unicameral legislature, the State Great Hural (SGH). The MPRP retained its majority but lost the 1996 elections. The final Russian troops, which had been stationed in Mongolia since 1966, fully withdrew in December 1992.

==== China ====
While China did not undergo a revolution resulting in a new form of government in 1989, a popular national movement led to large demonstrations in favor of democratic reforms. Chinese leader Deng Xiaoping had developed the concept of socialism with Chinese characteristics and enacted local market economy reforms around 1984, but the policy had stalled.

The first Chinese student demonstrations, which eventually led to the Beijing protests of 1989, took place in December 1986 in Hefei. The students called for campus elections, the chance to study abroad, and greater availability of Western pop culture. Their protests took advantage of the loosening political atmosphere and included rallies against the slow pace of reform. Hu Yaobang, a protégé of Deng Xiaoping and a leading advocate of reform, was blamed for the protests and forced to resign as the CCP general secretary in January 1987. In the "Anti Bourgeois Liberalization Campaign", Hu would be further denounced.

The Tiananmen Square protests were sparked by the death of Hu Yaobang on 15 April 1989. By the eve of Hu's state funeral, some 100,000 students had gathered at Tiananmen Square to observe it; however, no leaders emerged from the Great Hall. The movement lasted for seven weeks.

Mikhail Gorbachev visited China on 15 May during the protests, bringing many foreign news agencies to Beijing, and their sympathetic portrayals of the protesters helped galvanize a spirit of liberation among the Central, South-East and Eastern Europeans who were watching. The Chinese leadership, particularly Communist Party general secretary Zhao Ziyang, who had begun to radically reform the economy earlier than the Soviets, was open to political reform, but not at the cost of a potential return to the disorder of the Cultural Revolution.

The movement lasted from Hu's death on 15 April until tanks and troops rolled into Beijing to suppress the protests in the late night and early morning hours of 3–4 June 1989. In Beijing, the military response to the protest by the PRC government left many civilians in charge of clearing the square of the dead and severely injured. The exact number of casualties is not known and many different estimates exist. The event, however, did lead to some political change.. In the ensuing years, the PRC continued its economic liberalization under Reform and Opening Up after Deng Xiaoping's southern tour, but the regime has staunchly refused to loosen its political grip on power.

=== Malta summit ===
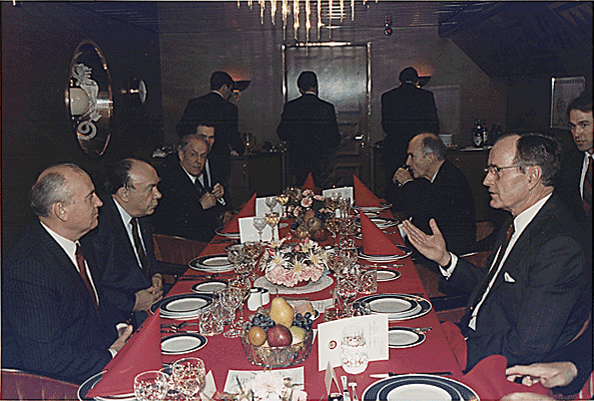
Mikhail Gorbachev and President George H. W. Bush on board the Soviet cruise ship Maxim Gorky, Marsaxlokk Harbour, December 1989

The Malta Summit took place between U.S. President George H. W. Bush and U.S.S.R. leader Mikhail Gorbachev on 2–3 December 1989, just a few weeks after the fall of the Berlin Wall, a meeting which contributed to the end of the Cold War partially as a result of the broader pro-democracy movement. It was their second meeting following a meeting that included then President Ronald Reagan, in New York in December 1988. News reports of the time referred to the Malta Summit as the most important since 1945, when British prime minister Winston Churchill, Soviet premier Joseph Stalin and U.S. President Franklin D. Roosevelt agreed on a post-war plan for Europe at the Yalta Conference.

=== Election chronology in Central and Eastern Europe, and Central Asia ===
Between June 1989 and April 1991, every communist or former communist country in Central and Eastern Europe and Central Asia—and in the case of the USSR and Yugoslavia, every constituent republic—held competitive parliamentary elections for the first time in many decades. Some elections were only partly free, while others were fully democratic. The chronology below gives the details of these historic elections, and the dates are the first day of voting as several elections were split over several days for run-off contests:

- Poland – 4 June 1989
- Turkmenistan – 7 January 1990
- Uzbekistan – 18 February 1990
- Lithuania – 24 February 1990
- Moldavia – 25 February 1990
- Kirghizia – 25 February 1990
- Tajikistan – 25 February 1990
- Byelorussia – 4 March 1990
- Russia – 4 March 1990
- Ukraine – 4 March 1990
- East Germany – 18 March 1990
- Estonia – 18 March 1990
- Latvia – 18 March 1990
- Hungary – 25 March 1990
- Kazakhstan – 25 March 1990
- Slovenia – 8 April 1990
- Croatia – 22 April 1990
- Romania – 20 May 1990
- Armenia – 20 May 1990
- Czechoslovakia – 8 June 1990
- Bulgaria – 10 June 1990
- Mongolia – 22 June 1990
- Azerbaijan – 30 September 1990
- Georgia – 28 October 1990
- Macedonia – 11 November 1990
- Bosnia and Herzegovina – 18 November 1990
- Serbia – 9 December 1990
- Montenegro – 9 December 1990
- Albania – 31 March 1991

=== Dissolution of the Soviet Union ===
On 1 July 1991, the Warsaw Pact was officially dissolved at a meeting in Prague. At a summit later that same month, Gorbachev and Bush declared a US–Soviet strategic partnership, decisively marking the end of the Cold War. President Bush declared that US–Soviet cooperation during the 1990–1991 Gulf War had laid the groundwork for a partnership in resolving bilateral and world problems.

As the Soviet Union rapidly withdrew its forces from Central and Southeast Europe, the spillover from the 1989 upheavals began reverberating throughout the Soviet Union itself. Agitation for self-determination led to first Lithuania, and then Estonia, Latvia, and Armenia declaring independence. However, the Soviet central government demanded the revocation of the declarations and threatened military action and economic sanctions. The government even went as far as controversially sending Soviet Army troops to the streets of the Lithuanian capital, Vilnius, to suppress the separatist movements in January 1991, causing the deaths of 14 persons.

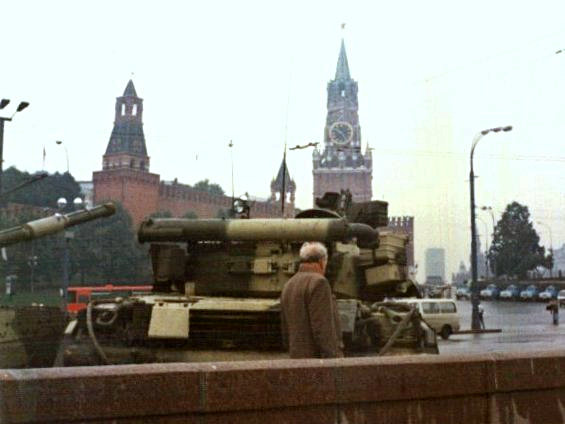
Tanks in Moscow's Red Square during the 1991 coup attempt

Disaffection in other Soviet republics, such as Georgia and Azerbaijan, was countered by promises of greater decentralization. More open elections led to the election of candidates opposed to Communist Party rule.

Glasnost had inadvertently released the long-suppressed national sentiments of all peoples within the borders of the multinational Soviet state. These nationalist movements were further strengthened by the rapid deterioration of the Soviet economy, whose foundations were exposed with the removal of communist discipline. Gorbachev's reforms had failed to improve the economy, with the old Soviet command structure completely breaking down. One by one, the constituent republics created their own economic systems and voted to subordinate Soviet laws to local laws.

In 1990, the Communist Party was forced to surrender its seven-decade monopoly of political power when the Supreme Soviet rescinded the clause in the Soviet Constitution that guaranteed its sole authority to rule. Gorbachev's policies caused the Communist Party to lose its control over the media. Details of the Soviet Union's past were quickly being declassified. This caused many to distrust the 'old system' and push for greater autonomy and independence.

After the March 1991 referendum confirmed the preservation of the Soviet Union but in a looser form, a group of Soviet hard-liners represented by Vice-President Gennadi Yanayev launched a coup attempting to overthrow Gorbachev in August 1991. Boris Yeltsin, then president of the Russian SFSR, rallied the people and much of the army against the coup and the effort collapsed. Although restored to power, Gorbachev's authority had been irreparably undermined. Gorbachev resigned as General Secretary of the Communist Party following the coup, and the Supreme Soviet dissolved the Party and banned all communist activity on Soviet soil. Just a few weeks later, the government granted the Baltic states their independence on 6 September.

Over the next three months, one republic after another declared independence, mostly out of fear of another coup. Also during this time, the Soviet government was rendered useless as the new Russian government began taking over what remained of it, including the Kremlin. The penultimate step came on 1 December, when voters in the second most powerful republic, Ukraine, overwhelmingly voted to secede from the Soviet Union in a referendum. This ended any realistic chance of keeping the Soviet Union together. On 8 December, Yeltsin met with his counterparts from Ukraine and Belarus and signed the Belavezha Accords, declaring that the Soviet Union had ceased to exist. Gorbachev denounced this as illegal, but he had long since lost any ability to influence events outside of Moscow.

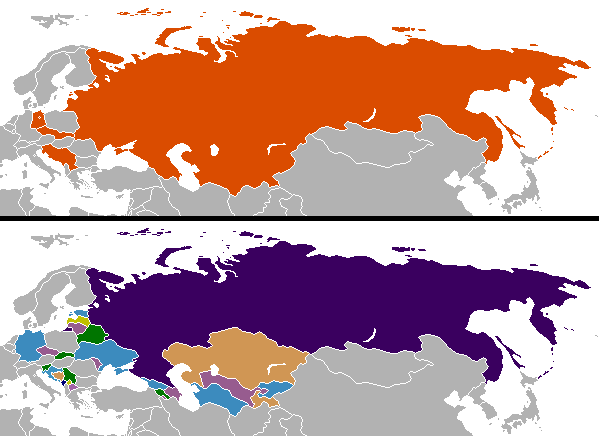
Changes in national boundaries after the end of the Cold War

Two weeks later, 11 of the remaining 12 republics—all except Georgia—signed the Alma-Ata Protocol, which confirmed the Soviet Union had been effectively dissolved and replaced by a new voluntary association, the Commonwealth of Independent States. Bowing to the inevitable, Gorbachev resigned as Soviet president on 25 December, and the Supreme Soviet ratified the Belavezha Accords the next day, legally dissolving itself and the Soviet Union as a political entity. By the end of 1991, the few Soviet institutions that hadn't been taken over by Russia had dissolved. The Soviet Union was officially disbanded, breaking up into fifteen constituent parts, thereby ending the world's largest and most influential Socialist state, and leaving to China that position. In 1993, a constitutional crisis dissolved into violence in Moscow as the Russian Armed Forces were called in to reestablish order.

==== Baltic states ====
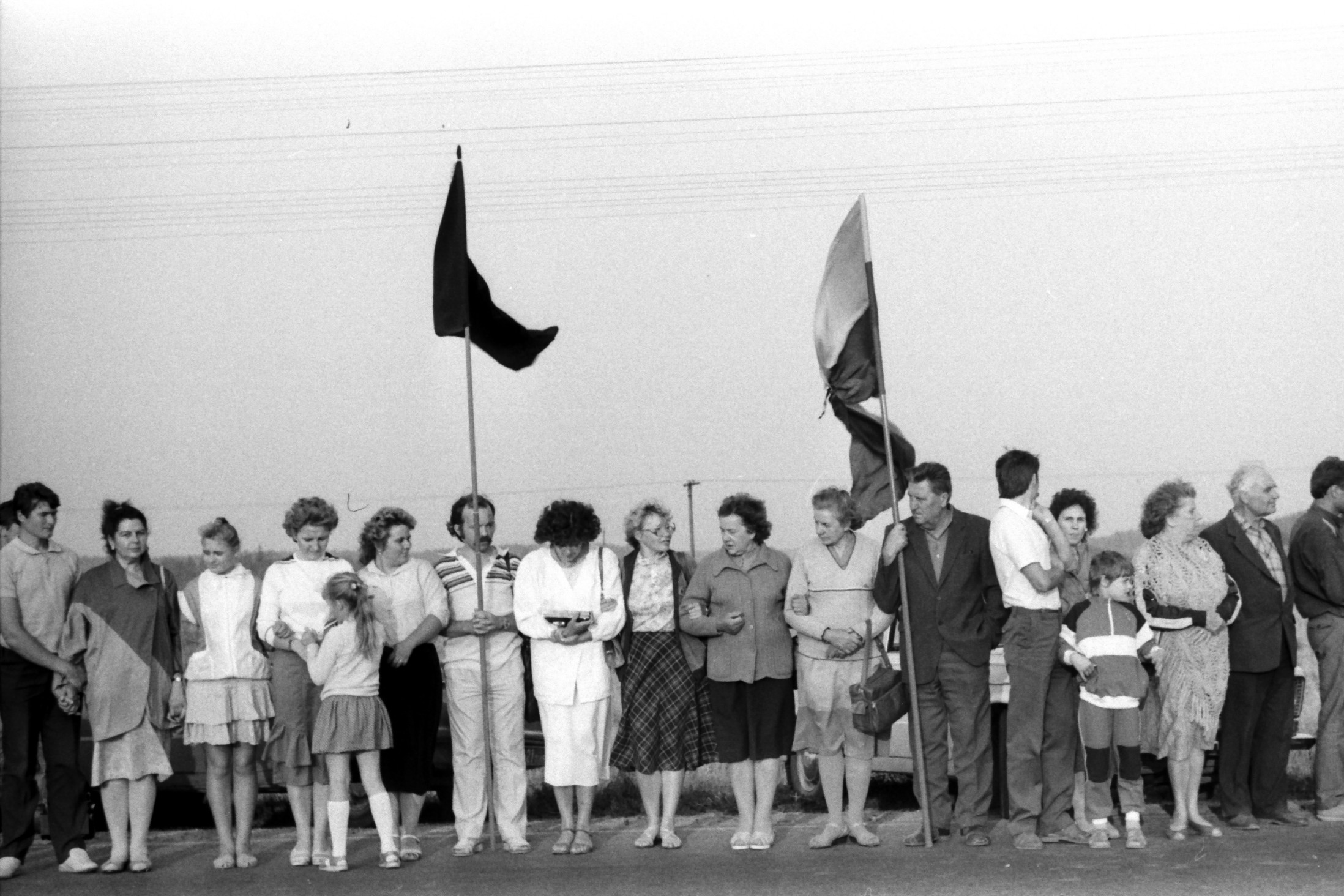
The Baltic Way was a human chain of approximately two million people demanding independence of the Baltic states from the Soviet Union.

Estonia, Latvia and Lithuania implemented democratic reforms and achieved independence from the Soviet Union. The Singing Revolution is a commonly used name for events between 1987 and 1991 that led to the restoration of the independence of Estonia, Latvia and Lithuania. The term was coined by an Estonian activist and artist, Heinz Valk, in an article published a week after 10–11 June 1988 spontaneous mass night-singing demonstrations at the Tallinn Song Festival Grounds. Estonia declared its sovereignty from the Soviet Union on 16 November 1988. Lithuania followed on 18 May 1989 and Latvia on 28 July 1989.

Lithuania declared full independence on 11 March 1990 and on 30 March, Estonia announced the start of a transitional period to independence, followed by Latvia on 4 May. These declarations were met with force from the Soviet Union in early 1991, in confrontations known as the "January Events" in Lithuania and "The Barricades" in Latvia. The Baltic states contended that their incorporation into the Soviet Union had been illegal under both international law and their own law, and they were reasserting an independence that still legally existed.

Soon after the launching of the August coup, Estonia and Latvia declared full independence. By the time the coup failed, the USSR was no longer unified enough to mount a forceful resistance, and it recognized the independence of the Baltic states on 6 September 1991.

==== Belarus, Ukraine and Moldova ====
- Belarus declared full independence from the USSR on 25 August 1991. The main political changes of the early 1990s were driven by the Belarusian Popular Front and its fraction in the Supreme Soviet of Belarus. A few years later, a new post-communist leader, Alexander Lukashenko, obtained power. After a short period, he increased his power as a result of two controversial referendums (1995–96) and has been criticized for repressing political opposition ever since.
- Moldova participated in the War of Transnistria between Moldova and Russian-connected forces in the separatist region of Transnistria. Communists came back to power in a 2001 election under Vladimir Voronin, but faced civil unrest in 2009 over accusations of rigged elections.
- Ukraine had restored its independence in August 1991, after it lost its independence, as the short-lived Ukrainian People's Republic, in 1919. Presidencies of former communists Leonid Kravchuk and Leonid Kuchma were followed by the Orange Revolution in 2004, in which Ukrainians elected Viktor Yushchenko (also a former member of CPSU). Kyiv, the Ukrainian capital, was the focal point of the movement's campaign of civil resistance, with thousands of protesters demonstrating daily.

==== Transcaucasia ====
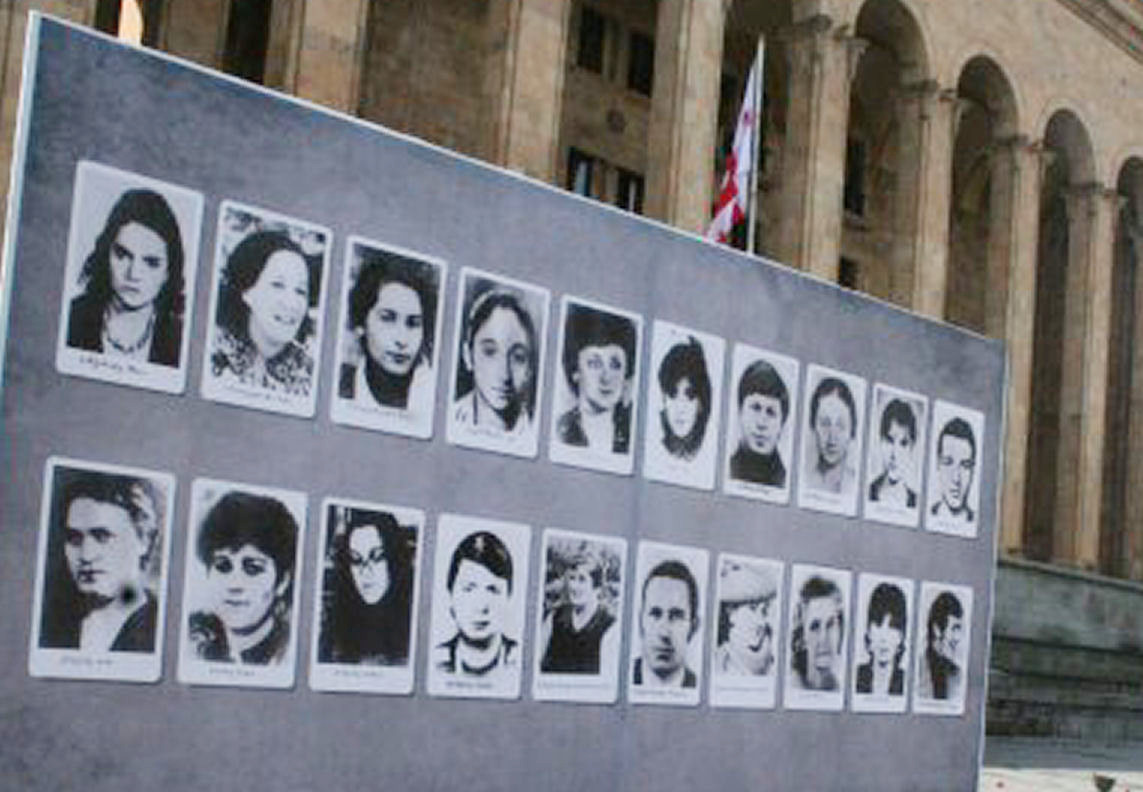
Photos of 9 April 1989 victims of the Tbilisi massacre on a billboard in Tbilisi

Following Georgia's declaration of independence in 1991, South Ossetia and Abkhazia declared their desire to leave Georgia and remain part of the Soviet Union/Russia.

All countries in the region regained their independence in 1991 following the takeover by the Red Army in 1920–21.

- Georgia and the North Caucasus have been marred by ethnic and sectarian violence since the collapse of the USSR. In April 1989 the Soviet Army massacred demonstrators in Tbilisi. In November 1989, the Georgian SSR officially condemned the Red Army invasion of Georgia. Democracy activist Zviad Gamsakhurdia served as president from 1991 to 1992. Russia aided break-away republics in wars in South Ossetia and Abkhazia during the early 1990s, conflicts that have periodically reemerged, and Russia has accused Georgia of supporting Chechen rebels during the Chechen wars. A coup d'état installed former communist leader Eduard Shevardnadze as President of Georgia until the Rose Revolution in 2003.
- Armenia's independence struggle included violence as the First Nagorno-Karabakh War was fought between Armenia and Azerbaijan. Armenia became increasingly militarized, with the ascendancy of Kocharian, a former president of Nagorno-Karabakh, often viewed as a milestone. Elections have since been increasingly controversial, and government corruption became rifer. After Kocharyan, notably, Serzh Sargsyan ascended to power. Sargsyan is often noted as the "founder of the Armenian and Karabakh militaries" and was, in the past, defense minister and national security minister.
- Azerbaijan's Popular Front Party won the first elections with the self-described pro-Western, populist nationalist Elchibey. However, Elchibey planned to end Moscow's advantage in the harvesting of Azeri oil and build much stronger links with Turkey and Europe, and as a result was overthrown by former communists in a coup backed by Russia and Iran, which viewed the new country as a compelling threat, with territorial ambitions within Iranian borders and also being a strong economic rival. Mutallibov rose to power, but he was soon destabilized and eventually ousted due to popular frustration with his perceived incompetence, corruption and improper handling of the war with Armenia. Azerbaijani KGB and Azerbaijani SSR leader Heydar Aliyev captured power and remained president until he transferred the presidency to his son in 2003. The First Nagorno-Karabakh War was fought between Armenia and Azerbaijan, and has largely defined the fates of both countries. Unlike Armenia, which remains a strong Russian ally, Azerbaijan has begun, since Russia's 2008 war with Georgia, to foster better relations with Turkey and other Western nations, while lessening ties with Russia.

===== Chechnya =====
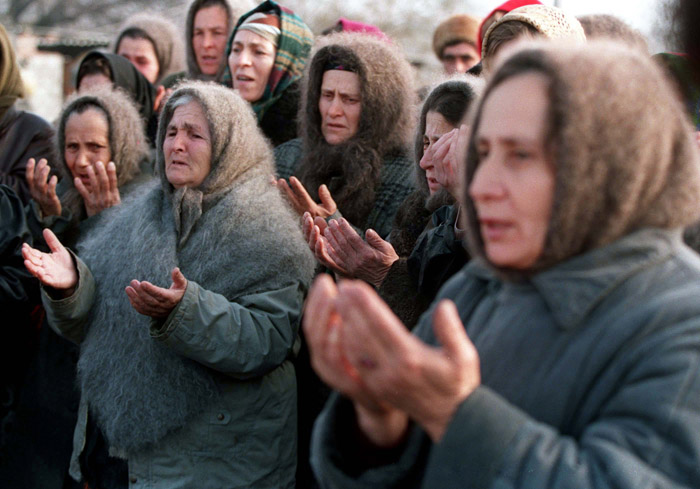
Chechen women praying for Russian troops not to advance towards Grozny during the First Chechen War, December 1994

In Chechnya, an autonomous republic within Russian SFSR that had a strong desire for independence, using tactics partly copied from the Baltics, anti-communist coalition forces led by former Soviet general Dzhokhar Dudayev staged a largely bloodless revolution, and ended up forcing the resignation of the communist republican president. Dudayev was elected in a landslide in the following election. In November 1991, he proclaimed Checheno-Ingushetia's independence as the Republic of Ichkeria. Ingushetia voted to leave the union with Chechnya, and was allowed to do so after which, Chechnya became the Chechen Republic of Ichkeria.

Due to Dudayev's desire to exclude Moscow from all oil deals, Yeltsin backed a failed coup against him in 1993. In 1994, Chechnya was invaded by Russia, spurring the First Chechen War. Chechnya had only marginal international recognition, from one country: Georgia, which was revoked soon after the coup landing Shevardnadze in power. The Chechens, with considerable assistance from the populations of both former-Soviet countries and from Sunni Muslim countries repelled the invasion, and a peace treaty was signed in 1997. However, Chechnya became increasingly anarchic, largely due to both the political and physical destruction of the state during the invasion, and general Shamil Basaev, having evaded all control by the central government, conducted raids into neighboring Dagestan, which Russia used as a pretext for reinvading Ichkeria. Ichkeria was then reincorporated into Russia as Chechnya again.

==== Central Asia ====
- Kazakhstan's independence struggle began with the Jeltoqsan uprising in 1986. Former communist leader Nursultan Nazarbayev has been in power from 1990 when he started serving as President of Kazakh SSR until his retirement from his position in 2019.
- Kyrgyzstan's Askar Akayev retained power until the Tulip Revolution in 2005.
- Tajikistan's Rahmon Nabiyev retained power, which led to the civil war in Tajikistan. Emomali Rahmon has succeeded Nabiyev and has retained power since 1992.
- Turkmenistan's Saparmurat Niyazov retained power until his death in 2006 and was criticized as one of the world's most totalitarian and repressive leaders, maintaining his own cult of personality. Niyazov's successor Gurbanguly Berdimuhamedov initially eased changes made by Niyazov before starting his very own cult of personality.
- (Uzbek Soviet Socialist Republic) Uzbekistan's Islam Karimov retained power until his death in 2016 and was widely criticized for repressing the political opposition throughout his tenure.

==== Post-Soviet conflicts ====
Georgian Civil War and the War in Abkhazia in August–October 1993

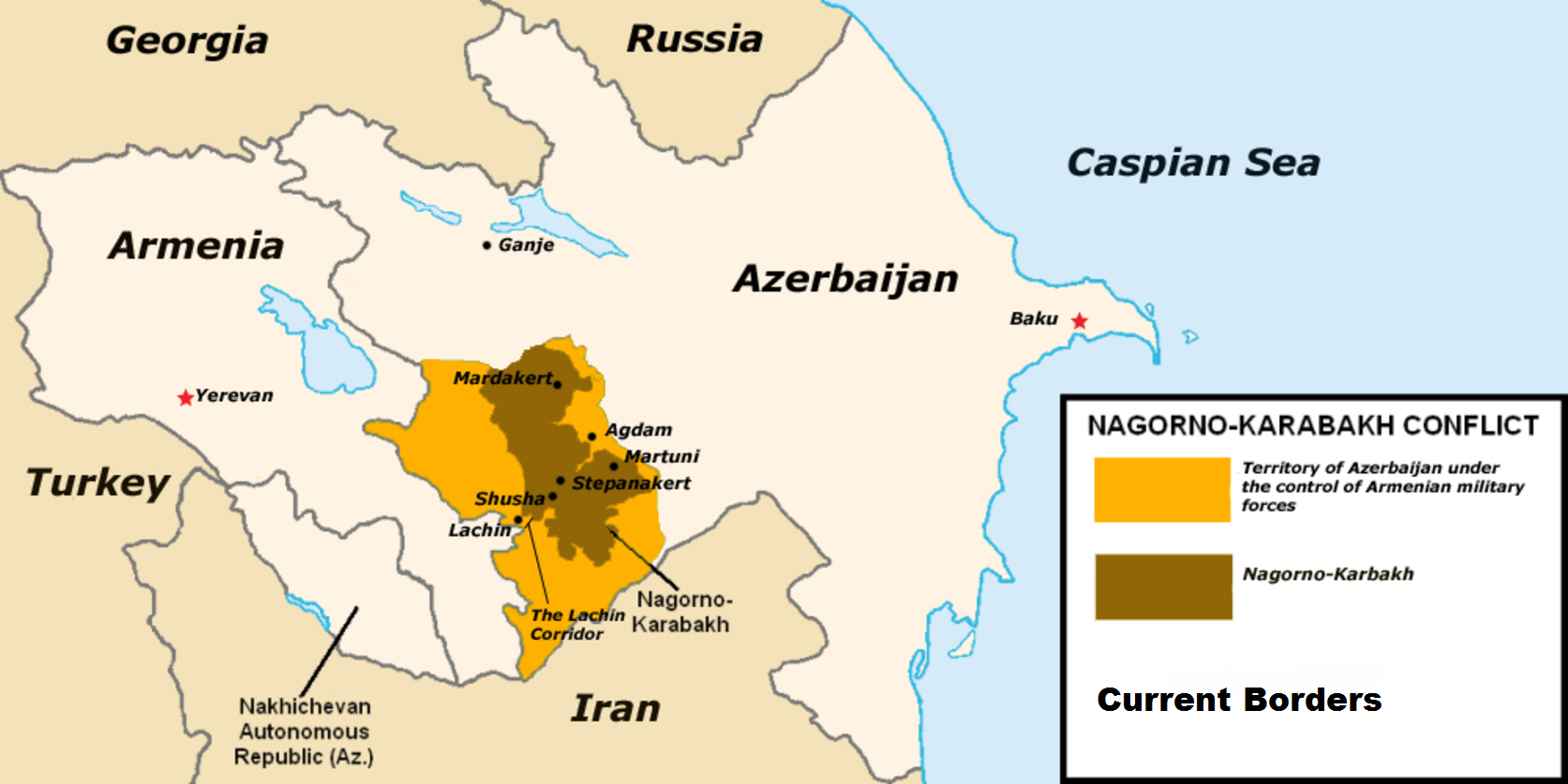
Former (2020–2023) military situation in separatist Nagorno-Karabakh

Some of the more notable post-Soviet conflicts include the Tajikistani Civil War, the First Nagorno-Karabakh War, the War of Transnistria, the 1991–1992 South Ossetia War, the First Chechen War, the War in Abkhazia, the Ossetian–Ingush conflict, the Second Chechen War, the Russo-Georgian War, the Crimea and Donbas conflicts, and the 2022 Russian invasion of Ukraine. Ethnic conflicts in the former Soviet Union, and their potential for triggering serious interstate conflicts, posed a major threat to regional and international security for years ahead.

=== Other events ===
==== Communist and socialist countries ====
Reforms in the Soviet Union and its allied countries also led to dramatic changes to communist and socialist states outside of Europe.

Countries that retained socialist-styled economies and government structures beyond 1991:

- China – China remained under the control of the Chinese Communist Party, whilst continuing far-reaching economic reforms.
- Cuba – Cuba remained under the control of the Communist Party of Cuba and retained a socialist planned economy.
- India – Indian economic reforms were launched in 1991. Poverty reduced from 36 percent in 1993–94 to 24.1 percent in 1999–2000.
- Laos – Laos remained under the control of the Lao People's Revolutionary Party and retained many socialist economic policies.
- Libya – Libya remained governed according to Muammar Gaddafi's socialist Third International Theory, and retained a socialist planned economy until 2011. It had started with the Libyan civil war and ended with Gaddafi's killing in 2011.
- North Korea – North Korea remained under the control of the Workers' Party of Korea and retained a socialist planned economy.
- – Syria remained under the control of the Syrian Ba'ath Party and retained a socialist (Ba'athist) planned economy under Hafez al-Assad. After Assad's death in 2000 his son Bashar took over. The regime came to an end in 2024 with Bashar's ousting, after a civil war that had lasted nearly fourteen years.
- Vietnam – Vietnam remained under the control of the Communist Party of Vietnam and pursued economic reforms.

===== Africa =====
- Algeria – 1988 October Riots, democratization through the 1989 constitutional referendum, victory of, an Islamist party, the FIS in the 1990 local elections and in the 1991 legislative elections, leading to a military coup in January 1992, sparking the Algerian Civil War, until 2002.
- Angola – The ruling MPLA government abandoned Marxism–Leninism in 1991 and agreed to the Bicesse Accords in the same year, however the Angolan Civil War between the MPLA and the conservative UNITA continued for another decade until 2002.
- Benin – Mathieu Kérékou's regime was pressured to abandon Marxism–Leninism in 1989.
- Burkina Faso – Thomas Sankara was overthrown and assassinated in the 1987 Burkinabé coup d'état, during which power was taken by Blaise Compaoré, who reversed many of Sankara's social policies. Military rule was ended in 1989, with the establishment of the ODP-MT and the Popular Front coalition, beginning a process of democratization that started in 1991 and finished when Compaoré was finally forced to resign by the 2014 Burkinabé uprising.
- Burundi – 1996 Burundian coup d'état
- Cape Verde – The ruling African Party for the Independence of Cape Verde party cut down its socialist ideology and foreign donors pressured the government to allow multiparty elections in 1991 which it lost to the Movement for Democracy.
- Central African Republic – democratization in 1992.
- Congo-Brazzaville – Denis Sassou Nguesso's regime was pressured to abandon Marxism–Leninism in 1991. The nation had elections in 1992 and First Republic of the Congo Civil War in 1993.
- Djibouti – Djiboutian Civil War in 1991 and democratization in 1992.

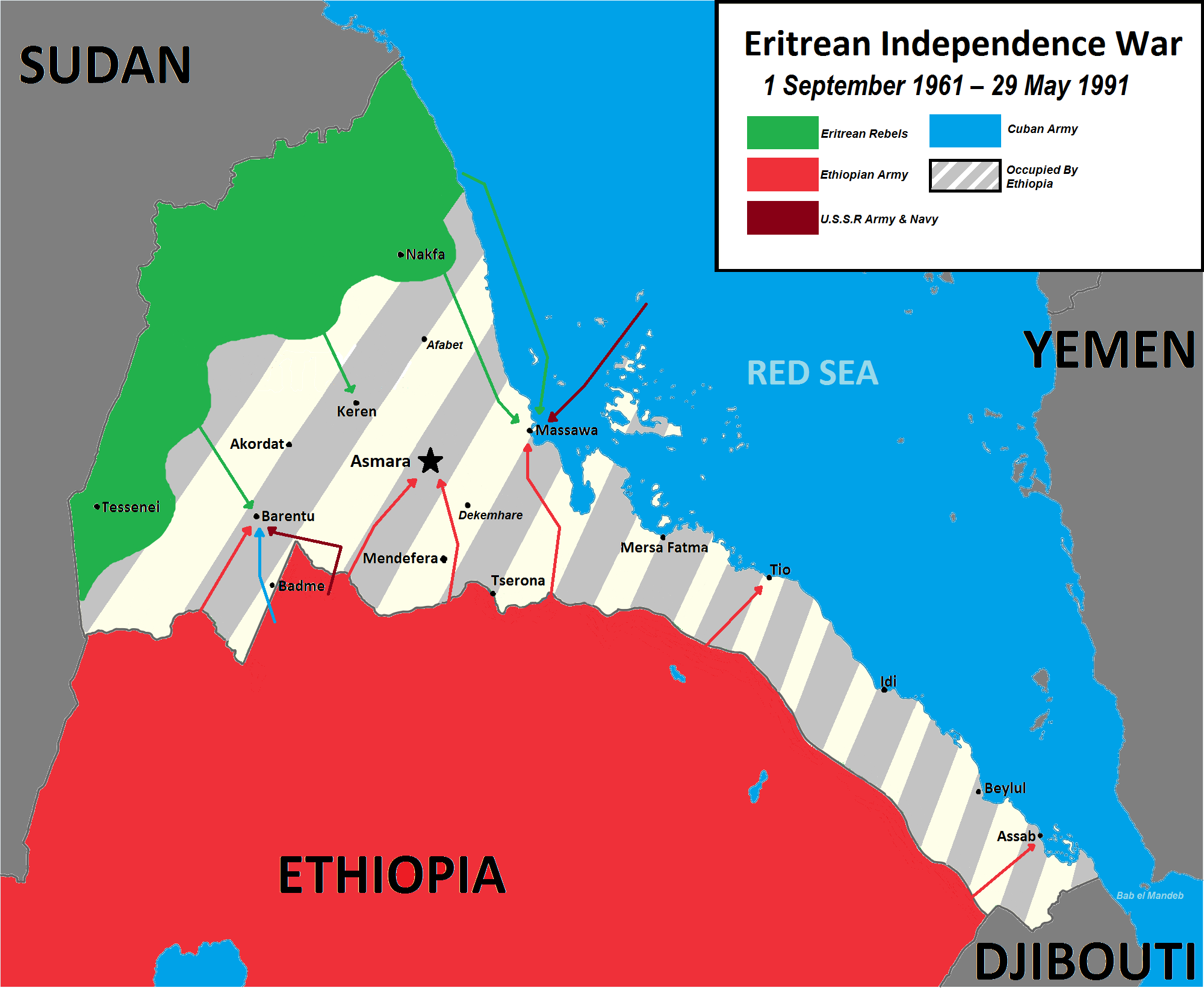
The Eritrean War of Independence against Ethiopia ended in 1991.

- Ethiopia – A new constitution was implemented in 1987 and, following the withdrawal of Soviet and Cuban assistance, the communist military junta Derg led by Mengistu Haile Mariam was defeated by the rebel EPRDF which was originally Hoxhaist in the Ethiopian Civil War and fled in 1991.
- Ghana – The Third Republic of Ghana and the military government of Jerry Rawlings are dissolved following democratization in 1992, leading to the establishment a democratically elected government under the National Democratic Congress.
- Guinea-Bissau – A process of democratization begins with the introduction of multi-party politics in May 1991 and the first democratic elections being held in 1994.
- Guinea – 1984 Guinean coup d'état
- Madagascar – Socialist President Didier Ratsiraka was ousted in 1991.
- Mali – Moussa Traoré was ousted, Mali adopted a new constitution; held multi-party elections. Rebellion in 1990 and coup d'état in 1991.
- Mozambique – The Mozambican Civil War between the socialist FRELIMO and the RENAMO conservatives was ended via treaty in 1992. FRELIMO subsequently abandoned Marxism–Leninism in favor of democratic socialism with the support of the UN, held multiparty elections.
- São Tomé and Príncipe – The ruling Movement for the Liberation of São Tomé and Príncipe/Social Democratic Party cut down its Socialist ideology and foreign donors pressured the government to allow multiparty elections in 1991 which it lost to the Democratic Convergence Party.
- Senegal – Socialist Party of Senegal formed a national unity government with the Senegalese Democratic Party in 1991.
- Seychelles – democratization in 1991.
- Sierra Leone – The start of the Sierra Leone Civil War in March 1991, followed by a constitutional referendum restoring multi-party politics in August 1991 and a coup d'état finally overthrowing the First Republic of Sierra Leone in April 1992.
- Somalia – 1988 offensive by SNM rebels during the Somaliland War of Independence leads to the acceleration of the Isaaq genocide. Rebelling Somalis overthrew Siad Barre's communist military junta during the Somali Revolution in January 1991, with Somaliland later unilaterally declaring independence in May 1991. Somalia has been in a constant state of civil war ever since.
- Sudan – The 1985 Sudanese coup d'état overthrows the Democratic Republic of the Sudan. After a brief period of parliamentary democracy during the late 1980s, the 1989 Sudanese coup d'état establishes a right-wing dictatorship under Omar al-Bashir.
- Tanzania – The ruling Chama Cha Mapinduzi party cut down its Socialist ideology and foreign donors pressured the government to allow multiparty elections in 1995.
- Tunisia – Habib Bourguiba removed from power by Zine El Abidine Ben Ali in the 1987 Tunisian coup d'état, reforming the Socialist Destourian Party into the Democratic Constitutional Rally in 1988 and holding the first multi-party election in 1989. The Tunisian Communist Party abandoned communism and reformed itself as the Ettajdid Movement in 1993.
- Uganda – The government of Milton Obote is overthrown by a coup in 1985, followed by the end of the Ugandan Bush War in 1986. With the rise of Yoweri Museveni to power, the National Resistance Movement cut down its Socialist ideology.
- (Sahrawi Arab Democratic Republic) Western Sahara – cut down its Socialist ideology and the End of the Western Sahara War in 1991.
- Zambia – The ruling United National Independence Party cut down its Socialist ideology and foreign donors pressured the government to allow multiparty elections in 1991 which it lost to the Movement for Multi-Party Democracy.

===== Middle East =====
- Iraq – Uprisings in 1991, leading to Kurdistan becoming an autonomous region. The rest of Iraq remained under Saddam Hussein's Ba'athist regime until 2003 with American invasion overthrowing his regime in 1 month.
- Kuwait – Annexed by Iraq in 1990. Then liberated in 1991 during the Gulf War.
- Palestinian Territories – The Palestine Liberation Organization lost one of its most important diplomatic patrons, due to the deterioration of the Soviet Union, Arafat's failing relationship with Moscow and loss of a one-party government, and Suspension PFLP-GC of the PLO in 1984. First Intifada occurred from 1987 to 1991, leading to the PLO recognition of Israel.
- South Yemen – The South Yemen Civil War began in 1986. The government abandoned Marxism–Leninism in 1990. In 1990, Yemen reunified with the more capitalist North Yemen. In 1994, this led to a civil war.
- Syria – The Syrian Communist Party was divided to two parties in 1986. Syria participated in the Madrid Conference of 1991 and met its Cold War enemy Israel in peace negotiations. The Syrian Democratic People's Party changed from Left-wing to center-left.

===== Asia =====
- Afghanistan – The People's Democratic Party underwent National Reconciliation reforms from 1987, renaming the country to Republic of Afghanistan (from "Democratic Republic") and removing the red star of communism from the coat of arms. The Soviet occupation ended in 1989, and in 1990 the ruling party renamed itself, removing all references to Marxism–Leninism in the process. The Soviet-backed government fell in 1992 and the party was dissolved; a new Civil War followed.
- (Myanmar) Burma – The 8888 Uprising in 1988 saw the demise of the Burma Socialist Programme Party, but failed to bring democracy, although Marxism was abandoned. The country was led by a military government under the State Peace and Development Council until 2011, following 2010 elections viewed by many Western countries as fraudulent. End of the communist insurgency in 1989.
- Cambodia – The Vietnam-supported government, which had been in power since the fall of the Khmer Rouge, lost power following UN-sponsored elections in 1993, the CGDK and the Party of Democratic Kampuchea were dissolved in 1993.
- China – The Chinese Communist Party began implementing the reform and opening up during the late 1970s under Deng Xiaoping. However, the pro-democracy protests of 1989 were crushed by the military. Western countries imposed arms embargoes on China. Unrest in Tibet in 1987.
- India – Defeat of the Indian National Congress in the 1989 Indian general election. The Rashtriya Samajwadi Congress was dissolved in 1989, Tripura National Volunteers was dissolved in 1988 and Hmar People's Convention was dissolved in 1986. Beginning of the Insurgency in Jammu and Kashmir in 1989. The Naxalite–Maoist insurgency continued into the 21st century, while the Communist Party of India (Marxist) remains a major political force in the states of West Bengal, Kerala and Tripura.
- Laos – Remained communist under the Lao People's Revolutionary Party. Laos was forced to ask France and Japan for emergency assistance, and also to ask the World Bank and the Asian Development Bank for aid. Finally, in 1989, Kaisôn visited Beijing to confirm the restoration of friendly relations, and to secure Chinese aid. The red star and the hammer and sickle was taken out from the crest in 1991.
- North Korea – Kim Il-sung died in 1994, passing power to his son Kim Jong-il. Unprecedented floods and the dissolution of the Soviet Union led to the North Korean famine, which resulted in the deaths of an estimated 2.5 million to 3 million North Koreans North Korea is still a single-party communist state.
- Sri Lanka – End of the second communist insurgrency by the communist Janatha Vimukthi Peramuna and the death of its leaders, but the Civil War continues until 2009.
- Vietnam – The Communist Party of Vietnam has undertaken Doi Moi reforms since 1986, liberalizing certain sectors of the economy in a manner similar to China. Vietnam is still a single-party communist state and bloc parties were dissolved in 1988.

===== Latin America =====
- Cuba – The end of Soviet subsidies led to the Special Period. An unsuccessful protest was held in 1994, in which thousands of Cubans took to the streets around the Malecón in Havana to demand freedom and express frustration with the government. Cuba is still a single-party communist state.
- Guyana – After the death of Forbes Burnham in 1985, his successor Desmond Hoyte oversaw a period of democratization and the first free elections were held in October 1992, during which the likewise socialist People's Progressive Party of Cheddi Jagan was elected.
- Nicaragua – End of the Contra War, Daniel Ortega's Sandinista lost the multi-party elections in 1990, and the National Opposition Union won.
- Suriname – National Democratic Party lost the multi-party elections in 1987, and Suriname Guerrilla War 1986–1992.

===== Oceania =====
- Vanuatu – Vanua'aku Pati lost the multi-party elections in 1991, and the Union of Moderate Parties won. Voter turnout was 71%.

==== Other countries ====
Many Soviet-supported political parties and militant groups around the world suffered from demoralization and loss of financing.

- Australia – The Communist Party of Australia was dissolved in 1991.
- Austria – The Communist Party of Austria lost its East German financing and 250 million euros in assets.
- Belgium – The Communist Party of Belgium was divided to two parties in 1989.
- West Berlin – The Socialist Unity Party of West Berlin was dissolved in 1991.
- Canada – In 1990 the Communist Party of Canada was de-registered and had its assets seized, forcing it to begin an ultimately successful thirteen-year political and legal battle to maintain registration of small political parties in Canada known as Figueroa v. Canada, thus changing the legal definition of a political party in Canada in 2003 and now operates without any elected political representation.
- Equatorial Guinea – first multi-party elections in 1993.
- Finland – The Finnish People's Democratic League was dissolved in 1990 and the bankrupt Communist Party of Finland collapsed in 1992, and absorbed to the Left Alliance.
- France – The collapse of the Eastern Bloc came as a shock to the French Communist Party. The crisis is called la mutation. Fusion of the Unified Socialist Party with the New Left for Socialism, Ecology and Self-management for Red and Green Alternatives in 1989.
- Gambia – 1994 Gambian coup d'état
- West Germany – The German Communist Party lost its East German financing and declined significantly and the Communist League was dissolved. The Red Army Faction lost its long-term supporter, the Stasi, after the fall of the Berlin Wall.
- Greece – The Organisation of Marxist–Leninist Communists of Greece was dissolved in 1993 and merged into the Movement for a United Communist Party of Greece. Greek Left was dissolved in 1992.
- Guinea – democratization in 1990.
- Ireland – The Communist Party of Ireland declined significantly. Democratic Socialist Party was dissolved.
- Italy – The collapse caused the Italian Communist Party to reform itself, creating two new groups, the larger Democratic Party of the Left and the smaller Communist Refoundation Party. The disappearance of the Communist party in part led to profound changes within the Italian political party system in 1992–1994 and collapse of the Radical Party in 1989 and the Italian Socialist Party in 1994. Disintegration of the Red Brigades in 1988.
- Japan – The Japanese Communist Party became gradually influenced by Eurocommunism and issued a statement titled "We welcome the end of a great historical evil of imperialism and hegemonism". As a result, the JCP survived the post-Cold War decline of communist parties in the Western Bloc, and remains one of the largest non-governing communist parties in the world.
- Lebanon – End of the Civil War
- Liberia – First Liberian Civil War
- Luxembourg – The Communist Party of Luxembourg declined significantly.
- Malaysia – The Malayan Communist Party laid down its arms in 1989, ending an insurgency that had lasted decades.
- Maldives – the failed 1988 Maldives coup d'état
- Mexico – the Mexican Socialist Party, the last effort to unify the different Mexican left-wing parties, and the last political party in Mexico to officially use the word "socialist" in its name, dissolved in 1989.
- Nepal – The Communist Party of Nepal (Janamukhi) and the Communist Party of Nepal (Fourth Convention) was dissolved in 1990.
- Netherlands – The Communist Party of the Netherlands was dissolved in 1991 and absorbed to the GreenLeft. League of Communists in the Netherlands was dissolved in 1992.
- Niger – democratization in 1991, but Coup d'état in 1996.
- Norway – The Communist Party of Norway changed their pro-Soviet line.
- Oman – The Popular Front for the Liberation of Oman was dissolved in 1992.
- Philippines – The Communist Party of the Philippines experienced criticism and the debates that ensued between the leading party cadres resulted to the expulsion of advocates of "left and right opportunism" notably forming the so-called "rejectionists" and "reaffirmist" factions. Those who affirmed the Maoist orthodoxy were called the "Reaffirmists", or RA, while those who rejected the document were called "Rejectionists" or RJ. In July 1993, the Komiteng Rehiyon ng Manila-Rizal (KRMR), one of the Rejectionists, declared its autonomy from the central leadership. Within a few months, several of the Party's regional formations and bureaus followed suit, permanently formalizing and deepening the schism.
- San Marino – The Sammarinese Communist Party was dissolved in 1990.
- Singapore – The Barisan Sosialis was dissolved in 1988.
- Spain – The Workers' Party of Spain–Communist Unity was dissolved in 1991. Alternative Left was dissolved in 1993. Communist Party of Spain (Marxist–Leninist) (historical) was dissolved in 1992. The Communist Party of Galicia (Revolutionary Marxist) was dissolved in 1989.
- Sweden – The Communist Association of Norrköping was dissolved in 1990 and Kommunistiska Förbundet Marxist-Leninisterna ceased to function as nationwide party. The pro-Albanian Kommunistiska Partiet i Sverige and the Maoist Communist Workers' Party of Sweden were dissolved in 1993. The main leftist party, Vänsterpartiet kommunisterna, VPK (Left Party – Communists), abandoned the communist part of its name, and became simply Vänsterpartiet (Left Party).
- Turkey – The Communist Labour Party of Turkey was split.
- United Kingdom – The Communist Party of Great Britain was dissolved.
- Venezuela – 1992 Venezuelan coup d'état attempts

Concurrently, many anti-communist authoritarian states, formerly supported by the US, gradually saw a transition to democracy.

- Bangladesh – In 1990, a mass uprising leads to the end of the country's military dictatorship and a restoration of democracy. The Communist Party of Bangladesh experiences a split between an orthodox Marxist–Leninist faction and a more democratic and libertarian faction. The country experiences an internal conflict, driven by the rise of Islamism since 1989. The left-leaning Awami League returned to power in June 1996 for the first time since the coup in 1975.
- Brazil – Held the first democratic presidential election since 1960 due to reforms started a few years earlier.
- Cameroon – democratization in 1991.
- Chad – Coup d'état in 1990.
- Chile – While communist guerillas were unsuccessful in toppling the anti-communist regime, the military junta under Augusto Pinochet was pressured to implement democratic elections, which saw Chile's democratization in 1990. The Broad Party of Socialist Left subsequently merged into the Socialist Party of Chile.
- Colombia – The conservative constitution of 1886 was repealed in 1991. The 19th of April Movement, the Quintin Lame Armed Movement and most of the Popular Liberation Army gave up their weapons and began to participate in politics. The FARC continued its role in the Colombian conflict into the 21st century.
- El Salvador – The Salvadoran Civil War ended in 1992 following the Chapultepec Peace Accords. The rebel FMLN movement became a legal political party and participated in subsequent elections.
- Gabon – democratization in 1991.
- Guatemala – The Guatemalan Civil War ended in 1996 and the rebel Guatemalan National Revolutionary Unity became a legal party.
- Haiti – Haitian Revolution of 1986
- Indonesia – The Suharto regime received great international criticism for its role in the 1991 Santa Cruz massacre and continued occupation of East Timor, leading to US sanctions. Suharto resigned in 1998 following mass protests, and East Timor gained independence in 2002 following the 1999 referendum.
- Ivory Coast – democratization in 1990.
- Kenya – Restoration of multi-party democracy in 1991
- Malawi – democratization in 1993.
- Mauritania – 1984 Mauritanian coup d'état; democratization in 1992.
- Pakistan – democratization in 1988.
- Panama – The Manuel Noriega regime was overthrown by the US invasion in 1989 as a result of his suppression of elections, drug-trafficking activities and the killing of a US serviceman.
- Paraguay – The dictatorship of Alfredo Stroessner came to an end when he was deposed in a military coup d'état. In 1992, the country's new constitution established a democratic system of government.
- Peru – The internal conflict in Peru intensified under Alberto Fujimori, who was criticized for his increased authoritarian rule and human rights abuses until his downfall in 2000. The Túpac Amaru Revolutionary Movement ended its role in the internal conflict in Peru in 1997. The Shining Path, responsible for killing tens of thousands people, shrunk in the 1990s, but continued into the 21st century.
- Philippines – People Power Revolution in 1986 led to the downfall of Ferdinand Marcos. Communist rebellion in the Philippines continued into the 21st century.
- Rwanda – Rwandan Civil War in 1990 and Genocide in 1994.
- Saudi Arabia – Following the Soviet-Afghan War, Osama bin Laden, the founder of the Islamist militant group al-Qaeda, proposed to the Saudi monarchy not to rely on the United States after the fall of Kuwait. Bin Laden later denounced the Saudi invitation of the U.S. 82nd Airborne Division and was eventually expelled from the country in 1992 due to the criticism. His citizenship was revoked in 1994.
- South Korea – The June Democracy Movement's nationwide protests led to the downfall of the Chun Doo-hwan government in 1987, and the country's first democratic elections. In 2000, North and South Korea agreed in principle to work towards peaceful reunification in the future.
- South Africa – Negotiations were started in 1990 to end the Apartheid system. Nelson Mandela was elected as the President of South Africa in 1994.
- Taiwan (Republic of China) – In 1987 the ruling Kuomintang party ended its strict martial law introduced at the end of the Chinese Civil War. Gradual democratic reforms led to the first direct presidential election in 1996.
- Togo – democratization in 1993.
- United Kingdom – The Northern Ireland peace process led to an end of The Troubles in 1998, with the signing of the Good Friday Agreement.
- United States – Following the end of the Cold War, the United States became the world's sole superpower. It ceased to support many of the military dictatorships it had during the Cold War, pressing more nations to adopt democracy.
- Yemen Arab Republic – unified with the communist South Yemen after the separation period (1967–1990) and also democratized in 1990, then suppressed communist secessionist movement in the South in 1994.
- Zaire – Civil War in 1996.

===== Countries that emerged into socialist-styled governments beyond 1991 =====
- Bolivia – Evo Morales led the Movement for Socialism which led to the establishment of the socialistic Plurinational State in 2009 and ruled the country until his ouster in a coup.
- Nepal – Monarchy was overthrown in 2008 and the republic was ruled by the Communist Party until the 2025 revolution.
- Venezuela – Hugo Chavez led the Fifth Republic Movement which led to the establishment of the Bolivarian Republic in 1999 and ruled the country until his death in 2013.

===== Other impacts =====
Global effects of the 1988–1992 revolutions Autocratic government overthrown violently Autocratic government overthrown peacefully* Ruling party abandons Marxism–Leninism or socialism/Economic liberalization War ended War started Democratization** Communist party collapses Unsuccessful revolution * East Germany cannot be displayed due to the limitations of {{choropleth map}} ** North Yemen cannot be displayed due to the limitations of {{choropleth map}}

- Israel – In 1990, the Soviet Union finally permitted free emigration of Soviet Jews to Israel. Prior to this, Jews trying to leave the USSR faced persecution; those who succeeded arrived as refugees. Over the next few years, some one million Soviet citizens migrated to Israel. Although there was a concern that some of the new immigrants had only a very tenuous connection to Judaism, and many were accompanied by non-Jewish relatives, this massive wave of migration brought large numbers of highly educated Soviet Jews and slowly changed the demographic nature of Israel. In addition, thousands of Ethiopian Jews were rescued by the Israel Defense Forces in 1991.

== Political reforms ==
Decommunization is a process of overcoming the legacies of the communist state establishments, culture, and psychology in the post-communist states. Decommunization was largely limited or non-existent. Communist parties were not outlawed and their members were not brought to trial. Just a few places even attempted to exclude members of communist secret services from decision-making.

In a number of countries the communist party simply changed its name and continued to function. In several European countries, however, endorsing or attempting to justify crimes committed by communist regimes became punishable by up to three years of imprisonment.

== Economic reforms ==
Russian GDP since the end of the Soviet Union. From 2014 are forecasts

State run enterprises in socialist countries had little or no interest in producing what customers wanted, which resulted in shortages of goods and services. In the early 1990s, the general view was that there was no precedent for moving from socialism to capitalism", and only some elderly people remembered how a market economy worked. As a result, the view that Central, Southeastern and Eastern Europe would stay poor for decades was common.

The collapse of the Soviet Union, and the breakdown of economic ties which followed led to a severe economic crisis and catastrophic fall in the standards of living in the 1990s in post-Soviet states and the former Eastern bloc. Even before Russia's financial crisis of 1998, Russia's GDP was half of what it had been in the early 1990s.

There was a temporary fall of output in the official economy and an increase in black market economic activity. Countries implemented different reform programs. One example, generally regarded as successful was the "shock therapy" Balcerowicz Plan in Poland. Eventually the official economy began to grow.

In a 2007 paper, Oleh Havrylyshyn categorized the speed of reforms in the former communist countries of Europe:

- Sustained Big-Bang (fastest): Estonia, Latvia, Lithuania, Czech Republic, Poland, Slovakia
- Advance Start/Steady Progress: Croatia, Hungary, Slovenia
- Aborted Big-Bang: Albania, Bulgaria, Macedonia, Kyrgyzstan, Russia
- Gradual Reforms: Azerbaijan, Armenia, Georgia, Kazakhstan, Ukraine, Tajikistan, Romania
- Limited Reforms (slowest): Belarus, Uzbekistan, Turkmenistan

NATO has added 13 new members since the German reunification and the end of the Cold War.

The 2004 enlargement of the European Union included the Czech Republic, Estonia, Hungary, Latvia, Lithuania, Poland, Slovakia, and Slovenia. The 2007 enlargement of the European Union included Romania and Bulgaria, and Croatia joined the EU in 2013. The same countries have also become NATO members. In Mongolia, the economy was reformed in a similar fashion to the Eastern European counterparts. Armenia declared its decision to join the Customs Union and the Common Economic Space of Belarus, Kazakhstan and Russia, and participated in the formation of the Eurasian Economic Union. Effective from 2015, Armenia joined the treaty on the Eurasian Economic Union.

China's reform and opening up began in 1978 and has helped lift millions of people out of poverty, bringing the poverty rate down from 53% of the population in the Mao era, to 12% in 1981. Deng's economic reforms are still being followed by the CCP today, and by 2001 the poverty rate was only 6% of the population.

Economic liberalization in Vietnam was initiated in 1986, following the Chinese example.

Economic liberalization in India was initiated in 1991.

Harvard University Professor Richard B. Freeman has called the effect of reforms "The Great Doubling". He calculated that the size of the global workforce doubled from 1.46 billion workers to 2.93 billion workers. An immediate effect was a reduced ratio of capital to labor. In the long-term, China, India, and the former Soviet bloc will save and invest and contribute to the expansion of the world capital stock.

== Interpretations ==
The events caught many people by surprise. Before 1991, many thought that the collapse of the Soviet Union was impossible.

Bartlomiej Kaminski's book The Collapse of State Socialism argued that the state Socialist system has a lethal paradox, saying that "policy actions designed to improve performance only accelerate its decay".

By the end of 1989, revolts had spread from one capital to another, ousting the regimes imposed on Central, South-East and Eastern Europe after World War II. Even the isolationist Stalinist regime in Albania was unable to stem the tide. Gorbachev's abrogation of the Brezhnev Doctrine was perhaps the key factor that enabled the popular uprisings to succeed. Once it became evident that the feared Soviet Army would not intervene to crush dissent, the Central, South-East and Eastern European regimes were exposed as vulnerable in the face of popular uprisings against the one-party system and power of secret police.

In 1990, Coit D. Blacker wrote that the Soviet leadership "appeared to have believed that whatever loss of authority the Soviet Union might suffer in Central and South-East Europe would be more than offset by a net increase in its influence in western Europe." Nevertheless, it is unlikely that Gorbachev ever intended for the complete dismantling of communism and the Warsaw Pact. Rather, Gorbachev assumed that the communist parties of Central and South-East Europe could be reformed in a similar way to the reforms he hoped to achieve in the CPSU.

Just as perestroika was aimed at making the Soviet Union more efficient economically and politically, Gorbachev believed that the Comecon and Warsaw Pact could be reformed into more effective entities. However, Alexander Yakovlev, a close advisor to Gorbachev, later stated that it would have been "absurd to keep the system" in Central and South-East Europe. Yakovlev came to the conclusion that the Soviet-dominated Comecon could not work on non-market principles, and that the Warsaw Pact had "no relevance to real life".

In retrospect, authoritarian regimes such as the Soviet Union are more likely to be subject to economic sanctions by democratic nations, creating a riskier vulnerability to collapse. In 1991, Timur Kuran wrote that generally leaders were despised and failed to meet expectations of freedoms and economic prosperity that they had promised, leading to citizen motivation to upheave the government. Economic distress mirrored across most regimes had declined growth rates to near zero leading up to their respective uprisings. While socialist economics may have played a role, Stathis N. Kalyvas argues that international sanctions as well as the government makeup of authoritarian regimes were equally as impactful in reducing their economy's prosperity.

Scholars such as Gale Stokes argue that the moral repression under the guise of security by communist regimes had brought citizens to the streets. Others argue that the repression of revolutionary dissidents and human rights justified revolutionary privilege throughout Europe.

== Remembrance ==
=== Organizations ===
- Memorial, an international historical and civil rights society that operates in a number of post-Soviet states which focuses on recording and publicising the Soviet Union's totalitarian aspect of the past, but also monitors human rights in post-Soviet states at the present time, for example in Chechnya

=== Events ===
- German Unity Day in Germany, a national holiday commemorating the anniversary of German reunification in 1990
- Statehood Day in Slovenia commemorates the country's declaration of independence from Yugoslavia in 1991
- Independence and Unity Day in Slovenia commemorates the country's independence referendum
- Day of National Unity in Georgia is a public holiday commemorating victims of the 9 April tragedy
- National Day in Hungary
- Constitution Day in Mongolia commemorates the country's transition to democracy in 1992
- Constitution Day in Romania commemorates the 1991 Romanian Constitution that enshrined the return to democracy after the fall of the communist regime
- Struggle for Freedom and Democracy Day in Slovakia
- Struggle for Freedom and Democracy Day in the Czech Republic
- Restoration of Independence Day in Latvia commemorates the 1990 declaration restoring the country's independence

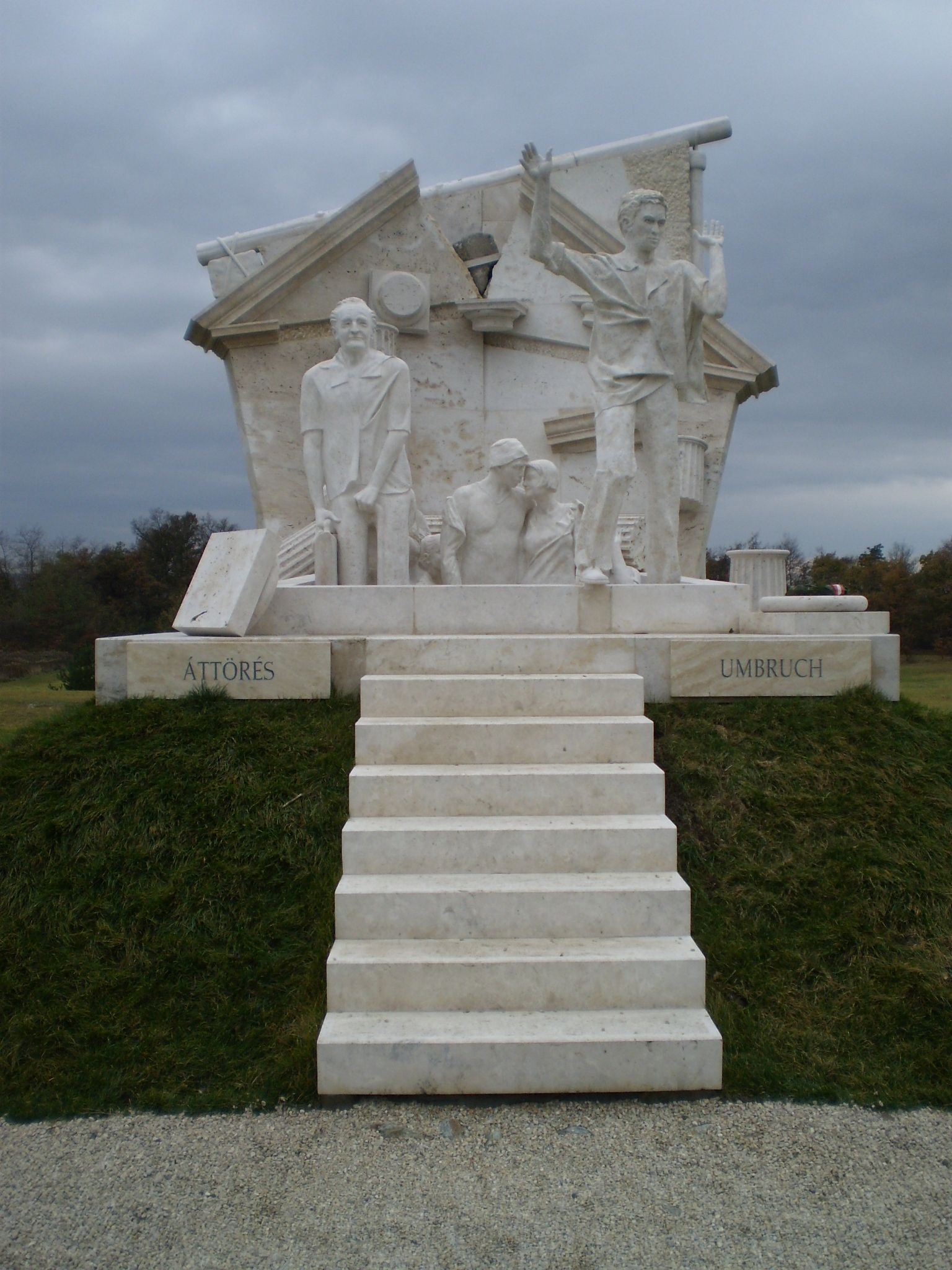
The Pan-European Picnic (Hungarian: Páneurópai piknik) memorial near Sopron, by Hungarian artist Miklós Melocco.

=== Places ===
- Checkpoint Charlie Museum in Berlin, Germany
- Dawn of Liberty in Kazakhstan, a monument dedicated to Jeltoqsan
- DDR Museum in Berlin, Germany
- European Solidarity Centre in Poland
- Gdańsk Shipyard in Poland
- Global Museum on Communism in Washington DC, US
- Grūtas Park in Lithuania
- House of Terror in Hungary
- Lennon Wall in the Czech Republic
- Memento Park in Hungary
- Memorial of Rebirth in Romania
- Memorial to the Victims of Communism in the Czech Republic
- Museum of Genocide Victims in Vilnius, Lithuania
- Museum of Communism, Czech Republic
- Museum of Communism, Poland
- Museum of Occupations (Estonia)
- Museum of Occupation (Lithuania)
- Museum of the Occupation of Latvia
- Museum of Socialist Art in Bulgaria
- Museum of Soviet Occupation in Kyiv, Ukraine
- Museum of Soviet Occupation in Tbilisi, Georgia
- Muzeul Memoriei Neamului in Moldova
- Museum of Victims of Occupational Regimes "Prison on Lontskoho" in Lviv, Ukraine
- Sighet Memorial Museum in the old prison in Sighetu Marmației, Romania
- Stasi Museum in the former Stasi headquarters, Berlin, Germany
- Transalpina Square divided between the towns of Gorizia, Italy, and Nova Gorica, Slovenia
- Victims of Political Persecution Memorial Museum in Ulaanbaatar, Mongolia

=== Other ===
- The Soviet Story, an award-winning documentary film about the Soviet Union
- The Singing Revolution, a documentary film about the Singing Revolution
- Heaven on Earth: The Rise and Fall of Socialism, a book and a documentary film based on the book
- Lenin's Tomb: The Last Days of the Soviet Empire, a Pulitzer Prize-awarded book
- A Political Tragedy in Six Acts, biography of dissident Václav Havel
- Right Here, Right Now, an international hit written by Mike Edwards and performed by his rock band Jesus Jones and released in September 1990
- "Wind of Change", a hit song by the German heavy-metal band Scorpions that celebrates Perestroika and the fall of communism in Central and Eastern Europe.

== See also ==
- Breakup of Yugoslavia
- Chinese democracy movement
- Colour revolutions
- History of Solidarity
- January Events, Lithuania, 1991
- JBTZ trial, former Yugoslavia, 1988
- People Power Revolution, Philippines, 1986
- Polish Round Table Agreement, 1989
- Reagan Doctrine

Aftermath:

- Arab Spring
- Baltic Tiger, Baltic economies
- Carpat Tiger, Romanian economy
- Commonwealth of Independent States
- Communist nostalgia
- Enlargement of NATO
- Enlargement of the European Union
- Euromaidan, Ukraine, 2013
- International relations since 1989
- Jeans Revolution, Belarus, 2006
- Orange Revolution, Ukraine, 2004
- Overthrow of Slobodan Milošević, Federal Republic of Yugoslavia, 2000
- Pink tide, Latin America, 21st century
- Rose Revolution, Georgia, 2003
- Russo-Ukrainian War
- Velvet Divorce in Czechoslovakia
- Velvet Revolution, Armenia, 2018

General:

- Civil resistance
- Democracy in Europe
- Preference falsification

Earlier revolutionary eras:

- Atlantic Revolutions, late 18th and early 19th century
- Revolutions of 1917–1923
