= 1990 Kirghiz Supreme Soviet election =

Supreme Soviet elections were held in the Kirghiz SSR on 25 February 1990, with a second round on 7 April. At the time, the Communist Party of Kirghizia (PKK) was the only party in the country, with most of the candidates being from large collectives or state organisations. Nevertheless, the Party of Communists won around 90% of the seats in the Supreme Soviet, although some MPs (both independents and PKK members) were informally affiliated with the Democratic Movement of Kyrgyzstan.

Voter turnout was 92%.
