= First Nagorno-Karabakh War =

Conflict between Armenia and Azerbaijan (1988–1994)

- Part of the Nagorno-Karabakh conflict, the dissolution of the Soviet Union, and the Wars in the Caucasus
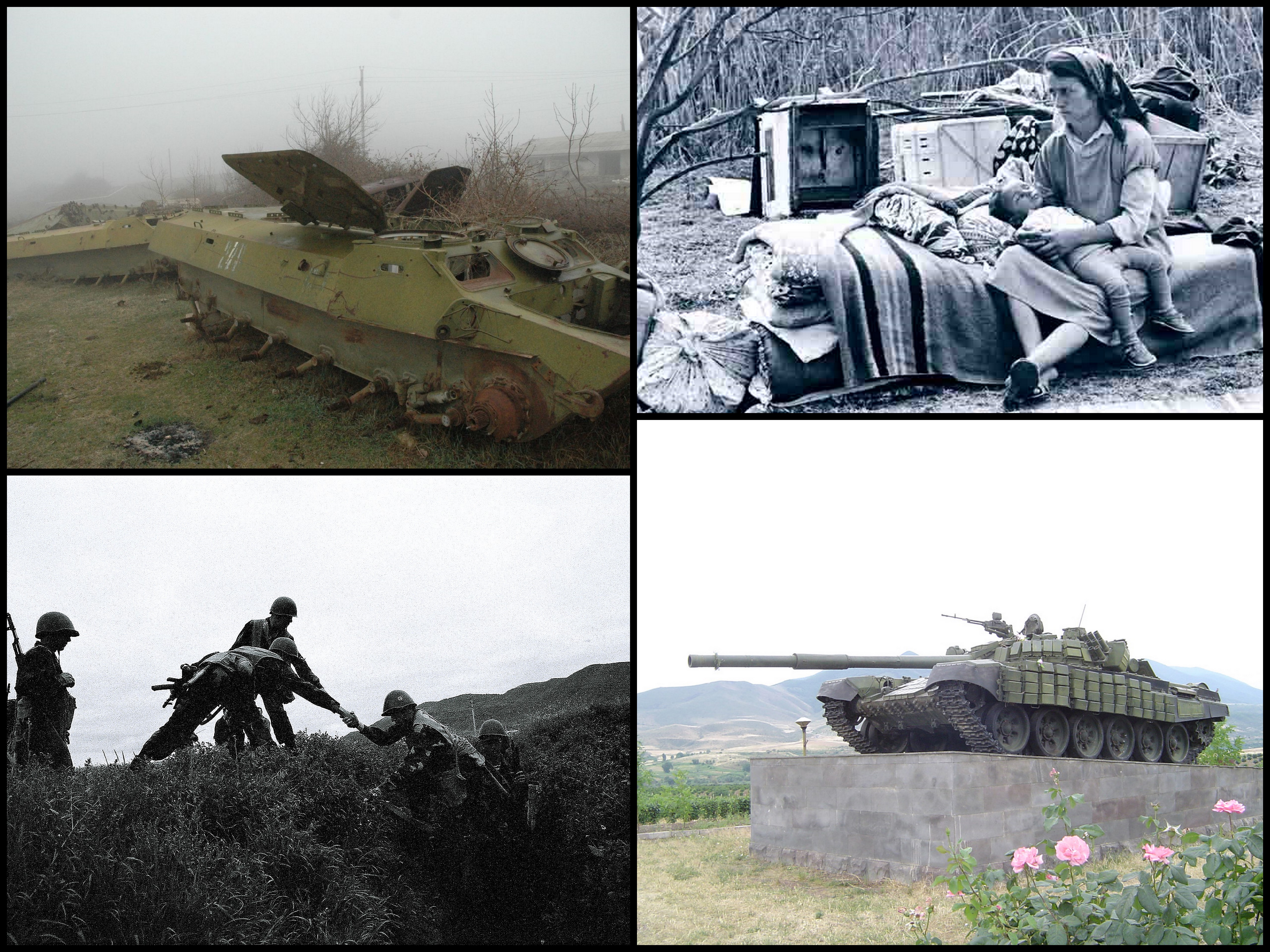
- Clockwise from top left: Remnants of Azerbaijani APCs; internally displaced Azerbaijanis from the Armenian-occupied territories; Armenian T-72 tank memorial at the outskirts of Stepanakert; Armenian soldiers
Date	20 February 1988 – 12 May 1994 (6 years, 2 months, 3 weeks and 1 day)
Location	Nagorno-Karabakh, Armenia and Azerbaijan
Result	Armenian victory
Territorial changes	De facto independence of Nagorno-Karabakh Republic and de facto unification with Armenia Armenian occupation of territories surrounding Nagorno-Karabakh

Belligerents
Nagorno-Karabakh (Note: Nagorno-Karabakh Autonomous Oblast (NKAO) until 1991.); Armenia (Note: Armenian Soviet Socialist Republic (Soviet Armenia) until 1990 (renamed Republic of Armenia)/1991 (declared independence).); Armenian Revolutionary Federation; Foreign groups: Kuban Cossacks; Ossetian volunteers; Slavic mercenaries	Azerbaijan (from 1991); Soviet Union (until 1991) (Note: Soviet authorities generally sided with Azerbaijan over Nagorno-Karabakh. Soviet troops were present in Nagorno-Karabakh for 2 1/2 years and supported Azerbaijani militias. Soviet troops directly intervened during Operation Ring in April–May 1991 on the Azerbaijani side.); Azerbaijan SSR; Foreign groups: Hezbe Wahdat; Hezb-e-Islami; Grey Wolves; Chechen volunteers; UNA-UNSO; Slavic mercenaries; Turkish volunteers

Commanders and leaders
Levon Ter-Petrosyan; Serzh Sargsyan; Robert Kocharyan; Vazgen Sargsyan	Ayaz Mutallibov; Yagub Mammadov; Isa Gambar; Abulfaz Elchibey; Heydar Aliyev; Isgandar Hamidov; Surat Huseynov; Gulbuddin Hekmatyar

Strength
30,000–40,000 (1993–94)	42,600 (1993–94): Turkey: 350 officers; Grey Wolves: 200; Hezbe Wahdat: 1,000–3,000; Chechen volunteers: 100–300

Casualties and losses
Dead: 5,856–6,000; Wounded: 20,000; Missing: 196	Dead: 11,557 25,000–30,000 (Western and Russian estimates); Wounded: 20,000 or 50,000; Missing: 4,210
- Civilian deaths: 16,000 Azerbaijani civilians; 4,000 Armenian civilians (including citizens of Armenia); Civilians missing: 400 according to Karabakh State Commission; 749 according to Azerbaijani State Commission; Civilians displaced: 724,000 Azerbaijanis from Armenia, Nagorno-Karabakh and the surrounding areas; 300,000–500,000 Armenians from Azerbaijan, Nagorno-Karabakh and Nakhchivan

The First Nagorno-Karabakh War (Note: Azerbaijani: Birinci Qarabağ müharibəsi, referred to in Armenia as the Artsakh Liberation War (Armenian: Արցախյան ազատամարտ, romanized: Artsakhyan azatamart)) was an ethnic and territorial conflict that took place from February 1988 to May 1994 in the enclave of Nagorno-Karabakh in southwestern Azerbaijan between the majority ethnic Armenians of Nagorno-Karabakh backed by Armenia, and the Republic of Azerbaijan with support from Turkey. As the war progressed, Armenia and Azerbaijan, both former Soviet republics, entangled themselves in protracted, undeclared mountain warfare in the mountainous heights of Karabakh as Azerbaijan attempted to curb the Karabakh Movement.

The enclave's parliament had voted in favor of uniting with Armenia and a referendum, boycotted by the Azerbaijani population of Nagorno-Karabakh, was held, in which a 99.89% voted in favor of independence with an 82.2% turnout. The demand to unify with Armenia began in a relatively peaceful manner in 1988; in the following months, as the Soviet Union disintegrated, it gradually grew into an increasingly violent conflict between Armenians and Azerbaijanis, resulting in ethnic cleansing, including the Sumgait (1988) and Baku (1990) pogroms directed against Armenians, and the Gugark pogrom (1988) and Khojaly Massacre (1992) directed against Azerbaijanis. Inter-ethnic clashes between the two broke out shortly after the parliament of the Nagorno-Karabakh Autonomous Oblast (NKAO) in Azerbaijan voted to unite the region with Armenia on 20 February 1988. The declaration of secession from Azerbaijan was the culmination of a territorial conflict. As Azerbaijan declared its independence from the Soviet Union and removed the powers held by the enclave's government, the Armenian majority voted to secede from Azerbaijan and in the process proclaimed the unrecognized Republic of Nagorno-Karabakh.

Full-scale fighting erupted in early 1992. Turkey sent mercenaries to fight for Azerbaijan and assisted in blockading all land transit to Armenia, including humanitarian aid. International mediation by several groups including the Conference for Security and Co-operation in Europe (CSCE) failed to bring an end resolution that both sides could work with. In early 1993, Armenian forces captured seven Azerbaijani-majority districts outside the enclave itself, threatening the involvement of other countries in the region. (Note: Four UN Security Council resolutions, passed in 1993, called on withdrawal of Armenian forces from the regions falling outside of the borders of the former NKAO.) By the end of the war in 1994, the Armenians were in full control of the enclave, in addition to surrounding Azerbaijani territories, most notably the Lachin corridor – a mountain pass that links Nagorno-Karabakh with mainland Armenia. A Russian-brokered ceasefire was signed in May 1994.

As a result of the conflict, approximately 724,000 Azerbaijanis were expelled from Armenia, Nagorno-Karabakh and the surrounding territories, while 300,000–500,000 Armenians living in Azerbaijan or Armenian border areas were displaced. After the end of the war and over a period of many years, regular peace talks between Armenia and Azerbaijan were mediated by the OSCE Minsk Group but failed to result in a peace treaty. This left the Nagorno-Karabakh area in a state of legal limbo, with the Republic of Artsakh remaining de facto independent but internationally unrecognized. Ongoing tensions persisted, with occasional outbreaks of armed clashes. Armenian forces occupied approximately 9% of Azerbaijan's territory outside the enclave until the Second Nagorno-Karabakh War in 2020. (Note: Numbers provided by journalist Thomas de Waal for the area of each rayon as well as the area of the Nagorno-Karabakh Oblast and the total area of Azerbaijan are (in km2): 1,936, Kalbajar; 1,835, Lachin; 802, Qubadlı; 1,050, Jabrayil; 707, Zangilan; 842, Aghdam; 462, Fuzuli; 75, exclaves; totaling 7,709 km^{2} (2,976 sq mi) or 8.9%.)

== Background ==
The territorial ownership of Nagorno-Karabakh today is heavily contested between Armenians and Azerbaijanis. The current conflict has its roots in events following World War I. Amid the dissolution of the Russian Empire in November 1917 and seizure of power by the Bolsheviks, the three main ethnic groups of the South Caucasus, Armenians, Azerbaijanis and Georgians, struggled to come to an agreement on the nature of political government in the region. An attempt at shared political authority in the form of the Transcaucasian Federation in the spring of 1918 came to naught in the face of an invasion by the forces of the Ottoman Empire. In May 1918, separate Armenian, Azerbaijani and Georgian national republics declared their formal independence from Russia.

=== Armenian–Azerbaijani war ===
Fighting soon broke out between the First Republic of Armenia and the Azerbaijan Democratic Republic in three regions in particular: Nakhchivan, Zangezur (today the Armenian provinces of Syunik and Vayotz Dzor) and Karabakh itself.

Armenia and Azerbaijan quarreled over the prospective boundaries of the three regions. The Armenians of Nagorno-Karabakh sought to unite the region with the Armenian republic. Following the defeat of the Ottoman Empire in World War I, forces led by Armenian general Andranik Ozanian entered Karabakh and made for the regional capital of Shusha in December 1918 when they were stopped by newly arrived British troops. The British commander suggested Andranik desist from marching on to Shusha and allow Armenia's and Azerbaijan's territorial disputes be left to the diplomats meeting at the forthcoming Paris Peace Conference. The British in the meantime decided to appoint Khosrov bey Sultanov, an Azerbaijani statesman, as provisional governor, but insisted that all sides await the decision made at the peace conference. Intermittent fighting broke out shortly after and accelerated following the British pull-out in early 1919. The violence culminated in Shusha's partial destruction by Azerbaijani forces in April 1920.

=== Soviet division ===
In April 1920, the Soviet Eleventh Army invaded the Caucasus and within two years, the Caucasian republics were formed into the Transcaucasian SFSR of the Soviet Union. The Bolsheviks created a seven-member committee, the Caucasus Bureau (known as the Kavburo). Established under the auspices of the People's Commissariat for Nationalities, the Kavburo was tasked with resolving a myriad of national-related issues in the Caucasus. On 4 July 1921 the committee voted 4–3 in favor of assigning Nagorno-Karabakh to the newly created Soviet Socialist Republic of Armenia, but a day later the Kavburo reversed its decision and voted to leave the region within the Azerbaijan SSR.

Historians to this day debate the reason for the Kavburo's last-minute reversal. Early scholarship argued that the decision was driven by a Soviet nationality policy that sought to create divisions within different ethnic and national groups. In addition to Nagorno-Karabakh, the Soviets also turned Nakhichevan, a region with a large Armenian minority population, into an exclave of Azerbaijan, separated by Armenia's border. More recent research has pointed to geography, Soviet economic policy, and ensuring close relations with Turkish nationalist leader Mustafa Kemal as factoring heavily in the Soviet decision-making.

In 1923, the Nagorno-Karabakh Autonomous Oblast (NKAO) was established with a 94% Armenian population, and its capital was shifted from Shusha to Khankendi, later renamed Stepanakert after the Armenian Bolshevik revolutionary Stepan Shahumian. However, the town’s original Armenian name, Vararakn (Armenian: Վարարակն, lit. 'rapid spring')., remained in use by Armenians until 1923.

Administrative map of the Caucasus in the USSR, 1957–1991

Over the following decades of Soviet rule, the Nagorno-Karabakh Armenians retained a strong desire to reunite with Armenia. A number of Armenian Communist Party officials attempted to persuade Moscow to reconsider the question, to little avail. In 1936, First Secretary of the Communist Party of Armenia Aghasi Khanjian was murdered by the deputy head (and soon head) of the NKVD Lavrentiy Beria after submitting Armenian grievances to Stalin, which included requests to return Nagorno-Karabakh and Nakhichevan to Armenia. The Armenians of the region frequently complained over the span of Soviet rule that their cultural and national rights were continually trampled upon by the Soviet Azerbaijani authorities in Baku.

== Prelude ==
=== Revival of the Karabakh issue ===
After Stalin's death, Armenian discontent began to be voiced. In 1963, around 2,500 Karabakh Armenians signed a petition calling for Karabakh to be put under Armenian control or to be transferred to Russia. The same year saw violent clashes in Stepanakert, leading to the death of 18 Armenians. In 1965 and 1977, there were large demonstrations in Yerevan calling to unify Karabakh with Armenia.

In 1985, Mikhail Gorbachev came to power as the new general secretary of the Soviet Union and began implementing plans to reform the Soviet Union through his policies of perestroika and glasnost. Many Armenians took advantage of the unprecedented opening of political expression offered by his policies and brought the issue of Nagorno-Karabakh back into the spotlight. Karabakh Armenian leaders complained that the region had neither Armenian language textbooks in schools nor in television broadcasting, and that Azerbaijan's Communist Party General Secretary Heydar Aliyev had attempted to "Azerify" the region by increasing the influence and number of Azerbaijanis living in Nagorno-Karabakh while at the same time pressuring its Armenian population to emigrate (Aliyev himself moved to Moscow in 1982, when was promoted to the position of the first deputy prime minister of the USSR). Over the course of seventy years, the Armenian population of Karabakh had dwindled to nearly three-quarters of the total population by the late 1980s.

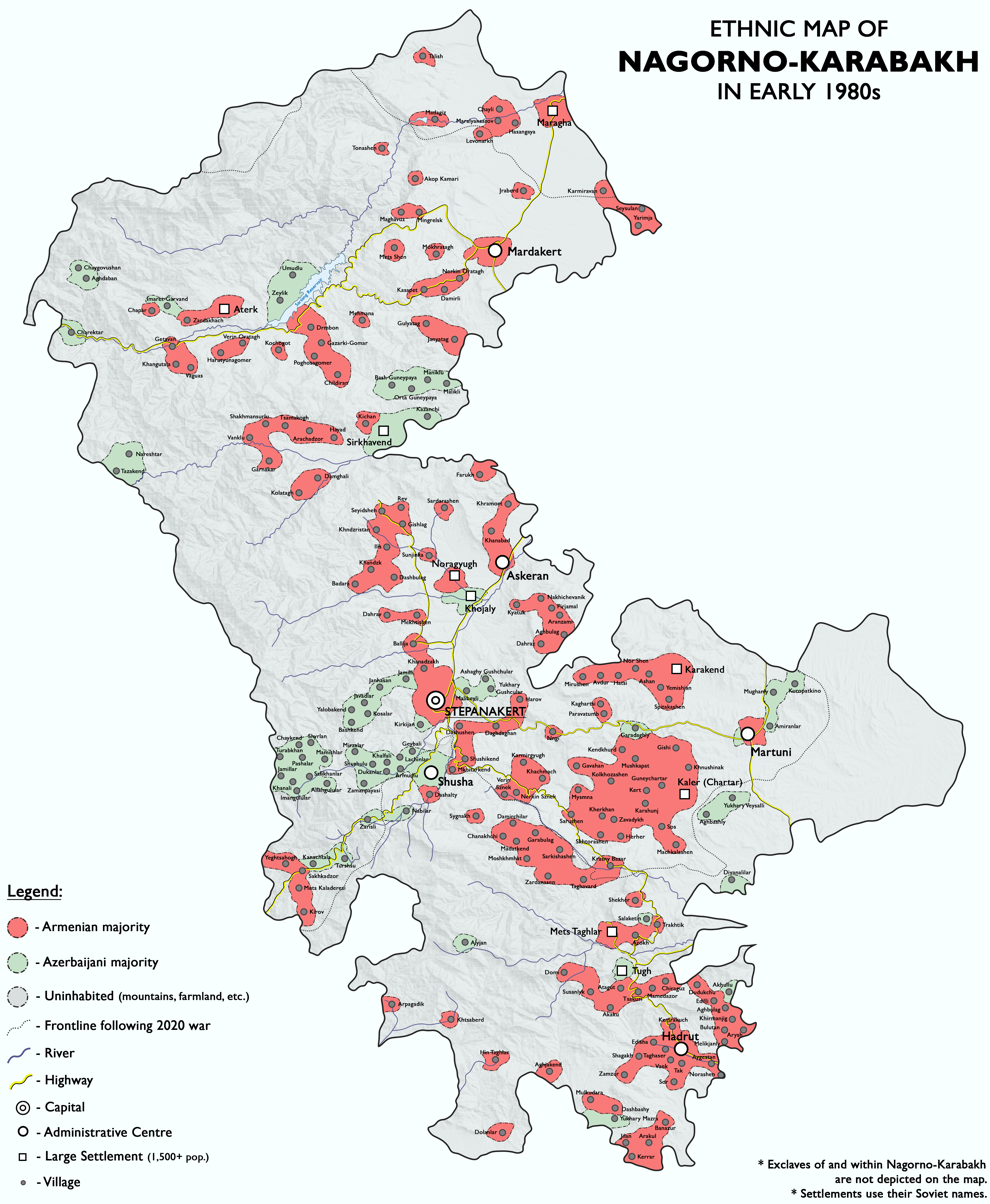
Ethnic situation in Nagorno-Karabakh in the early 1980s

In February 1988, Armenians began protesting and staging workers' strikes in Yerevan, demanding unification with the enclave. On 20 February 1988, the leaders of the regional Soviet of Karabakh voted in favour of unifying the autonomous region with Armenia in a resolution.

==== Operation Ring ====
In early 1991, President Gorbachev held a special countrywide referendum called the Union Treaty which would decide if the Soviet republics would remain together. Newly elected non-communist leaders had come to power in the Soviet republics, including Boris Yeltsin in Russia (Gorbachev remained the president of the Soviet Union), Levon Ter-Petrosyan in Armenia, and Ayaz Mutalibov in Azerbaijan. Armenia and five other republics boycotted the referendum (Armenia declared its independence from the Soviet Union on 23 August 1990, whereas Azerbaijan voted in favor of joining).

As many Armenians and Azerbaijanis in Karabakh began acquiring arms located in caches throughout Karabakh, Mutalibov turned to Gorbachev for support in launching a joint military operation in order to disarm Armenian militants in the region. Codenamed Operation Ring, Soviet forces, acting in conjunction with the local Azerbaijani OMON, entered villages in the Shahumyan region and began to forcibly expel their Armenian inhabitants. (Note: Mutalibov stated in this regard, "I remember how we with the help of Russians managed to cleanse from Armenians 30 villages around Gyandja... we were even close to the liberation of the whole Karabakh but our inner disagreements diminished our efforts" (translated from original Russian).) The operation involved the use of ground troops, armored vehicles and artillery. The deportations of the Armenian civilians was accompanied by allegations of gross human rights violations.

Operation Ring was viewed by many Soviet and Armenian government officials as a heavy-handed attempt by Moscow to intimidate the Armenian populace and forced them to give up their demands for unification. In the end, the operation proved counter-productive, with the violence only reinforcing the belief among Armenians that armed resistance remained the only solution to the conflict. The initial Armenian resistance inspired volunteers to start forming irregular volunteer detachments.

==== Early reconciliation efforts ====
In September 1991, Russian president Boris Yeltsin and Kazakhstan President Nursultan Nazarbayev tried their first hand at mediation efforts. After peace talks in Baku, Ganja, Stepanakert, and Yerevan on 20–23 September, the sides agreed to sign the Zheleznovodsk Communiqué in the Russian city of Zheleznovodsk taking the principles of territorial integrity, non-interference in internal affairs of sovereign states, observance of civil rights as a base of the agreement. The agreement was signed by Yeltsin, Nazarbayev, Mutalibov and Ter-Petrosyan. The peace talks came to an end, however, due to continuing bombardment and atrocities by Azerbaijani OMON in Stepanakert and Chapar in late September. with the final blow brought about by the shooting down of an Mi-8 helicopter near the village of Karakend in the Martuni District. The helicopter contained a peace mediating team made up of Russian and Kazakh observers and Azerbaijani high-ranking officials.

==== Implosion and Soviet dissolution ====
In late 1991, Armenian militia groups launched a number of operations to capture Armenian-populated villages seized by Azerbaijani OMON in May–July 1991. A number of Azerbaijani units burned these villages down as they withdrew from their positions. According to the Moscow-based Human Rights organization Memorial, at the same time, as a result of attacks by Armenian armed forces, several thousand residents of Azerbaijani villages in the former Shahumian, Hadrut, Martakert, Askeran and Martuni rayons of Azerbaijan left their homes. Some villages (e.g., Imereti and Gerevent) were burned by the militants. There were instances of violence against the civilian population (in particular, in the village Meshali).

Starting in late 1991, when the Azerbaijani side started its counter-offensive, the Armenian side began targeting Azerbaijani villages. According to Memorial, the villages Malibeyli and Gushchular, from which Azerbaijani forces regularly bombarded Stepanakert, were attacked by Armenians. Houses were burned and dozens of civilians were killed. Each side accused the other of using the villages for military purposes. On 19 December, interior ministry troops began to withdraw from Nagorno-Karabakh, completing their departure on 27 December. With the collapse of the Soviet Union and the withdrawal of interior ministry troops from Nagorno-Karabakh, the situation in the region spiraled out of control.

=== Weapons vacuum ===
As the dissolution of the Soviet Union accelerated in late 1991, both sides sought to acquire weaponry from military caches located throughout the region. The initial advantage tilted in Azerbaijan's favour. During the Cold War, Soviet military doctrine for the defense of the Caucasus had outlined a strategy where Armenia would become a combat zone in the event that NATO member Turkey invaded from the west. Thus, there were only three military divisions stationed in the Armenian SSR, and the country had no airfields, while Azerbaijan had a total of five divisions and five military air bases. Furthermore, Armenia had approximately 500 railroad cars of ammunition compared to Azerbaijan's 10,000.

As MVD forces began pulling out, they bequeathed the Armenians and Azerbaijanis a vast arsenal of ammunition and armored vehicles. The government forces initially sent by Gorbachev three years earlier were from other Soviet republics and many had no wish to stay too long. Most were poor, young conscripts and many simply sold their weapons for cash or even vodka to either side, some even trying to sell tanks and armored personnel carriers (APCs). The unsecured weapons caches led both sides to accuse Gorbachev of allowing the region to slip into conflict. The Azerbaijanis purchased a large quantity of vehicles, with the Foreign Ministry of Azerbaijan reporting in November 1993 the acquisition of 286 tanks, 842 armored vehicles and 386 artillery pieces during the power vacuum. The emergence of black markets helped facilitate the import of Western-made weaponry.

Most weaponry was of either Russian or former Eastern bloc manufacture; although, some improvisation was also made by both sides. Azerbaijan received substantial military aid and provisions from Turkey, Israel and numerous Middle East countries. The Armenian Diaspora donated a significant amount of aid to Armenia through the course of the war and even managed to push for legislation in the United States Congress to ban American military aid to Azerbaijan in 1992. (Note: Section 907 of the Freedom Support Act. Humanitarian aid was not explicitly banned but such supplies had to be routed through indirectly to aid organizations. On 25 January 2002, President George W. Bush signed a waiver that effectively repealed Section 907, thereby removing any restrictions that were barring the United States from sending military aid to Azerbaijan; military parity is maintained toward both sides.) While Azerbaijan charged the Russians with helping the Armenians, a reporter from Time magazine confirmed that "the Azerbaijani fighters in the region [were] far better equipped with Soviet military weaponry than their opponents."

Following Gorbachev's resignation as president of the USSR on 25 December 1991, the remaining republics, including Kazakhstan, Belarus and Russia itself, declared their independence and the Soviet Union ceased to exist on 31 December 1991. This dissolution removed any barriers that were keeping Armenia and Azerbaijan from waging a full-scale war. One month prior, on 26 November, the Azerbaijani Parliament had rescinded Karabakh's status as an autonomous region and renamed Stepanakert "Xankandi." In response, on 10 December, a referendum was held in Karabakh by parliamentary leaders (the local Azerbaijani community boycotted the referendum), with the Armenians voting overwhelmingly in favour of independence. On 6 January 1992, the region declared its independence from Azerbaijan.

The withdrawal of Soviet interior troops from Nagorno-Karabakh did not necessarily lead to the complete drawdown of former Soviet military power. In February 1992, the former Soviet republics came to form the Commonwealth of Independent States (CIS). While Azerbaijan abstained from joining, Armenia, fearing a possible invasion by Turkey, did, bringing the country under the organization's "collective security umbrella". In January 1992, CIS forces established their new headquarters at Stepanakert and took up an active role in peacekeeping. The CIS incorporated older Soviet formations, including the 366th Guards Motor Rifle Regiment and elements of the Soviet 4th Army the longtime Ground Forces garrison in the Azerbaijani SSR.

=== Building armies ===
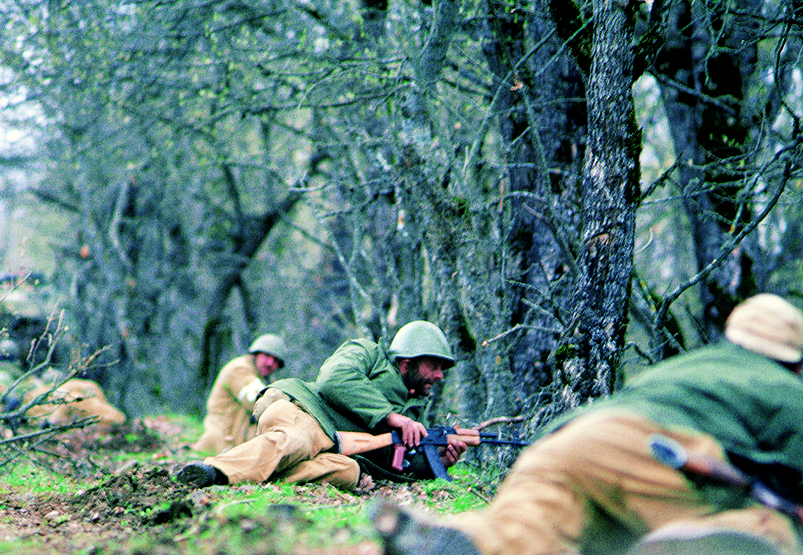
Armenian soldiers in Karabakh, 1994, wearing Soviet Army combat helmets and wielding AK-74 assault rifles

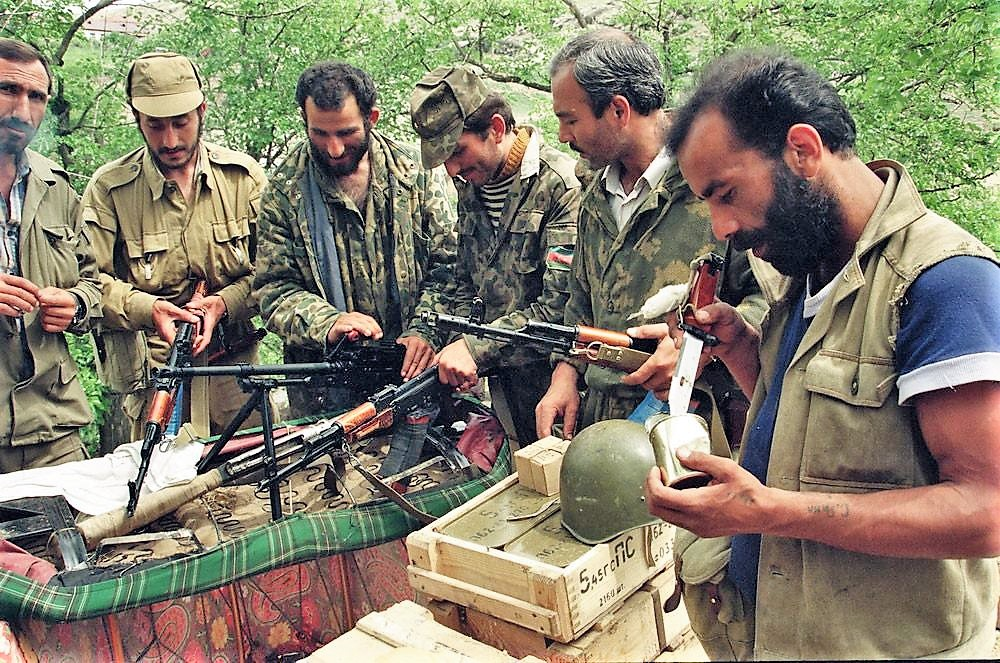
Azerbaijani soldiers during the war, 1992

Sporadic battles between Armenians and Azerbaijanis intensified after Operation Ring. Thousands of volunteers joined the new armies Armenia and Azerbaijan were trying to build from the ground up. In addition to the formation of regular army units, in Armenia many men volunteered to join detachments (jokats), units of about forty men, which, combined with several others, were placed under the command of a lieutenant colonel. Many styled themselves in the mold of late nineteenth- and early twentieth-century Armenian revolutionary figures, such as Andranik Ozanian and Garegin Nzhdeh, who had fought against the Ottoman Empire and Azerbaijan Democratic Republic. According to a biographer of one of the men who served in these units, the detachments lacked organization at the outset of the war, often choosing to attack or defend certain targets and areas without much coordination. Insubordination was common, as many men simply chose not to show up, looted the belongings of dead soldiers, and sold supplies, such as diesel oil intended for armoured vehicles, on the black market. Some former troops in the Soviet military offered their services to both sides. One of the most prominent officers to serve on the Armenian side, for example, was General Anatoly Zinevich, who remained in Nagorno-Karabakh for five years (1992–1997) and was involved in the planning and implementation of many operations of the Armenian forces. By the end of the war, he held the position of Chief of Staff of the Republic of Artsakh armed forces. Women were allowed to enlist in the Nagorno-Karabakh military, sometimes taking part in the fighting but mainly serving in auxiliary roles such as providing first-aid and evacuating wounded men from the battlefield.

Azerbaijan's military functioned in much the same manner. It was better organized during the first years of the war. The Azerbaijan government carried out conscription and many Azerbaijanis enthusiastically enlisted for combat in the first months after the Soviet collapse. Azerbaijan's national army consisted of roughly 30,000 men, as well as nearly 10,000 in its OMON paramilitary force and several thousand volunteers from the Popular Front. Suret Huseynov, a wealthy Azerbaijani, improvised by creating his own military brigade, the 709th, and purchased weapons and vehicles from the former Soviet 23rd Motor Rifle Division. Isgandar Hamidov's Grey Wolves (bozqurt) Brigade was another privately funded military outfit. According to Mariana Budjeryn's 2022 book Inheriting the Bomb, in winter 1990 Azerbaijani nationalist militias even attempted to secure or prevent the Soviet military from removing tactical nuclear weapons stationed on Azerbaijani territory.

The Azerbaijani government sought foreign support as well, flush with money from oil revenues, it hired foreign mercenaries. The military further retained the services of Gulbuddin Hekmatyar, a veteran of the Afghan war against the Soviets. Recruitment took place mostly in Peshawar by commander Fazle Haq Mujahid and several groups were dispatched to Azerbaijan for different duties. According to Washington post, who refers to unidentified diplomats, the Afghans started arriving in August 1993 after Azerbaijani Deputy Interior Minister Roshan Jivadov had visited Afghanistan and the deployment was approved by Gulbuddin Hekmatyar.

The estimated manpower and equipment of each side in 1993–1994 was:

	Armenia and Nagorno-Karabakh	Azerbaijan
Military personnel	40,000	42,000
Artillery	177–187 (160–170 + 17)	388–395
Tanks	90–173 (77–160 + 13)	436–458
Armored personnel carriers	290–360 (150–240 + 120)	558–1,264
Armored fighting vehicles	39–200 + N/A	389–480
Fighter aircraft	3 + N/A	63–170
Helicopters	13 + N/A	45–51

Because Armenia did not have any secure treaty guarantees like those it would conclude with Russia (in 1997 and 2010) and the CSTO, it had to divide some of its own forces for the defense of its western border with Turkey. For the duration of the war, most of the military personnel and equipment of the Republic of Armenia stayed in the country proper.

In an overall military comparison, the number of men eligible for military service in Armenia, in the age group of 17–32, totalled 550,000, while in Azerbaijan it reached 1.3 million. Most men on both sides had served in the Soviet army and so had some form of military experience prior to the conflict, including men who had served tours of duty in Afghanistan. Among Karabakh Armenians, about 60% had served in the Soviet amy. Most Azerbaijanis were often subject to discrimination during their service in the Soviet military and relegated to work in construction battalions rather than fighting corps. Despite the presence of two military academies, including a naval school in Azerbaijan, the lack of such military experience was one factor that left Azerbaijan unprepared for the war.

== War ==
=== Stepanakert under siege ===
During the winter of 1991–1992 Stepanakert, the capital of Nagorno-Karabakh was blockaded by Azerbaijani forces and many civilian targets in the city were intentionally bombarded by artillery and aircraft. The bombardment of Stepanakert and adjacent Armenian-held towns and villages during the blockade caused widespread destruction and the interior minister of Nagorno-Karabakh claimed that 169 Armenians died between October 1991 and April 1992. Azerbaijan used weapons such as the BM-21 Grad multiple-launch rocket system during the bombardment. The indiscriminate shelling and aerial attacks, terrorized the civilian population and destroyed numerous civilian buildings, including homes, hospitals and other non-legitimate military targets.

Human Rights Watch reported that main bases used by Azerbaijani armed forces for the bombardment of Stepanakert were the towns of Khojaly and Shusha. In February 1992, Khojaly was captured by a mixed force of ethnic Armenians and, according to international observers, the 366th CIS Regiment. After its capture, Khojaly became the site of the largest massacre to occur during the First Nagorno-Karabakh War. Human Rights Watch estimates that at least 161 Azerbaijani civilians, as well as a number of unarmed hors de combat soldiers, were killed as they fled the town. The siege was finally lifted a few months later, in May 1992, when Armenian forces scored a decisive victory by capturing Shusha.

=== Early Armenian offensives ===
==== Khojaly ====
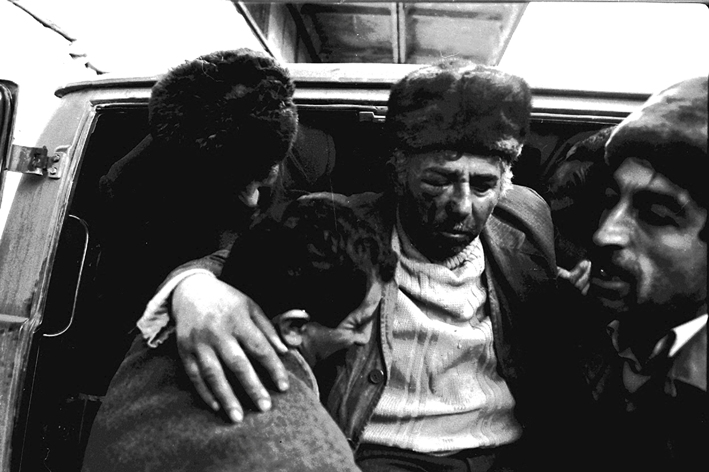
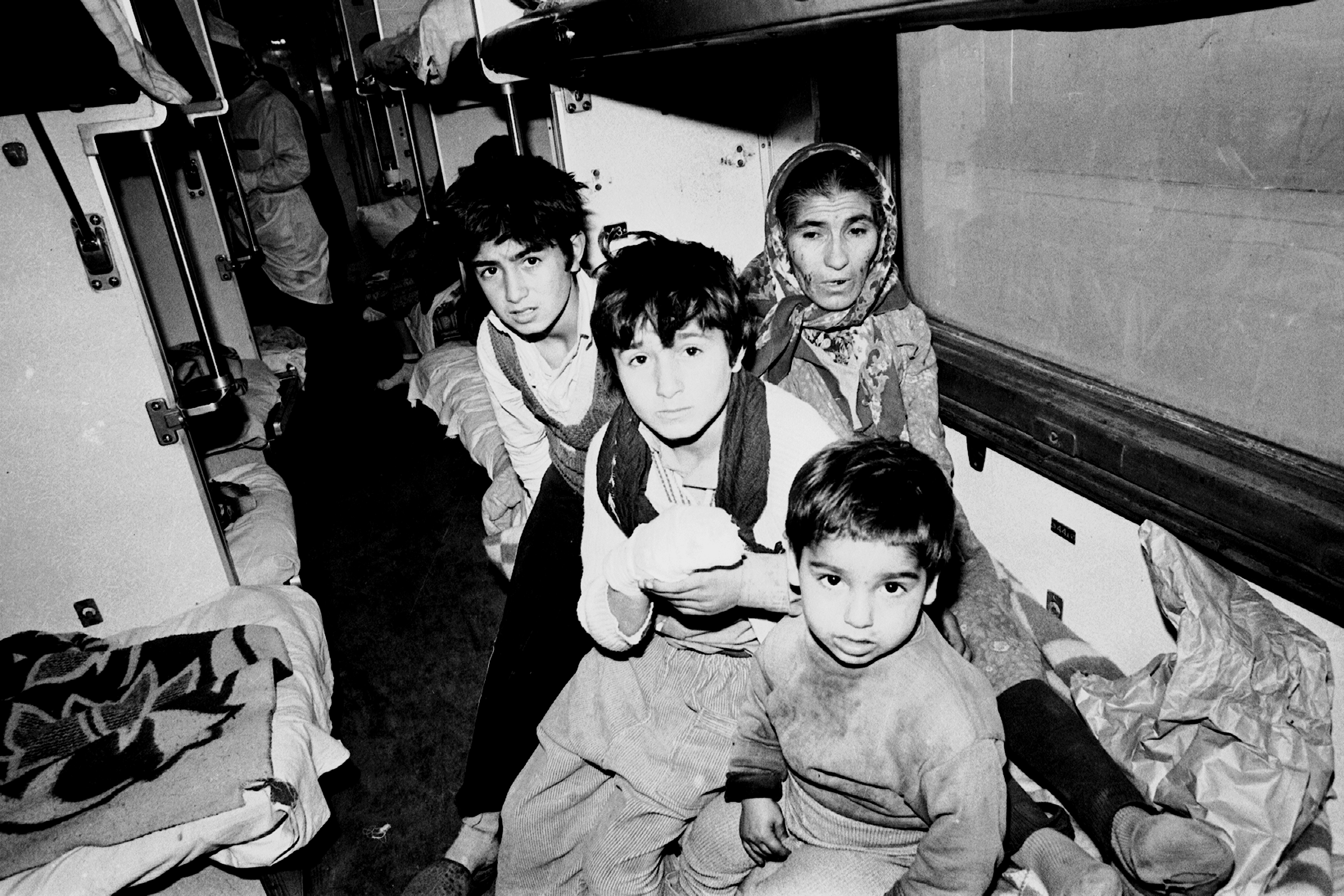
Azerbaijani refugees from Khojaly

On 2 January 1992 Ayaz Mutalibov assumed the presidency of Azerbaijan. Officially, the newly created Republic of Armenia publicly denied any involvement in providing any weapons, fuel, food, or other logistics to the secessionists in Nagorno-Karabakh. Ter-Petrosyan later did admit to supplying them with logistical supplies and paying the salaries of the separatists, but denied sending any of its own men into combat. Armenia faced a debilitating blockade by the now Republic of Azerbaijan, as well as pressure from neighbouring Turkey, which decided to side with Azerbaijan and build a closer relationship with it. In early February, the Azerbaijani villages of Malıbəyli, Karadagly and Agdaban were conquered and their population evicted, leading to at least 99 civilian deaths and 140 wounded.

The only land connection Armenia had with Karabakh was through the narrow, mountainous Lachin corridor which could only be reached by helicopters. The region's only airport was in Khojaly, a small town 7 kilometres (4 miles) north of Stepanakert and a population of somewhere between 6,000 and 10,000 people. Khojaly had been serving as an artillery base from which Grad rockets were launched upon the civilian population of capital Stepanakert: On some days as many as 400 Grad rockets rained down on Armenian multi-story apartments. By late February, the Armenian forces reportedly warned about the upcoming attack and issued an ultimatum that unless the Azerbaijanis stopped the shelling from Khojaly they would seize the town. (Note: The HRW report quotes the testimony of an Azerbaijani woman: "According to A.H., an Azerbaijani woman interviewed by Helsinki Watch in Baku, 'After Armenians seized Malybeyli, they made an ultimatum to Khojaly ... and that Khojaly people had better leave with white flag. Alif Gajiev [the head of the militia in Khojaly] told us this on 15 February, but this didn't frighten me or other people. We never believed they could occupy Khojaly'")

By late February, Khojaly had largely been cut off. On 26 February, Armenian forces, with the aid of some armored vehicles from the 366th, mounted an offensive to capture Khojaly. According to the Azerbaijani side and the affirmation of other sources including Human Rights Watch, the Moscow-based human rights organization Memorial and the biography of a leading Armenian commander, Monte Melkonian, documented and published by his brother, after Armenian forces captured Khojaly, they killed several hundred civilians evacuating from the town. Armenian forces had previously stated they would attack the city and leave a land corridor for them to escape through. When the attack began, the attacking Armenian force easily outnumbered and overwhelmed the defenders who along with the civilians attempted to retreat north to the Azerbaijani held city of Agdam. The airport's runway was found to have been intentionally destroyed, rendering it temporarily useless. The attacking forces then went on to pursue those fleeing through the corridor and opened fire upon them, killing scores of civilians. Facing charges of an intentional massacre of civilians by international groups, Armenian government officials denied the occurrence of a massacre and asserted an objective of silencing the artillery coming from Khojaly. (Note: The Armenian government denies that a deliberate massacre took place in Khojaly and maintains most of the civilians were killed in a crossfire shooting between Armenian and Azerbaijani troops.)

An exact body count was never ascertained but conservative estimates have placed the number to 485. The official death toll according to Azerbaijani authorities for casualties suffered during the events of 25–26 February is 613 civilians, of them 106 women and 83 children. On 3 March 1992, the Boston Globe reported over 1,000 people had been slain over four years of conflict. It quoted the mayor of Khojaly, Elmar Mamedov, as also saying 200 more were missing, 300 were held hostage and 200 injured in the fighting. A report published in 1992 by the human rights organization Helsinki Watch stated that their inquiry found that the Azerbaijani OMON and "the militia, still in uniform and some still carrying their guns, were interspersed with the masses of civilians" which may have been the reason why Armenian troops fired upon them.

Under pressure from the APF due to the mismanagement of the defence of Khojaly and the safety of its inhabitants, Mutalibov was forced to submit his resignation to the National Assembly of Azerbaijan.

==== Capture of Shusha ====
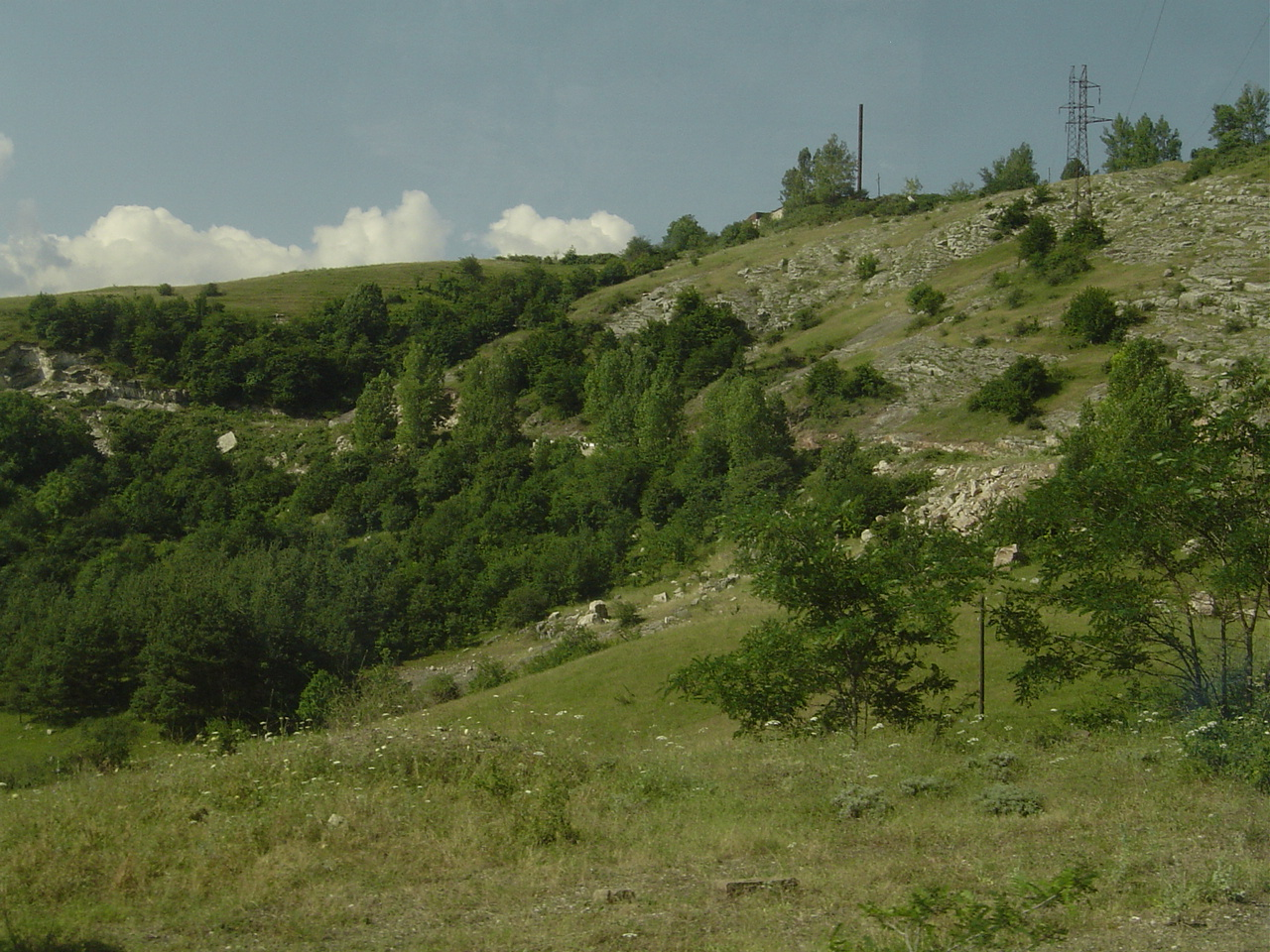
The road leading up to Shusha was the scene of a battle between Armenian and Azerbaijani armored vehicles.

On 26 January 1992, the Azerbaijani forces stationed in Shusha encircled and attacked the nearby Armenian village Karintak (located on the way from Shusha to Stepanakert) in an attempt to capture it. This operation was conducted by Azerbaijan's then-defence minister Tajedin Mekhtiev and was supposed to prepare the ground for a future attack on Stepanakert. The operation failed as the villagers and the Armenian fighters strongly retaliated. Mekhtiev was ambushed and up to 70 Azeri soldiers died. After this debacle, Mekhtiev left Shusha and was fired as defence minister.

On 28 March, Azerbaijani troops deployed to attack Stepanakert, attacked Armenian positions above the village Kərkicahan from the village of Dzhangasan. During the afternoon of the next day, Azerbaijani units took up positions in close proximity to the city, but were quickly repulsed by the Armenians.

In the ensuing months after the capture of Khojaly, Azerbaijani commanders holding out in the region's last bastion of Shusha began a large-scale artillery bombardment with Grad rocket launchers against Stepanakert. By April, the shelling had forced many of the 50,000 people living in Stepanakert to seek refuge in underground bunkers and basements. Facing ground incursions near the city's outlying areas, military leaders in Nagorno-Karabakh organized an offensive to take the town.

On 8 May a force of several hundred Armenian troops accompanied by tanks and helicopters attacked Shusha. Fierce fighting took place in the town's streets and several hundred men were killed on both sides. Although the Armenians were outnumbered and outgunned by the Azerbaijani Army, they managed to capture the town and force the Azerbaijanis to retreat on 9 May.

The capture of Shusha resonated loudly in neighbouring Turkey. Its relations with Armenia had grown better after it had declared its independence from the Soviet Union; they gradually worsened as a result of Armenia's gains in the Nagorno-Karabakh region. Turkey's prime minister Suleyman Demirel said that he was under intense pressure by his people to have his country intervene and aid Azerbaijan. Demirel was opposed to such an intervention, saying that Turkey's entrance into the war would trigger an even greater Muslim-Christian conflict (Turkey is overwhelmingly Muslim).

Turkey sent mercenary infantry composed of Turkish nationalists to Azerbaijan and also contributed substantial military aid and advisers. In addition, Turkey also blockaded supplies from being transferred to Armenia, including humanitarian aid. In May 1992, the military commander of the CIS forces, Marshal Yevgeny Shaposhnikov, issued a warning to Western nations, especially the United States, to not interfere with the conflict in the Caucasus, stating it would "place us [the Commonwealth] on the verge of a third world war and that cannot be allowed".

==== Lachin corridor ====
The Azerbaijani parliament blamed Yaqub Mammadov, then acting president of Azerbaijan, for Shusha's loss, and removed him from power. This cleared Mutalibov of any responsibility after the loss of Khojaly, and paved the way for reinstatement him as president on 15 May 1992. Many Azerbaijanis objected to this move, viewing as an attempt to forestall parliamentary elections due in June of that year. The Azerbaijani parliament at that time was made up of former leaders from the country's communist regime, and the losses of Khojaly and Shusha led to further agitation for free elections.

To add to the turmoil, on 18 May Armenian forces launched an offensive to take the town of Lachin, situated along a narrow corridor that separated Armenia proper from Nagorno-Karabakh. The town was poorly guarded, and the next day Armenian forces took control of the town and opened a humanitarian corridor known as the Lachin corridor that linked the Nagorno-Karabakh to Armenia. The capture of Lachin allowed an overland route for supply convoys between Nagorno-Karabakh and Armenia, thereby providing relief against the blockade imposed by Azerbaijan.

The loss of Lachin was the final blow to Mutalibov's regime. Demonstrations were held despite Mutalibov's ban and an armed coup was staged by Popular Front activists. Fighting between government forces and Popular Front supporters escalated as the political opposition seized the parliament building in Baku as well as the airport and presidential office. On 16 June 1992 Abulfaz Elchibey was elected leader of Azerbaijan with many political leaders from the Azerbaijan Popular Front Party were elected into the parliament. The instigators lambasted Mutalibov as an undedicated and weak leader in the war in Karabakh. Elchibey was staunchly opposed to asking for help from Russians, preferring instead to build closer ties with Turkey.

There were times when the fighting also spilled outside the Nagorno-Karabakh region. Nakhchivan, for example, was shelled by Armenian troops in May 1992.

=== Escalation ===
==== Azerbaijani offensive in June 1992 ====
On 12 June 1992, the Azeri military, along with Huseynov's own brigade, used a large number of tanks, armored personnel carriers and attack helicopters to launch a three-day offensive from the relatively unguarded region of Shahumian, north of Nagorno-Karabakh, in the process taking back several dozen villages in the Shahumian region originally held by Armenian forces. Another reason the front collapsed so effortlessly was because it was manned by the volunteer detachments from Armenia, having abandoned their positions to return to Armenia proper after the capture of Lachin. The offensive prompted the Armenian government to openly threaten Azerbaijan that it would overtly intervene and assist the separatists fighting in Karabakh.

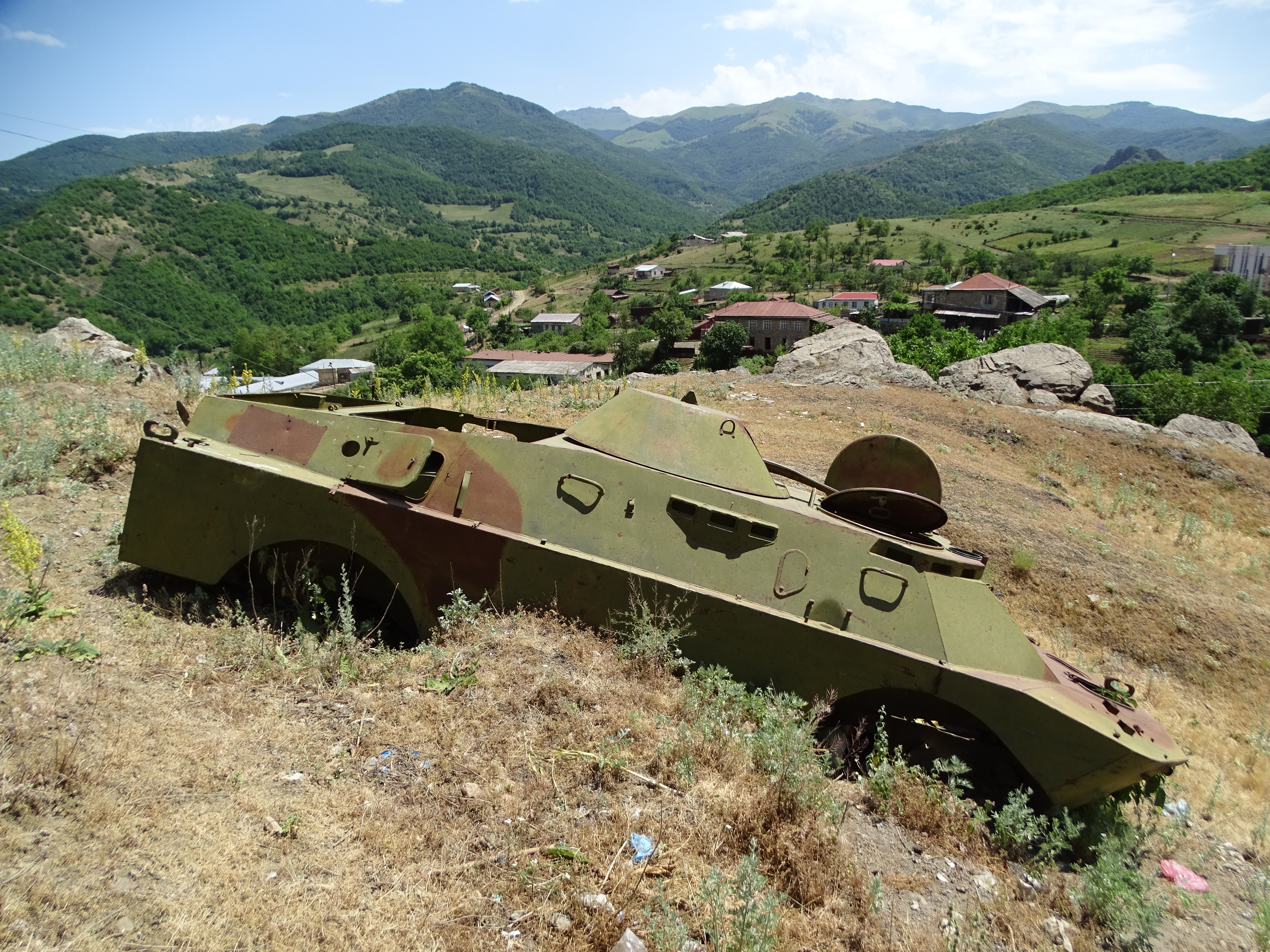
A derelict BRDM-2 in Dashalty

The scale of the Azerbaijani offensive prompted the Armenian government to threaten Azerbaijan with directly intervening and assisting the separatists. The assault forced Armenian forces to retreat south towards Stepanakert, where Karabakh commanders contemplated destroying a vital hydroelectric dam in the Martakert region if the offensive was not halted. An estimated 30,000 Armenian refugees were also forced to flee to the capital as the assaulting forces had taken back nearly half of Nagorno-Karabakh. However, the offensive soon ground to a halt as helicopter gunships began picking away at the columns.

On 18 June 1992, a state of emergency was announced throughout the NKR. On 15 August, the Committee for State Defense of the NKR was created, headed by Robert Kocharyan and later by Serzh Sargsyan. Partial mobilization was called for, which covered sergeants and privates in the NKR, NKR men available for military service aged 18–40, officers up to the age of 50 and women with previous military training. Many of the crew members of the armored units in the offensive belonged to the Russian 23rd Division of the 4th Army, based out of Ganja and, ironically, as were the units that eventually stopped them. According to an Armenian government official, they were able to persuade Russian military units to bombard and effectively halt the advance within a few days; allowing the Armenian government to recuperate for the losses and mount a counteroffensive to restore the original lines of the front.

==== Renewed peace talks ====
New efforts at peace talks were initiated by Iranian president Akbar Hashemi Rafsanjani in the first half of 1992, after the events in Khojaly and the resignation of Azerbaijani president Ayaz Mutallibov. Iranian diplomats conducted shuttle diplomacy and were able to bring the new president of Azerbaijan Yaqub Mammadov and President of Armenia Levon Ter-Petrosian to Tehran for bilateral talks on 7 May 1992. The Tehran Communiqué was signed by Mammadov, Ter-Petrosian and Rafsanjani following the agreement of the parties to international legal norms, stability of borders and to deal with the refugee crisis. The peace efforts were disrupted on the next day when Armenian troops captured the town of Shusha and completely failed following the capture of Lachin on 18 May.

In mid-1992, the CSCE (later to become the Organization for Security and Co-operation in Europe), created the Minsk Group in Helsinki which comprised eleven nations and was co-chaired by France, Russia and the United States with the purpose of mediating a peace deal with Armenia and Azerbaijan. In their annual summit in 1992, the organization failed to address and solve the many new problems that had arisen since the Soviet Union collapsed, much less the Karabakh conflict. The wars in Yugoslavia, Moldova's war with the breakaway republic of Transnistria, the secessionist movement in Chechnya and Georgia's renewed disputes with Russia, Abkhazia, and Ossetia were all top agenda issues that involved various ethnic groups fighting each other.

The CSCE proposed the use of NATO and CIS peacekeepers to monitor ceasefires and protect shipments of humanitarian aid being sent to displaced refugees. Several ceasefires were put into effect after the June offensive, but the implementation of a European peacekeeping force, endorsed by Armenia, never came to fruition. The idea of sending 100 international observers to Karabakh was once raised but talks broke down completely between Armenian and Azerbaijani leaders in July. Russia was especially opposed to allowing a multinational peacekeeping force from NATO to entering the Caucasus, seeing it as a move that encroached on its "backyard".

==== The southern front ====
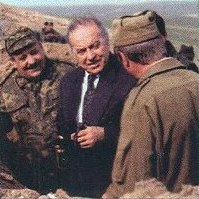
Heydar Aliyev with Azerbaijani soldiers in a trench

In late June, a new, smaller Azerbaijani offensive was planned, this time against the town of Martuni in the southeastern half of Karabakh. The attack force consisted of several dozen tanks and armored fighting vehicles along with a complement of several infantry companies massing along the Machkalashen and Jardar fronts near Martuni and Krasnyy Bazar. Martuni's regimental commander, Monte Melkonian, although lacking heavy armor, managed to beat back repeated assaults by the Azerbaijani forces.

In late August 1992, Nagorno-Karabakh's government was in order disorder, and its members resigned on 17 August. Power was subsequently assumed by a council called the State Defense Committee and chaired by Robert Kocharyan. The committee would temporarily govern the enclave until war's end. At the same time, Azerbaijan also launched attacks by fixed-wing aircraft, often bombing civilian targets. Kocharyan accused Azerbaijan of intentionally targeting civilians in the aerial campaign. He also blamed Russia for allowing its army's weapons stockpiles to be sold or transferred to Azerbaijan. (Note: In a Russian documentary titled The Russian Mercenaries Who Fought in Karabakh, produced and broadcast by REN TV, several captured Russian and Ukrainian pilots hired to fly for Azerbaijan confess that they were ordered to attack civilian targets.)

==== Winter thaw ====
As winter approached, both sides largely abstained from launching full-scale offensives so as to preserve resources, such as gas and electricity, for domestic use. Despite the opening of an economic highway to the residents living in Karabakh, both Armenia and the enclave suffered a great deal due to the economic blockades imposed by Azerbaijan. While not completely shut off, material aid sent through Turkey arrived sporadically.

Experiencing both food shortages and power shortages, after the shutting down of the Metsamor nuclear power plant, Armenia's economic outlook appeared bleak: in Georgia, a new bout of civil wars against separatists in Abkhazia and Ossetia began, and supply convoys were raided and the only oil pipeline leading from Russia to Armenia was repeatedly destroyed. As in 1991–1992, the 1992–1993 winter was especially cold, as many families throughout Armenia and Karabakh were left without heating and hot water.

Grain had become difficult to procure. The Armenian Diaspora raised money and donated supplies to Armenia. In December, two shipments of 33,000 tons of grain and 150 tons of infant formula arrived from the United States via the Black Sea port of Batumi, Georgia. In February 1993, the European Community sent 4.5 million ECUs to Armenia. Iran also helped by providing power and electricity to Armenian. Elchibey's acrimonious stance toward Iran and provocative remarks about unifying with Iran's Azerbaijani minority alienated relations between the two countries.

Azerbaijanis were displaced as internal and international refugees were forced to live in makeshift camps provided by both the Azerbaijan government and Iran. The International Red Cross also distributed blankets to the Azerbaijanis and noted that by December, enough food was being allocated for the refugees. Azerbaijan also struggled to rehabilitate its petroleum industry, the country's chief export. Its oil refineries were not generating at full capacity and production quotas fell well short of estimates. In 1965, the oil fields in Baku were producing 21.5 million tons of oil annually; by 1988, that number had dropped down to almost 3.3 million. Outdated Soviet refinery equipment and a reluctance by Western oil companies to invest in a war region where pipelines would routinely be destroyed prevented Azerbaijan from fully exploiting its oil wealth.

=== Mid-1993 ===
==== The northern front ====
Despite a brutal winter, both sides looked to the new year to break the inertia of the war. Azerbaijan's president Elchibey expressed optimism toward bringing solution to the conflict with Armenia's Ter-Petrosyan. Glimmers of such hope quickly began to fade in January 1993, despite the calls for a new ceasefire by Boris Yeltsin and George H. W. Bush. Armenian forces launched a new round of attacks that overran villages in northern Karabakh that had been held by the Azerbaijanis since the previous year. After Armenian losses in 1992, Russia started massive armament shipments to Armenia in the following year. Russia supplied Armenia with arms with a total cost of US$1 billion in value in 1993. According to Russian general Lev Rokhlin, Russians supplied Armenians with such massive arms shipment in return for "money, personal contacts and lots of vodkas".

Frustration over these military defeats took a toll on the domestic front in Azerbaijan. Azerbaijan's military had grown more desperate and defence minister Gaziev and Huseynov's brigade turned to Russian help, a move which ran against Elchibey's policies and was construed as insubordination. Political infighting and arguments about where to shift military units between the country's ministry of the interior Isgandar Hamidov and Gaziev led to the latter's resignation on 20 February. Armenia was similarly wracked by political turmoil and growing Armenian dissension against President Ter-Petrosyan.

==== Kalbajar ====
An Armenian engineer repairing a captured Azerbaijani tank. Note the crescent emblem on the turret of the tank.

Situated west of northern Karabakh, outside the official boundaries of the region, was the rayon of Kalbajar, which bordered Armenia. With a population of about 60,000, the several dozen villages were made up of Azerbaijani and Kurds. In March 1993, the Armenian-held areas near the Sarsang reservoir in Mardakert were reported to have been coming under attack by the Azerbaijanis. After successfully defending the Martuni region, Melkonian's fighters were tasked to move to capture the region of Kalbajar, where the incursions and artillery shelling were said to have been coming from.

Scant military opposition by the Azerbaijanis allowed Melkonian's fighters to gain a foothold in the region and along the way capture several abandoned armored vehicles and tanks. At 2:45 pm, on 2 April, Armenian forces from two directions advanced toward Kalbajar in an attack that struck Azerbaijani armor and troops entrenched near the Ganja-Kalbajar intersection. Azerbaijani forces were unable to halt the advances made by Armenian armor and were wiped out completely. The second attack toward Kalbajar also quickly overran the defenders. By 3 April, Armenian forces were in possession of Kalbajar.

On 30 April, the United Nations Security Council (UNSC) passed Resolution 822, co-sponsored by Turkey and Pakistan, demanding the immediate cessation of all hostilities and the withdrawal of all occupying forces from Kalbajar. Human Rights Watch concluded that during the Kalbajar offensive Armenian forces committed numerous violations of the rules of war, including the forcible exodus of a civilian population, indiscriminate fire, and taking of hostages.

The political repercussions were also felt in Azerbaijan when Huseynov embarked on his "march to Baku". Frustrated with what he felt was Elchibey's incompetence and demotion from his rank of colonel, his brigade advanced in early June from its base in Ganja toward Baku with the explicit aim of unseating the president. Elchibey stepped down from office on 18 June and power was assumed by then parliamentary member Heydar Aliyev. On 1 July, Huseynov was appointed prime minister of Azerbaijan. As acting president, Aliyev disbanded 33 voluntary battalions of the Popular Front, which he deemed politically unreliable.

==== Agdam, Fuzuli, Jabrail and Zangilan ====
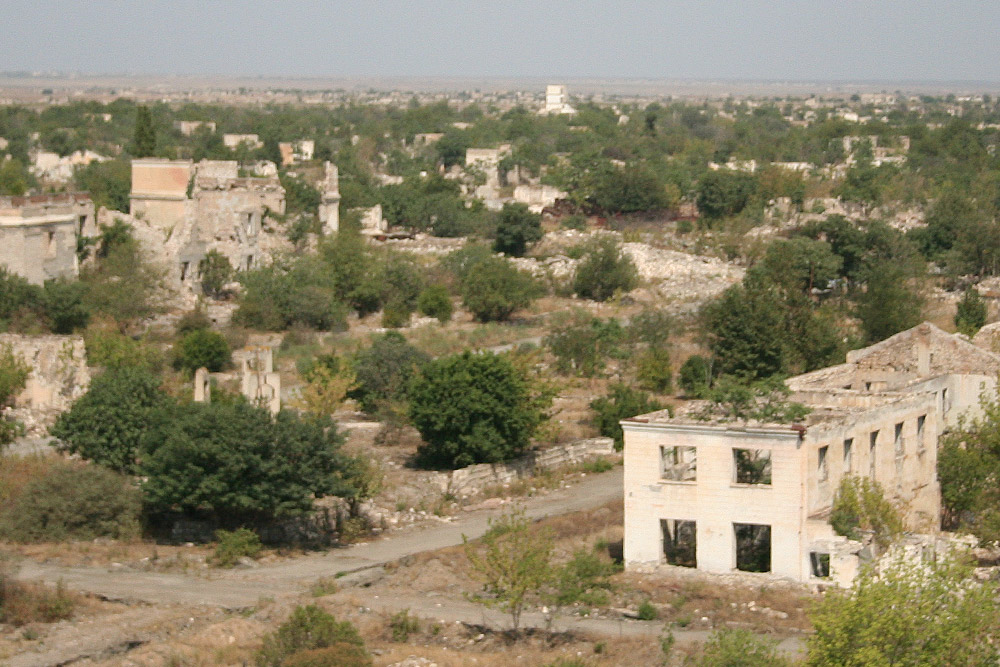
Ruins of Aghdam in 2009.

The Armenian side took advantage of the turmoil in Baku, which had left the Karabakh front almost undefended. The following four months of political instability in Azerbaijan led to the loss of control over five districts, as well as the north of Nagorno-Karabakh. Azerbaijani military forces were unable to put up much resistance in the face of Armenian advances and abandoned most of their positions with little resistance. In late June 1993, they were driven out from Mardakert, losing their final foothold of the enclave. By July, Armenian forces were seen preparing for to attack and capture Agdam, another district that fell outside of Nagorno-Karabakh, with the aim of widening a cordon that would keep towns and villages and their positions out of the range of Azerbaijani artillery. (Note: The sincerity of Armenian claims to establish security were called into question by observers at the time and it was said that Karabakh forces were wantonly seizing the territories surrounding the enclave, though periodic fighting between the two sides in the region were reported to have taken place in the months before the offensives took place.)

On 4 July Armenian forces commenced an artillery bombardment on Agdam, destroying many parts of the town. Soldiers, along with civilians, began to evacuate Agdam. Facing military collapse, Aliyev resumed talks with the Karabakh government and Minsk Group officials. In mid-August, Armenians massed a force to take Fuzuli and Jebrail, two regions in Azerbaijan proper.

In the wake of the Armenian offensive in these two regions, Turkish prime minister Tansu Çiller demanded that the Armenians withdraw and issued a warning to the Armenian government not to undertake any offensives in Nakhichevan. Thousands of Turkish troops were sent to the border between Turkey and Armenia in early September. Russian forces in Armenia, in turn, likewise mobilized in the country's northwest border. (Note: During the Russian constitutional crisis of 1993, one of the coup's leaders against Russian president Yeltsin, Chechen Ruslan Khasbulatov, was reported by the US and French intelligence agencies to preparing Russian troop withdrawals from Armenia if the coup succeeded. An estimated 23,000 Russian soldiers were stationed in Armenia on the border with Turkey. Çiller was reported by the agencies to be in talks with Khasbulatov to approve a Turkish incursion into Armenia under the pretext of pursuing PKK guerrillas, something it had done earlier that year in northern Iraq. Russian armed forces crushed the coup.)

By early September, Azerbaijani forces were in a state of complete disarray. Many of the heavy weapons they had received and bought from the Russians were either taken out of action or abandoned during battles. Since the June 1992 offensive, Armenian forces had captured dozens of tanks, light armor, and artillery from Azerbaijan. According to Monte Melkonian, his forces in Martuni alone had captured or destroyed a total of 55 T-72s, 24 BMP-2s, 15 APCs and 25 heavy artillery pieces since the June 1992 Goranboy offensive. Serzh Sargsyan, the then-military leader of the Karabakh armed forces, calculated a total of 156 tanks captured over the course of the war.

Azerbaijan was so desperate for manpower that Aliyev recruited 1,000–1,500 mujahadeen fighters from Afghanistan. Azerbaijan's government refuted the claim at the time, although the Armenian side provided correspondence and photographs to support their presence in the region. A shady American petroleum company, MEGA OIL, was also alleged to have sent American military trainers to Azerbaijan in order to acquire oil drilling rights in the country.

=== Air war over Karabakh ===
The aerial warfare in Karabakh involved primarily fighter jets and attack helicopters. The primary transport helicopters of the war were the Mi-8 and its cousin, the Mi-17 and were used extensively by both sides. The most widely used helicopter gunship by both sides was the Soviet-made Mi-24 Krokodil. (Note: Under the protocols of the Tashkent Agreement signed in Uzbekistan in May 1992, the former Soviet republics were allocated a certain number of tanks, armored vehicles, and combat aircraft. The agreement allowed Armenia and Azerbaijan to have a total of 100 aircraft. In 1993 the Armenian Air Force possessed a fleet of 12 Mi-24s gunships, 9 Mil Mi-2s, and 13 Mi-8s transport helicopters. Azerbaijan's air force had a near-similar fleet of 15 Mi-24s, 7 Mi-2, 15 Mil Mi-6 and 13 Mi-8 utility helicopters.) Armenia's active air force at the time consisted of only two Su-25 ground support bombers, one of which was lost due to friendly fire. There were also several Su-22s and Su-17s; these ageing craft took a backseat for the duration of the war.

Azerbaijan's air force was composed of 45 combat aircraft which were often piloted by experienced Russian and Ukrainian mercenaries from the former Soviet military. They flew mission sorties over Karabakh with such sophisticated jets as the MiG-25 and Sukhoi Su-24 and with older-generation Soviet fighter bombers, such as the MiG-21. They were reported to have been paid a monthly salary of over 5,000 rubles and flew bombing campaigns from air force bases in Azerbaijan, often targeting Stepanakert. These pilots, like the men from the Soviet interior forces at the onset of the conflict, were also poor and took the jobs as a means of supporting their families. Several were shot down over the city by Armenian forces and according to one of the pilots' commanders, with assistance provided by the Russians. Many of these pilots risked the threat of execution by Armenian forces if they were shot down. The setup of the defence system severely hampered Azerbaijan's ability to carry out and launch more airstrikes.

Azerbaijani fighter jets attacked civilian airplanes too. An Armenian civil aviation Yak-40 plane traveling Stepanakert Airport to Yerevan with 34 passengers and crew was attacked by an Azerbaijani Su-25. Though suffering engine failure and a fire in rear of the plane, it eventually made a safe landing in Armenian territory.

==== Armenian and Azerbaijani aircraft equipment ====
Below is a table listing the number of aircraft that were used by Armenia and Azerbaijan during the war.

Aircraft	Armenian	Armenian losses	Azerbaijani	Azerbaijani losses	Notes
Fighter aircraft
MiG-21	1	1	18	8	1 Azerbaijani MiG-21 was shot down near Shokhiy on 20 August 1992; 1 Azerbaijani MiG-21 shot down near Shokhiy on 31 August 1992 using small-arms fire; 1 or 2 Azerbaijani MiG-21s shot down over Argadzar on 30 October 1992; 1 Azerbaijani MiG-21 shot down in January 1993; 1 Armenian MiG-21 shot down on 15 January 1993; 1 Azerbaijani MiG-21 shot down between Agdam and Martuni on 22 July 1993; 1 Azerbaijani MiG-21 shot down over Verdenisskiy on 17 February 1994 using SA-14
MiG-23	–	–	?	1	
MiG-25	–	–	20	~10	20 MiG-25RBs were taken over from Russian base: 1 Azerbaijani MiG-25 flown by Yuri Belichenko was shot down near Cherban on 20 August 1992 using SA-7A; 1 Azerbaijani MiG-25 shot down over Srkharend on 30 October 1992; 1 Azerbaijani MiG-25 shot down over Shushimsky on 11 November 1992; 1 (or 3) Azerbaijani MiG-25s reported as shot down in late 1992; 2 Azerbaijani MiG-25s shot down on 1 January 1993; 1 Azerbaijani MiG-25 shot down near Srkhavend and Gazanchi on 15 January 1993 by Petros Ghevondyan using Igla; 1 Azerbaijani MiG-25 shot down in January 1993 (?); 4 Azerbaijani MiG-25s shot down on 22 July 1993 (?); By the end of the war AzAF was down to 10 MiG-25s
Ground attack aircraft
Su-17M and Su-22	–	–	4	1	1 Azerbaijani Su-22 was shot down on 19 February 1994 over Verdenisskiy using SA-14
Su-24	–	–	19–20	?	initially Azerbaijani had 3–4 Su-24s, then an additional 16 Su-24MRs were taken over from Russian base
Su-25	2	0	7	2	1 Azerbaijani Su-25 flown by Kurbanov was shot down over Mkhrdag on 13 June 1992 using MANPAD; 1 Azerbaijani Su-25 shot down near Malibeili on 10 October 1992 using MANPAD; Armenians had 3 additional Su-25s, but they were inactive and never used in combat.
Trainer aircraft
Aero L-29	1	–	18	14	
Aero L-39	1–2 (?)	?	12	?	Azerbaijanis lost at least 1 L-39 on 24 June 1992 near Lachin
Attack helicopters
Mi-24	12 – 15	2 or 4	25–30	19–24	By the end of the war AzAF had only six Mi-24s left.
Transport and utility helicopters
Mi-2	2	?	7	?	
Mi-8 and Mi-17	7	6	13–14	4	
Transport aircraft
Il-76	–	–	3	0	
An-12	–	–	1	0	
An-24	–	–	1	0	
Tu-134	1	0	1	0	

=== 1993–1994, exhaustion and peace ===
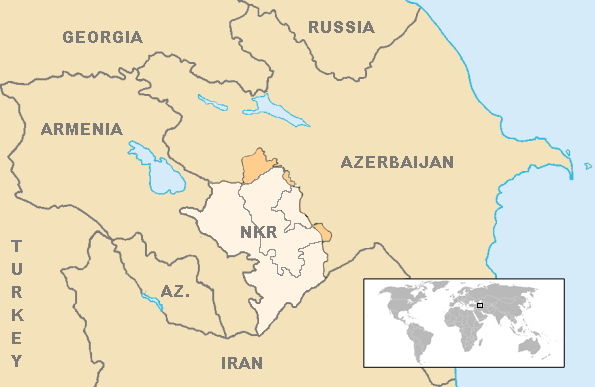
The final borders of the conflict after the 1994 ceasefire was signed. Armenian forces of Nagorno-Karabakh occupied 16% of Azerbaijan's territory, while Azerbaijani forces control Shahumian and the eastern parts of Martakert and Martuni.

In October 1993, Aliyev was formally elected president of Azerbaijan and promised to bring social order to the country in addition to recapturing the lost regions. In October, Azerbaijan joined the CIS. The winter season was marked with similar conditions as in the previous year, both sides scavenging for wood and harvesting foodstuffs months in advance. Two subsequent UNSC resolutions on the Nagorno-Karabakh conflict were passed, 874 and 884, in October and November. Reemphasizing the same points as the previous two, they acknowledged Nagorno-Karabakh as a region of Azerbaijan.

In early January 1994, Azerbaijani forces and Afghan guerrillas recaptured part of the Fuzuli district, including the railway junction of Horadiz on the Iranian border, but failed to recapture the town of Fuzuli itself. On 10 January an offensive was launched by Azerbaijan toward the region of Mardakert in an attempt to recapture the northern section of the enclave. The offensive managed to advance and take back several parts of Karabakh in the north and to the south but soon petered out. In response, Armenia began sending conscripts and regular Army and Interior Ministry troops to stop the Azerbaijani advance in Karabakh. To bolster the ranks of its army, the Armenian government issued a decree that instituted a three-month call-up for men up to age 45 and resorted to press-gang raids to enlist recruits. Several active-duty Armenian Army soldiers were captured by the Azerbaijani forces.

Azerbaijan's offensives grew more desperate as boys as young as 16, with little to no training, were recruited and sent to take part in ineffective human wave attacks (a tactic often compared to the one employed by Iran during the Iran–Iraq War). The two offensives that took place in the winter cost Azerbaijan as many as 5,000 lives (at the loss of several hundred Armenians). The main Azerbaijani offensive was aimed at recapturing the Kalbajar district, which would thus threaten the Lachin corridor. The attack initially met little resistance and was successful in capturing the vital Omar Pass. As the Armenian forces reacted, the bloodiest clashes of the war ensued and the Azerbaijani forces were soundly defeated. In a single clash, Azerbaijan lost about 1,500 of its soldiers after the failed offensive in Kalbajar.

While the political leadership changed hands several times in Azerbaijan, most Armenian soldiers in Karabakh claimed that the Azerbaijani youth and Azerbaijanis themselves, were demoralized and lacked a sense of purpose and commitment to fighting the war. (Note: As one Armenian fighter commented: "The difference is in what you do and what you do it for. You know a few miles back is your family, children, women and old people and therefore you're duty-bound to fight to the death so that those behind you will live.") Russian professor Georgiy I. Mirsky supported this contention in his 1997 book On Ruins of Empire, writing that "Karabakh does not matter to Azerbaijanis as much as it does to Armenians. Probably, this is why young volunteers from Armenia proper have been much more eager to fight and die for Karabakh than the Azerbaijanis have." A New York Times correspondent who visited the region in 1994 noted that, "In Stepanakert, it is impossible to find an able-bodied man – whether volunteer from Armenia or local resident – out of uniform. [Whereas in] Azerbaijan, draft-age men hang out in cafes." At the outset of the conflict, Andrei Sakharov famously remarked: "For Azerbaijan, the issue of Karabakh is a matter of ambition, for the Armenians of Karabakh, it is a matter of life or death."

=== 1994 ceasefire ===
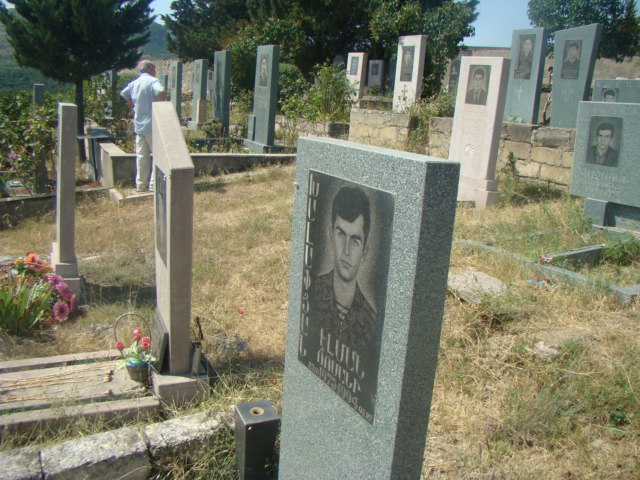
The graves of Armenian soldiers in Stepanakert

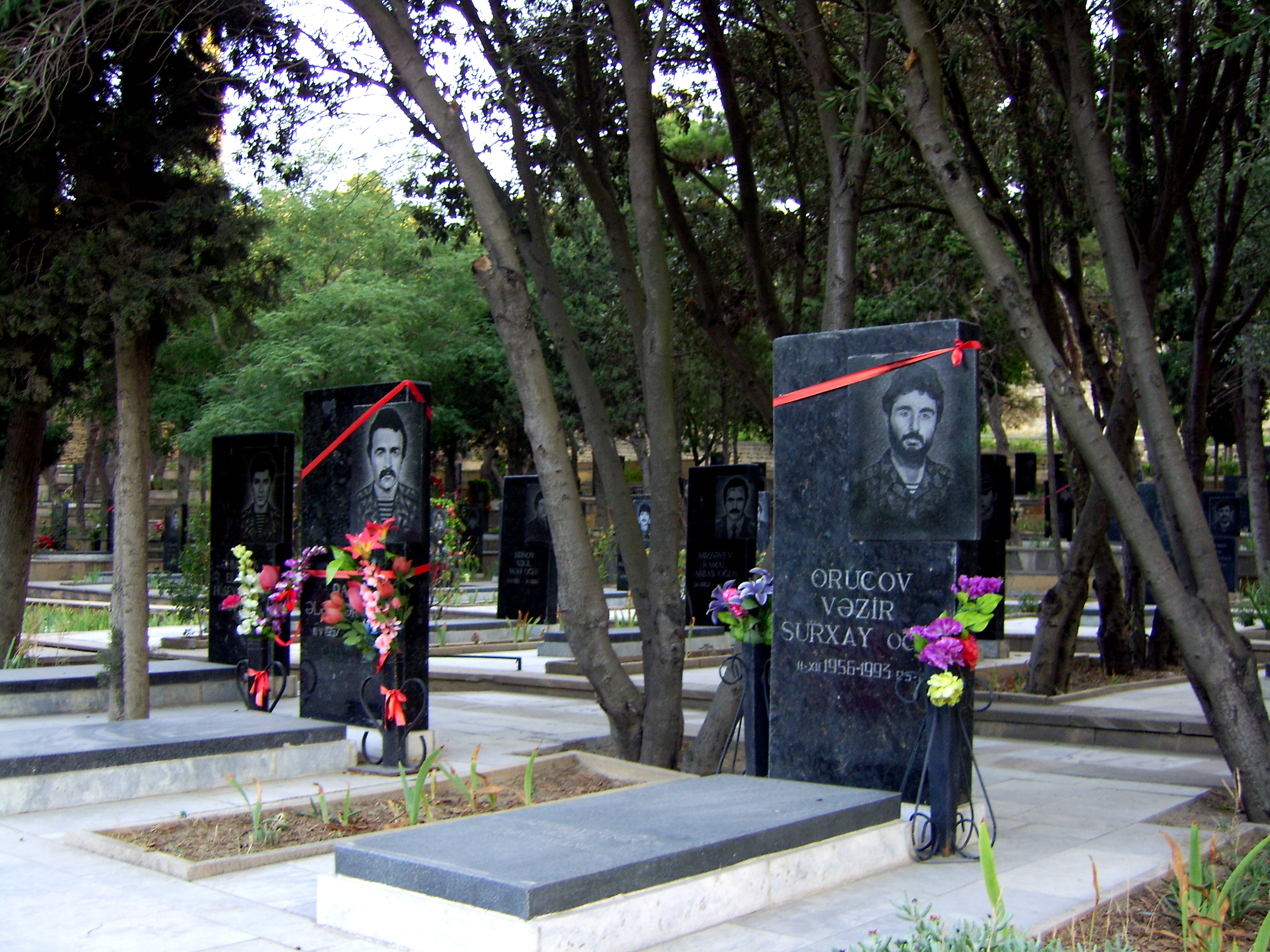
The graves of Azerbaijani soldiers in Baku

After six years of intense fighting, both sides were ready for a ceasefire. Azerbaijan, with its manpower exhausted and aware that Armenian forces had an unimpeded path to march on to Baku, counted on a new ceasefire proposal from either the OSCE or Russia. As the final battles of the conflict took place near Shahumyan, in a series of brief engagements in Gulustan, Armenian and Azerbaijani diplomats met in the early part of 1994 to hammer out the details of the ceasefire. On 5 May, with Russia acting as a mediator, all parties agreed to cease hostilities and vowed to observe a ceasefire that would go into effect at 12:01 AM on 12 May. The agreement was signed by the respective defence ministers of the three principal warring parties (Armenia, Azerbaijan and the Republic of Artsakh). In Azerbaijan, many welcomed the end of hostilities. Sporadic fighting continued in some parts of the region but all sides vowed to abide by the terms of the ceasefire.

== Media coverage ==
Coverage of the war was provided by a number of journalists from both sides, including Vardan Hovhannisyan, who won the 2007 Tribeca Film Festival's prize for a best new documentary filmmaker for his A Story of People in War and Peace, and Chingiz Mustafayev, who was posthumously awarded the title of National Hero of Azerbaijan. Armenian-Russian journalist Dmitri Pisarenko who spent a year at the front line and filmed many of the battles later wrote that both Armenian and Azerbaijani journalists were preoccupied with echoing the official stands of their respective governments and that "objectiveness was being sacrificed for ideology." Armenian military commanders were eager to give interviews following Azerbaijani offensives when they were able to criticise the other side for launching heavy artillery attacks that the "small-numbered but proud Armenians" had to fight off. Yet they were reluctant to speak out when Armenian troops seized a village outside Nagorno-Karabakh in order to avoid justifying such acts. Therefore, Armenian journalists felt the need to be creative enough to portray the event as "an Armenian counter-offensive" or as "a necessary military operation".

Bulgarian journalist Tsvetana Paskaleva is noted for her coverage of Operation Ring. Some foreign journalists previously concerned with emphasizing the Soviets conceding in the Cold War, gradually shifted toward presenting the USSR as a country awash in ethnic conflict, the Nagorno-Karabakh conflict being one of them.

Due to lack of available information about the roots and causes of the conflict, foreign reporters filled the information vacuum with constant references to the religious factor, i.e. the fact that Armenians were predominantly Christian, whereas Azeris were predominantly Muslim; a factor which in fact was virtually irrelevant in the course of the entire conflict. Readers already aware of rising military Islamism in the Middle East were considered a perfect audience to be informed of a case of "Muslim oppressors victimising a Christian minority". Religion was unduly stressed more than political, territorial and ethnic factors, with very rare references to democratic and self-determination movements in both countries. It was not until the Khojaly Massacre in late February 1992, when hundreds of civilian Azeris were massacred by Armenian units, that references to religion largely disappeared, as being contrary to the neat journalistic scheme where "Christian Armenians" were shown as victims and "Muslim Azeris" as their victimisers. A study of the four largest Canadian newspapers covering the event showed that the journalists tended to present the massacre of Azeris as a secondary issue, as well as to rely on Armenian sources, to give priority to Armenian denials over Azerbaijani "allegations" (which were described as "grossly exaggerated"), to downplay the scale of death, not to publish images of the bodies and mourners, and not to mention the event in editorials and opinion columns.

Contrary to media reports that nearly always mentioned the religions of the Armenians and Azerbaijanis, religious aspects never gained significance as an additional casus belli, and the Karabakh conflict has remained primarily an issue of territory and the human rights of Armenians in Karabakh.

== Post-ceasefire violence and mediation ==
Since 1995, the co-chairs of the OSCE Minsk Group has been mediating with the governments of Armenia and Azerbaijan for a new solution. Numerous proposals have been made which have primarily been based on both sides making several concessions. One such proposal stipulated that as Armenian forces withdrew from the seven regions surrounding Karabakh, Azerbaijan would share some of its economic assets including profits from an oil pipeline that would go from Baku through Armenia to Turkey. Other proposals also included that Azerbaijan would provide the broadest form of autonomy to Karabakh next to granting it full independence. Armenia has also been pressured by being excluded from major economic projects throughout the region, including the Baku-Tbilisi-Ceyhan pipeline and Kars-Tbilisi-Baku railway.

According to Armenia's former president, Levon Ter-Petrosyan, by giving certain Karabakh territories to Azerbaijan, the Karabakh conflict would have been resolved in 1997. A peace agreement could have been concluded and a status for Nagorno-Karabakh would have been determined. Ter-Petrosyan noted years later that the Karabakh leadership approach was maximalist and "they thought they could get more." Most autonomy proposals have been rejected by the Armenians, who consider it as a matter that is not negotiable. Likewise, Azerbaijan warns the country is ready to free its territories by war, but still prefers to solve the problem by peaceful means. On 30 March 1998, Robert Kocharyan was elected president and continued to reject calls for making a deal to resolve the conflict. In 2001, Kocharyan and Aliyev met in Key West, Florida for peace talks sponsored by the OSCE. While several Western diplomats expressed optimism, failure to prepare the populations of either country for compromise reportedly thwarted hopes for a peaceful resolution.

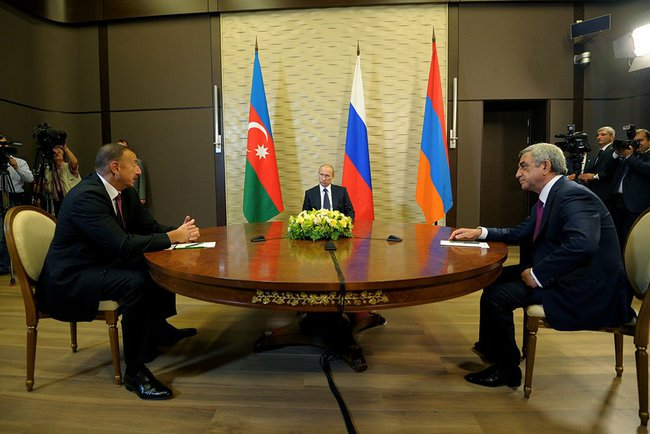
Ilham Aliyev, Serzh Sargsyan and Vladimir Putin, 10 August 2014

An estimated 400,000 Armenians living in Azerbaijan fled to Armenia or Russia and a further 30,000 came from Karabakh. Many of those who left Karabakh returned after the war ended. An estimated 655,000 Azerbaijanis were displaced from the fighting including those from both Armenia and Karabakh. Various other ethnic groups living in Karabakh were also forced to live in refugee camps built by both the Azerbaijani and Iranian governments. (Note: For more detailed statistics on the status of refugees and the number of internally displaced persons see human rights in Nagorno-Karabakh) While Azerbaijan has repeatedly claimed that 20% of its territory has fallen under Armenian control, other sources have given figures as high 40% (the number comes down to 9% if Nagorno-Karabakh itself is excluded).

The First Nagorno-Karabakh War has given rise to strong anti-Armenian sentiment in Azerbaijan and anti-Azerbaijani sentiment in Armenia. The ramifications of the war were said to have played a part in the February 2004 murder of Armenian Lieutenant Gurgen Markaryan who was hacked to death with an axe by his Azerbaijani counterpart, Ramil Safarov at a NATO training seminar in Budapest, Hungary.

Presumably trying to erase any traces of Armenian heritage, the Azerbaijani government ordered its military the destruction of thousands of unique medieval Armenian gravestones, known as khachkars, at a massive historical cemetery in Julfa, Nakhichevan. This destruction was temporarily halted when first revealed in 1998, but then continued on to completion in 2005.

== Current situation ==
In the years since the end of the war, a number of organizations have passed resolutions regarding the conflict. On 25 January 2005, for example, Parliamentary Assembly of the Council of Europe (PACE) adopted a controversial non-binding resolution, Resolution 1416, which criticized the "large-scale ethnic expulsion and the creation of mono-ethnic areas" and declared that Armenian forces were occupying Azerbaijan lands. The Assembly recalled that the occupation of a foreign country by a Member State was a serious violation of the obligations undertaken by that State as a member of the Council of Europe and once again reaffirmed the right of displaced persons to return to their homes safely. On 14 May 2008 thirty-nine countries from the United Nations General Assembly adopted Resolution 62/243 which called for "the immediate, complete and unconditional withdrawal of all Armenian forces from all occupied territories of the Republic of Azerbaijan". Almost one hundred countries abstained from voting while seven countries, including the three co-chairs of the Minsk Group, Russia, the United States and France, voted against it.

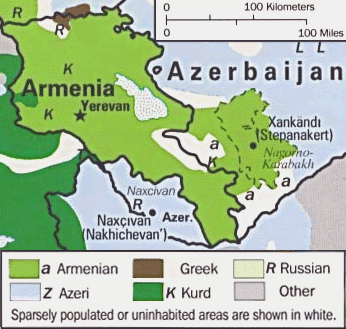
Ethnic groups of the region in 1995. (See entire map)

During the summit of the Organisation of the Islamic Conference (OIC) and the session of its Council of Ministers of Foreign Affairs, member states adopted OIC Resolution No. 10/11 and OIC Council of Foreign Ministers Resolution No. 10/37, on 14 March 2008 and 18–20 May 2010, respectively. Both resolutions condemned alleged aggression of Armenia against Azerbaijan and called for immediate implementation of UN Security Council Resolutions 822, 853, 874 and 884. As a response, Armenian leaders have stated Azerbaijan was "exploiting Islam to muster greater international support".

In 2008, the Moscow Defense Brief opined that because of the rapid growth of Azerbaijani defence expenditures – which is driving the strong rearmament of the Azerbaijani armed forces – the military balance appeared to be now shifting in Azerbaijan's favour: "The overall trend is clearly in Azerbaijan's favour, and it seems that Armenia will not be able to sustain an arms race with Azerbaijan's oil-fueled economy. And this could lead to the destabilization of the frozen conflict between these two states", the journal wrote. Other analysts have made more cautious observations, noting that administrative and military deficiencies are obviously found in the Azerbaijani military and that the Nagorno-Karabakh Defense Army maintains a "constant state of readiness".

=== Clashes ===
In early 2008, tensions between Armenia, the NKR Karabakh and Azerbaijan grew. On the diplomatic front, President Ilham Aliyev repeated statements that Azerbaijan would resort to force, if necessary, to take the territories back; concurrently, shooting incidents along the line of contact increased. On 5 March 2008 a significant breach of the ceasefire occurred in Mardakert when up to sixteen soldiers were killed. Both sides accused the other of starting the battle. Moreover, the use of artillery in the skirmishes marked a significant departure from previous clashes, which usually involved only sniper or machine-gun fire. Deadly skirmishes took place during mid-2010 as well.

Tensions escalated again in July–August 2014 with ceasefire breaches by Azerbaijan taking place and President Aliyev, threatening Armenia with war.

Rather than receding, the tension in the area increased in April 2016 with the 2016 Nagorno-Karabakh clashes when the worst clashes since the 1994 ceasefire erupted. The Armenian Defense Ministry alleged that Azerbaijan launched an offensive to seize territory in the region. Azerbaijan reported that 12 of its soldiers were killed in action and that an Mi-24 helicopter and tank were also destroyed. Armenian president Serzh Sargsyan stated that 18 Armenian soldiers were killed and 35 were wounded.

=== Second Nagorno-Karabakh War ===
Situation after the 2020 Nagorno Karabakh War Areas captured by Azerbaijan during the war. Areas returned to Azerbaijan per the ceasefire agreement. Areas in Nagorno-Karabakh where Russian peacekeepers operate. Lachin corridor and Dadivank monastery where Russian peacekeepers operate.

The second war began on the morning of 27 September 2020 along the Nagorno-Karabakh Line of Contact. In response to initial clashes, Armenia and Artsakh introduced martial law and total mobilization; Azerbaijan also introduced martial law and a curfew, and declared partial mobilization the day after. Engagements were characterised by the use of heavy artillery, armoured warfare, rocket attacks, and drone warfare, as well as by emerging accounts of the use of cluster munitions, banned by most of the international community, but not by Armenia or Azerbaijan.

The second war ended with the victory of Azerbaijan, which took control of 4 Armenian-occupied districts, as well as towns of Shusha and Hadrut in Nagorno-Karabakh proper, and signing of a Russian-brokered ceasefire agreement, under which Armenia agreed to withdraw from another 3 occupied districts. The agreement also provided for deployment of Russian peacekeeping forces along the line of contact and the Lachin corridor.

== War crimes ==
Emerging from the collapse of the Soviet Union as nascent states and due to the near-immediate fighting, it was not until mid-1993 that Armenia and Azerbaijan became signatories of international law agreements, including the Geneva Conventions. Allegations from all three governments (including Nagorno-Karabakh's) regularly accused the other side of committing atrocities which were at times confirmed by third party media sources or human rights organizations. Khojaly Massacre, for example, was confirmed by both Human Rights Watch and Memorial. The Maraga Massacre was testified to by British-based organization Christian Solidarity International and by the Vice-Speaker of the British Parliament's House of Lords, Caroline Cox, in 1992. Azerbaijan was condemned by HRW for its use of aerial bombing in densely populated civilian areas and both sides were criticized for indiscriminate fire, hostage-taking, and the forcible displacement of civilians. The pogrom of Armenians in Baku was one of the acts of ethnic violence in the context of the Nagorno-Karabakh conflict.

As neither side was party to international military conventions, instances of ill-discipline and atrocity were rife. Looting and mutilation of body parts (brought back as war trophies) of dead soldiers were common. Another activity that was by regular civilians and not just soldiers during the war was the bartering of prisoners between Armenians and Azerbaijanis. Often, when contact was lost between family members and a soldier or a militiaman serving at the front, they took it upon themselves to organize an exchange by personally capturing a soldier from the battle lines and holding them in the confines of their own homes. New York Times journalist Yo'av Karny noted this practice was as "old as the people occupying [the] land".

After the war ended, both sides accused their opponents of continuing to hold captives; Azerbaijan claimed Armenia was continuing to hold nearly 5,000 Azerbaijani prisoners while Armenians claimed Azerbaijan was holding 600 prisoners. The non-profit group, Helsinki Initiative 92, investigated two prisons in Shusha and Stepanakert after the war ended, but concluded there were no prisoners-of-war there. A similar investigation arrived at the same conclusion while searching for Armenians allegedly labouring in Azerbaijan's quarries.

== Cultural legacy ==
The 1992–94 war figures heavily in popular Armenian and Azerbaijani media. It is a subject of many films and popular television shows. In June 2006, the film Destiny (Chakatagir) premiered in Yerevan and Stepanakert. The film, written and starring Gor Vardanyan, is a fictional account of the events revolving around Operation Ring. It cost $3.8 million to make, the most expensive film ever made in the country, and was touted as the first film made about the First Nagorno-Karabakh War. In mid-2012, Azerbaijanis in Azerbaijan released a video game entitled İşğal Altında: Şuşa (Under Occupation: Shusha), a free first-person shooter that allows the player to assume the role of an Azerbaijani soldier who takes part in the 1992 battle of Shusha. Commentators have noted that the game "is not for the faint of heart: there's lots of killing and computer-generated gore. To a great extent, it's a celebration of violence: to advance, players must handle a variety of tasks, including shooting lots of Armenian enemies, rescuing a wounded Azerbaijani soldier, retrieving a document, and blowing up a building in the town of Shusha." Another opus followed, İşğal Altında: Ağdam, which was released in 2013. This episode is very similar to the previous one, but this time it takes place in Agdam. In April 2018, a documentary film about an Azerbaijani Nagorno-Karabakh War participant Imran Gurbanov, called Return was premiered in Baku. It was directed by Rufat Asadov and written by Orkhan Fikratoglu.
