= 2008 Mardakert clashes =

Fighting in the Nagorno-Karabakh conflict

- Part of Nagorno-Karabakh conflict
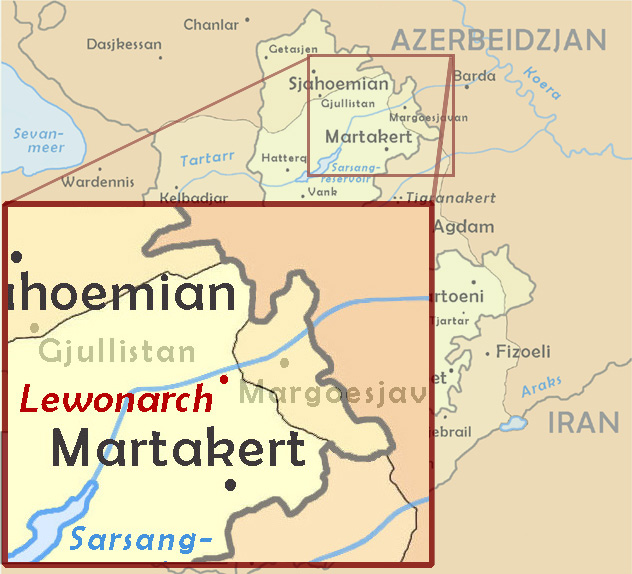
- NKR, Mardakert, and the line of contact
Date	4 March 2008
Location	Mardakert/Aghdara, Nagorno-Karabakh Republic
Result	Both sides claim victory: Azerbaijan removes its troops

Belligerents
Artsakh	Azerbaijan

Commanders and leaders
Movses Hakobyan	Najmaddin Sadigov

Strength
Unknown	Unknown, armored vehicles

Casualties and losses
Per Armenia: 2 wounded Per Azerbaijan: 12 killed, 15 wounded	Per Azerbaijan: 4 killed, 1 wounded Per Armenia: 8 killed, 7 wounded
- 2 Azerbaijani civilians wounded

The 2008 Mardakert clashes began on March 4 after the 2008 Armenian election protests. It involved the heaviest fighting between ethnic Armenian and Azerbaijani forces over the disputed region of Nagorno-Karabakh since the 1994 ceasefire after the First Nagorno-Karabakh War.

Armenian sources accused Azerbaijan of trying to take advantage of ongoing unrest in Armenia. Azerbaijani sources blamed Armenia, claiming that the Armenian government was trying to divert attention from internal tensions in Armenia.

Following the incident, on March 14 the United Nations General Assembly by a recorded vote of 39 in favour to 7 against adopted Resolution 62/243, demanding the immediate withdrawal of all Armenian forces.

== Background ==
=== First Nagorno-Karabakh War ===
During and shortly after the dissolution of the Soviet Union, Armenians in the Nagorno-Karabakh Autonomous Oblast and Azeris were involved in the First Nagorno-Karabakh War from February 1988 to May 1994. As the war progressed, the former Soviet republics of Armenia and Azerbaijan became enveloped in a protracted, undeclared war as Azerbaijan attempted to curb the secessionist movement in Nagorno-Karabakh. The enclave's parliament voted on February 20, 1988, to unify with Armenia, and the vast majority of the Karabakh population voted in favor of independence in a referendum. The demand to unify with Armenia, which proliferated in the late 1980s, began in a relatively peaceful manner; however, in the following months, as the Soviet Union's disintegration neared, it gradually grew into an increasingly violent conflict between the two ethnic groups, resulting in claims of ethnic cleansing by all sides.

The war was the most destructive ethnic conflict in both terms of lives and property that emerged after the Soviet Union collapsed in December 1991. The declaration of independence was the final result of a "long-standing resentment in the Armenian community of Nagorno Karabakh against serious limitations of its cultural and religious freedom by central Soviet and Azerbaijani authorities," but more importantly, as a territorial conflict regarding the land.

As Azerbaijan declared its independence from the Soviet Union and removed the powers held by the enclave's government, the Armenian majority voted to secede from Azerbaijan, and in the process proclaimed the Republic of Nagorno-Karabakh.

Full-scale fighting erupted in the late winter of 1992. International mediation by several groups including the Organization for Security and Co-operation in Europe (OSCE) failed to bring an end resolution that both sides could work with. In the spring of 1993, Armenian forces captured regions outside the enclave itself, threatening the involvement of other countries in the region. By the cease fire in 1994, the Armenians were in full control of not only the enclave but also approximately 9% of Azerbaijan's territory outside the enclave, which they still control. As many as 230,000 Armenians from Azerbaijan and 800,000 Azeris from Armenia and Karabakh have been displaced as a result of the conflict. A Russian-brokered cease fire was signed in May 1994 and peace talks, mediated by the OSCE Minsk Group, have been held ever since by Armenia and Azerbaijan. The ceasefire is self-monitored by the armed forces of the now de facto independent Republic of Nagorno-Karabakh and by Azerbaijan. Violations of the cease fire in the form of sporadic shooting incidents have occurred, but the cease fire has largely held.

=== 2008 Armenian presidential election protests ===
Following the Armenian Presidential Election of 2008, there were a series of mass protests in Yerevan, Armenia alleging electoral fraud. Initially these protests were peaceful though unauthorized by government. They began on February 20 and lasted for 10-days. Despite the urging of the government to stop the unauthorized demonstrations, the protests continued until March 1. On the morning of March 1, police and army troops dispersed the 700–1,000 persons who remained overnight. At noon on March 1, over ten thousand demonstrators held a protest at the French embassy in Yerevan and over the evening, clashes broke out between protestors and law enforcement. A 20-day state of emergency, including a censure on free press, was declared by the incumbent President Robert Kocharyan. On March 2, the Armenian Army with armoured personnel carriers.

Up to 9 people died in clashes between police and protesters: one police officer and eight civilians. Sixteen officers were hospitalized with bullet wounds. On March 4, 2008, the OSCE issued a press release citing the ban on independent news coverage and censorship temporarily imposed by Armenian authorities as contrary to OSCE commitments.

In this context, the Armenian side blames Azerbaijan for trying to take advantage of unrest in Armenia. The Azeri side blames Armenia claiming that they are trying to divert attention from problems at home however Azerbaijan's President Ilham Aliyev has also said his country is ready to re-take the region by force, and has been buying the military hardware and ammunition to do so.

== Prelude ==
In a sign of disapproval after the 2008 Kosovo declaration of independence, Azerbaijan's parliament voted to withdraw a 33-strong Azeri peacekeeping team that has been serving there under NATO command since 1999, as a part of Turkish peacekeeping mission. Speaking on March 4, Azerbaijan's president Ilham Aliyev said that Kosovo's independence is "emboldening Armenian separatists in Nagorno-Karabakh", and that his country was ready to take it back by force. Prior to the skirmishes, Ilham Aliyev had insisted on numerous occasions that his country was ready to re-take the region by force, and had been buying the military hardware and ammunition to do so. Aliyev nevertheless expressed hope that Azerbaijan's growing military could nudge talks towards a diplomatic breakthrough: "A time will come when the Armenians will agree to that (settlement)," he said.

== Active stage ==
=== Armenian version of events ===
According to the Armenian side, Azerbaijani forces attacked Armenian positions near the village of Levonarkh in the Mardakert Region of north-eastern Nagorno-Karabakh early March 4, 2008. They then briefly seized positions held by Armenian forces, which were later recaptured. The Armenian side also claimed that eight Azeri servicemen were killed and seven wounded, with two Armenian servicemen wounded, and that the Azeris fled leaving armament on the battlefield. Armenian president Robert Kocharyan also claimed that Azeri troops used heavy artillery in the fighting.

=== Azerbaijani version of events ===
According to the Azerbaijani side, Armenian forces attacked the positions of Azerbaijani army in the Tartar district of Azerbaijan. In the resulting battle, eight Azeri servicemen and twelve Armenian servicemen were killed, and four Armenian servicemen were wounded.

== Aftermath ==
Azerbaijani side announced the names of four killed servicemen

- Nemat Habibulla oglu Tusayev, born in 1988, recruited by Zagatala region enlistment office in 2007
- Yusif Oruj oglu Gasimov, born in 1988, recruited by Sheki region enlistment office in 2007
- Bahruz Arzu oglu Ismayilov, born in 1988, recruited by Sheki enlistment office in 2006
- Jeyhun Bahaddin oglu Safarov, born in 1978, recruited by Khatai enlistment office in 1996RE

On March 7, 2008, Nagorno-Karabakh's De facto news agency reports a concentration Azerbaijani troops at the contact line where the prior ceasefire violation occurred. On March 8–9 another exchange of gunfire occurred at the contact line near Aghdam. Azerbaijani Defense Ministry spokesman Eldar Sabiroglu said two Azerbaijani civilians were killed and two wounded in the shooting overnight on March 8, in the Aghdam region. Sabiroglu claimed that additional small arms gunfire between Armenian and Azeri troops occurred on March 9, killing one Azerbaijani soldier and injuring another. He also claimed that an Armenian soldier was also killed which Nagorno-Karabakh's defense minister, Lt. Col. Senor Asratian, denied.

=== Dispute over casualties ===
The Armenian head of national military investigation institute of the Defense Ministry rejected the Azerbaijani claim about twelve Armenian deaths. Meanwhile, the press service of the Azerbaijani Ministry of Defense insisted that the claim by Armenian president about eight casualties on Azeri side was false because it would be impossible to hide the deaths of four more servicemen in the presence of the media and the public in Azerbaijan. Azerbaijan insisted that four Azeri soldiers and twelve Armenian soldiers were killed and fifteen Armenian soldiers wounded, while Armenia insists that eight Azeri soldiers were killed and seven wounded, and that two Armenian soldiers were wounded, with no Armenian fatalities.

== International reaction ==
- Finland – Finnish foreign minister and OSCE Chairman-in-Office, Ilkka Kanerva, urged everyone concerned to “exercise maximum restraint, and observe the terms of the ceasefire".
- United States – State Department spokesman Tom Casey told reporters that the US was concerned about the incident, which only served to underline the need for a negotiated settlement.
- Russia – A statement released by the Russian Foreign Ministry said that Russia is seriously concerned about the military clashes in the northwest Nagorno-Karabakh region in Azerbaijan. It said the clashes would by no means be allowed to escalate into large-scale combat and spill over into neighboring regions.
- OSCE Minsk Group – French, Russian and U.S. co-chairs said the conflicting parties should "restore confidence along the Line of Contact and desist from any further confrontations, escalation of violence or warmongering rhetoric." They also called on Baku and Yerevan to "redouble their efforts to endorse the Basic Principles for the peaceful resolution of the conflict presented to the sides on the margins of the Madrid OSCE Ministerial in November 2007, and to begin as soon as possible the process of drafting a peace agreement on this basis."
