= OIC Council of Foreign Ministers Resolution 10/37 =

Organisation of Islamic Cooperation

Organisation of the Islamic Conference of Foreign Ministers Resolution 10/37, titled "The aggression of the Republic of Armenia against the Republic of Azerbaijan", is a set of three Organisation of the Islamic Conference (now Organisation of Islamic Cooperation) resolutions on Nagorno-Karabakh conflict adopted at the 37th annual session of Foreign Ministers of OIC member states on May 18–20, 2010 held in Dushanbe, Tajikistan. The session was attended by 80 delegations from member states, observer states and international organizations.

== The resolutions ==
The document consists of three resolutions on Nagorno-Karabakh conflict. The first resolution is on political issues and acknowledges Armenia as an aggressor, the second one discusses financial and economic assistance to the victims of the aggression and third resolution condemns destruction of historical Islamic monuments on the territory of Azerbaijan.

=== Resolution 10/37-POL ===
The political resolution 10/37-POL reaffirms the position of the OIC members states stated in the Resolution 10/11 adopted at OIC summit in Dakar, Senegal on March 13–14, 2008 expression concern over "aggression by the Republic of Armenia against the Republic of Azerbaijan", "the actions perpetrated against civilian Azerbaijani population in the occupied Azerbaijani territories" categorizing them "as crimes against humanity", condemns "illegal transfer of settlers of the Armenian nationality to those territories", welcomes the efforts of Kazakhstan in its capacity of the OSCE Chairman-in-Office to intensify the OSCE peace process and calls Armenia to comply with the UN Security Council Resolutions 822, 853, 874 and 884, and the international community "to use such effective political and economic measures as required in order to put an end to Armenian aggression and occupation of the Azerbaijani territories".

=== Resolution 6/37-E ===
Under the section of Economic Assistance to the Republic of Azerbaijan of Resolution 6/37-E for Economic Assistance to Member States and Muslim Communities in Non-OIC Countries, the Council of Ministers of Foreign Affairs of members states confirmed their support to the government and people of Azerbaijan in a difficult time in the country's history, deplored "Armenia-backed aggressive separatism instigated in the Nagorno-Karabakh region of the Republic of Azerbaijan followed by aggression and occupation by Armenia of about 20 percent of Azerbaijani territories and resulted in violent displacement of almost one million Azerbaijani people from their homes, which, as such, resembles the terrible concept of ethnic cleansing" and due to the economic damage inflicted on Azerbaijan and its territories exceeding $60 billion, welcomed assistance extended by some of the OIC member states UN institutions and international organizations. The resolution underlined that despite the fact that Azerbaijani government was able to solve problems of refugees and IDPs, there is still a need for technical and financial assistance by donor countries for implementation of development projects targeting improvement of living conditions of IDPs.

=== Resolution 2/37-C ===
Under the section The Destruction and Desecration of Islamic Historical and Cultural Relics and Shrines in the Occupied Azerbaijan Territories of Resolution No. 2/37-C On Protection of Islamic Holy Places, the Council of Ministers of Foreign Affairs of members states expressed concern over "pieces of Azerbaijani history, culture, archaeology, and ethnography remaining in the territories occupied by Armenia" which are an integral part of Islamic heritage, reaffirmed that "the utter and barbaric destruction of mosques and other Islamic Shrines in Azerbaijan, at the hands of Armenia, for the purpose of ethnic cleansing is a crime against humanity" noted the enormous damages caused by Armenian aggression on the Islamic heritage in the Azerbaijani territories occupied by the Republic of Armenia, "including total or partial demolition of rare antiquities and places of Islamic civilization, history, and architecture, such as mosques, mausoleums, graves, archaeological excavations, museums, libraries, art exhibition halls, and government theatres and conservatories, besides the destruction and smuggling out of the country of large quantities of priceless treasures and millions of books and historic manuscripts", recognized these acts as an attempt to totally annihilate Islamic heritage in the occupied Azerbaijani territories and asserted Azerbaijan's entitlement to "adequate compensation for the damages it has sustained" and affirmed the Republic of Armenia's responsibility to pay up full compensation for such damages.

== See also ==
- Organization of Islamic Conference Resolution 10/11
- United Nations General Assembly Resolution 62/243
- NATO Lisbon Summit Declaration
- List of United Nations Security Council resolutions on the Nagorno-Karabakh conflict
