= Council of Europe Parliamentary Assembly Resolution 1416 (2005) =

Proposed resolution on the conflicts in Nagorno-Karabakh

Council of Europe Parliamentary Assembly (PACE) Resolution 1416 (2005), titled “The conflict over the Nagorno-Karabakh region dealt with by the OSCE Minsk Conference”, is a resolution of PACE about the situation on occupied territories currently in the possession of Azerbaijan by Armenian military forces, adopted by PACE on January 25, 2005.

== Text of resolution ==
In this resolution, the co-signers of PACE reiterate that “considerable parts of the territory of Azerbaijan are still occupied by Armenian forces, and separatist forces are still in control of the Nagorno-Karabakh region.” At the same time PACE underlined its concerns about “widespread ethnic hostilities which preceded it, led to large-scale ethnic expulsion and the creation of mono-ethnic areas which resemble the terrible concept of ethnic cleansing.“ By stating that “independence and secession of a regional territory from a state may only be achieved through a lawful and peaceful process based on the democratic support of the inhabitants of such territory and not in the wake of an armed conflict leading to ethnic expulsion and the de facto annexation of such territory to another state.”, PACE rejected claims that regional territories with minorities have an absolute right to secession.

PACE “recalls Resolutions 822 (1993), 853 (1993), 874 (1993) and 884 (1993) of the United Nations Security Council and urges the parties concerned to comply with them, in particular … by withdrawing military forces from any occupied territories”. This document is an important international document asserting participation of military forces of Armenia in occupation of Azerbaijani lands. The Resolution of PACE is a document adopted in sake of peaceful resolution of the Nagorno-Karabakh settlement. The Resolution calls upon parties to use only peaceful means for settling the conflict. The same concerns were put forward by European Parliament in its resolution dated 20 May 2010. As it was stated in the text of the Resolution, European Parliament “is seriously concerned that hundreds of thousands of refugees and IDPs who fled their homes during or in connection with the Nagorno-Karabakh war remain displaced and denied their rights, including the right to return, property rights and the right to personal security; … demands, in this regard, the withdrawal of Armenian forces from all occupied territories of Azerbaijan”.

== Draft resolution ==
The draft of the resolution was prepared by the Political Affairs Committee of PACE, where the most concern appeared as “displacing of hundreds of thousands of people” from their lands and occupation of the “considerable parts of the territory of Azerbaijan by Armenian forces”.

In an explanatory memorandum prepared by David Atkinson of the United Kingdom, European Democrat Group, it was asserted that the borders of Azerbaijan were internationally recognised at the time of the country being recognised as independent state in 1991 and this territory of Azerbaijan included the Nagorno-Karabakh region.

== Ad hoc Committee on Nagorno-Karabakh ==
In the resolution No. 1416, PACE instructed its Bureau to establish an ad hoc committee with the participation of, inter alia, the heads of delegations of the Minsk Group countries. Accordingly, the Sub-Committee on Nagorno-Karabakh was set up on 28 January 2005 and headed by the former chairman of PACE, British parliamentarian Lord Russell Johnston. The purpose of the committee was to increase efforts to achieve a peaceful solution to the conflict. However, shortly after — in 2008, due to Russell Johnston's death, the committee suspended its activity.

Reports prepared during Johnston's presidency pointed out that "nothing has been done to prepare the populations of the two countries for the possibility of a compromise. None of the communities seems ready to make concessions or to accept the measures currently being negotiated by the two foreign ministers."

The efforts to revive the committee began in early 2010. On January 28, 2011, the PACE Bureau agreed on reforming the subcommittee and unanimously elected the Spanish parliamentarian Jordi Xuclà Costa as the chairman. In April of that year, before formally launching committee activities, Costa stated that he intended to "establish cooperation with politicians, ambassadors and academic circles" in Armenia and Azerbaijan.

Costa specifically acknowledged that the Armenian delegation was suspicious of the committee’s activities, although not opposed to them. Chairman of the Armenian delegation David Harutyunyan expressed concern that the committee was displaying a clear bias by referring to representatives from the Nagorno-Karabakh Republic as "some representative of some community", emphasizing that Nagorno-Karabakh is an independent party, and also because PACE President Mevlut Cavusoglu was also a Turkish parliamentarian. In response, Cavusoglu claimed that the decision to restore the committee was made by PACE months before he was elected as the chairman, and that no Turk participated in this initiative.

Armenian officials also expressed their dissatisfaction with PACE's refusal to recognize the so-called Nagorno Karabakh Republic as an independent party during the negotiations, as well as in the activities of the committee.

The OSCE Minsk Group has not made any official statement regarding the resumption of the committee.

== See also ==
- United Nations General Assembly Resolution 62/243
- List of United Nations Security Council resolutions on the Nagorno-Karabakh conflict
