= OIC Resolution 10/11 =

Organisation of Islamic Cooperation

- Ratified: 13—14 march 2008
- Location: Dakar, Senegal
- Purpose: Expressing concern for the aggression of the Republic of Armenia on the Republic of Azerbaijan, providing comprehensive support for the territorial integrity of the Republic of Azerbaijan

Organisation of the Islamic Conference Resolution 10/11, titled "The aggression of the Republic of Armenia against the Republic of Azerbaijan", is an Organisation of the Islamic Conference (now Organisation of Islamic Cooperation) Resolution on Nagorno-Karabakh conflict adopted by its member states on March 13–14, 2008 during the OIC summit in Dakar, Senegal. The resolution, titled "Aggression by the Republic of Armenia against the Republic of Azerbaijan," aims to express concern over Armenia's aggression against Azerbaijan and to provide comprehensive support for the territorial integrity of the Republic of Azerbaijan. The Dakar conference is considered a "successful step" towards supporting Azerbaijan's just cause. It was during this session that the new Charter of the Islamic Cooperation Organization was adopted, and in the section on the purposes and objectives of this international organization, it was stipulated that the member states support the right of states under occupation to restore their territorial integrity.

The document is one of several resolutions by OIC on Nagorno-Karabakh conflict.

== Background ==
In the late 1980s, armed conflict broke out between Armenia and Azerbaijan, resulting in the displacement of nearly one million Azerbaijanis as refugees and internally displaced persons, as well as the occupation of Nagorno-Karabakh and its surrounding seven districts by Armenian armed forces. Finally, with the mediation of Russia, a ceasefire was achieved on the front lines in May 1994.

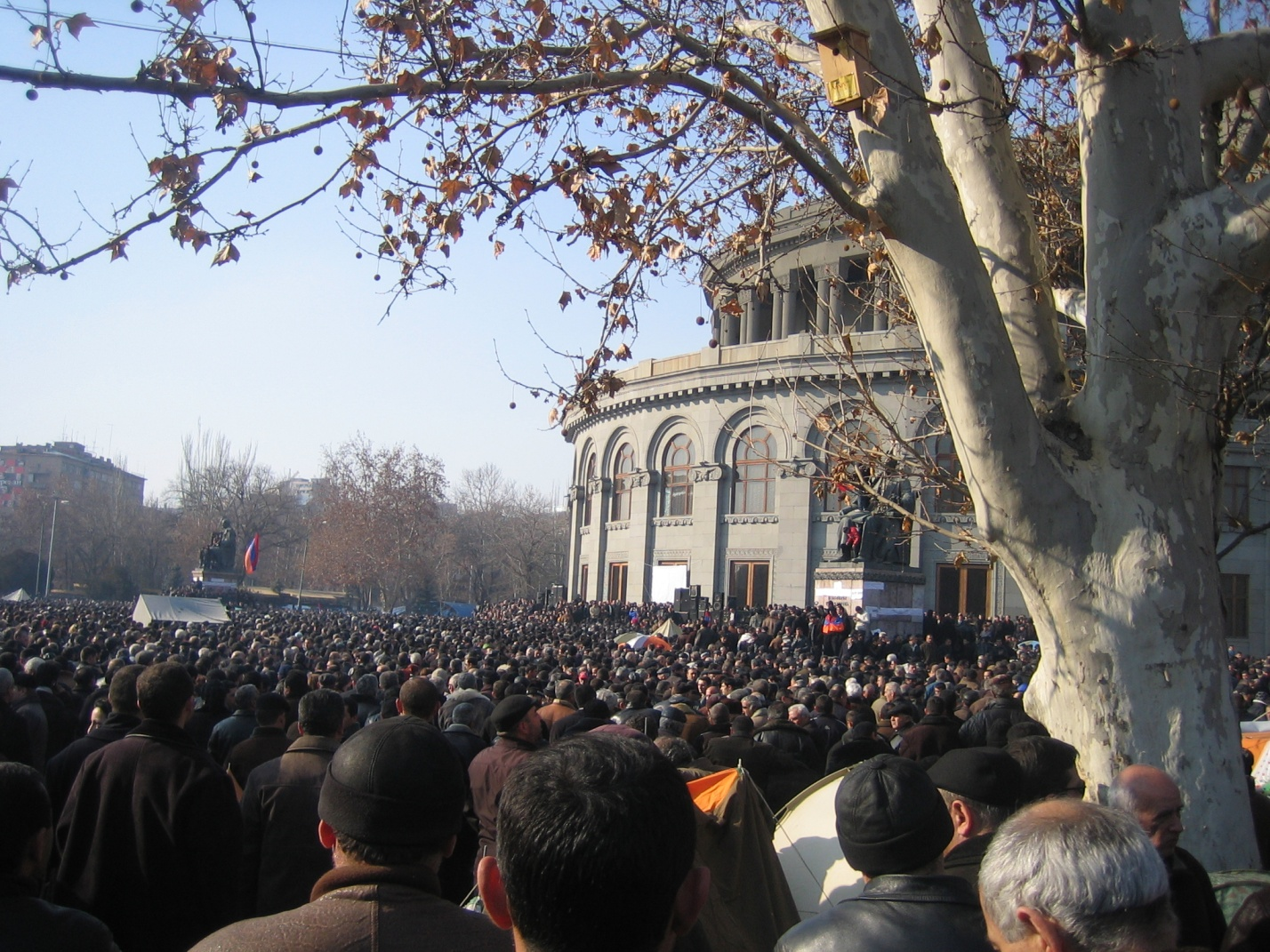
Armenians gathered on the Opera Square of Yerevan on the fourth day of the protests against the presidential elections. As a result of violent suppression of the movement, 10 people died , and more than 200 people were injured.

Despite the ceasefire agreement, the ceasefire regime was frequently violated in the subsequent years. The first significant clash between the parties occurred on March 4, 2008. According to a statement by the Ministry of Defense of the Republic of Azerbaijan, a reconnaissance-sabotage group of Armenians attempted to seize the frontline positions of the Azerbaijani army near the occupied village of Chilaburt in the Tartar region. As a result of the armed confrontation, four Azerbaijani servicemen were martyred. On the other side, it was reported that 12 soldiers were killed and 15 were injured. Subsequently, tension escalated again along the contact line in the direction of the Aghdam region on March 8-9. Eldar Sabiroglu, the head of the press service of the Ministry of Defense, reported that as a result of the Armenian military units opening fire on Azerbaijani villages, two Azerbaijani civilians were killed and two others were injured. Additionally, one Armenian soldier was killed in response fire. Ali Hasanov, a spokesperson for the Administration of the President of the Republic of Azerbaijan, referred to the situation on the front lines as Armenian provocations and linked it to the protests following the presidential elections held in Armenia in 2008. The protests, which were forcibly dispersed by the police, were organized by Levon Ter-Petrosyan, a presidential candidate and former president of the Republic of Armenia, and his supporters. According to Hasanov, "the Armenian leadership resort to such provocations to divert the attention of Armenians and the international community from the internal situation in the country." The Azerbaijani media noted that President Robert Kocharyan preferred to create artificial tension along the contact line to divert attention from internal processes and human rights violations.

== The text of the resolution ==
The resolution consists of 23 paragraphs. It expresses serious concern over the aggression of member states of the organization, particularly the Republic of Armenia, against the Republic of Azerbaijan, resulting in the occupation of approximately 20 percent of Azerbaijan's territory. Deep concern is expressed about the continued occupation of significant parts of Azerbaijani territory and the illegal transfer of Armenian nationals to these territories. The document also expresses profound sorrow over the dire situation of over a million Azerbaijani refugees and internally displaced persons as a result of Armenia's aggression, as well as the scale and severity of these humanitarian problems. The resolution reaffirms the obligation of all member states to respect the sovereignty, territorial integrity, and political independence of the Republic of Azerbaijan, as stipulated in Resolution 21/10-P(IS) adopted during the 10th session of the Islamic Summit Conference held in Putrajaya on October 16-17, 2003. The disruptive effect of Armenia's policy of occupation within the framework of the OSCE peace process is noted in the resolution.

According to the second paragraph of the resolution, the organization considers actions committed against the civilian Azerbaijani population in the occupied territories of Azerbaijan as crimes against humanity. In the third paragraph, the looting and destruction of archaeological, cultural, and religious monuments in Azerbaijan's occupied territories are strongly condemned. The organization demands the full and unconditional withdrawal of Armenian armed forces from all occupied Azerbaijani territories, including Nagorno-Karabakh, in accordance with UN Security Council resolutions 822, 853, 874, and 884, as well as the respect of Azerbaijan's sovereignty and territorial integrity by Armenia. Subsequently, the Organization of Islamic Cooperation expresses concern over Armenia's failure to comply with the demands reflected in the aforementioned resolutions of the UN Security Council.

The document also includes calls to the United Nations (UN). Accordingly, the organization urges the UN Security Council to recognize the existence of aggression against the Republic of Azerbaijan, take necessary steps to ensure compliance with its resolutions under Chapter VII of the UN Charter, and condemn and end the aggression against the sovereignty and territorial integrity of the Republic of Azerbaijan. Subsequently, member states of the organization decide to take coordinated actions in the UN for this purpose.

In the seventh paragraph, all states are called upon to refrain from providing any arms and military equipment to Armenia to prevent further escalation of the aggressor conflict and to continue the occupation of Azerbaijani territories. According to the resolution, the territories of member states should not be used for the transit of such cargo.

Turkey's "Kizılay" organization, one of the member states of the Organization of Islamic Cooperation, is one of the organizations providing humanitarian assistance to Azerbaijan in solving the problem of internally displaced persons.

The Organization of Islamic Cooperation urges its member states to encourage their legal and physical entities not to engage in economic activities in the Nagorno-Karabakh region and other occupied territories of Azerbaijan. Additionally, it reaffirms its full solidarity with the efforts of the Azerbaijani government and people in defending their country and extends gratitude to all member states providing humanitarian assistance to refugees and internally displaced persons, while calling on others to contribute their share. In addition to member states, the Organization requests financial and humanitarian assistance from the Islamic Development Bank and other Islamic institutions, which is greatly needed by the Republic of Azerbaijan.

The Organization calls on Armenia and all member states of the OSCE Minsk Group to actively participate in the ongoing OSCE peace process based on the relevant resolutions and decisions of the UN Security Council and the OSCE, including the decisions of the OSCE First Additional Meeting. According to the document, Azerbaijan has the right to receive compensation for the damages incurred as a result of the conflict. Accordingly, the organization places the responsibility for the adequate payment of this damage on Armenia.

== The importance ==
With this resolution, the Organization of Islamic Cooperation member states have adopted a decision to support Azerbaijan's territorial integrity during voting at the United Nations General Assembly in New York. This decision was reached with the active participation of member states in the voting process, as presented by Azerbaijan's Permanent Representative to the UN, Aqshin Mehdiyev, during the 62nd session of the UN General Assembly on March 14, 2008. Still, during the Dakar conference, Azerbaijani Foreign Minister Elmar Mammadyarov expressed the following thoughts:

I call on all Organization of Islamic Cooperation countries to vote in favor of this resolution. Your support will be a reflection of Islamic solidarity and brotherhood towards Azerbaijan.

During the session, Munir Akram, the Permanent Representative of Pakistan to the United Nations and the head of the Organization of Islamic Cooperation's New York group, stated that the conflict in and around Nagorno-Karabakh poses a constant threat to peace and stability in the region, regretting that the relevant resolutions of the UN Security Council have not been implemented to date. Following the subsequent vote, the United Nations General Assembly adopted Resolution 62/243 under the title "The Situation in the Occupied Territories of Azerbaijan." Member states of the Organization of Islamic Cooperation played a decisive role in the adoption of the resolution.

Another significant aspect of the Organization of Islamic Cooperation's resolution is that it underscores the illegitimacy and non-recognition, from a legal standpoint, of any actions taken in the occupied territories of Azerbaijan, including the organization of the voting process, in order to strengthen the current situation and status quo in those territories.

== See also ==
- OIC Council of Foreign Ministers Resolution 10/37
- United Nations General Assembly Resolution 62/243
- NATO Lisbon Summit Declaration
- List of United Nations Security Council resolutions on the Nagorno-Karabakh conflict
