= Göyarx =

Goyarkh / Levonarkh Göyarx / Լեւոնարխ
- Location within Azerbaijan
- Coordinates: 40°19′00″N 46°48′30″E
- Country: Azerbaijan
- District: Aghdara
- Time zone: UTC+4 (AZT)

Goyarkh (Azerbaijani: Göyarx) or Levonarkh (Armenian: Լեւոնարխ) is an abandoned village in the Aghdara District of Azerbaijan, in the disputed region of Nagorno-Karabakh. The village had an ethnic Armenian-majority population in 1989.

== History ==
During the Soviet period, the village was a part of the Mardakert District of the Nagorno-Karabakh Autonomous Oblast. In 1993, the village came under the control of the breakaway Republic of Artsakh as part of its Martakert Province coming under the control of ethnic Armenian forces during the First Nagorno-Karabakh War. The village is on the ceasefire line between the armed forces of Artsakh and Azerbaijan. There have been allegations of cease-fire violations in the village's vicinity.
