= Wind Unit =

Voluntary infantry battalion established in 1992

- Turkish: Rüzgâr Birliği
- Active: 1992–1994
- Country: Turkey
- Allegiance: Grey Wolves
- Role: Guerrilla warfare
- Size: 500 (1992)
- Garrison/HQ: Tovuz, Azerbaijan (1992)
- Colors: Turquoise
- Engagements: First Nagorno-Karabakh War

Commanders
- Notable commanders: Hamit İlbey; Atilla Kaya; İrfan Özcan; Yusuf Ziya Arpacık; Aydoğan Aydın

Wind Unit (Turkish: Rüzgâr Birliği, Azerbaijani: Rüzgar birliyi) or Wind Group (Turkish: Rüzgâr Grubu, Azerbaijani: Rüzgar qrupu) was a volunteer infantry battalion composed of Turkish nationalists. Established in 1992, by Alparslan Türkeş, the founder of the Nationalist Movement Party and the Grey Wolves, its goal was to spread the idea of Turanism in all of the Turkic countries that gained independence after the fall of the Soviet Union.

About 500 members of Wind Unit, who were mostly former special forces servicemen of Turkey, went to Azerbaijan after the Khojaly massacre in 1992, during the First Nagorno-Karabakh War, to train the Azerbaijani forces, though they also limitedly contributed to the Azerbaijani war effort. Despite this, they were removed from Azerbaijan in 1993, and the battalion was disbanded a year later after pressure from the Turkish government.

== History ==
Wind Unit was established by the orders of Alparslan Türkeş, the founder of the Nationalist Movement Party and the Grey Wolves, to spread the idea of Turanism in all of the Turkic countries that gained independence after the fall of the Soviet Union.

=== First Nagorno-Karabakh War ===
During the First Nagorno-Karabakh War, after the Khojaly massacre in 1992, where at least 200 and possibly as high as 613 ethnic Azerbaijani civilians were massacred by Armenian Armed Forces and 366th CIS regiment, Türkeş instructed Aydoğan Aydın and other Turkish officers to support the Azerbaijani forces in their war effort and to "protect the people in the region from massacres." According to Novruz Hasanov, also known as Novruz Hasan Bozalganli, an Azerbaijani police officer who served in Tovuz, the Turkish officers even met with Abulfaz Elchibey, then President of Azerbaijan and got his approval, though a suitable education field could not be found and some of the Turkish officers left Azerbaijan.

Later in 1992, a camp was set up in Azerbaijan, reportedly about 40 kilometres (25 mi) of Tovuz, close to the Armenia–Azerbaijan border, in a Soviet-era ex-scouting camp, to train volunteer Azerbaijani nationalists who would form the basis of a new army in Azerbaijan. The camp provided military and political training to the members of Wind Unit. Military training in the camp was provided by Hamit İlbey, a reserve officer of the Turkish Air Force who previously worked at the Turkish Special Forces Command, and political education by Atilla Kaya, İrfan Özcan, and some other Turkish nationalists. Yusuf Ziya Arpacık and Aydoğan Aydın were also in Azerbaijan as part of Wind Unit. These servicemen were dismissed from the Turkish Armed Forces and served in Azerbaijan voluntarily. According to Arpacık, after President Heydar Aliyev took office, 22 volunteer battalions composed of the Azerbaijani servicemen trained by the Turkish servicemen were disbanded. Arpacık had stated that Aliyev removed Wind Unit from Azerbaijan in 1993 and that this was followed by defeats in the frontline as the military operations were carried out with uneducated recruits.

According to Bozalganli, 500 Turkish Grey Wolves members were serving in Azerbaijan in 1992. Bozalganli also claimed that the battalion was supposed to contain 2,000 men, with the other 1,500 being planned to come from the Azerbaijani Popular Front Party and the Musavat Party. Among the Turkish servicemen, there were no deaths, but several Turkish servicemen were wounded during the war.

=== Dissolution ===
In 1994, after the Turkish government put pressure on Alparslan Türkeş, Wind Unit was dissolved.

== Bibliography ==
- Tekin, Arslan (2005). Son Başbuğ (in Turkish). Ankara: Elips Kitap. ISBN 975-6132-41-8.
- Yanardağ, Merdan (2002). MHP deǧişti mi?: Ülkücü Hareketin Analitik Tarihi (in Turkish). Gendaş. p. 449. ISBN 975-3083-93-9.
- Bozalganlı, Novruz Hasan (2002). Şah Mat: Bir Yarbayın Kaleminden Azerbaycan Gerçeği (in Turkish). Altınküre Yayınları. ISBN 975-8701-03-7.
- de Waal, Thomas (2004). Black garden: Armenia and Azerbaijan through peace and war. ABC-CLIO. ISBN 0-8147-1945-7.
- Azerbaijan: Seven Years of Conflict in Nagorno-Karabakh. New York: Human Rights Watch. 1994. p. 6. ISBN 1-56432-142-8.
