= United Nations General Assembly Resolution 62/243 =

UN General Assembly Resolution 62/243
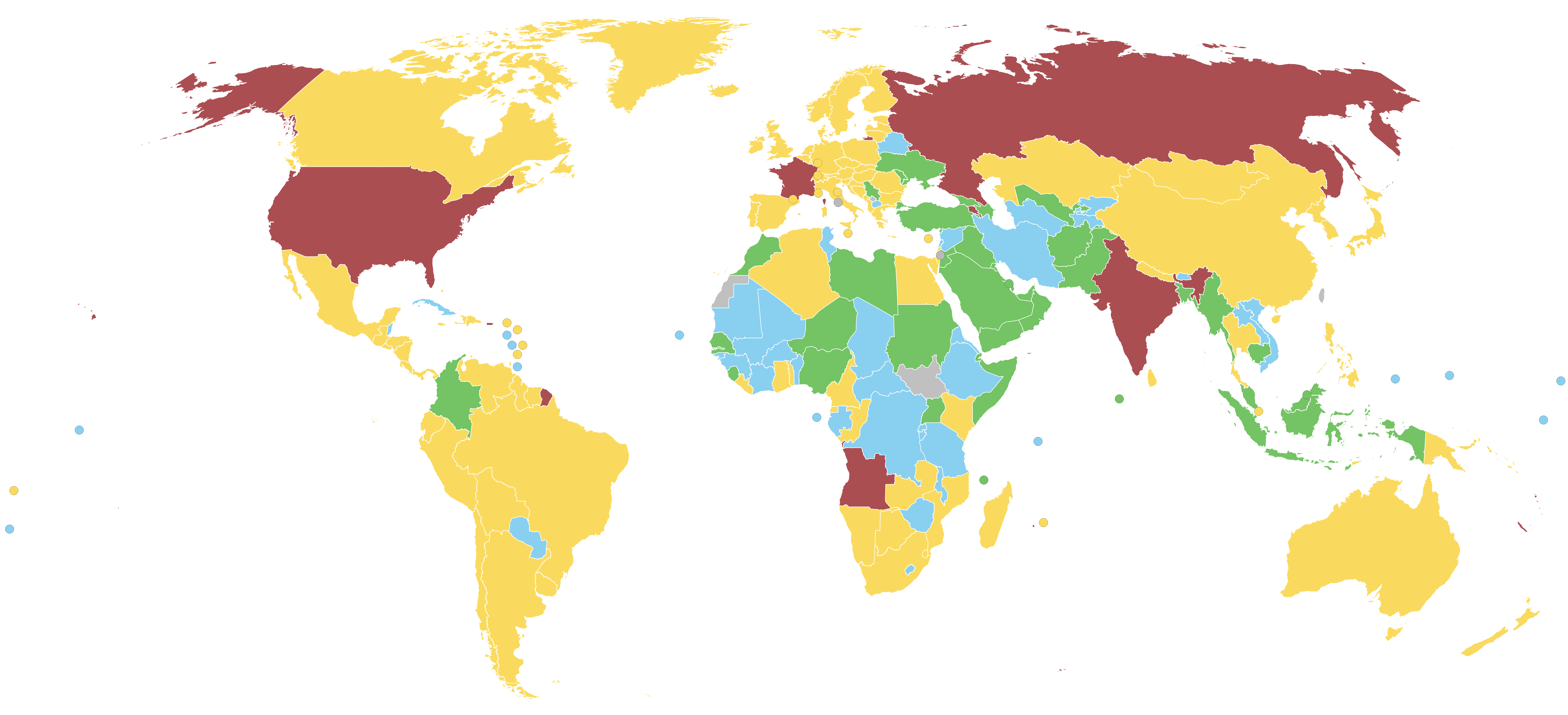
In favour
Against
Abstained
Absent
Non-voting
- Date: 14 March 2008
- Meeting no.: 86th Plenary
- Code: A/RES/62/243 (Document)
- Subject: The situation in the occupied territories of Azerbaijan
- Voting summary: 39 voted for; 7 voted against; 100 abstained; 46 absent
- Result: Resolution adopted

United Nations General Assembly Resolution 62/243, titled "The Situation in the Occupied Territories of Azerbaijan", is a resolution of the United Nations General Assembly about the situation in Nagorno-Karabakh, which was adopted on March 14, 2008 at the 62nd session of the General Assembly. It became the seventh United Nations document concerning Nagorno-Karabakh and the third and last United Nations General Assembly document on it.

The resolution reaffirmed "continued respect and support for the sovereignty and territorial integrity" of Azerbaijan "within its internationally recognized borders", demanded the "immediate, complete and unconditional withdrawal of all Armenian forces from all the occupied territories of Azerbaijan", and emphasized that "no state shall render aid or assistance" to maintain the occupation of Azerbaijani territories. The resolution was adopted shortly after 2008 Mardakert/Aghdara skirmishes, which at the time had been the heaviest ceasefire violation between Armenia and Azerbaijan since the end of the Nagorno-Karabakh War.

== Background ==
As a result of the First Nagorno-Karabakh War, Azerbaijan had to deal with the refugee crisis and significant territorial loss. A Russian-brokered ceasefire was signed in May 1994.

In early 2005 the UN General Assembly's dispatch of a fact-finding mission had confirmed Armenian settlement in Azerbaijan's territory. In 2006 massive fires had occurred in the eastern part of the occupied territories.

Although the Bishkek Protocol and UN Security Council resolutions called for a cessation of hostilities, fighting and artillery fire continued periodically along the entire front. On 4 March 2008 Mardakert clashes began. It involved the heaviest fighting over the Nagorno-Karabakh since the 1994 ceasefire. The skirmishes caused several fatalities. Both sides accused the other of starting the battle. The Ministry of Defence of the Republic of Azerbaijan claimed that Armenians had started attacks on Azerbaijani soldiers. The United Nations Department of Political and Peacebuilding Affairs (DPPA) on the other hand reported Azerbaijani forces seizing positions of Karabakh Forces. After failed OSCE mediation, the Nagorno-Karabakh armed forces launched a counter-offensive and regained control over the lost position. Azerbaijan insisted that four Azerbaijani soldiers and twelve Armenian soldiers were killed and fifteen Armenian soldiers wounded, while Armenia insisted that eight Azerbaijani soldiers were killed and seven wounded, and that two Armenian soldiers were wounded, with no Armenian fatalities. After then, on March 8–9, tensions grew again on the contact line near Agdam; the Azerbaijani Ministry of Defence spokesman Eldar Sabiroglu stated that the Armenian forces had struck on civilian settlements, killing 2 and injuring 2 more civilians. Azerbaijani President's aide, Ali M. Hasanov, called the attack an "Armenian provocation", alleging its relation with protests held in Yerevan. Meanwhile the Armenian Prime Minister claimed the attack was started through Azerbaijani aggression and that he hoped for a peaceful resolution.

Following the skirmishes, the Organisation of Islamic Cooperation adopted resolution 10/11-P(IS) entitled "The aggression of the Republic of Armenia against the Republic of Azerbaijan" at the Dakar conference on March 13–14, 2008. With this resolution, the OIC invited its member states to instruct their permanent representatives to the UN in New York to give comprehensive support to the territorial integrity of Azerbaijan during the voting in the UN General Assembly. It ensured the active participation of the member states in voting for the Azerbaijani sponsored resolution on March 14, 2008, at the 62nd session of the General Assembly.

Before the vote the OSCE Co-Chairs and the EU urged Baku not to put the resolution to a vote. Opposition to the draft feared it could lead to the breakdown of the peace process.

== Legal status ==
Most experts consider most General Assembly resolutions to be non-binding. Articles 10 and 14 of the UN Charter refer to General Assembly resolutions as "recommendations"; the recommendatory nature of General Assembly resolutions has repeatedly been stressed by the International Court of Justice.

While General Assembly resolutions are not binding on the members, they do reflect their opinion. In that respect, it was also important that the resolution reaffirmed, "no State shall recognize as lawful the situation resulting from the occupation of the territories of the Republic of Azerbaijan, nor render aid or assistance in maintaining this situation." Such language is a condemnation of any country actively supporting a movement that does not respect the sovereignty and territorial integrity of the country. Furthermore, previous UN documents, unlike this resolution, did not contain explicit clauses on non-recognition of the breakaway Republic of Nagorno-Karabakh.

== Draft resolution ==
The Permanent Representative of Azerbaijan to UN Agshin Mehdiyev presented the draft resolution A/62/L.42, which was adopted by a recorded vote of 39 in favour to 7 against (including OSCE Minsk Group co-chairs), with 100 abstentions.

While taking the vote upon the resolution, Russia voted for the first time ever against an international document supporting Azerbaijan's territorial integrity. Azerbaijan dissatisfied with the abstaining position of the leading Western states. Uzbekistan was the only supporting country from Central Asia. Considering the arrears, the UN General Assembly did not record the vote by Paraguay.

=== Voted for ===
- Afghanistan
- Azerbaijan
- Bahrain
- Bangladesh
- Brunei
- Cambodia
- Colombia
- Comoros
- Djibouti
- Gambia
- Georgia
- Indonesia
- Iraq
- Jordan
- Kuwait
- Libya
- Malaysia
- Maldives
- Moldova
- Morocco
- Myanmar
- Niger
- Nigeria
- Oman
- Pakistan
- Qatar
- Saudi Arabia
- Senegal
- Serbia
- Sierra Leone
- Somalia
- Sudan
- Turkey
- Tuvalu
- Uganda
- Ukraine
- United Arab Emirates
- Uzbekistan
- Yemen

=== Voted against ===
- Angola
- Armenia
- France
- India
- Russia
- United States
- Vanuatu

== Voting rationales ==
- Indonesia. Indonesian representative said he had voted in favour because the document reaffirms principles and objectives in addressing the Nagorno-Karabakh conflict.
- OSCE Minsk Group. Speaking on behalf of the group, the United States said that the Co-Chairs voted against because they "viewed resolution 62/243 as selectively propagating only certain of those principles to the exclusion of others, without considering the Co-Chairs’ proposal in its balanced entirety".
- South Africa. The South African delegation abstained from voting because South Africa supported the efforts of the OSCE Minsk Group to settle the conflict.
- United Kingdom. According to Lord Howell of Guildford, his country abstained from voting "as the resolution did not take into account the Madrid Principles or Minsk Group process".

== See also ==
- List of United Nations Security Council resolutions on the Nagorno-Karabakh conflict
- OIC Resolution 10/11
- OIC Council of Foreign Ministers Resolution 10/37
