= NATO Lisbon Summit Declaration =

The NATO Lisbon Summit Declaration was issued on November 20, 2010, by the heads of states and governments, who participated in the 2010 Lisbon summit of the North Atlantic Treaty Organization (NATO). Touching upon various matters, it was described as geared towards pragmatic co-operation on issues of common concern.

The document was one of the three declarations, adopted by the summit, the other ones being the Declaration by NATO and the Islamic Republic of Afghanistan on an Enduring Partnership and the Declaration by the Heads of State and Government of the Nations contributing to the International Security Assistance Force (ISAF).

== Contents ==
The Lisbon Summit Declaration consists of 54 paragraphs. Continuing the 2009 Strasbourg–Kehl summit stance in Georgia–NATO relations, the Declaration called on Russia "to reverse its recognition of the South Ossetia and Abkhazia regions of Georgia as independent states" once again. The Declaration also urged Russia "to meet its commitments with respect to Georgia" embodied by the 2008 ceasefire agreement following the 2008 South Ossetia war and subsequent treaty of September 8, 2008. Having reaffirmed the 2008 Bucharest summit decision, the Declaration reiterated that "Georgia will become a member of NATO".

The Declaration emphasized further support for territorial integrity of Azerbaijan amid Nagorno-Karabakh dispute and Moldova amid Transnistria issue in particular. It was noted that protracted regional conflicts there continue "to be a matter of great concern for the alliance". However, because NATO Secretary General Anders Fogh Rasmussen had not supported the idea of Nagorno-Karabakh conflict mediation, the Declaration assumed no legal force in that field.

The key provisions of the Declaration envisage continued support for arms control, disarmament and non-proliferation together with the development a missile defence capable to protect all European NATO member states and enhanced computer security. The NATO-led operations and missions are supposed to be embedded with United Nations Security Council Resolution 1325.

== Reaction ==
The Lisbon Summit Declaration is considered advantageous to Azerbaijani diplomacy: at the 1996 Organization for Security and Co-operation in Europe Lisbon summit Armenian delegation vetoed the Article 20 of summit's declaration, which supported Azerbaijan's integrity, prompting the Azerbaijani side to veto the entire document. The deputy executive secretary of New Azerbaijan Party Mubariz Gurbanli characterised the Lisbon Summit Declaration as "quite significant".

The Declaration was denounced in Armenia. Protesting against the reference to territorial integrity in the document, Armenian President Serzh Sargsyan boycotted the summit, leaving Foreign Minister Eduard Nalbandyan and Defense Minister Seyran Ohanian to represent the country. According to Giro Manoyan, a senior member of the Armenian Revolutionary Federation, the Declaration showed Sargsyan administration's failure to boost Armenia's stance in the West despite rapprochement policy with Turkey.
