= Baker rules =

Negotiation process principles of the Nagorno-Karabakh conflict

The Baker rules refer to a set of negotiation process principles identifying who the parties to the Nagorno-Karabakh conflict are. Armenia and Azerbaijan are identified as the principal parties and the Armenian community and Azerbaijani community of Karabakh are identified as interested parties.

== History ==
The Baker rules were named after the 61st US Secretary of State James Baker III, who was appointed US top negotiator within CSCE mediation efforts to end the Nagorno-Karabakh conflict. The rules on how the parties to the conflict were going to be represented during the Commission on Security and Cooperation in Europe (CSCE) sponsored negotiations were agreed by the foreign ministers of Azerbaijan and Armenia. Since its inception, Baker rules had been the core basis within the negotiation process mediated by the OSCE Minsk Group.

== See also ==
- Madrid Principles
- Bishkek Protocol
- Tehran Communiqué
- Zheleznovodsk Communiqué
