= Jamilya İsayeva =

Kyrgyz politician (born 1977)

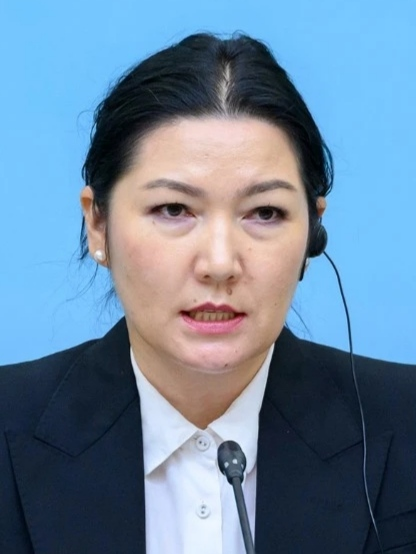
- İsayeva in 2023

Deputy Speaker of the Supreme Council
- In office January 12, 2022 – April 28, 2025 Serving with Ulan Primov and Nurbek Sydygaliev
- President: Sadyr Japarov
- Speaker: Talant Mamytov; Nurlanbek Shakiev
- Succeeded by: Zhyldyz Sadyrbaeva

Member of the Supreme Council of Kyrgyzstan
- Incumbent
- Assumed office December 29, 2021
- Constituency: Party-list

Personal details
- Born: Jamilya Kubanychbekovna Isaeva; July 19, 1977 (age 48) Kyzyl-Adyr, Kara-Buura District, Talas Region
- Party: Ata-Jurt Kyrgyzstan
- Spouse: Kanatbek Isaev (divorced)
- Education: Kyrgyz National University

Jamilya Kubanychbekovna Isaeva (born July 19, 1977) is a Kyrgyz politician who has served as a member of the Supreme Council since her election in 2021 . A member of Ata-Jurt Kyrgyzstan, she was Deputy Speaker of the Supreme Council from 2022 until her resignation in 2025.

== Early life and career ==
Jamilya Kubanychbekovna Isaeva was born on July 19, 1977 in the village of Kyzyl-Adyr. She graduated from Kyrgyz National University in 2000, receiving a degree in banking, and worked as an accountant for various organizations across the country. In 2014 she began working at the Center for Judicial Representation of the Government of Kyrgyzstan and was its deputy director from 2019 until 2021.

== Political career ==
During the 2021 parliamentary elections, İsayeva was elected to the Supreme Council as a member of Ata-Jurt Kyrgyzstan, representing a party-list seat. On January 12, 2022, she was elected as the Deputy Speaker of the Supreme Council but resigned on April 28, 2025.

== Personal life ==
Her ex-husband is Kanatbek Isaev, former Speaker of the Supreme Council.
