= Bishkek Protocol =

1994 ceasefire ending the First Nagorno-Karabakh war

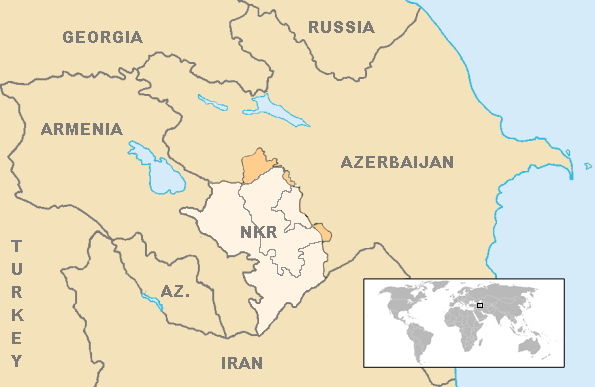
The final borders of the conflict after the Bishkek Protocol. Armenian forces of Nagorno-Karabakh used to control almost 9% of Azerbaijan's territory outside the former Nagorno-Karabakh Autonomous Oblast, while Azerbaijani forces controlled Shahumian and the eastern parts of Martakert and Martuni.

The Bishkek Protocol was a provisional ceasefire agreement, signed by the representatives of Armenia, Azerbaijan, the breakaway Republic of Artsakh, and Russia on May 12, 1994, in Bishkek, the capital of Kyrgyzstan.

The protocol ended the First Nagorno-Karabakh War and the conflict entered a frozen state. The ceasefire was breached on a number of occasions, particularly during the 2008 clashes, 2016 clashes and during the Second Nagorno-Karabakh war in 2020. Two more ceasefire agreements have been reached – in 2020 and in 2023.

== Background ==
Bishkek was proposed by Kyrgyz representative Medetkhan Sheremkulov who was head of negotiating group, and offered to proceed discussions in Bishkek, Kyrgyzstan after the first meeting between parliamentarians of Azerbaijan and Armenia on ceasing fire in Nagorno-Karabakh was held in Mariehamn. Talks between Azerbaijani and Armenian delegations continued for hours. A representative of Azerbaijan Afiyaddin Jalilov questioned the legitimacy of the participation of Armenians who lived in Karabakh, and required to include the name of Nizami Bakhmanov, a member of his delegation who was the mayor of Shusha in Nagorno-Karabakh in the protocol. The protocol and these points were a subject of discussions between President Heydar Aliyev and Kazimirov where it was agreed to include signature of Nizami Bakhmanov into the protocol. Vladimir Kazimirov stated the following in his memoirs: "Aliyev agreed. At the end of the page, two alterations were written in a legible handwriting in Russian. The name of N. Bakhmanov was written by hand but they could not find him in Baku for signature. On May 9, I took a copy of the text to Moscow with two alterations and the name of Bakhmanov but without his signature."

== Signatories ==
- Azerbaijan: Afiyaddin Jalilov (First Deputy Parliament Speaker)
- Republic of Artsakh: Karen Baburyan (President of the National Assembly)
- Armenia: Babken Ararktsyan (Chairman of the Supreme Council)
- Russia: V. Shumeyko (Chairman of the Council of Federation of Russia)
- Kyrgyzstan: M. Sherimkulov (Chairman of the Supreme Soviet of the Republic of Kyrgyzstan
- OSCE Minsk Group: Vladimir Kazimirov (Head of the Russian Mediation Mission)
- CIS: M. Krotov (Interparliamentary Assembly)

== See also ==
- Madrid Principles
- OSCE Minsk Group
- Prague Process (Armenian–Azerbaijani negotiations)
- Tehran Communiqué
- Zheleznovodsk Communiqué
