= Bryza =

Bryza may refer to:

- Matthew Bryza (born 1964), United States diplomat
- PZL M28B Bryza, a variant of PZL M28 Skytruck, a Polish light utility aircraft
