= List of speakers of the Supreme Council of Kyrgyzstan =

Speakers of the Supreme Council of Kyrgyzstan, the unicameral parliament, have been:

Name	Took office	Left office	Notes
Omurbek Tekebaev	27 March 2005	27 February 2006	
Marat Sultanov	2 March 2006	22 October 2007	
Adahan Madumarov	24 December 2007	29 May 2008	
Aytibay Tagaev	29 May 2008	17 December 2009	
Zaynidin Kurmanov	24 December 2009	6 June 2010	
Ahmatbek Keldibekov	17 December 2010	14 December 2011	
Asylbek Jeenbekov	21 December 2011	13 April 2016	
Chynybay Tursunbekov	27 April 2016	25 October 2017	
Dastan Jumabekov	25 October 2017	6 October 2020	
Myktybek Abdyldayev	6 October 2020	10 October 2020	
Kanatbek Isaev	13 October 2020	4 November 2020	
Talant Mamytov	4 November 2020	5 October 2022	
Nurlanbek Shakiev	5 October 2022	12 February 2026	
Marlen Mamataliev	12 February 2026		
