= Dome Bath (Guba) =

Historical bathhouse in Azerbaijan

- Gumbazli hamam
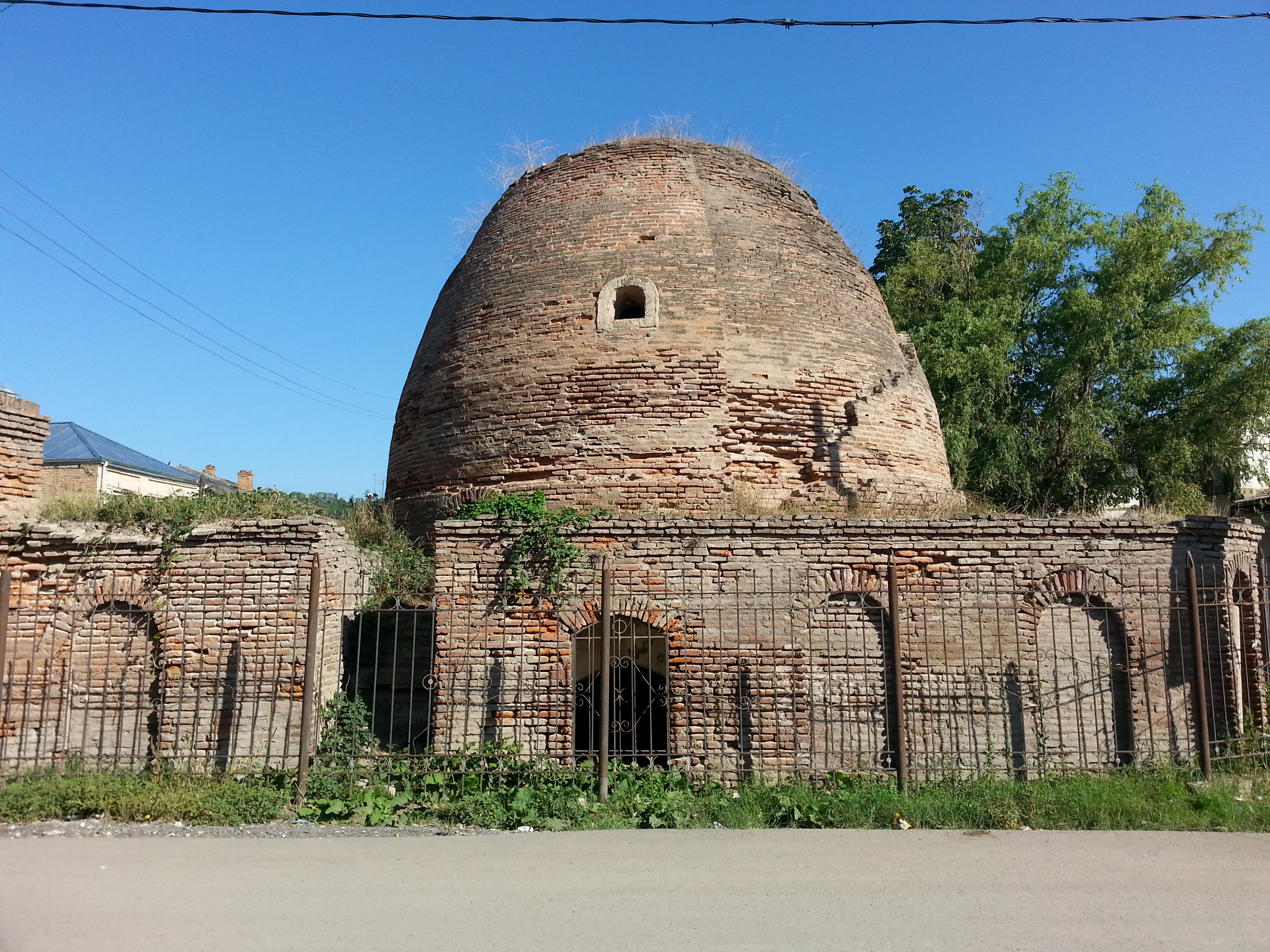
- Current state of the bathhouse
- Interactive map of Dome Bath
- Location: Guba
- Coordinates: 41°21′43″N 48°30′26″E
- Material: Red brick
- Height: 9 m (30 ft)
- Beginning date: 1986
- Completion date: 1987
- Restored date: 2015–2018

The dome bath or Gumbezli ( Azerbaijani – Gümbəzli hamam, Çuxur hamam ) – is a historical monument in the Guba region of Azerbaijan.

== History ==
The historical monument was built in the 19th century. The bath was used for its intended purpose until 1980. The use of the bathhouse was suspended due to the obsolescence of the sewage system. In 1986–1987 restoration work was carried out in the bathhouse.

In 2015 restoration work began again in the Dome Bath. The restoration work was carried out with the joint financial support of the Cultural Heritage Preservation Fund of the US Embassy and the Ministry of Culture and Tourism of the Republic of Azerbaijan . On March 26, 2018, the official opening of the Dome Bath after restoration took place. The opening ceremony was attended by Minister of Culture Abulfas Garayev, US Ambassador to Azerbaijan Robert Sekuta and his wife, as well as the head of the Guba Region Executive Power Ziyaddin Aliyev.

The dome bath is included in the National Registration of Historical Monuments in Azerbaijan by the Ministry of Culture of the Republic of Azerbaijan.

== Architecture ==
The dome bath is located in the center of the city of Guba at the intersection of Musabekov and Ardabil streets.

The dome bath is constructed of red brick. For this reason, this bath is often referred to as the Red Bath. Bath building has one entrance, 6 window

s and one floor. The plan of the building consists of one central hall, 4 rooms intended for men, 3 more rooms intended for recreation. In the interior of the Baths, national ornaments and decorations were used on the walls.

The building of the bathhouse consists of 2 domes, the height of which reaches 9 meters. The bathhouse was heated with firewood. Heat-resistant bricks were laid along the basement of the bath, and thus this method of heating the bath was used both for heating the bath itself and for the floor.
