= Natalya Nikitenko =

Kyrgyzstani politician

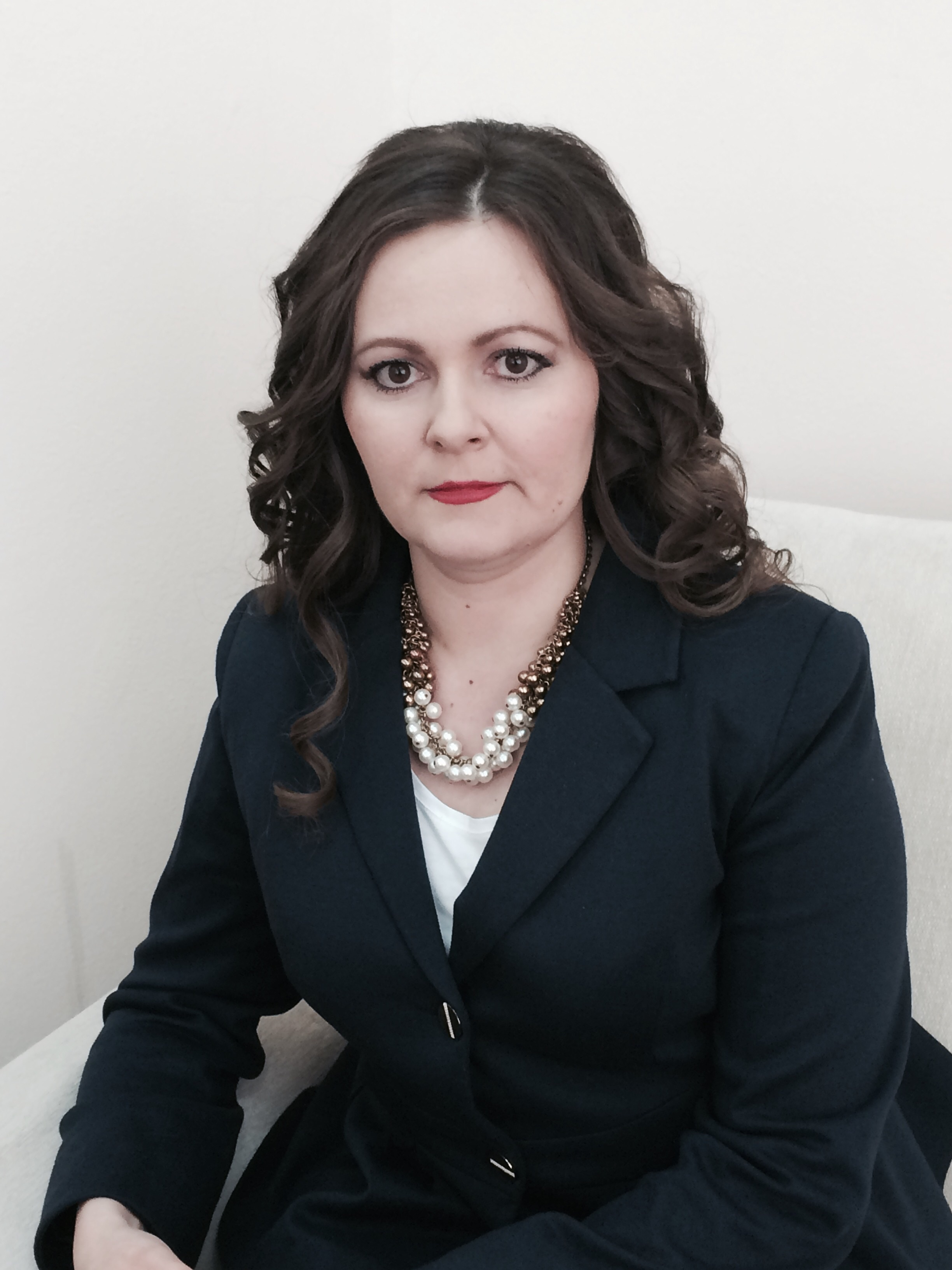
Natalya Nikitenko

Natalya Nikitenko is a former member of the parliament of Kyrgyzstan.

She was Chair of the ‘Committee on constitutional legislation, human rights and state governance’ (2014-2015) and the ‘Committee on law enforcement, fighting corruption and combating crime’ (2018- 2021), as well as being a member of the ‘Committee on social issues, education, healthcare’ (2015-2018). In 2021, she was the Deputy Chair of the Ata Meken party.

She was a member of parliament until 2022 and went on to become director of the Association of higher educational institutions in Central Asia. followed by her appointment to the Director of Parliament Development Center in June 2026.
