= Oklahoma–Azerbaijan National Guard Partnership =

Oklahoma-Azerbaijan State Partnership
- Part of the U.S. European Command State Partnership Program
- Origin: 2003
- Country president: Ilham Aliyev
- Prime minister: Ali Asadov
- Minister of defense: Zakir Hasanov
- Ambassador to U.S.: Khazar Ibrahim
- Ambassador to Azerbaijan: Robert Cekuta
- State Governor: Kevin Stitt
- Adjutant general: Thomas Mancino
- 2012 Engagements: 12
- NATO member: No
- EU member: No

The Oklahoma-Azerbaijan National Guard Partnership is one of 25 European partnerships that make-up the U.S. European Command State Partnership Program and one of 88 worldwide partnerships that make-up the National Guard State Partnership Program.

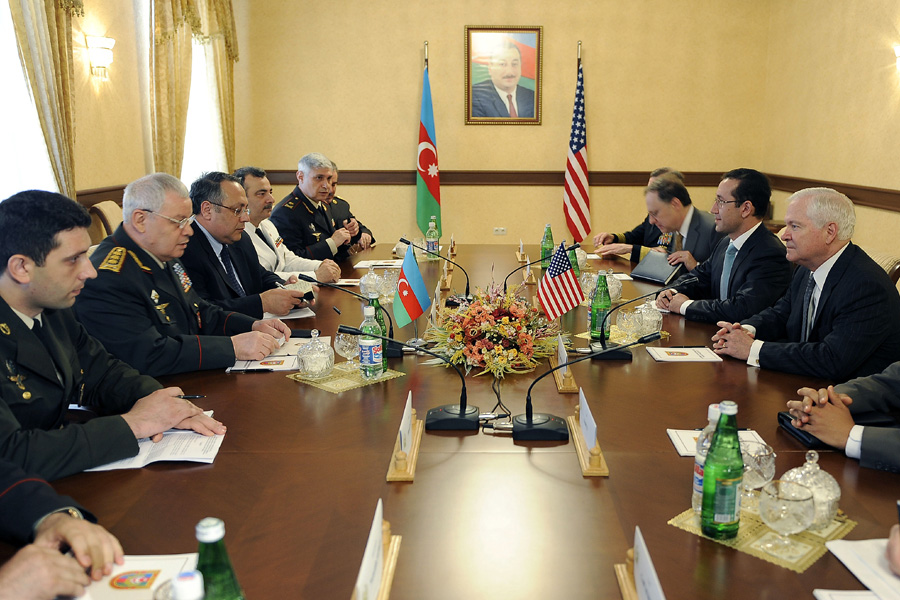
U.S. Defense Secretary Robert Gates and Azerbaijani Defense Minister Colonel General Safar Abiyev, holding a meeting at the Ministry of Defense in Baku in June 2010.

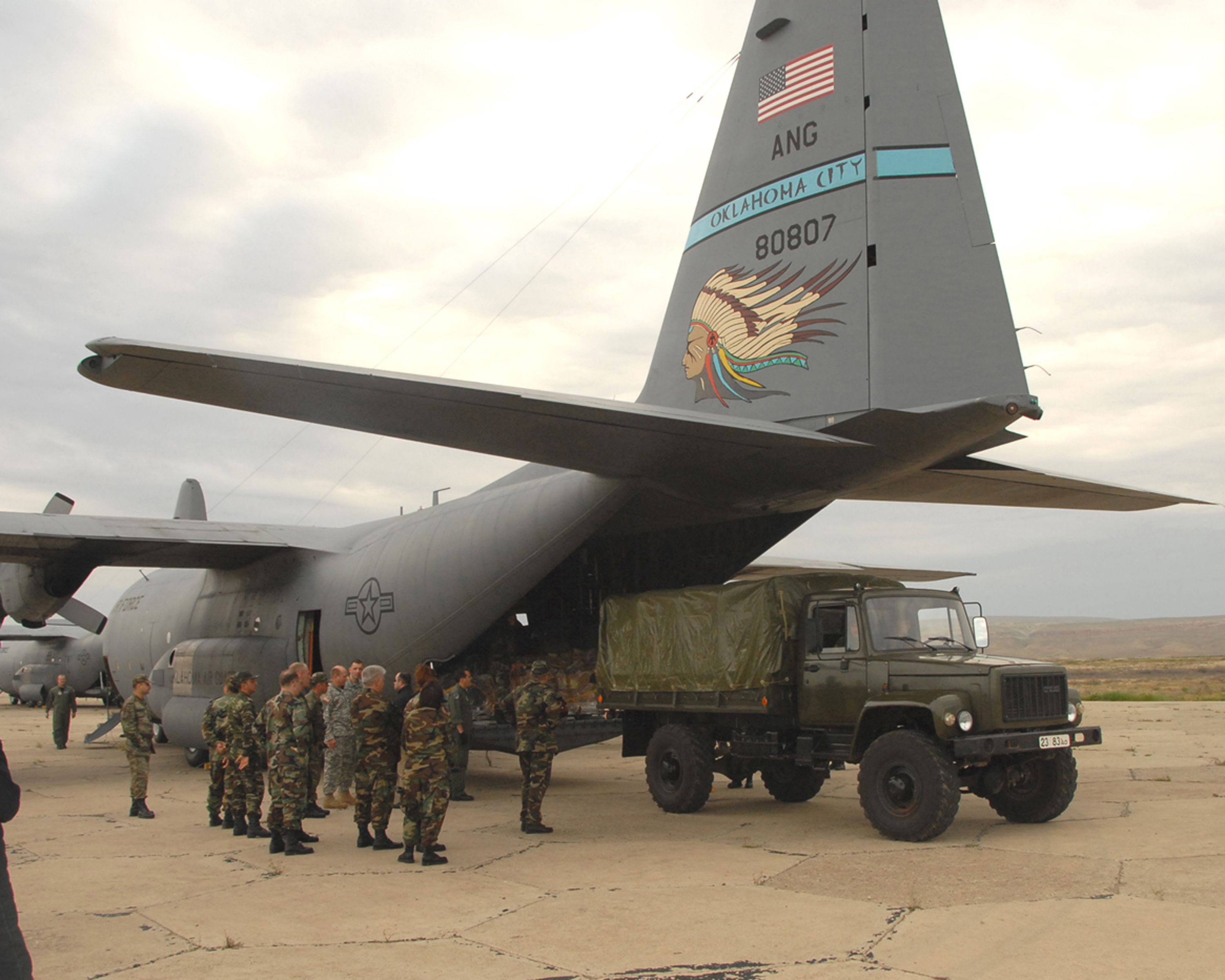
U.S. airmen assigned to the Oklahoma Air National Guard unload supplies from a C-130 Hercules aircraft onto a Russian truck in Azerbaijan in May 2007.

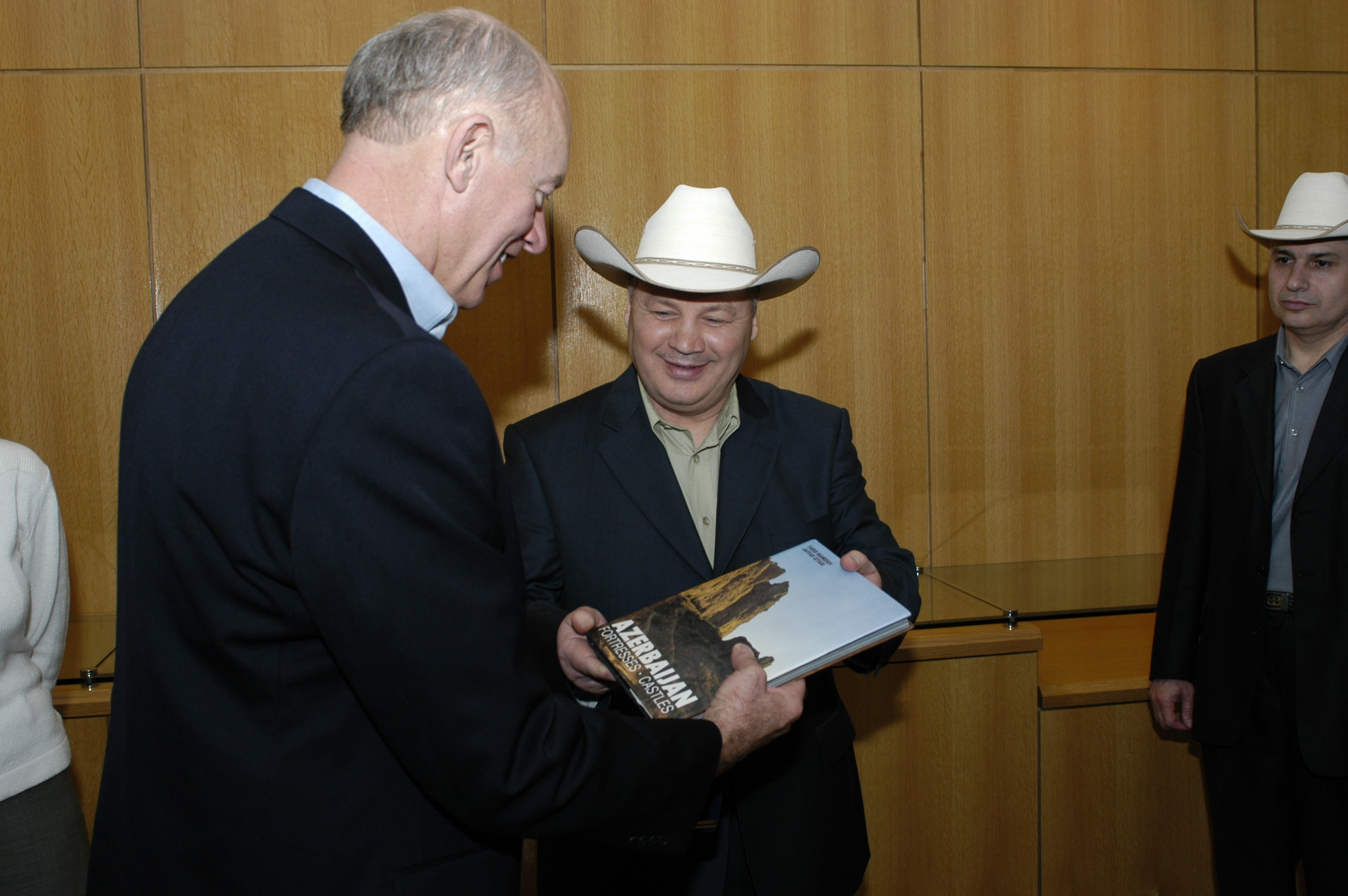
Minister of Defense for Azerbaijan (in cowboy hat) presenting Adjutant General of Oklahoma, with a gift from Azerbaijan.

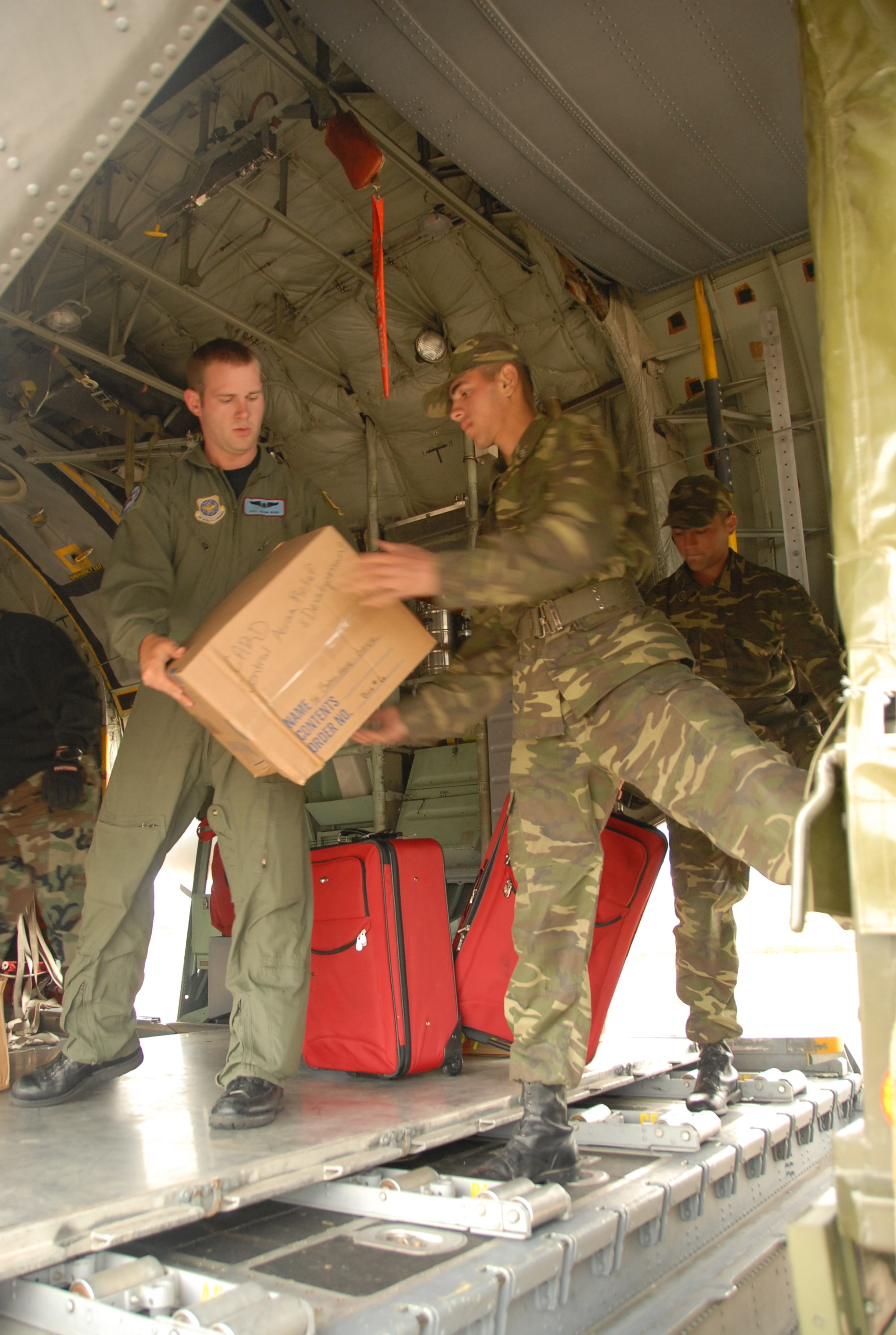
An Oklahoma Air National Guard member offload supplies in Baku, Azerbaijan.

== History ==
- State Partnership was established in 2003
- Armenia–Azerbaijan relations are prominent in Azerbaijan's political and military agenda.
- Azerbaijan seeks to balance relations with neighbors Russia and Iran with that of the US and the West.

== Partnership mission ==
- Emphasis on enabling coalition support.
- Renovation on airfields in Azerbaijan
- Medical University MOUs and Agreements
- Build on established Agriculture University MOUs and current partnerships, USAID and DTRA projects.

Proposed cooperation:

- NATO Interoperability Cooperation
- Hone Agriculture and University Cooperation
