= Free Thought University =

- Type: Alternative education project
- Established: 2009
- Location: Baku, Azerbaijan
- Website: azadfikir.org

The Free Thought University (Azerbaijani: Azad Fikir Universiti, AFU) project in Baku, Azerbaijan was launched in 2009 by the OL! Movement. as an alternative education institution and a platform for discussions to educate Azerbaijani youth on human rights and democratic values through weekly interactive lectures and free debates. The institution has been supported by the U.S. and British embassies in Baku, the United States Agency for International Development, the National Endowment for Democracy, and The German Marshall Fund of the United States and other Western organizations.

== Lectures ==
Interactive lectures by AFU are held twice a week. As of April 2013, AFU organized over 300 events with the participation of 4,000 young people.

Over 80 well-known public figures and experts such as Erkin Gadirly, Hikmat Hajizadeh, Thomas De Waal, Jamil Hasanli, Ilgar Mammadov, Eldar Namazov, Rafig Aliyev, Altay Goyushov, Matthew Bryza, Leyla Aliyeva, Khadija Ismayilova, Gubad Ibadoghlu, Rahman Badalov, Rasim Musabeyov, Sabit Baghirov, Emin Milli, Ali Akbar (writer), Bakhtiyar Hajiyev have participated in the project as speakers. Videos from lectures are posted on the AFU website for people abroad or those who can’t attend the events. AFU website is a virtual university with more than 130 video-lectures on various topics and by experts prominent in their fields.

== Awards ==
The Free Thought University was the first organization to receive the Ambassadorial Award for Freedom of Expression over the Internet from the U.S. Mission to the OSCE, awarded during the 2010 Summit in Astana, Kazakhstan. The University received the award for its innovative use of new media to promote democratic reforms, civil society, independent media, human rights, and the rule of law in support of OSCE values and commitments. The AFU website as the winner of the Milli Net National Internet Awards in Science and Education category in 2011.

== Attacks on AFU ==
On April 10, 2013, officials from the Prosecutor General's Office sealed their offices in Baku without explanation. The next day, the Prosecutor General's Office released a statement, saying that OL! Movement has not obtained state registration, failed to provide necessary reports on their activities to the appropriate government agencies, and received funds from foreign organizations. On April 11, 2013, U.S. Ambassador Richard Morningstar gave a speech in support of the Free Thought University because, as he put it, it "offers a delightful forum for thoughtful, engaging discussion – the kind of thing one finds at any good university campus."

After the closure of AFU there has been tremendous support on social media, with many young Azerbaijanis posting status updates, photos, and thoughts about the importance of this project in their lives. On April 29, the Prosecutor’s Office unsealed the door to AFU and the leadership were allowed to remove the remaining possessions.
