= United States Special Envoy for Eurasian Energy =

Diplomatic position within the United States Department of State

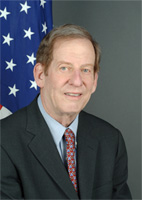
Richard Morningstar

The Special Envoy for Eurasian Energy is a diplomatic position within the United States Department of State. The role of the envoy is to "engage directly with senior European, Central Asian, Russian and other political and business leaders to support the continued development and diversification of the energy sector." The position was filled by Richard Morningstar.

== C. Boyden Gray ==
The legislation calling for the position was drafted in 2007. In February 2008, responding to questions on the issue at a briefing before the Senate Foreign Relations Committee, Secretary of State Condoleezza Rice reaffirmed that the State Department was looking to appoint a special energy coordinator for the Central Asian and Caspian region. Thomas R. Pickering was reportedly high on the list, but he withdrew himself from consideration in early 2008. On March 31, 2008, the Bush administration named C. Boyden Gray as the first envoy to this position.

On 14 November 2008, Gray became part of the presidential delegation assigned to attend the Baku Energy Summit in Baku, Azerbaijan. The delegation also included Ambassador to Azerbaijan Anne E. Derse and Secretary of Energy Samuel Bodman. Gray resigned from this position on January 20, 2009.

== Richard Morningstar ==
Richard L. Morningstar was named to the position on April 20, 2009. He led the United States delegation to the energy conference in Sofia on April 24 and 25, 2009. On July 13, 2009, Morningstar represented the United States at the signing ceremony of the intergovernmental agreement of the Nabucco pipeline. He has strongly opposed the possible participation of Iran in the Nabucco project. Morningstar left office in March 2012 become the United States Ambassador to Azerbaijan, and the role has been left vacant since.
