= Akhmatbek Keldibekov =

Kyrgyzstani politician

- Ахматбек Келдибеков
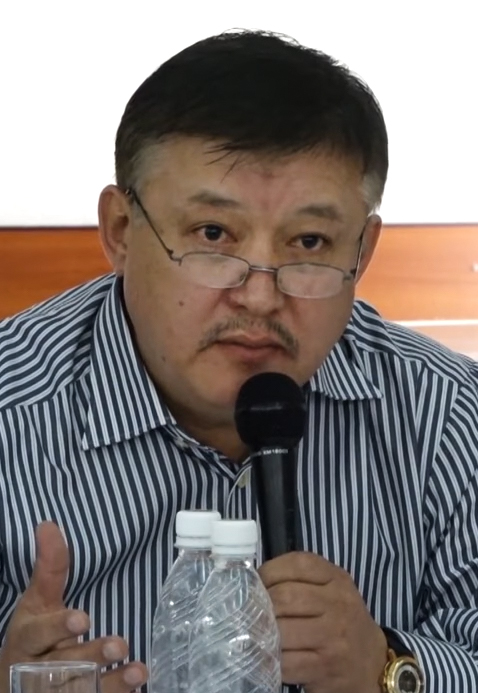
- Keldibekov in 2017

Speaker of the Supreme Council
- In office 17 December 2010 – 14 December 2011
- Preceded by: Zaynidin Kurmanov
- Succeeded by: Asilbek Jeenbekov

Akhmatbek Keldibekov (born 16 June 1966) was the Speaker of Parliament in Kyrgyzstan as of 17 December 2010, in office until 2011. He is a member of the Ata-Zhurt party. He was elected with 101 votes in favour and 14 against as part of the formation of a new government. Keldibekov was arrested in November 2013 and charged with abuse of office and financial misdeeds, sparking protests in his native region of Osh in the country's south. His supporters insist that his arrest is politically motivated.
