= Tehran Communiqué =

1992 in Armenia

- Created: May 7, 1992
- Location: Tehran, Iran
- Signatories: Akbar Hashemi Rafsanjani, Yaqub Mammadov, Levon Ter-Petrosian
- Purpose: Peace agreement between Armenia and Azerbaijan mediated by Iran

The Tehran Communiqué, also known as the Joint statement of the heads of state in Tehran, is the joint communiqué mediated by Iranian President, Akbar Hashemi Rafsanjani and signed by the acting President of Azerbaijan, Yagub Mammadov and President of Armenia, Levon Ter-Petrossian on May 7, 1992 with an intention to end the four-year-long hostilities between Armenia and Azerbaijan over the Nagorno-Karabakh region, a former autonomous oblast of the Azerbaijan SSR.

== Background ==
The conflict over Nagorno-Karabakh Autonomous Oblast of Azerbaijan SSR which started in early 1988 had developed unmitigated and claimed lives of many civilians, interior troops and army. Upon the initiative of the Iranian side, within the framework of diplomatic efforts on the normalization of the situation in Nagorno Karabakh and at the Azerbaijani-Armenian border, the leaders of Azerbaijan and Armenia were invited to Tehran for negotiations on May 7, 1992. The invitation was considered as the third stage of peace efforts initiated by Iran. First mediation stage started in February when Iranian envoy Ali Akbar Velayati visited both Baku, Yerevan and Karabakh but it was quickly halted due to capture of Khojaly and subsequent Khojaly Massacre by Armenian troops. Second effort was made in March when Iranian envoy Mahmoud Vaezi conducted shuttle diplomacy tour visiting both republics and holding several meetings which led to formal invitation of leaders of Azerbaijan and Armenia to Tehran in May.

== The signing of the communiqué ==
During the talks between Azerbaijani and Armenian leaders, it was agreed that meetings between top level representatives from both countries, including military personnel, would be organized and all disputes between the parties would be solved by peaceful means on the basis of principle of the Conference for Security and Cooperation in Europe (CSCE, now OSCE) and international law. Parties committed to international legal norms and UN Charter to ensure peace and stability of borders as well as resolve ongoing refugee crisis. As a result of talks, the parties agreed to open all communications after subsequent visit of Iranian envoy Mahmoud Vaezi to Baku, Stepanakert and Yerevan and involve CSCE observers for continuation of mediation efforts.

However, the peace efforts failed the next day, when Armenian troops attacked and captured the Azerbaijani town of Shusha on May 8, 1992 forcing 23,156 ethnic Azerbaijanis out, in violation of the ceasefire agreement. This significantly undermined the outcome of the peace efforts. Official Baku relied on assurances from Tehran on keeping the ceasefire but with loss of Shusha, even before Yagub Mammadov returned to Baku, Iran was considered morally responsible by Azerbaijani authorities. Final effort of Vaezi to mediate a ceasefire after fall of Shusha with his visit to Baku and Yerevan did not succeed due to escalation of conflict and capture of Lachin by Armenian troops on May 18, 1992. As a result, Iranian authorities emphasized that Iran would not accept any border changes hinting at its disapproval of the Armenian approach of the conflict.

== See also ==
- Bishkek Protocol
- Madrid Principles
- OSCE Minsk Group
- Prague Process (Armenian–Azerbaijani negotiations)
- Zheleznovodsk Communiqué
