= Mark W. Libby =

American diplomat

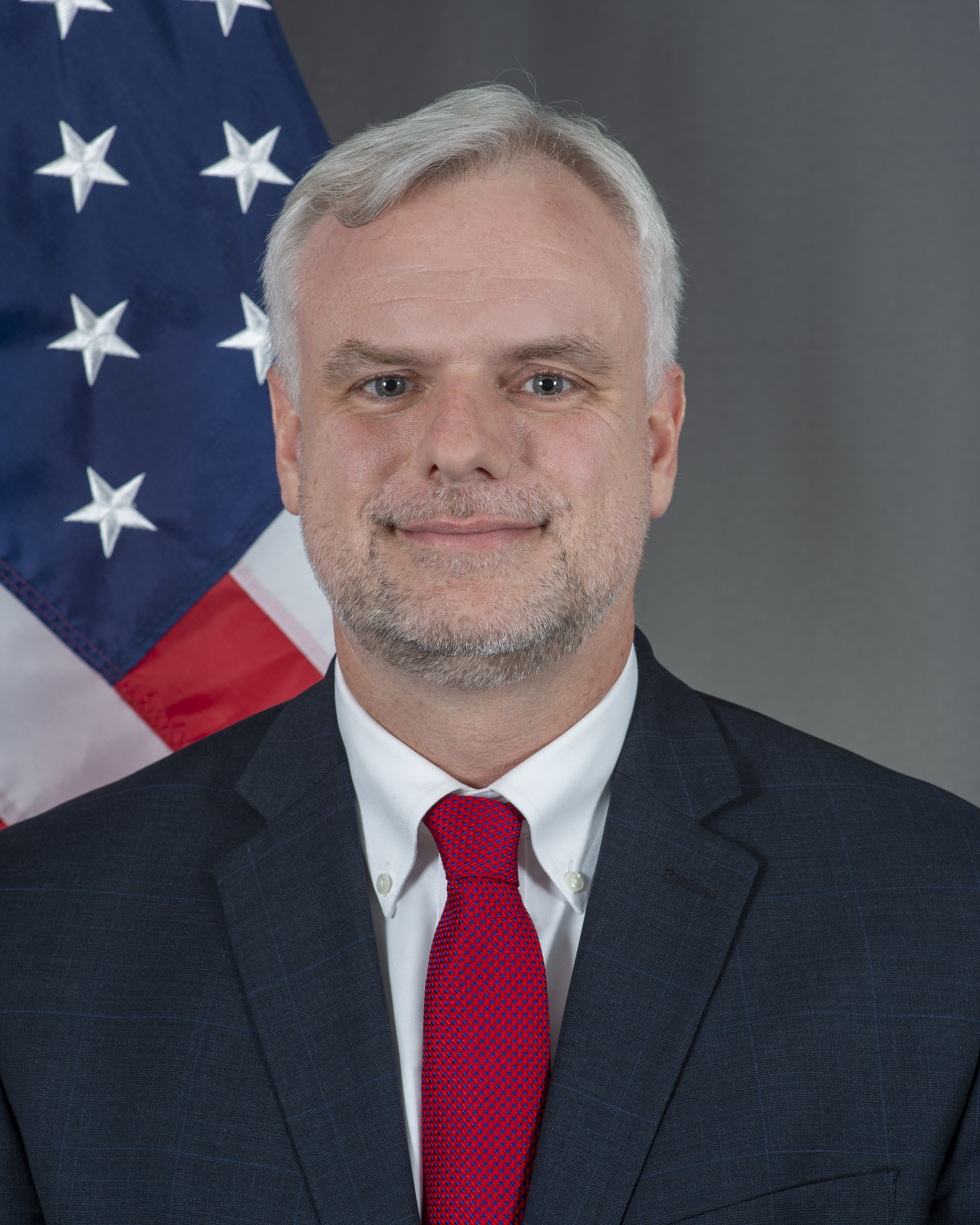

United States Ambassador to Azerbaijan
- In office January 18, 2024 – January 18, 2025
- President: Joe Biden
- Preceded by: Earle D. Litzenberger

Personal details
- Education: Tufts University (BA), Institut des Etudes Politiques
- Mark W. Libby's voice Libby's opening statement at his confirmation hearing to be United States ambassador to Azerbaijan; Recorded June 13, 2023

Mark W. Libby is an American former diplomat who had served the United States Ambassador to Azerbaijan from 2024 to 2025.

== Early life and education ==
A native of New England and graduate of Pomperaug High School in Southbury, CT, Libby obtained a Bachelor’s Degree from Tufts University. He also studied at the Institut des Etudes Politiques Sciences-Po in Paris, France. He earned a Master’s Degree from the National War College, where he was a Distinguished Graduate.

== Career ==
Libby is a career member of the Senior Foreign Service, with the rank of Minister-Counselor. He currently serves as a Faculty Advisor for the United States Department of State at the National War College in Washington, D.C. Previously, he served as Deputy Chief of Mission and Chargé d'Affaires ad interim at the United States Mission to the European Union in Brussels, Belgium. Libby served in several areas overseas, including Warsaw, Nassau, Nicosia, and Baghdad. In Washington D.C., he served as a watch-stander and later deputy director for Crisis Management in the State Department Operations Center. Other assignments within the State Department include deputy director in the Office of Central European Affairs, Director of the Office of Southern European Affairs, and Director of Orientation at the Foreign Service Institute.

=== Ambassador to Azerbaijan ===
On May 25, 2022, President Joe Biden nominated Libby to be the United States ambassador to Azerbaijan. His nomination expired at the end of the year and was returned to Biden on January 3, 2023.

President Biden renominated Libby the same day. Hearings on his nomination were held before the Senate Foreign Relations Committee on June 13, 2023. The committee favorably reported his nomination on July 13, 2023. His nomination was confirmed by the full United States Senate via voice vote on November 8, 2023. On January 18, 2024 Mark Libby presented his credentials to the President of Azerbaijan Ilham Aliyev. On December 3, 2024, Libby announced to resign at the end of 2024 for health reasons.

== Personal life ==
Libby speaks Polish and French.
