= List of chairmen of the Assembly of People's Representatives of Kyrgyzstan =

The chairmen of the Assembly of People's Representatives of Kyrgyzstan were the presiding officers of one of the two chambers of the Supreme Council of Kyrgyzstan.

Name	Took office	Left office
Almanbet Matubraimov	28 March 1995	26 November 1997
Abdygany Erkebayev	26 November 1997	April 2000
Altay Borubayev	25 April 2000	24 March 2005
Muratbek Mukashev	24 March 2005	25 March 2005
