= List of ambassadors of the United States to Azerbaijan =

Ambassador of the United States to Azerbaijan
- Seal of the United States Department of State

- Flag of a United States ambassador

- Incumbent; Amy Carlon; Chargé d'affaires ad interim since June 23, 2025
- Nominator: The president of the United States
- Appointer: The president; with Senate advice and consent
- Inaugural holder: Robert Finn as Chargé d'affaires ad interim
- Formation: March 16, 1992
- Website: Ambassador to Azerbaijan

The United States recognized Azerbaijan's independence on December 25, 1991, and announced the establishment of diplomatic relations on February 19, 1992.

The Baku embassy was opened by interim ambassador Robert Finn on March 16, 1992.

== Chiefs of mission ==
Representative	From	To	Title	Appointed by
Robert Finn	March 16, 1992	September 15, 1992	Chargé d'affaires ad interim	George H. W. Bush
Richard Miles	September 16, 1992	November 5, 1993	Ambassador	George H. W. Bush
Richard Kauzlarich	April 20, 1994	July 20, 1997	Ambassador	Bill Clinton
Stanley T. Escudero	December 4, 1997	October 1, 2000	Ambassador	Bill Clinton
Ross L. Wilson	October 11, 2000	April 24, 2003	Ambassador	Bill Clinton
Reno L. Harnish	December 1, 2003	April 24, 2006	Ambassador	George W. Bush
Anne E. Derse	July 3, 2006	January 22, 2009	Ambassador	George W. Bush
Donald Lu	July 4, 2009	July 2010	Chargé d'affaires	Barack Obama
Matthew Bryza	January 10, 2011	January 5, 2012	Ambassador	Barack Obama
Richard Morningstar	July 20, 2012	July 31, 2014	Ambassador	Barack Obama
Robert Cekuta	February 19, 2015	March 31, 2018	Ambassador	Barack Obama
William R. Gill	April 1, 2018	March 11, 2019	Chargé d'affaires, a.i.	Donald Trump
Earle D. Litzenberger	March 12, 2019	July 26, 2022	Ambassador	Donald Trump
Hugo Guevara	July 26, 2022	January 18, 2024	Chargé d'affaires, a.i.	Joe Biden
Mark W. Libby	January 18, 2024	January 18, 2025	Ambassador	Joe Biden
Hugo Guevara	January 18, 2025	June 23, 2025	Chargé d'affaires, a.i.	Donald Trump
Amy Carlon	June 23, 2025	Present	Chargé d'affaires, a.i.	Donald Trump

== See also ==
- List of ambassadors of Azerbaijan to the United States
- Azerbaijan - United States relations
- Foreign relations of Azerbaijan
- Ambassadors of the United States
