= Marlen Mamataliev =

Kyrgyz civil servant (born 1981)

- Марлен Абдырахманович Маматалиев

Speaker of the Supreme Council
- Incumbent
- Assumed office 12 February 2026
- Preceded by: Nurlanbek Turgunbek

Personal details
- Born: Abdyrakhmanovich Mamataliev; 24 March 1981 (age 45) Bishkek, Kyrgyz SSR, Soviet Union
- Party: Yntymak
- Education: Kyrgyz Technical University

Marlen Abdyrakhmanovich Mamataliev (Kyrgyz: Марлен Абдырахманович Маматалиев; born 24 March 1981) is a Kyrgyz public figure, politician, and businessman, who has served as Chairman of the Supreme Council of the Kyrgyz Republic since 12 February 2026.

Since 13 March 2018, he has been a Member of the Supreme Council of the Kyrgyz Republic from the Respublika–Ata Zhurt party and a member of the Budget and Finance Committee. In 2021, he was re-elected as Member of the Supreme Council to the VII convocation from the party list of Yntymak, and became the leader of the faction. In 2025, he was re-elected as Deputy of the Supreme Council from the party list of the Pervomaysky District.
