= Chynybay Tursunbekov =

Kyrgyz politician (1960–2020)

Chynybai Tursunbekov
- Чыныбай Турсунбеков
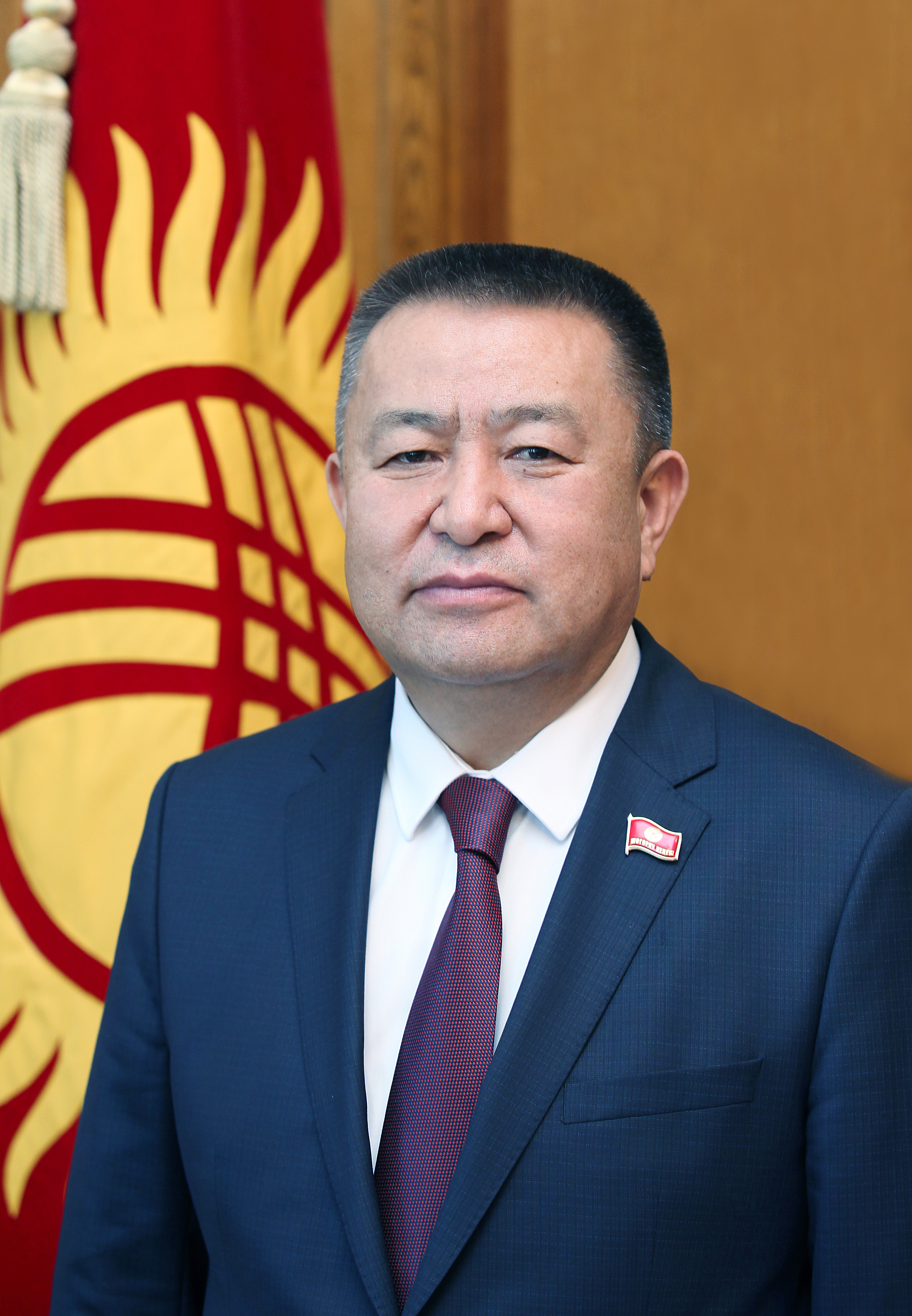
- Official portrait, 2016

Member of the Kyrgyz Supreme Council
- In office 17 December 2010 – 6 July 2020

Speaker of the Supreme Council of Kyrgyzstan
- In office 27 April 2016 – 25 October 2017
- Preceded by: Asylbek Jeenbekov
- Succeeded by: Dastan Jumabekov

Personal details
- Born: 15 October 1960; Jalan-Bulak, Kirghiz SSR
- Died: 6 July 2020 (aged 59); Bishkek, Kyrgyzstan
- Political party: SDPK

Chynybai Akunovich Tursunbekov (Note: Kyrgyz: Турсунбеков Акунович Чыныбай) (15 October 1960 – 6 July 2020) was a Kyrgyz politician. He served in the Supreme Council of Kyrgyzstan from 2010 until his death in 2020, and he was subsequently replaced by Dastan Jumabekov. He was also a member of the Social Democratic Party of Kyrgyzstan.

== Biography ==
Tursunbekov earned a degree in philology from the Kyrgyz National University in 1983, and a doctoral degree from the Kyrgyz Academy of Sciences in 1985. Following his education, Tursunbekov became an editor with the Kirghiz Soviet Socialist Republic's state publishing company. Following Kyrgyzstan's independence, he represented several of the new country's ministries abroad. With newfound economic freedom, he began pursuing an entrepreneurial career.

Tursunbekov was first elected to the Kirghiz Supreme Council in 2010 under the Social Democratic Party of Kyrgyzstan. In 2016, Supreme Council President Asylbek Jeenbekov resigned his post amidst a conflict of interest with his brother, Sooronbay, who had become Prime Minister. Tursunbekov succeeded Jeenbekov as President of the Supreme Council. However, he left the position the following year, ceding it to Dastan Jumabekov in attempt to "preserve the stability of the country". However, instability arose anyway surrounding outgoing President Almazbek Atambayev.

== Death ==
On 6 July 2020, Tursunbekov was hospitalized for acute pneumonia in Bishkek. He was tested for COVID-19, which came back positive. However, his death was announced the following day, with a memorial ceremony attended by the country's political elite. Despite the negative test result, Prime Minister Kubatbek Boronov made a link between Tursunbekov's pneumonia and the coronavirus only a few hours after the announcement of his death.
