= Zheleznovodsk Communiqué =

First Nagorno-Karabakh War

- Created: September 23, 1991
- Signatories: (Russia) Boris Yeltsin (Azerbaijan) Ayaz Mutalibov (Kazakhstan) Nursultan Nazarbayev (Armenia) Levon Ter-Petrosian
- Purpose: Peace agreement between Armenia and Azerbaijan

The Zheleznovodsk Communiqué, also known as the Zheleznovodsk Declaration or Zheleznovodsk Accords, was a joint peace communiqué mediated by Russian president, Boris Yeltsin and Kazakh president, Nursultan Nazarbayev in Zheleznovodsk, Russia on September 23, 1991, with an intention to end the three-year-long hostilities between Armenia and Azerbaijan over the Nagorno-Karabakh region, still an autonomous oblast of the Azerbaijan SSR. Although consensus was reached, the treaty was never ratified.

== Background ==
The conflict over Nagorno-Karabakh Autonomous Oblast of Azerbaijan SSR which started in early 1988 had developed unmitigated and claimed lives of many civilians, interior troops and army.

== Mediating mission ==
With consent from the authorities in Azerbaijan and Armenia, Boris Yeltsin and Nursultan Nazarbayev led a mediating mission on September 20–23 visiting Baku, Ganja, Stepanakert, and Yerevan. Taking the principles of territorial integrity, non-interference in internal affairs of sovereign states, observance of civil rights as the starting point, breakthrough was achieved on September 22 when Armenia renounced all its claims to Azerbaijani territory. This allowed the parties to agree to a joint communique the next day, committing both sides to disarm and withdraw militias, allow return of refugees and IDPs, re-establish Soviet-era administrative order of the Nagorno-Karabakh oblast and set up delegations to find a peaceful solution to the conflict. Soviet army and internal troops would still remain in the conflict zone and the process would be supervised by Russian and Kazakh officials. The peace communiqué was discussed with participation of Y. Shaposhnikov, V.Barannikov, S. Voskanyan, M. Gezalov, V. Dzhafarov, R. Kocharian, L. Petrosian, M. Radayev and was signed by Boris Yeltsin (Russian Federation), Ayaz Mutalibov (Azerbaijan), Nursultan Nazarbayev (Kazakhstan) and Levon Ter-Petrosian (Armenia).

== See also ==
- Bishkek Protocol
- Madrid Principles
- OSCE Minsk Group
- Prague Process (Armenian–Azerbaijani negotiations)
- Tehran Communiqué
