= Prague Process (Armenian–Azerbaijani negotiations) =

2000s negotiations over Nagorno-Karabakh

The Prague Process was a series of negotiations between 2002 and 2007 over Nagorno-Karabakh between the Armenian and Azerbaijani foreign ministries. It was followed by the Madrid Principles.

== History ==
It began in May, 2002, with the meeting of Personal Representatives of the Presidents of Armenia and Azerbaijan Deputy Foreign Minister Tatoul Markarian and Deputy Foreign Minister Araz Azimov at Stirin, outside Prague, under the Chairmanship of the OSCE Minsk Group. A second session talks was held in late July.

The Prague Talks, as announced by the US State Department in September, 2002, would serve as a vehicle for continued communications between the parties as both Armenia and Azerbaijan hold presidential elections in 2003. The process was later continued by Foreign Ministers of Armenia and Azerbaijan Vartan Oskanian and Elmar Mammadyarov who had their first meeting in Prague in April 2004.

The process was mediated by France, Russia, and the United States. According to the OSCE Minsk Group report, a new method of negotiation involved "no agenda, no commitment, no negotiation, but a free discussion, on any issue proposed by Armenia, Azerbaijan, or by the [OSCE Minsk Group] co-chairs".

The first round of Prague Process culminated in Warsaw on May 15, 2005 by meeting of Azerbaijani President Ilham Aliyev and Armenian President Robert Kocharyan. The four meetings between the foreign ministers of Armenia and Azerbaijan, conducted within the Prague Process framework, allowed the methodical re-examination of all negotiational parameters. Both Azerbaijan and Armenia have agreed that if a settlement is reached, five of the seven Armenian-occupied raions adjacent to Nagorno-Karabakh will be returned to Azerbaijan and international peacekeepers will be deployed.

== See also ==
- Bishkek Protocol
- Madrid Principles
- OSCE Minsk Group
- Tehran Communiqué
- Zheleznovodsk Communiqué
