= Dastan Jumabekov =

Kyrgyz politician (born 1976)

- Дастан Жумабеков
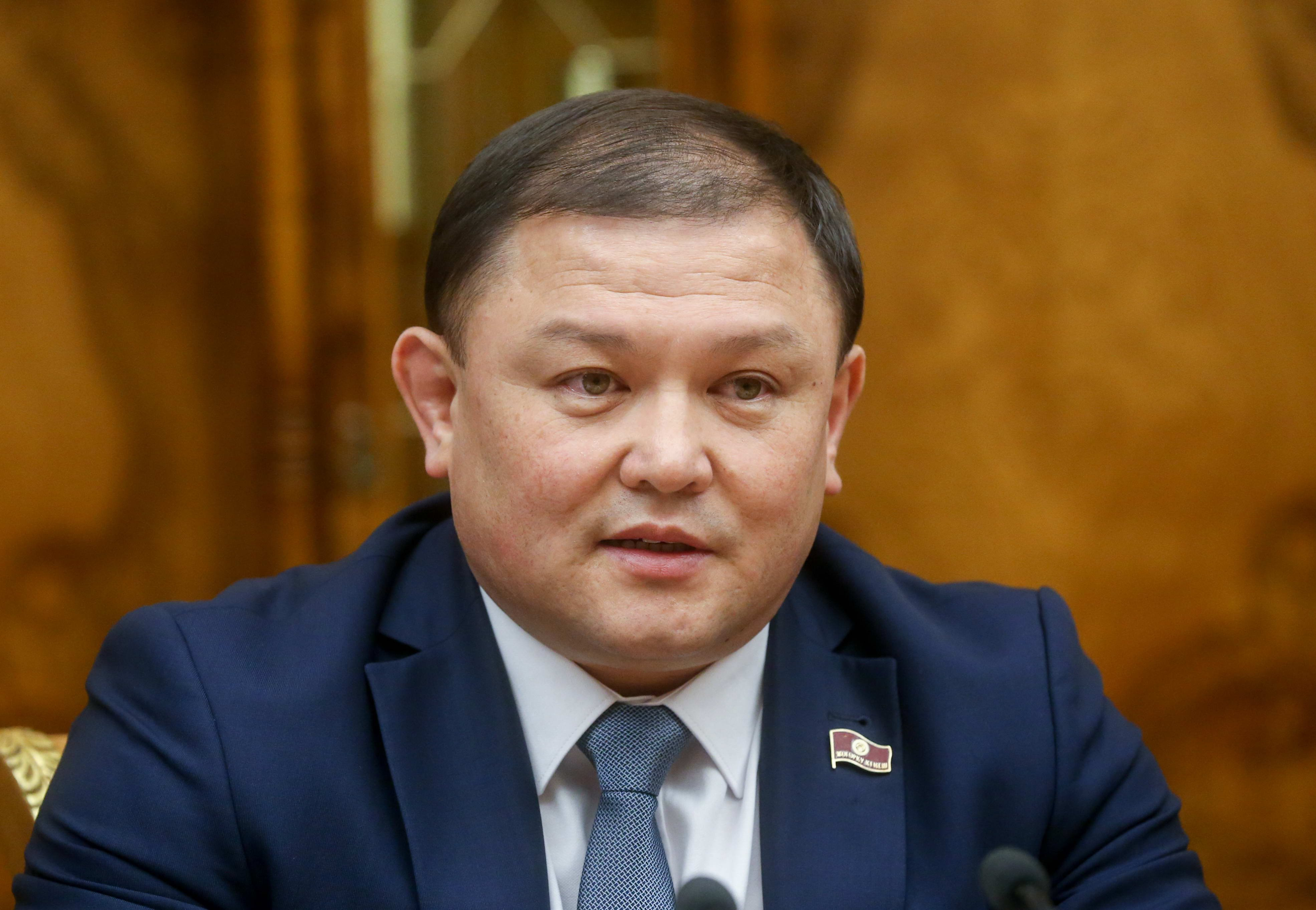
- Jumabekov in 2018

Speaker of the Supreme Council
- In office 25 October 2017 – 6 October 2020
- President: Sooronbay Jeenbekov; Almazbek Atambayev
- Prime Minister: Sapar Isakov; Muhammetkaliy Abulgaziyev
- Preceded by: Chynybai Tursunbekov
- Succeeded by: Myktybek Abdyldayev

Personal details
- Party: Kyrgyzstan Party
- Other political affiliations: Motherland

Dastan Jumabekov (Дастан Жумабеков; born 2 November 1976) is a Kyrgyz politician who has served as Speaker of the Supreme Council of Kyrgyzstan, the country's parliament, since his appointment on 25 October 2017. He was elected Speaker with a vote of 80-30 MPs, succeeding the outgoing Chynybai Tursunbekov, who had stepped down to “preserve stability in the country”.

He was born 2 November 1976, in 2001 he graduated from the Kyrgyz National University with a degree in law.
