= Richard Morningstar =

American diplomat (born 1945)

Ambassador Richard L. Morningstar
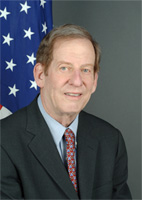

United States Ambassador to Azerbaijan
- In office July 20, 2012 – July 31, 2014
- President: Barack Obama
- Preceded by: Matthew Bryza
- Succeeded by: Robert Cekuta

2nd United States Special Envoy for Eurasian Energy
- In office April 20, 2009 – March 2012
- President: Barack Obama
- Preceded by: C. Boyden Gray

14th United States Ambassador to the European Union
- In office July 7, 1999 – September 21, 2001
- President: Bill Clinton; George W. Bush
- Preceded by: A. Vernon Weaver
- Succeeded by: Rockwell A. Schnabel

Personal details
- Born: 1945 (age 80–81)
- Spouse: Faith Pierce
- Education: Harvard University (BA); Stanford University (JD)

Richard L. Morningstar (born 1945) is an American diplomat. He was former United States Ambassador to Azerbaijan from 2012 to 2014. He was formerly Special Envoy of the United States Secretary of State for Eurasian Energy. Currently, Ambassador Morningstar is the founding director and chairman of the Global Energy Center at the Atlantic Council. He also serves as a senior advisor at Albright Stonebridge Group, a global business strategy firm.

== Education ==
Richard Morningstar earned a Bachelor of Arts, magna cum laude, from Harvard College and a Juris Doctor from Stanford Law School in 1970.

== Career ==
Morningstar started his career with the law firm of Peabody & Brown (now Nixon Peabody) in Boston, Massachusetts, where he practiced law from 1970 to 1981. He then served as CEO of Costar Corporation, and since 1990 as the chairman of the board. Since June 1993, Morningstar served as senior vice president for Policy and Investment Development at the Overseas Private Investment Corporation. In April 1995, Morningstar was posted as the special advisor to the president and Secretary of State on Assistance to the New Independent States of the Former Soviet Union. His rank of ambassador was confirmed by the Senate on 11 June 1996. In July 1998, he was assigned as a special advisor to the president and the Secretary of State for Caspian Basin Energy Diplomacy. In that capacity Morningstar was a promoter of the Baku–Tbilisi–Ceyhan pipeline. In 1999–2001, Morningstar served as the United States Ambassador to the European Union.

Beginning in 2001, Ambassador Morningstar served as a senior director at the global strategy firm Stonebridge International (now Albright Stonebridge Group)

On 20 April 2009, Ambassador Morningstar was named to the position of the Special Envoy of the United States Secretary of State for Eurasian Energy. In that capacity Morningstar represented the United States at the signing ceremony of the intergovernmental agreement of the Nabucco pipeline. He has strongly opposed the possible participation of Iran in the Nabucco project.

Morningstar has been a visiting scholar and diplomat in residence at the Stanford University Institute for International Studies, a lecturer in law at Stanford Law School and an adjunct professor at Harvard University's John F. Kennedy School of Government.

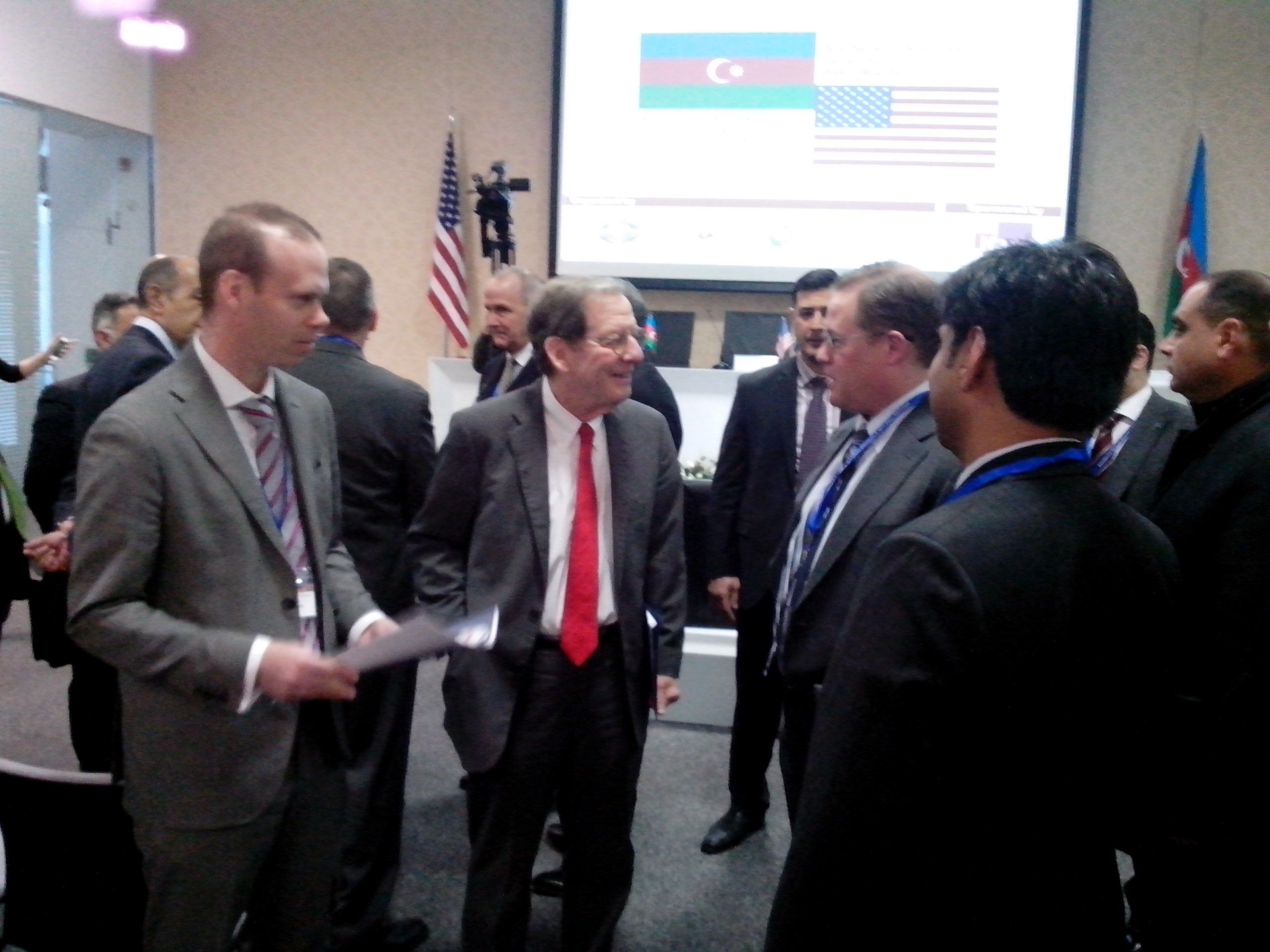
Azerbaijan-U.S. ICT Forum, December 3, 2013

On 27 April 2012, Morningstar was nominated for the US Ambassadorship in Azerbaijan. On 30 June 2012, the U.S. Senate confirmed this appointment. He gave a speech in defense of Free Thought University on April 11, 2013, a day after it was closed by the government of Azerbaijan.

In 2014 Morningstar was named director of the Atlantic Council’s New Global Energy Center.

== Personal life ==
Richard Morningstar is married to Faith Pierce Morningstar, a former board member of the democracy promotion and human rights group Freedom House, with two sons and two daughters. He also has 12 grandchildren.

Diplomatic posts
Preceded by Matthew Bryza	U.S. Ambassador to Azerbaijan; July 20, 2012–February 2015	Succeeded by Robert Cekuta
