= Earle D. Litzenberger =

American diplomat

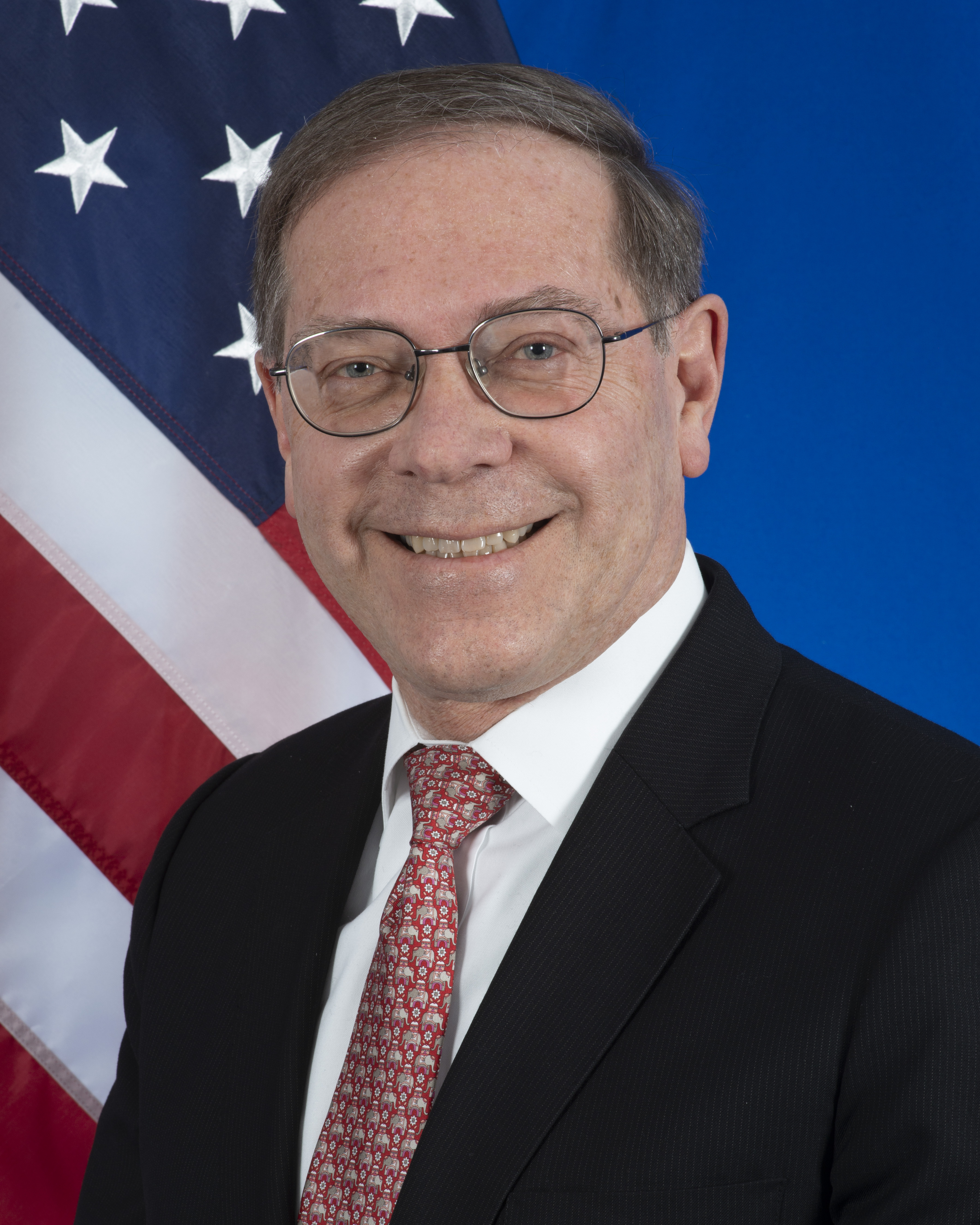
- Litzenberger in 2019

United States Ambassador to Azerbaijan
- In office March 12, 2019 – July 26, 2022
- President: Donald Trump; Joe Biden
- Preceded by: Robert Cekuta
- Succeeded by: Mark W. Libby

Personal details
- Children: 2
- Education: Middlebury College (BA); United States Army War College (MS)

Earle D. "Lee" Litzenberger is an American diplomat who served as the United States ambassador to Azerbaijan from 2019 to 2022. He previously served as Senior Advisor and Senior Bureau Official in the Department of State’s Bureau of Political-Military Affairs.

== Career ==
Litzenberger started his career as a Management Analyst at Defense Logistics Agency and as a Field Interviewer and Tester for the University of Chicago based in Stuttgart, Germany. From 1984 to 1986 he served as Political Officer in the U.S. Embassy in Algeria. He went on to serve as Consular Officer in the U.S. Consulate General in Marseille, France. He has also served in various positions within the Department of State such as Deputy Chief of Mission at the U.S. Mission to NATO, U.S. Embassy in Serbia, and the U.S. Embassy in Kyrgyzstan.

=== Ambassador to Azerbaijan ===
On September 4, 2018, the then-45th President of the United States Donald Trump nominated Litzenberger as United States Ambassador to Azerbaijan. On October, 4, 2018, the Senate Foreign Relations Committee held a hearing on his nomination. On January 2, 2019, the United States Senate confirmed his nomination by voice vote. On March 12, 2019, Litzenberger presented his credentials to the Azerbaijan government.

In 2020 he returned to Washington D.C. to support human rights lawyer Shahla Humbatova as she received her award as an International Women of Courage Award. She was the first person from Azerbaijan to win the award.

== Personal life ==
Litzenberger is married and has two children. He speaks French, Russian, Serbian and Bulgarian.

== See also ==
- List of ambassadors of the United States
- List of ambassadors appointed by Donald Trump

Diplomatic posts
Preceded by Robert Cekuta	United States Ambassador to Azerbaijan; 2019–2022	Succeeded by Mark W. Libby
