= Kanatbek Isaev =

Kyrgyz politician (born 1975)

- Канатбек Исаев
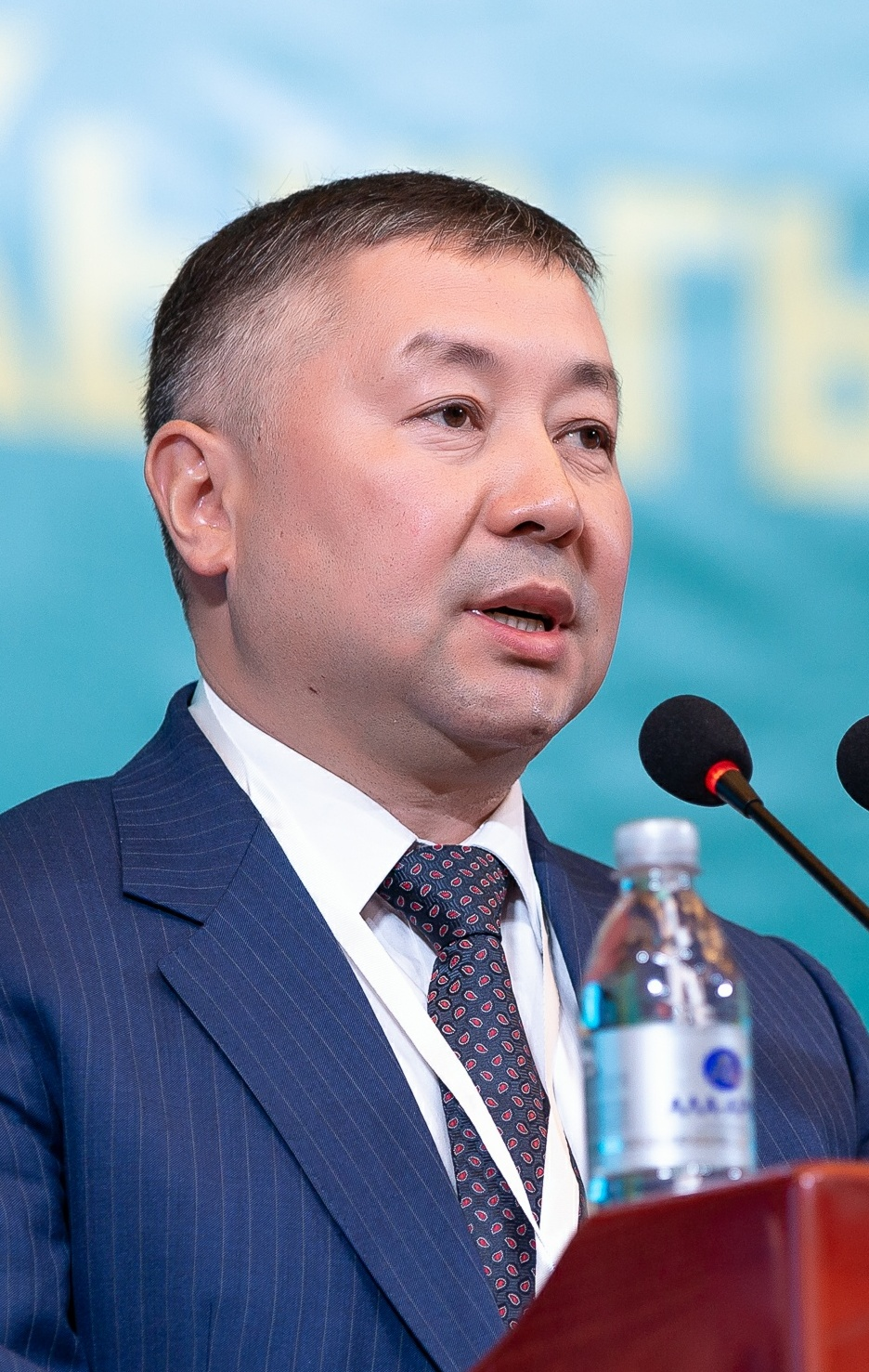
- Isaev in 2019

Speaker of the Supreme Council
- In office 13 October 2020 – 4 November 2020
- Preceded by: Myktybek Abdyldayev
- Succeeded by: Talant Mamytov

Leader of the Kyrgyzstan Party
- Incumbent
- Assumed office May 2015

Personal details
- Born: 7 February 1975 (age 51) Kalinovka, Chuy Region, Kirgiz SSR, Soviet Union (now Koshoy, Kyrgyzstan)
- Party: Kyrgyzstan (since 2015); Respublika (before 2015)
- Spouse: Jamilya İsayeva (divorced)

Kanatbek Kedeikanovich Isaev (Kyrgyz: Канатбек Кедейканович Исаев; born 7 February 1975) is a Kyrgyz politician who served as the Speaker of the Supreme Council of Kyrgyzstan. Isaev assumed office on 13 October 2020 after the resignation of Myktybek Abdyldayev.

Isaev is also the founder and chairman of Kyrgyzstan, a centrist political party that was established in 2015 to support then-president Sooronbay Jeenbekov. In 2017, while acting as opposition leader in the Supreme Council, Isaev was arrested by the state security service for allegedly planning riots before the 2017 Kyrgyz presidential election.
