= List of chairmen of the Legislative Assembly of Kyrgyzstan =

The chairman of the Legislative Assembly of Kyrgyzstan was the presiding officer of one of the two chambers of the Supreme Council of Kyrgyzstan.

Name	Took office	Left office
Mukar Cholponbayev	29 March 1995	15 November 1996
Usup Mukambayev	15 November 1996	14 April 2000
Abdygany Erkebayev	15 April 2000	24 March 2005
Ishenbai Kadyrbekov	24 March 2005	25 March 2005
