= Madrid Principles =

2009 proposed Nagorno-Karabakh peace settlements

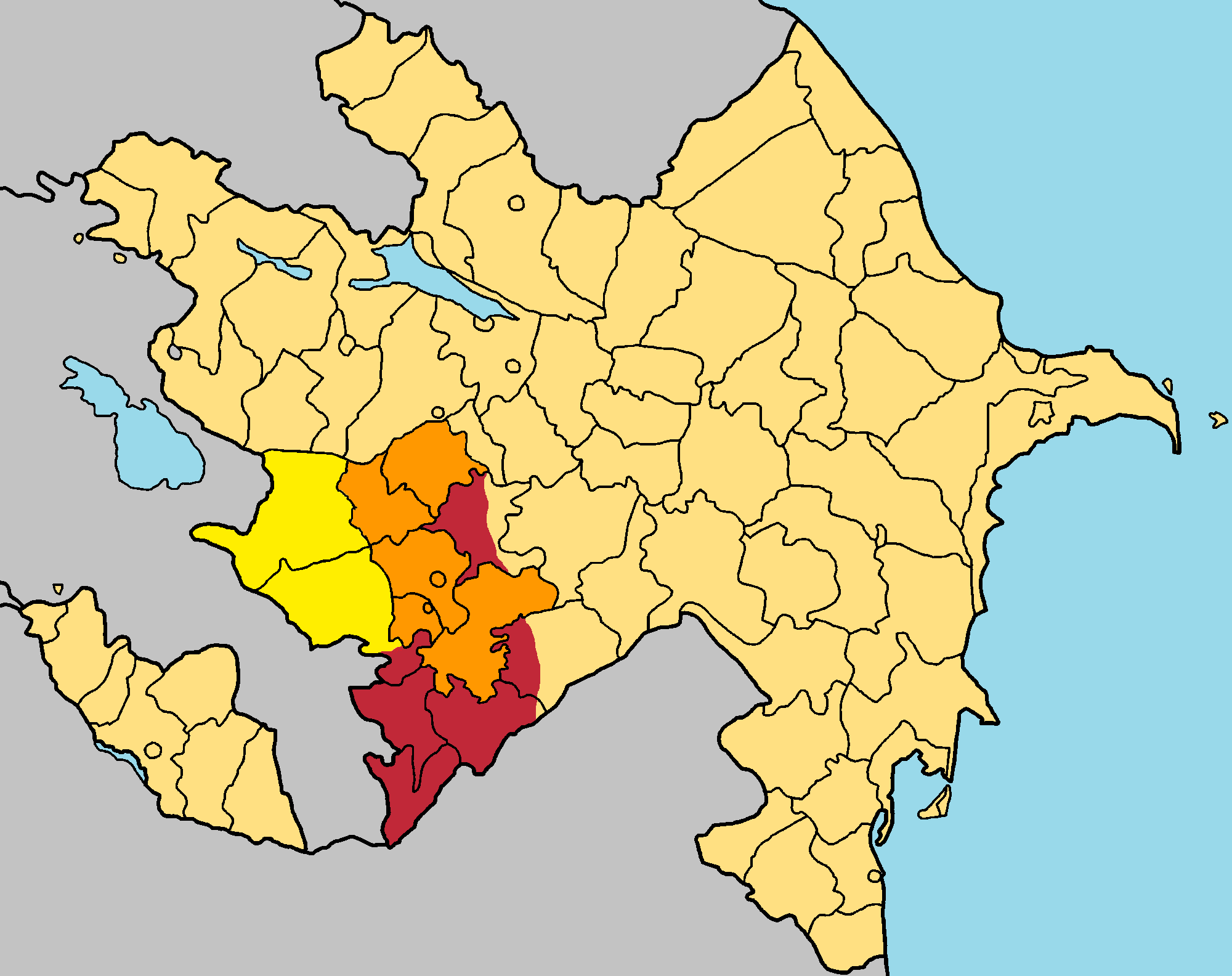
Territories surrounding Nagorno-Karabakh formerly under Armenian occupation Corridor linking Armenia with Nagorno-Karabakh Autonomous Nagorno-Karabakh Rest of Azerbaijan

The Madrid Principles were proposed peace settlements of the Nagorno-Karabakh conflict, proposed by the OSCE Minsk Group. The OSCE Minsk Group was the only internationally agreed body to mediate the negotiations for the peaceful resolution of the conflict prior to the renewed outbreak of hostilities in 2020. Senior Armenian and Azerbaijani officials had agreed on some of the proposed principles but made little or no progress towards the withdrawal of Armenian forces from occupied territories or towards the modalities of the decision on the future Nagorno-Karabakh status.

== Background ==
The First Nagorno-Karabakh War ended with a ceasefire agreement (the Bishkek Protocol) between the warring parties that came into effect on 12 May 1994. From the ceasefire date to March 2016, Azerbaijan and Armenia together reported 7,000 breaches of the ceasefire; more than 100 breaches of the ceasefire were reported and 12 Azerbaijani soldiers had been killed in 2015 alone. The April 2016 clashes were the most serious breach of the 1994 ceasefire until the 2020 Nagorno-Karabakh conflict.

The role of historically recent dehumanization in the resumption of the conflict has been emphasized. Major clashes related to the politics of Imperial Russia began in 1905 and worsened during the collapse of the Soviet Union; these contributed to racialization and fierce nationalism, causing both Armenians and Azerbaijanis to stereotype each other, shaping respective sociopolitical discourses.

During and after the First Nagorno-Karabakh War anti-Azerbaijani sentiment grew in Armenia, leading to harassment of Azerbaijanis there. On 16 January 2003 former president of Armenia Robert Kocharian said that Azerbaijanis and Armenians were "ethnically incompatible" and it was impossible for the Armenian population of Karabakh to live within an Azerbaijani state. Speaking on 30 January in Strasbourg, Council of Europe Secretary-General Walter Schwimmer said Kocharian's comment was tantamount to warmongering. According to a 2012 opinion poll, 63% of Armenians perceive Azerbaijan as "the biggest enemy of Armenia".

In turn, the incitement of hatred against Armenians and promotion of hate speech is one of the main challenges of creating the necessary conditions to enhance the peace process of the Karabakh conflict settlement, as well as to establish an atmosphere of confidence between the people of the conflicting sides: Nagorno Karabakh, Azerbaijan and Armenia. The problem of racism and xenophobia towards Armenians in Azerbaijan were addressed and confirmed in a number of documents which were adopted by different international organizations, including the Concluding observations of the UN Committee on the Elimination of Racial Discrimination (CERD/C/AZE/4 dated 14 April 2005) as well as the European Commission against Racism and Intolerance (ECRI) reports on Azerbaijan dated 28 June 2002, 15 December 2006, 23 March 2011 and 17 March 2016, the Council of Europe Advisory Committee on the Framework Convention for the Protection of National Minorities opinions on Azerbaijan dated 22 May 2003 and 9 November 2007.

== History ==
The original version of the principles was presented to the Armenian and Azerbaijani foreign ministers at the Organization for Security and Co-operation in Europe (OSCE) ministerial conference in the Spanish capital Madrid in November 2007. They originated from a revised version of the peace settlement proposal unveiled by the OSCE Minsk Group co-chairing countries (France, Russia and the United States) in the early summer of 2006. In 2009 at the urging of the OSCE Minsk Group co-chairmen the Madrid Principles were updated.

In 2015 the press-release of the OSCE Minsk group Co-Chairs stated: "The Co-Chairs called for the Presidents of Armenia and Azerbaijan to accept an OSCE mechanism to investigate ceasefire violations. Without such a mechanism, the sides will continue to blame each other for initiating deadly attacks on the Line of Contact and Armenia-Azerbaijan border. Armenia has agreed to discuss the details of the mechanism, and we urged Azerbaijan to do the same."

Azerbaijani leadership had been actively trying to change the format of the negotiations and to take the issue to other platforms, such as the Parliamentary Assembly of the Council of Europe. On 26 January 2016, the plenary of the Parliamentary Assembly of the Council of Europe rejected a draft report titled Escalation of Violence in Nagorno-Karabakh and the Other Occupied Territories of Azerbaijan by British MP Robert Walter. The draft report suggested that the format of the negotiations should be changed. As a reaction to the draft report, the OSCE Minsk Group issued a statement, which reads as follows: "We understand that the Parliamentary Assembly of the Council of Europe (PACE) may consider resolutions on the conflict in the near future and remind PACE, and other regional and international organizations, that the Minsk Group remains, but urge that steps not be taken which could undermine the Minsk Group's mandate from the Organization for Security and Co-operation in Europe or complicate ongoing negotiations".

On 19 March 2016, in his speech President of Azerbaijan Ilham Aliyev openly accused the Minsk Group Co-Chairs of provocation against Azerbaijan and stated that Azerbaijan's confidence in their activities had been completely undermined.

In August 2016, the Armenian National Committee of America (ANCA)—the U.S. Armenian lobby organization—launched a campaign against the Madrid Principles, claiming that because the Madrid Principles were based on the Helsinki Final Act, they were "reckless" and "undemocratic"; the ANCA called for the Obama administration to reject them.

In 2018, Armenia's prime minister and Azerbaijan's president opened the first military hotline. The following year, talks produced a joint statement that appeared to prepare for a treaty.

The failure of the Madrid Principles to progress is seen as having contributed to the 2020 Nagorno-Karabakh conflict.

During the 2020 Nagorno-Karabakh conflict, on 2 October, the OSCE Minsk Group issued a joint statement strongly condemning the violence in Nagorno-Karabakh conflict zone and against targets outside the Nagorno-Karabakh Line of Contact and expressing alarm mounting civilian casualties. The Co-Chairs called on the parties to fully respect their international obligations to protect civilians. The Co-Chairs also stressed that external parties' involvement in the escalating violence was threatening efforts to achieve an enduring peace. The Call also reiterated the need for an immediate ceasefire and the resumption of "substantive negotiations, in good faith and without preconditions". The Co-Chairs also called urgently for an immediate humanitarian ceasefire to enable the repatriation of remains of fallen servicemen in coordination with the OSCE and ICRC.

== Principles ==
In July 2009, within the framework of the G8 summit in L'Aquila, Italy, the three leaders of the OSCE Minsk Group Co-Chair countries, Medvedev, Obama, and Sarkozy, released a statement urging the presidents of Armenia and Azerbaijan, Serzh Sargsyan and Ilham Aliyev, to "resolve the few differences remaining between them and finalize their arrangement on these Basic Principles".

According to that statement, the Basic Principles for the settlement of the Nagorno-Karabakh conflict were based on the Helsinki Final Act (1975) principles of Non-Use of Force, Territorial Integrity, and the Equal Rights and Self-Determination of Peoples.

The above-mentioned document also revealed six key elements for the settlement:

1. return of the territories surrounding Nagorno-Karabakh to Azerbaijani control;
2. an interim status for Nagorno-Karabakh providing guarantees for security and self-governance;
3. a corridor linking Armenia to Nagorno-Karabakh;
4. future determination of the final legal status of Nagorno-Karabakh through a legally binding expression of will;
5. the right of all internally displaced persons and refugees to return to their former places of residence; and
6. international security guarantees that would include a peacekeeping operation.

At the same time the OSCE Co-Chairs urged the presidents of Armenia and Azerbaijan to resolve the few differences remaining between them and finalize their agreement on these Basic Principles, which outline a comprehensive settlement.

== See also ==
- Bishkek Protocol
- Prague Process (Armenian–Azerbaijani negotiations)
- Tehran Communiqué
- Zheleznovodsk Communiqué
- Zurich Protocols
