= Robert Cekuta =

American diplomat (born 1954)

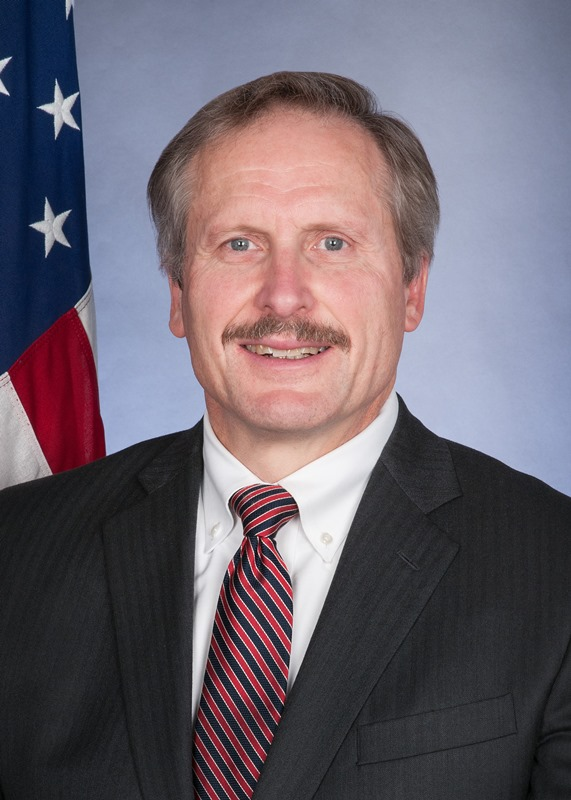

United States Ambassador to Azerbaijan
- In office February 19, 2015 – March 31, 2018
- President: Barack Obama; Donald Trump
- Deputy: William R. Gill
- Preceded by: Richard Morningstar
- Succeeded by: Earle D. Litzenberger

Personal details
- Born: 1954 (age 71–72) Rochester, New York, United States
- Children: 3
- Education: Georgetown University; Thunderbird School of Global Management; National War College

Robert Francis Cekuta (born 1954) is a career Foreign Service Officer, and served as U.S. Ambassador to Azerbaijan from February 2015 through March 2018.

== Early life and education ==
Cekuta attended Georgetown University's School of Foreign Service, graduating in 1976 with a B.S. He then went to the Thunderbird School of Global Management, earning a master's degree in international marketing in 1978. He later earned another master's degree in national security strategies from the National War College.

== Career ==
Cekuta joined the U.S. Foreign Service in 1978 and his early assignments included Vienna, Austria; Baghdad, Iraq; Johannesburg, South Africa; and Sana'a, Yemen. He also directed a task force in Kosovo during the conflict there and served in the Bureau of Near East and South Asian Affairs. From 1996 to 1999, he was deputy chief of mission in the U.S. Embassy in Tirana, Albania.

Much of Cekuta's career has focused on business and trade issues. In 1999, he was senior advisor to the Office of the U.S. Trade Representative and in 2000 he was named director of Economic Policy Analysis and Public Diplomacy in the State Department. Cekuta in 2002 was named director of the Iraq Economic Group in the Bureau of Economic and Business Affairs. In 2002, he was also the bureau's special negotiator for biotechnology. Beginning in 2003, Cekuta was economic minister-counselor at the embassy in Berlin and in 2007 he was sent to Tokyo as the minister-counselor for economic affairs.

Cekuta came home in 2010, first as senior advisor for food security in the State Department and later that year as Deputy Assistant Secretary of State for Energy, Sanctions and Commodities. One of his more prominent roles involved working with the jewelry industry on compliance with regulations on conflict diamonds and gold.

In 2011, Cekuta became the Principal Deputy Assistant Secretary of State in the Bureau of Energy Resources. In this capacity, he acted as a point man for the State Department's views on the proposed Keystone XL pipeline.

Cekuta was nominated by President Barack Obama on July 8, 2014 to be U.S. ambassador to Azerbaijan. Cekuta testified before the Senate Foreign Relations Committee on September 17, 2014, and was confirmed on December 16.

Cekuta presented his credentials to President Ilham Aliyev on February 19, 2015, and served in the position until March 31, 2018.

== Personal life ==
Cekuta and his wife, Anne, have three children. In addition to English he speaks German, Arabic, and Albanian.

Diplomatic posts
Preceded by Richard Morningstar	U.S. Ambassador to Azerbaijan; 2015–2018	Succeeded by Earle D. Litzenberger
