= List of chairmen of the Supreme Soviet of the Kirghiz Soviet Socialist Republic =

The chairman of the Supreme Soviet of the Kirghiz Soviet Socialist Republic (from December 15, 1990: the Kyrgyz Republic) was the parliamentary speaker of that unicameral legislature. It was succeeded by a bicameral legislature 1995–2007.

== Chairmen of the Supreme Soviet ==
Name	Period
Ivan Boryak	July 18, 1938 – May 10, 1940
Kydyraly Zhanaliyev	May 10, 1940 – March 15, 1947
Abdy Suerkulov	March 15, 1947 – July 10, 1950
Bolot Mambetov	July 10, 1950 – August 21, 1953
Kazy Dikimbayev	August 21, 1953 – April 1, 1955
Kurman-Gali Karakeyev	April 1, 1955 – May 27, 1959
Turdakun Usubaliyev	May 27, 1959 – May 11, 1961
Abdykair Kazakbayev	May 11, 1961 – April 15, 1963
Asanbek Tokombayev	April 15, 1963 – July 30, 1964
Beyshenbay Murataliyev	July 30, 1964 – July 1, 1971
Begimaly Dzhamgerchinov	July 1, 1971 – July 4, 1975
Salmoorbek Tabyshaliyev	July 4, 1975 – March 27, 1980
Tendik Askarov	March 27, 1980 – March 26, 1985
Amanbek Karypkulov	March 26, 1985 – December 13, 1985
Turgunbay Sadykov	December 13, 1985 – April 10, 1990
Absamat Masaliyev	April 10, 1990 – December 10, 1990
Medetkan Sherimkulov	December 11, 1990 – September 13, 1994

== Sources ==
- Europa World Year Book 2 (2004)
