= Mukar Cholponbayev =

Kyrgyz politician (1950–2020)

- Мукар Чолпонбаев

Chairman of the Legislative Assembly of Kyrgyzstan
- In office 29 March 1995 – 15 November 1996
- President: Askar Akayev
- Prime Minister: Apas Jumagulov
- Succeeded by: Usup Mukambayev

Minister of Justice
- In office 1993–1995
- President: Askar Akayev
- Prime Minister: Apas Jumagulov
- Preceded by: Usup Mukambaev
- Succeeded by: Larisa Gutnichenko

Personal details
- Born: Mukar Shaltakovich Cholponbayev; 29 March 1950 Oruktu village, Issyk-Kul Region, Kyrgyz SSR, USSR (now Kyrgyzstan)
- Died: 24 May 2020 (aged 70) Bishkek, Kyrgyzstan

Mukar Shaltakovich Cholponbayev (Kyrgyz: Мукар Шалтакович Чолпонбаев; 29 March 1950 – 24 May 2020) was a Kyrgyzstani politician.

== Life ==
Cholponbayev was born on 29 March 1950 in Issyk-Kul Region, Kyrgyz SSR. He graduated from Kyrgyz National University in 1976. From 1984 to 1991, he served as Deputy Head of the Legal Department of the Supreme Council of the Kyrgyz SSR, and later was promoted to Head of the Legal Department.

After the collapse of the Soviet Union, from 1991 to 1993, he served as the Head of Department of Justice of Chuy Region, and Head of the Presidential Administration Department. Later, he served as Minister of Justice (1993–95), and the Chairman of the Legislative Assembly of Kyrgyzstan (1995–96).

He died in Bishkek on 24 May 2020, after contracting COVID-19 during the COVID-19 pandemic in Kyrgyzstan.
