= Nurlanbek Turgunbek uulu =

Speaker of the Supreme Council of Kyrgyzstan since 2022

- Нурланбек Тургунбек уулу
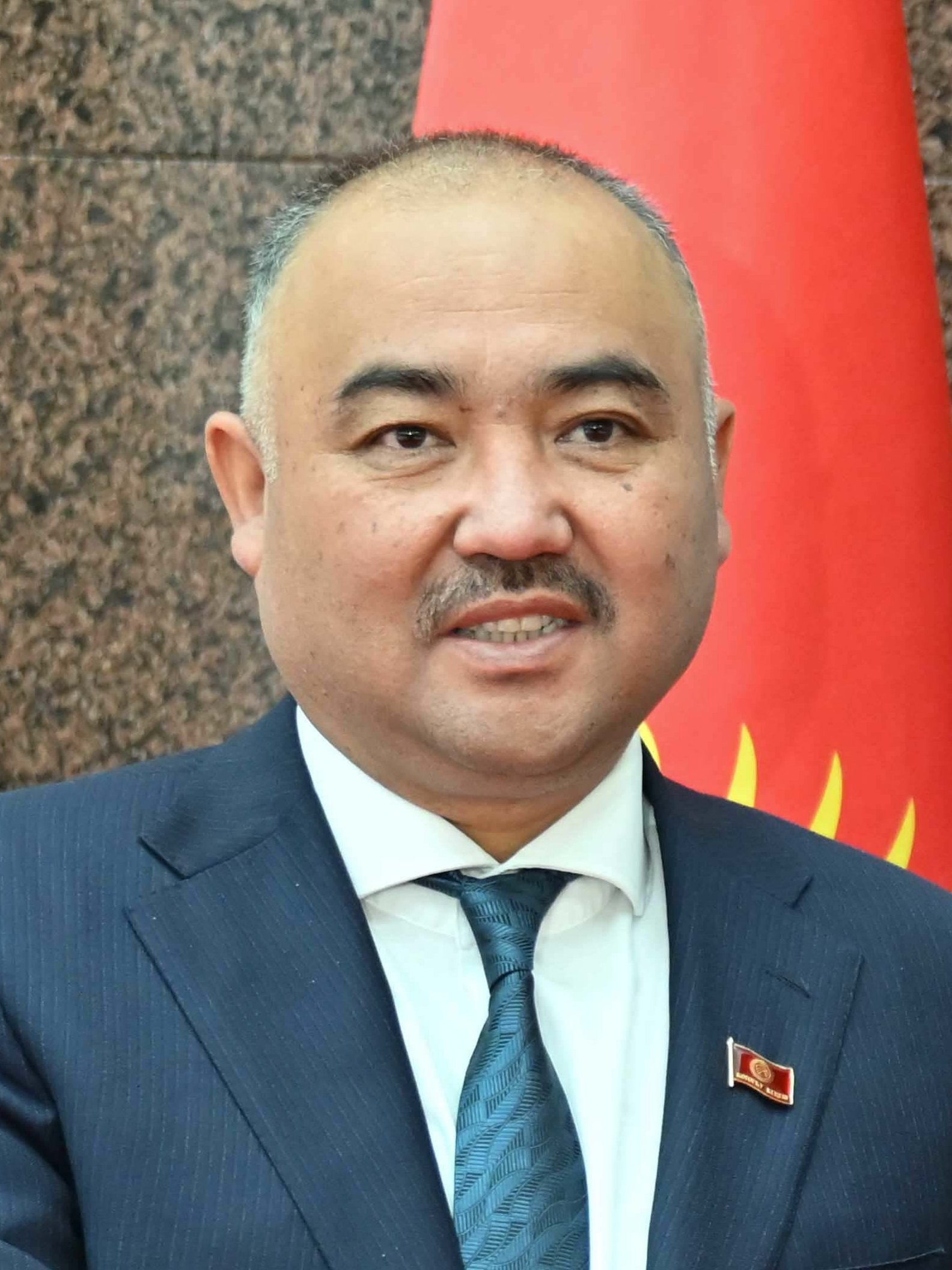
- Nurlanbek in 2023

Speaker of the Supreme Council
- In office 5 October 2022 – 12 February 2026
- Preceded by: Talant Mamytov
- Succeeded by: Marlen Mamataliev

Personal details
- Born: Nurlanbek Turgunbekovich Shakiev; 13 May 1977 (age 49) Kara-Jygach, Kyrgyz SSR, Soviet Union
- Party: Ata-Jurt Kyrgyzstan

Nurlanbek Turgunbek uulu (Kyrgyz: Нурланбек Тургунбек уулу; born Nurlanbek Turgunbekovich Shakiev; Kyrgyz: Нурланбек Тургунбекович Шакиев; 13 May 1977) is a Kyrgyz politician who has been the Speaker of the Supreme Council and in the Supreme Council since 2022, as a member of Ata-Jurt Kyrgyzstan. Prior to his political career, he was a press secretary for the Kyrgyz government, newspaper editor, and television director general.

== Early life and education ==
Nurlanbek Turgunbekovich Shakiev was born in Kara-Jygach, Kyrgyz SSR, Soviet Union, on 13 May 1977. He graduated from the Kyrgyz National Agrarian University in 1999.

== Career ==
Nurlanbek was the deputy editor-in-chief and then editor-in-chief at the newspapers Obon from 1996 to 1997, Uchkun from 1997 to 1999, Erkin-Too from 1999 to 2004, and Erkin-Too from 2005 to 2006. He was director general of the television and radio company EITR from 2009 to 2010, and Channel 2 from 2017 to 2021.

Nurlanbek was the press secretary of the Ministry of Transport in 2004, and President of Kyrgyzstan from 2006 to 2009. He was the Minister of Culture and Information from 2010 to 2011.

In the 2021 parliamentary election, Nurlanbek won a seat in the Supreme Council from district 17 in Aksy. The Ata-Zhurt Kyrgyzstan's parliamentary group elected Nurlanbek as its leader on 29 March. He was elected Speaker with no opposition and by a vote of 80 to 6 in favour on 5 October 2022.

== Personal life ==
In 2025, Nurlanbek changed his last name from Shakiev to Turgunbek uulu and called for others to change their names in accordance with their Kyrgyz heritage.

== Works cited ==
=== News ===
- "Nurlanbek Shakiev becomes Speaker of Parliament of Kyrgyzstan". 24.kg. 5 October 2022. Archived from the original on 20 May 2025.
- "Speaker of Parliament Nurlanbek Shakiev changes his last name". 24.kg. 13 January 2025. Archived from the original on 14 February 2025.

=== Web ===
- "Тургунбек уулу Нурланбек". Supreme Council. Archived from the original on 24 January 2025.
- "Nurlanbek Turgunbek uulu". TURKPA. Archived from the original on 5 July 2025.
