= Supreme Council (Kyrgyzstan) =

Unicameral parliament of Kyrgyzstan

Supreme Council Жогорку Кеңеш (Kyrgyz) Верховный Совет (Russian)
- 8th Supreme Council
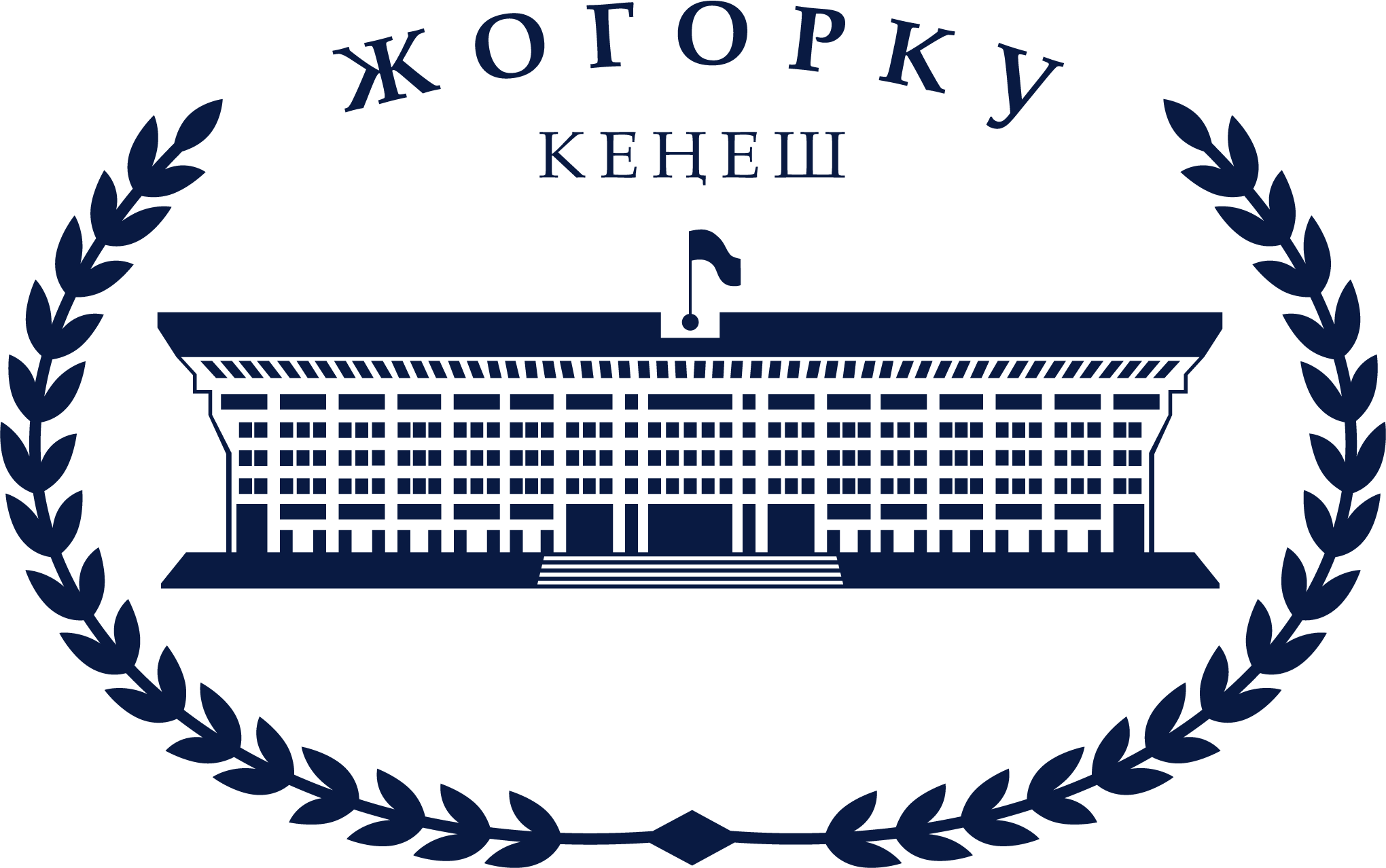

Type
- Type: Unicameral

History
- Founded: 1994
- Preceded by: Supreme Soviet of the Kirghiz SSR

Leadership
- Speaker: Marlen Mamataliev, Yntymak since 12 February 2026
- Chairman of the Cabinet of Ministers: Adylbek Kasymaliev, Ar-Namys since 16 December 2024

Structure
- Seats: 90
- Political groups: Mekenchil (19); Ata-Zhurt (18); Eldik (17); Yntymak (2); Ala-Too (15); Adilet Kyrgyzstan (14); Ungrouped (4); Yntymak (1); Vacant (3): Vacant (3)
- Length of term: 5 years

Elections
- Voting system: Single non-transferable vote
- First election: 5 February 1995
- Last election: 30 November 2025
- Next election: By 2030

Meeting place
- Jogorku Kenesh Building, Bishkek

Website
- www.kenesh.kg

The Supreme Council of Kyrgyzstan, also known as the Jogorku Kenesh (Kyrgyz: Жогорку Кеңеш, romanized: Zhogorku Kengesh, IPA: [t͡ɕoʁoɾqʊ́ kʰeŋéɕ]), is the unicameral parliament of Kyrgyzstan. Before Kyrgyzstan's independence from the Soviet Union in 1991, it was known as the Supreme Soviet of the Kirghiz Soviet Socialist Republic.

The parliament has 90 seats, with members elected for a five-year term by in 30 3-seat constituencies using single non-transferable vote.

== History ==
During Soviet rule, it was known as the Supreme Soviet of the Kirghiz SSR.

From August 1991, when Kyrgyzstan gained independence from the Soviet Union, until October 2007, when the Constitution was changed in a referendum, the Supreme Council consisted of the Legislative Assembly (Мыйзам Чыгаруу Жыйыны, Myizam Chygaruu Jyiyny; lit. 'Upper House') and the Assembly of People's Representatives (Эл Өкүлдөр Жыйыны, El Öküldör Jyiyny; lit. 'Lower House') with 60 and 45 members, respectively. The members of both houses were elected to five-year terms. In the Assembly of People's Representatives all 45 members were elected in single-seat constituencies; in the Legislative Assembly 45 members were elected in single-seat constituencies and 15 were elected through party lists.

Since October 2007, the Supreme Council is a unicameral legislature. Originally it consisted of 90 members, however when in 2010 President Kurmanbek Bakiyev was ousted during the Kyrgyz Revolution, a new Constitution was adopted, that increased the number of members to 120. Parties are limited to 65 seats in order to prevent power concentration. A vote on a new constitution cut the number of seats in the parliament by 25%, thereby returning to 90 seats.

Of those 90 seats, 54 were elected by proportional representation in a single nationwide constituency, and 36 in single-seat districts. To win seats, parties were required to pass a national electoral threshold of 5% of the votes cast (down from 7% in the October 2020 elections), and receive at least 0.5% of the vote in each of the seven regions. The lists were open, with voters able to cast a single preferential vote. No one party was allowed to be given more than half of the proportional seats. Party lists were required to have at least 30% of the candidates from each gender, and every fourth candidate had to be of a different gender. Each list was also required to have at least 15% of the candidates being from ethnic minorities and 15% of under 35 years old, as well as at least two candidates with disabilities.

== Electoral system ==
The 90 seats in the Supreme Council are elected by single non-transferable vote, with the country being divided into 30 three-member constituencies, with voters casting a single vote and the top three candidates being elected, though one seat per constituency is reserved for the highest-polling woman and one for the highest-polling man. Candidates may run either as independents or as nominees of a political party.

== Speakers ==
The first legislature of Kyrgyzstan was Supreme Soviet until 1994.

Bicameral legislature was established in 1995, and replaced with unicameral legislature, Supreme Council, in 2005.

Chairmen of the Assembly of People's Representatives of Kyrgyzstan was the presiding officer of one of the two chambers of the Supreme Council.

Name	Took office	Left office
Almanbet Matubraimov	29 March 1995	26 November 1997
Abdıganı Erkebayev	26 November 1997	April 2000
Altay Borubayev	25 April 2000	24 March 2005
Muratbek Mukashev	24 March 2005	25 March 2005

The Chairman of the Legislative Assembly of Kyrgyzstan was the presiding officer of one of the two chambers of the Supreme Council.

Name	Took office	Left office
Mukar Cholponbayev	29 March 1995	15 November 1996
Usup Mukambayev	15 November 1996	14 April 2000
Abdıganı Erkebayev	15 April 2000	24 March 2005
Ishenbai Kadyrbekov	24 March 2005	25 March 2005

Chairmen of the Supreme Council since 2005. Annual compensation of the chairman is 975 000 soms.

Name	Took office	Left office	Notes
Omurbek Tekebaev	27 March 2005	27 February 2006	
Marat Sultanov	2 March 2006	22 October 2007	
Adahan Madumarov	24 December 2007	29 May 2008	
Aytibay Tagaev	29 May 2008	17 December 2009	
Zaynidin Kurmanov	24 December 2009	6 June 2010	
Ahmatbek Keldibekov	17 December 2010	14 December 2011	
Asilbek Jeenbekov	21 December 2011	13 April 2016	
Chynybai Tursunbekov	27 April 2016	25 October 2017	
Dastan Jumabekov	25 October 2017	6 October 2020	
Myktybek Abdyldayev	6 October 2020	10 October 2020	
Kanatbek Isaev	13 October 2020	4 November 2020	
Talant Mamytov	4 November 2020	5 October 2022	
Nurlanbek Shakiev	5 October 2022	12 February 2026	
Marlen Mamataliev	12 February 2026	Incumbent	

== Last elections ==
- 2021 Kyrgyz parliamentary election
- 2020 Kyrgyz parliamentary election
- 2015 Kyrgyz parliamentary election
- 2010 Kyrgyz parliamentary election
- 2007 Kyrgyz parliamentary election

=== 2005 parliamentary election ===
The 2005 Kyrgyz parliamentary elections were held in February and March 2005. More than 400 candidates ran for the new 75-member unicameral legislative assembly. There were two rounds of voting held on 27 February and 13 March. Six seats were won by opposition politicians. Most candidates were officially independent. International observers said the elections fell short of international standards for democratic elections in several important areas. Widespread protests over alleged rigging of the election by the government culminated in the Tulip Revolution on 24 March. Revolutionaries overthrew President Askar Akayev.

== See also ==
- List of members of the Supreme Council (Kyrgyzstan), 2015–present
- List of Chairmen of the Supreme Soviet of the KSSR and the Supreme Council of Kyrgyzstan
- List of Chairmen of the Legislative Assembly of Kyrgyzstan
- List of Chairmen of the Assembly of People's Representatives of Kyrgyzstan
- Politics of Kyrgyzstan
- List of legislatures by country
