= Supreme Soviet of the Kirghiz Soviet Socialist Republic =

Supreme Soviet of the Kirghiz SSR Верховный Совет Киргизской ССР (Russian) Кыргыз ССРинин Жогорку Совети (Kyrgyz)
- Kirghiz SSR (1937–1991); Kyrgyzstan (1991–1994)
- Coat of arms of the Kirghiz Soviet Socialist Republic

Type
- Type: Supreme Soviet

History
- Established: 1938
- Disbanded: 1994
- Succeeded by: Supreme Council

Elections
- Last election: 1990

Meeting place
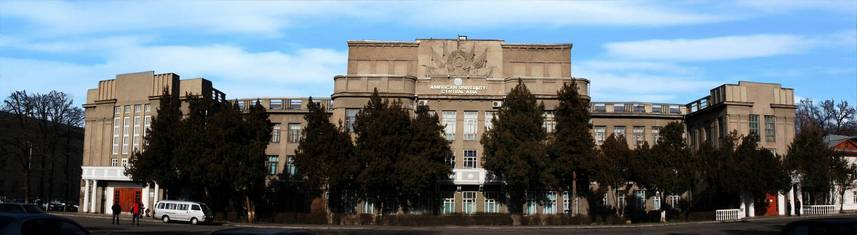
- Government House, Frunze

The Supreme Soviet of the Kirghiz SSR was the highest organ of state authority of the Kirghiz Soviet Socialist Republic.

== Convocations ==
- 1st convocation (1938–1946)
- 2nd convocation (1946–1950)
- 3rd convocation (1950–1954)
- 4th convocation (1954–1958)
- 5th convocation (1958–1962)
- 6th convocation (1962–1966)
- 7th convocation (1966–1971)
- 8th convocation (1971–1975)
- 9th convocation (1975–1979)
- 10th convocation (1979–1984)
- 11th convocation (1984–1989)
- 12th convocation (1989–1993)

== Leaders ==
=== Chairmen of the Presidium of the Supreme Soviet ===
The office of Chairmen of the Presidium of the Supreme Soviet functioned as the executive head of state of the Republic.

- Asanali Tolubaev (July 19, 1938 – March 22, 1943)
- Moldogazy Tokobayev (March 22, 1943 – November 14, 1945)
- Turabay Kulatov (November 14, 1945 – August 25, 1978)
- Sultan Ibraimov (August 25, 1978 – December 22, 1978)
- Andrei Buss (December 22, 1978 – January 10, 1979)
- Arstanbek Duisheev (January 10, 1979 – January 14, 1981)
- Temirbek Koshoev (January 14, 1981 – August 8, 1987)
- Tashtanbek Akmatov (August 8, 1987 – April 10, 1990)

== Notable members ==
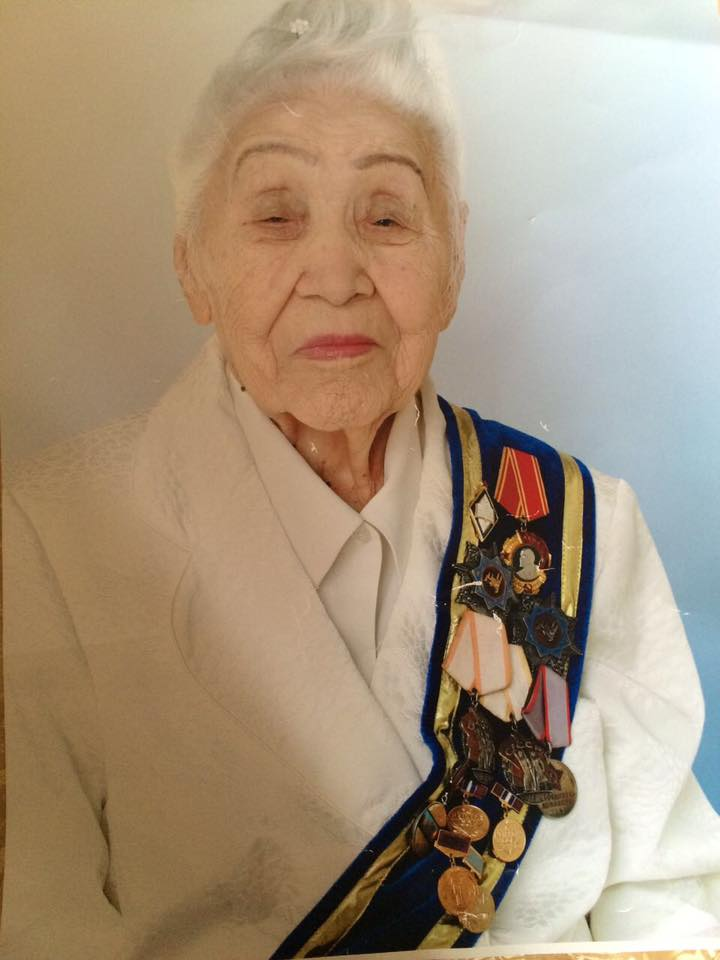
Kakish Ryskulova

Notable members included:

- Myktybek Abdyldayev, former Prosecutor General of Kyrgyzstan
- Askar Akayev, President of Kyrgyzstan
- Anvar Artykov, former Governor of Osh Region
- Apas Jumagulov, President of the Council of Ministers of Kirghiz SSR
- Absamat Masaliyev, First Secretary of the Central Committee of the Communist Party of Kirghizia
- Kakish Ryskulova, first woman surgeon in Kyrgyzstan
