= William R. Gill =

American diplomat

William R. Gill, a career member of the US Foreign Service, was named Deputy Chief of Mission (DCM) in Azerbaijan in 2016. He has since been named US Chargé d'Affaires, a.i.

== Education ==
Gill majored in history at the College of William & Mary.

== Career ==
Gill joined the Foreign Service in 1995. He served as U.S. Consul in Milan, Italy (2007 to 2011) and Beirut, Lebanon (2005 to 2007). While in Lebanon, he coordinated the evacuation of 15,000 Americans during the July-August 2006 war.
