= Matthew Bryza =

American diplomat (born 1964)

Matthew James Bryza
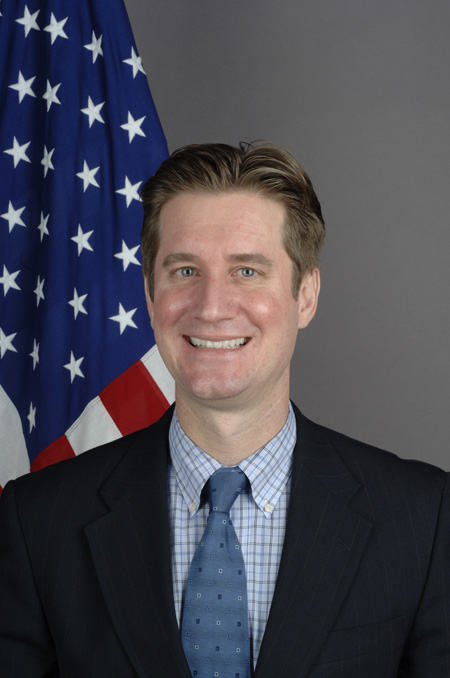

United States Ambassador to Azerbaijan
- In office February 17, 2011 – January 3, 2012
- President: Barack Obama
- Preceded by: Anne E. Derse
- Succeeded by: Richard L. Morningstar

Personal details
- Born: February 16, 1964 (age 62)
- Spouse: Zeyno Baran
- Education: The Fletcher School of Law and Diplomacy, Tufts University (MALD); Stanford University (B.A.)
- Awards: Fletcher Young Alumni Award (2004); Order of the Golden Fleece, Georgia (2009); Order of the Cross of Terra Mariana, Fourth Class, Republic of Estonia (2010)

Matthew James Bryza (born February 16, 1964) is a former United States diplomat. His last post in the United States foreign service was the United States Ambassador to Azerbaijan.

== Education ==
Bryza graduated from Stanford University with a Bachelor of Arts degree in International relations and obtained his Master of Arts in Law and Diplomacy from The Fletcher School of Law and Diplomacy of Tufts University in 1988.

== Career ==
=== Beginning of the foreign service ===
Bryza joined the United States Foreign Service in August 1988. He then served in Poland in 1989-1991 at the U.S. Consulate in Poznań and the U.S. Embassy in Warsaw, where he covered the Solidarity movement, reform of Poland’s security services, and regional politics. From 1991 through 1995, he worked on European and Russian affairs at the State Department. Bryza served at the U.S. Embassy in Moscow during 1995-1997, first as special assistant to Ambassador Thomas R. Pickering and then as a political officer covering the Russian Duma, Communist Party of the Russian Federation, and the Republic of Dagestan in the North Caucasus.

Following a traffic incident in Moscow in which his car hit a pedestrian, he was recalled temporarily by the US State Department, which subsequently received an official communication from the Ministry of Foreign Affairs of the Russian Federation that fully exonerated Bryza. No request was received from the Russian government for a waiver of Bryza’s diplomatic immunity, and James P. Rubin, the department spokesman at the time, was stated to have said that "initial reports indicated that Bryza wasn’t at fault, but the issue has become more complicated". From 1997 through 1998, Bryza was special advisor to Ambassador Richard Morningstar, coordinating U.S. Government assistance programs on economic reforms in Caucasus and Central Asia. Starting from July 1998, he served as the Deputy Special Advisor to the President and Secretary of State on Caspian Basin Energy Diplomacy, coordinating the U.S. Government's inter-agency efforts to develop a network of oil and gas pipelines in the Caspian region.

=== European and Eurasian Affairs ===
In April 2001, Bryza joined the staff of the United States National Security Council as Director for Europe and Eurasia, with responsibility for coordinating U.S. policy on Turkey, Greece, Cyprus, the Caucasus, Central Asia, and Caspian energy. In June 2005, he assumed duties of Deputy Assistant Secretary of State for European and Eurasian Affairs. He was responsible for policy oversight and management of relations with countries in the Caucasus and Southern Europe. He also led U.S. efforts to advance peaceful settlements of separatist conflicts of Nagorno-Karabakh, Abkhazia and South Ossetia. Additionally, he coordinated U.S. energy policy in the regions surrounding the Black and Caspian Seas and worked with European countries on issues of tolerance, social integration, and Islam.

According to leaked diplomatic cables, Bryza had warned Georgian Interior Minister Vano Merabishvili in May that war would be a bad option for Georgia.

In August 2009, Armenian National Committee of America (ANCA) Chairman Ken Hachikian sent a letter to Secretary of State Hillary Clinton outlining the concerns of the Armenian American community regarding what he called the recent "biased remarks by Matt Bryza" the U.S. Co-Chair to the OSCE Minsk Group charged with helping to negotiate a settlement of the Nagorno Karabagh conflict.

=== Controversy Surrounding Recess Appointment as Ambassador to Azerbaijan ===
In May 2010, the White House appointed Bryza as the United States Ambassador to Azerbaijan. His nomination ultimately was never confirmed by the full Senate, however, and after serving as Ambassador for less than a year, Bryza left the State Department and joined the Azerbaijani government-affiliated Turcas petrol board.

On September 21, 2010, the Senate Foreign Relations Committee approved his ambassadorial nomination and sent it to the Senate floor which never approved the nomination. Having failed to receive Senate confirmation for the nomination because of concerns raised by numerous Senators, including Democratic Senators Robert Menendez of New Jersey and Barbara Boxer of California who are Armenian Caucus members, on December 29, 2010, President Obama issued a recess appointment. This recess appointment allowed Bryza to serve as a temporary ambassador. He presented his credentials as ambassador to Azerbaijan on February 17, 2011, and served less than a year until January 3, 2012, when the recess appointment expired.

His nomination was opposed by Armenian-American lobbying groups, as well as the human rights group Reporters Without Borders. Armenian Americans raised conflict of interest concerns including reports that the then Azerbaijani Foreign Minister served as 1 of 3 groomsmen in Bryza's wedding, although Bryza, at the time, was mediating a deadly conflict between Armenia and Azerbaijan in his professional capacity as the U.S. Minsk Group Co Chair. Reporters Without Borders raised concerns about the persecution of Azerbaijani reporters who reported that an Azerbaijani government minister partially paid for Bryza's wedding. According to an article by Ganimat Zahid and Agil Khalil in the Azerbaijani newspaper Azadliq, the then Minister of Economic Development of Azerbaijan, Heydar Babayev, paid for a significant portion of Bryza’s wedding in Istanbul, Turkey. Both Zahid and Khalil were sued over their article and Azadliq correspondent Agil Khalil was the target of four murder attempts and had to flee to France.

Concerns were also raised over Bryza's incomplete responses to Senate inquiries. In response to questions raised during his Senate confirmation process about the potential conflict of interest between his professional work and the Caucasus-related advocacy of his wife, Caspian energy expert Zeyno Baran, Bryza, asserted: “Since January 2009, she has conducted no conferences, briefings, studies or other official work related to the South Caucasus.” However, there were numerous conferences and briefings where Baran spoke or testified on the South Caucasus after January 2009.

Washington Post editor Fred Hiatt, a powerful supporter of Bryza, described his departure as a "vivid example of how the larger U.S. national interest can fall victim to special-interest jockeying and political accommodation". Hiatt criticized Senators for opposing Bryza's nomination. A few months later, Bryza left the State Department to join the Azerbaijani-government affiliated Turcas petrol board.

=== Post foreign service career ===
Bryza works as a consultant on business and democratic development, and is a board member of several private companies in Turkey. Within months of leaving the State Department after the Senate failed to confirm his nomination to be ambassador to Azerbaijan partly because of conflict of interest concerns, Bryza was appointed in June 2012 as a board member of Turcas Petrol, an affiliate of State Oil Company of Azerbaijan Republic (SOCAR), a fully state-owned national oil and gas company headquartered in Baku, Azerbaijan. Bryza is also a board member in NEQSOL holdings, an Azerbaijani energy and communications conglomerate.

Since March 1, 2012, Bryza has been director of the International Centre for Defense Studies, a Tallinn-based think tank. In August 2012, he became a board member of the Jamestown Foundation.

== Awards ==
Bryza was awarded with Fletcher Young Alumni Award in 2004, Order of the Golden Fleece, Georgia in 2009, Order of the Cross of Terra Mariana, Fourth Class, Republic of Estonia in 2010.

== Personal life ==
His first marriage ended in divorce. On August 23, 2007, he married Zeyno Baran, with whom he has a daughter. He lives with his family in Istanbul, Turkey.

Bryza is fluent in Polish and Russian along with German and Spanish, and conversational Azerbaijani.

Diplomatic posts
Preceded by Anne E. Derse	United States Ambassador to Azerbaijan; 2012–2015	Succeeded by Richard Morningstar
