= OSCE Minsk Group =

Azerbaijan-Armenia security pact

- Formation: 24 March 1992; 34 years ago
- Dissolved: 1 September 2025; 14 months ago
- Legal status: Closed
- Purpose: Encourage a peaceful, negotiated resolution of the conflict between Azerbaijan and Armenia over Nagorno-Karabakh
- Members: Permanent members: Armenia; Azerbaijan; Belarus; Germany; Finland; Italy; OSCE Troika (rotating basis); Sweden; Turkey
- Website: www.osce.org/mg

The OSCE Minsk Group was created in 1992 by the Conference on Security and Cooperation in Europe (CSCE), now the Organization for Security and Co-operation in Europe (OSCE), to encourage a peaceful, negotiated resolution to the conflict between Azerbaijan and Armenia over Nagorno-Karabakh.

The OSCE Minsk Group was formally closed on 1 September 2025 by unanimous decision of the OSCE Ministerial Council, following a joint appeal for its dissolution by Armenia and Azerbaijan.

== Founding and members ==
At the Helsinki Additional Meeting of the CSCE Council on 24 March 1992, the Chairman-in-Office was requested to convene, as soon as possible, a conference on Nagorno-Karabakh under the auspices of the CSCE to provide an ongoing forum for negotiations toward a peaceful settlement of the crisis, based on the principles, commitments, and provisions of the CSCE. The conference was to take place in Minsk. The so-called Minsk Group was supposed to spearhead the OSCE’s efforts to find a political solution to the conflict.

On 6 December 1994, the Budapest Summit of Heads of State or Government decided to establish a co-chairmanship for the process. The Summit participants also expressed their political will to deploy multinational peacekeeping forces as an essential part of the overall settlement of the conflict.

Implementing the Budapest decision, Hungarian Chairman-in-Office Marton Krasznai issued the mandate for the Co-Chairmen of the Minsk Process on 23 March 1995.

The main objectives of the Minsk Process were as follows:

- Providing an appropriate framework for conflict resolution in the way of assuring the negotiation process supported by the Minsk Group;
- Obtaining a conclusion by the Parties of an agreement on the cessation of the armed conflict in order to permit the convening of the Minsk Conference;
- Promoting the peace process by deploying OSCE multinational peacekeeping forces.

The Minsk Group was headed by a co-chairmanship consisting of France, Russia and the United States. Furthermore, the Minsk Group also included the following participating states: Belarus, Finland, Germany, Italy, Sweden, Turkey as well as Armenia and Azerbaijan. The OSCE Troika also participated as a permanent member on a rotating basis.

The Minsk Conference on Nagorno-Karabakh was to be attended by the Minsk Group member states and was to be chaired by the co-chairs of the Minsk Group.

== Activities ==
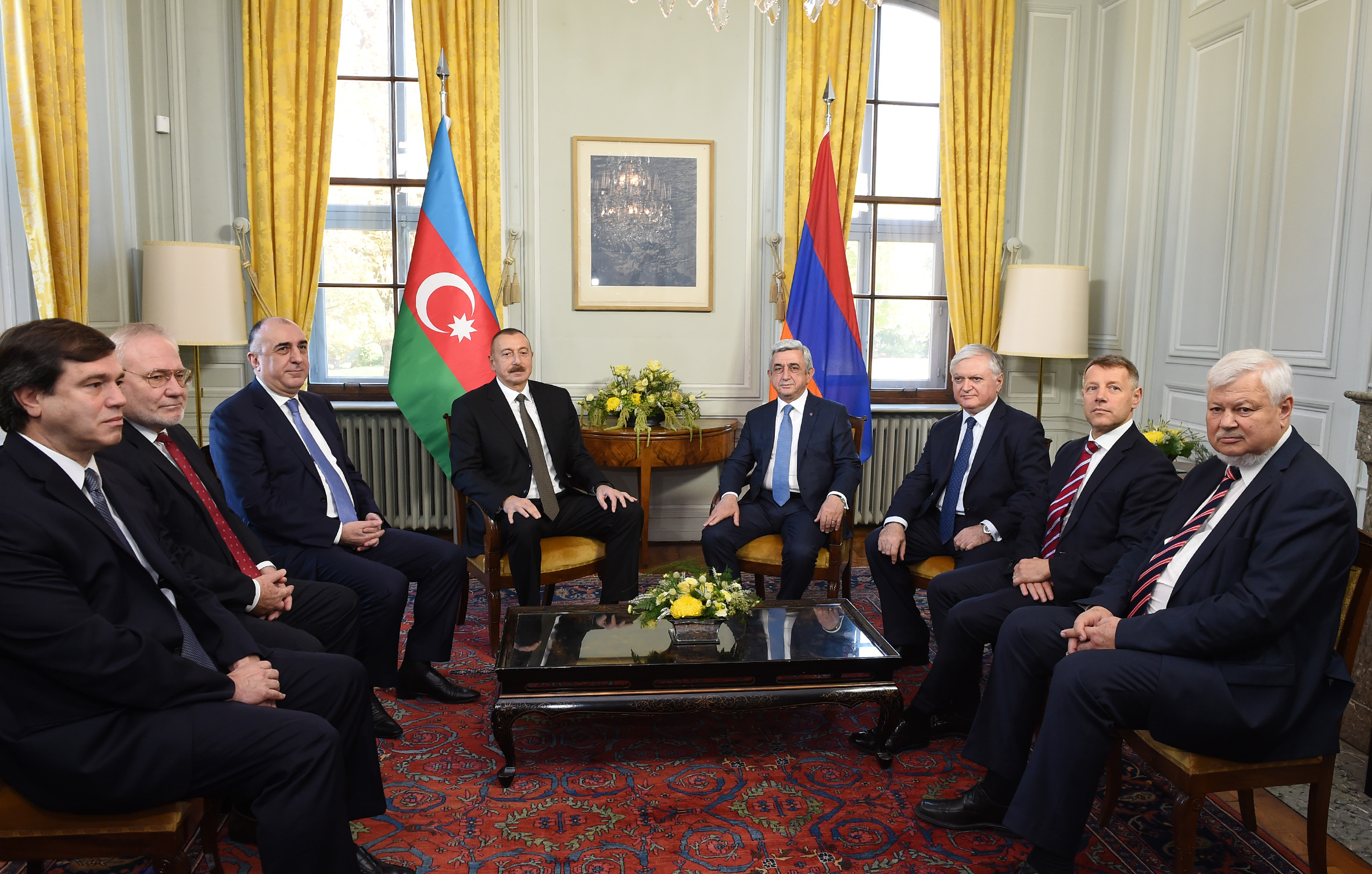
Meeting between Azerbaijani President Ilham Aliyev and Armenian President Serzh Sargsyan in Geneva in 2017

In early 2001, representatives of Armenia, Azerbaijan, France, Russia and the United States met in Paris and in Key West, Florida. The talks in Key West, however, were largely kept secret and were not followed upon.

On 7 October 2002, at the CIS summit in Chișinău, the Armenian and Azerbaijani delegations criticized the Minsk Group’s ten years of ineffective mediation.

On 19 December 2015, Armenian President Serzh Sargsyan and Azerbaijani President Ilham Aliyev held a summit in Bern, Switzerland under the auspices of the Co-Chairs. The Presidents supported ongoing work to reduce the risk of violence and confirmed their readiness to continue engagement on a settlement. The last summit between Ilham Aliyev and Serzh Sargsyan, organized by Minsk Group, took place on 16 October 2017 in Geneva, Switzerland. The presidents agreed to take appropriate actions in order to reinforce the negotiations process and decrease tensions on the Line of Contact.

== After the 2020 Nagorno-Karabakh war ==
After the 2020 Nagorno-Karabakh war, the Azerbaijani government took a position that the OSCE Minsk Group should no longer be dealing with the Nagorno-Karabakh conflict, as "it has been resolved". Ilham Aliyev, in his interview with the local media on 12 January 2022, said that after 30 years of experience, the Minsk Group co-chairs "are on the verge of retirement" and therefore "he wishes them good health and a long life". The format where Russia, the US, and France worked as a team for a long period stalled due to geopolitical confrontation between Russia and the West. Russian Foreign minister Sergey Lavrov on 8 April 2022 said "Our so-called French and American partners in this group, in a Russophobic frenzy and in an effort to cancel everything related to the Russian Federation, said that they would not communicate with us in this format." This, however, did not create a peacekeeping vacuum, as European Union has intensified its efforts to provide reconciliation between Armenia with Azerbaijan. In April 2022, the Russian, French and American co-chairs of the OSCE Minsk Group visited Armenia. Karen Donfried, the US Assistant Secretary of State for European and Eurasian Affairs, said on 20 June 2022 that even if Azerbaijan does not support OSCE Minsk group process, the United States and France will continue participating in it, and that will include cooperation with Russia. Sergei Lavrov stated during his visit to Azerbaijan on 24 June 2022 that the OSCE Minsk Group ceased its activities at the initiative of the U.S. and France. Azerbaijan's foreign minister Jeyhun Bayramov also noted that interaction between the co-chairs of the OSCE Minsk Group has been completely paralyzed and that the peace process cannot be held hostage to and be guided by a non-existent format. Ilham Aliyev declared during a state-sponsored press conference in Shusha on 21 July 2023, that Azerbaijan will never accept any revival of the OSCE Minsk Group, saying that "We don't have very good memories of their actions" and that steps to revive the Minsk Group negotiating format are practically impossible, likening the format to a "broken vase". After the Azerbaijani offensive in Nagorno-Karabakh on 19–20 September 2023, which led to the dissolution of the de facto Republic of Artsakh, Aliyev called for officially abolishing the OSCE Minsk Group and a number of other OSCE mechanisms on 16 February 2024.

== Proposed candidates for co-chairmanship ==
In 2015, Azay Guliyev, an Azerbaijani MP, proposed including Turkey and Germany to the co-chairmanship, whereas Azerbaijani foreign affairs expert Rusif Huseynov proposed Kazakhstan as an additional co-chair in the Minsk Group as a "big actor in the post-Soviet area with population culturally similar to the Azerbaijanis, but a member of several Kremlin-led organizations together with Armenia" with previous experience in the Nagorno-Karabakh conflict.

According to Matthew Bryza, former U.S. Ambassador to Azerbaijan, the EU would make more sense as a co-chair, because it would represent more of Europe and has experience mediating similar conflicts in the Balkans.

Thomas de Waal, a senior fellow at Carnegie Europe, suggested that France leave its co-chair position in favour of another European country with "more balanced relations with Armenia and Azerbaijan", such as Germany or Sweden, or an EU-wide position.

== Criticism ==
=== International ===
Former US co-chair of the Minsk Group Richard E. Hoagland, reflecting on his work with the Minsk Group, wrote that "very, very little ever got accomplished" by the group. He suggested that the Minsk Group redefine its mission, e.g. by enabling reconstruction to its approved mandate, otherwise it may continue as "an intriguing backwater of international diplomacy". According to Carey Cavanaugh, another former US co-chair of the Minsk Group, the organization's consensus-based decision-making process and its rotating leadership rendered it "structurally flawed" to act as a peacemaker, and the United Nations would have been a better option to facilitate peace.

For analyst Laurence Broers, the Minsk Group's future remains unclear, with its failure caused by factors like the normative ambiguity of its attempts to balance the countervailing principles of self-determination and territorial integrity; its secretive, narrow and top-down modus operandi; and its default to performative over substantive diplomacy since 2011, when occasional summits in far-away capitals with little or no interaction in between made the peace process alien to Armenian and Azerbaijani societies. Broers considers the Minsk Group to be "an artifact of the post-Cold War unipolar world" in the settings of a growing multipolar world.

=== In Azerbaijan ===
In Azerbaijan, the OSCE Minsk Group is unpopular due to the presence of large Armenian diasporas in its three co-chair countries and the strategic alliance between Russia and Armenia, which has raised questions about the group’s impartiality. Criticism of the group’s inefficiency began during Heydar Aliyev’s era and continued under his son and successor, Ilham Aliyev.

During the 2020 Nagorno-Karabakh War, France received particularly harsh criticism in Azerbaijan, to the point of being viewed as "unworthy" to hold the position of the OSCE Minsk Group co-chair. After the French senate passed a resolution calling for recognition of independence of Nagorno-Karabakh, Azerbaijan's parliament passed a resolution calling for France to be expelled from the Minsk Group.

On 12 January 2022, Azerbaijan's leader Ilham Aliyev stated that Azerbaijan would prevent the attempts of the OSCE Minsk Group to deal with the Karabakh issue, as he considered it to be "resolved". He pointed at "the lack of unity among the co-chairs, and the absence of an agenda agreed between them", and approval of that agenda by Azerbaijan and Armenia.

== Dissolution ==
On 8 August 2025, Armenia and Azerbaijan, with the mediation of US President Donald Trump, initialed the agreed text for a future Agreement on Establishment of Peace and Inter-State relations, committing to complete and ratify a full peace accord. They also jointly appealed for the OSCE to dissolve the Minsk Group and its related structures. The OSCE welcomed the August 8 Joint Declaration and stated that it stood ready to fulfill its task in implementing the agreement. France supported the call for the dissolution of the OSCE Minsk Group structures. Russia’s Permanent Representative to the OSCE, Alexander Lukashevich, stated that his country supports the joint decision of Armenia and Azerbaijan to dissolve the OSCE Minsk Group, which was scheduled to be fully disbanded by December 2025.

On 1 September 2025, the OSCE Ministerial Council adopted a decision to close the Minsk Process and its related structures. The decision was adopted by consensus among all 57 OSCE participating States. Following the decision, the OSCE proceeded with closing the Minsk Process and its related structures, and administrative tasks such as the transfer of assets and equipment continued until their completion. On 1 December 2025, the OSCE reported the completion of the closure of the Minsk Process and its related structures.

== See also ==
- Armenia–OSCE relations
- Azerbaijan–OSCE relations
- Madrid Principles
- Minsk Protocol, OSCE document on war in eastern Ukraine
- OSCE assessment mission to Armenia
- Prague Process (Armenian–Azerbaijani negotiations)
