= Əhmədli =

Əhmədli (Ahmedli) may refer to:

== Places in Azerbaijan ==
- Əhmədli, Baku
  - Ahmedli (Baku Metro), a railway station
- Əhmədli, Beylagan
- Əhmədli (40° 28' N 46° 09' E), Dashkasan
- Əhmədli (40° 31' N 45° 54' E), Dashkasan
- Əhmədli, Lachin
- Əhmədli, Masally
- Əhmədli, Shamakhi
- Əhmədli, Shamkir

== Other uses ==
- Ahmedli (ship), earlier Empire Teguda, a Polish-built Soviet coastal tanker 1990–2002
