= Xələc =

Xələc or Khalandzh or Khaladzh may refer to:

- Khalaj, Armenia
- Əhmədli, Beylagan, Azerbaijan
- Parça Xələc, Azerbaijan
- Xələc, Khizi, Azerbaijan
- Xələc, Nakhchivan, Azerbaijan
- Xələc, Qubadli, Azerbaijan
- Xələc, Salyan, Azerbaijan
- Xələc, Ujar, Azerbaijan
