= Wars in the Caucasus =

1988–1996 conflicts in the Caucasus

- Part of the post–Cold War era, the Revolutions of 1989, the Russo-Caucasian conflict, and the dissolution of the Soviet Union
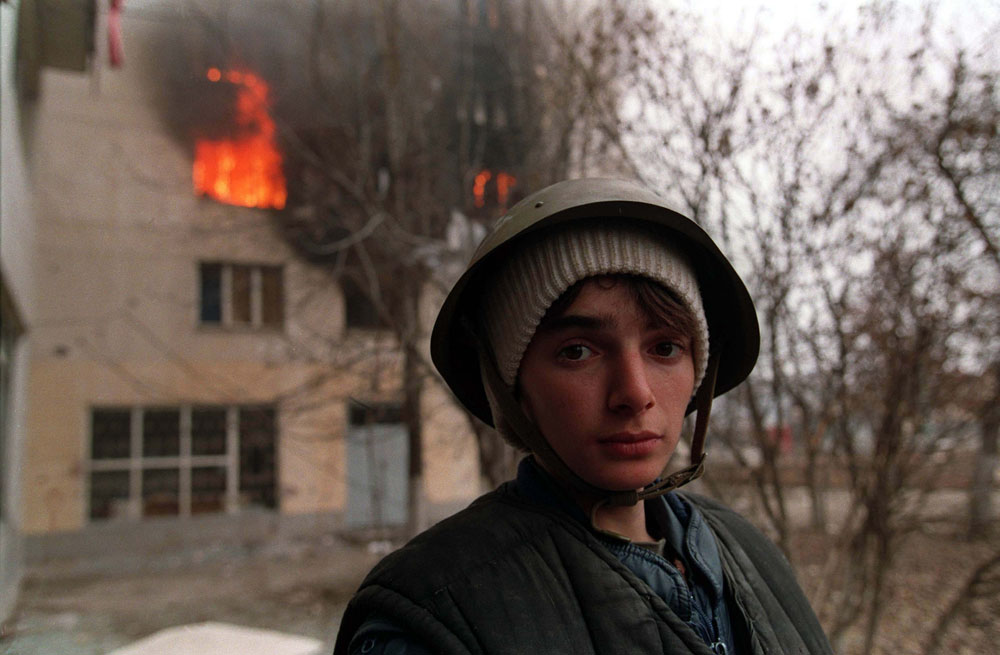
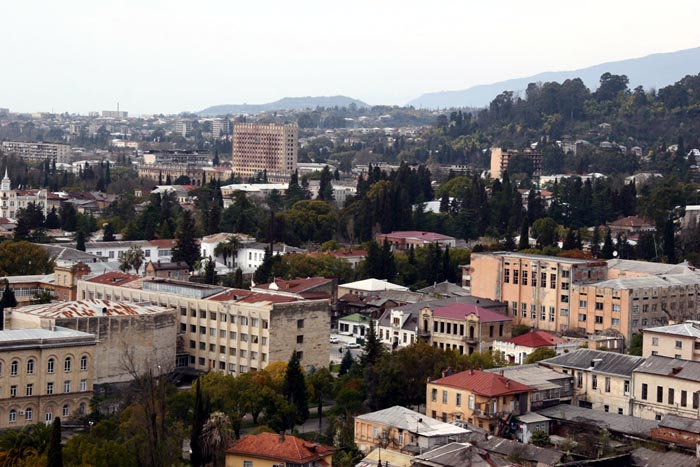
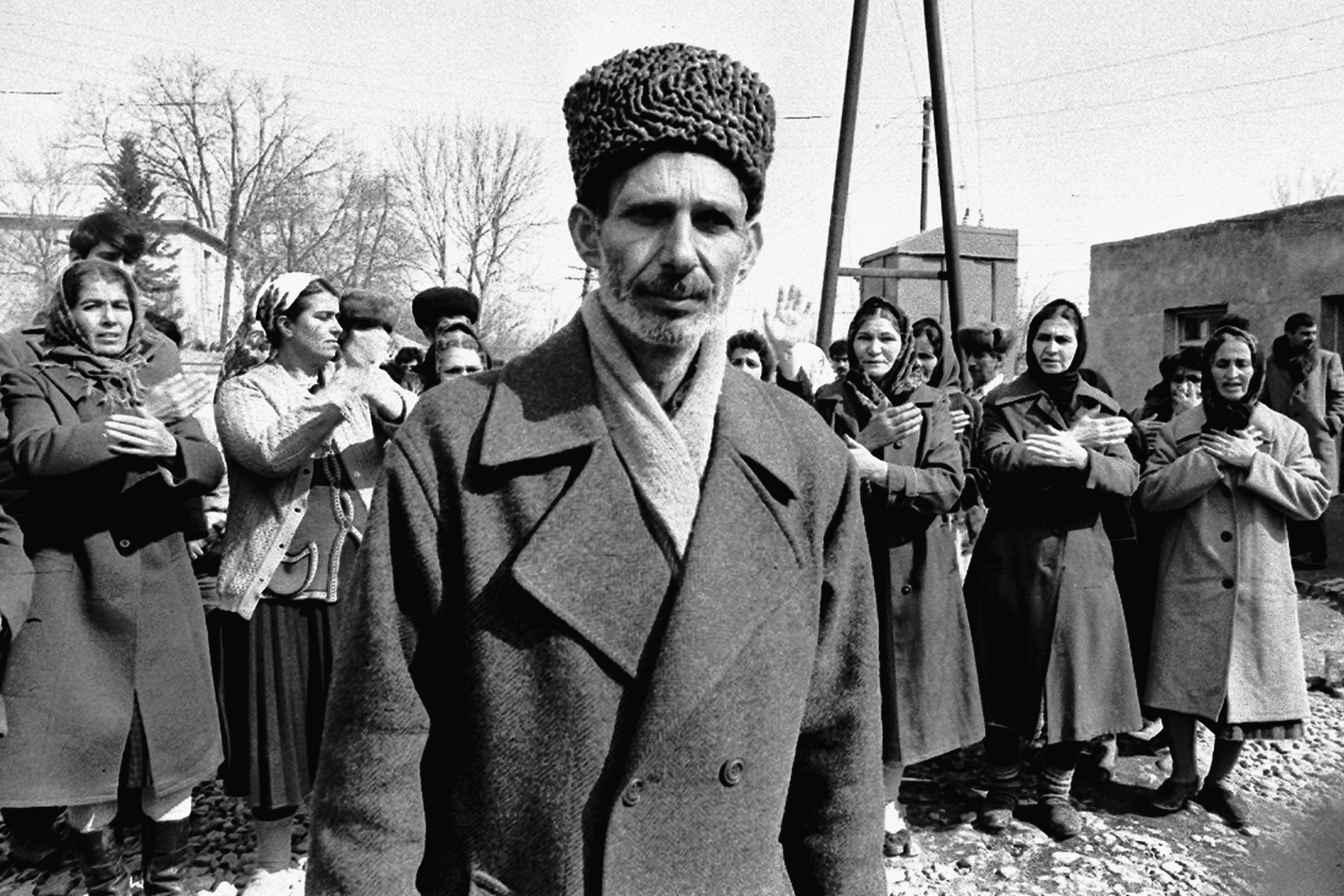
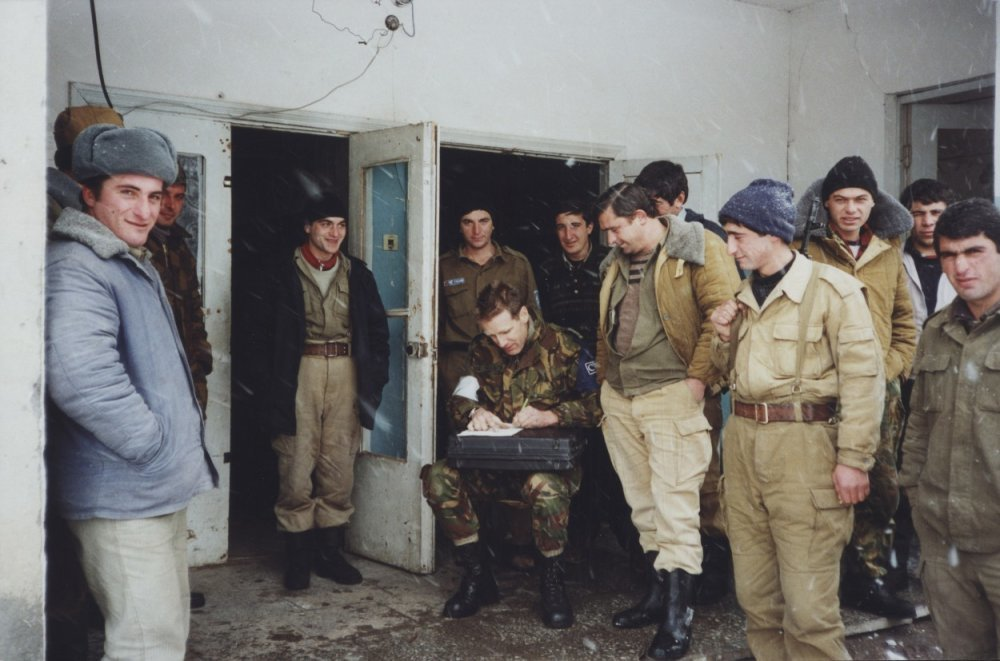
- Clockwise from top: A Chechen child soldier stands in front of a burning house; a mourning ceremony for victims of the Khojaly massacre at Agdam Mosque; Dutch Organization for Security and Co-operation in Europe monitors inspecting a Georgian military installation near the South Ossetian line of contact; Zviadist soldiers hiding from gunfire behind the Georgian Parliament Building; destruction in the Abkhaz capital of Sukhumi following the War in Abkhazia, 2006
Date	20 February 1988 – 31 August 1996 (Note: Other end dates as early as 1994 (6 years) or as late as 2008 (20 years) also sometimes given.) (8 years, 6 months, 1 week and 4 days) First Nagorno-Karabakh War: 20 February 1988 – 12 May 1994 (6 years, 2 months, 3 weeks and 1 day); South Ossetia war (1991–1992): 5 January 1991 – 24 June 1992 (1 year, 5 months, 2 weeks and 5 days); Georgian Civil War: 22 December 1991 – 31 December 1993 (2 years, 1 week and 2 days); War in Abkhazia (1992–1993): 14 August 1992 – 30 September 1993 (1 year, 1 month, 2 weeks and 2 days); East Prigorodny conflict: 30 October – 6 November 1992 (1 week); First Chechen War: 11 December 1994 – 31 August 1996 (1 year, 8 months, 2 weeks and 6 days) Sometimes included: 1998 Gali clashes: 18 – 26 May 1998 (1 week and 1 day); War in Dagestan: 7 August – 14 September 1999 (1 month and 1 week); Second Chechen War: 7 August 1999 – 30 April 2000 (8 months, 3 weeks and 2 days)
Location	Armenia, Azerbaijan, Georgia, Russia (Chechnya, Ingushetia, North Ossetia–Alania) (Note: Russian republic of Dagestan also sometimes included.)
Result	Multiple unrecognised states achieve de facto independence from Georgia, Azerbaijan and Russia
- Total deaths: c. 102,000–231,000+ Displaced: c. 1,500,000–2,000,000

The Wars in the Caucasus were a series of interrelated ethnic and political conflicts which engulfed the Caucasus in the period shortly before and after the dissolution of the Soviet Union. The conflicts, resulting from centuries of ethnic tensions, reached a boiling point as the former republics of the Soviet Union began to seek independence in the late 1980s and early 1990s. Exacerbated by ethnic nationalist claims, they led to the establishment of several de facto independent states, violent government change and a refugee crisis that led to the displacement of 1.5–2 million people.

Colonised by Russia during the 19th century, the Caucasus experienced significant unrest from 1917 to 1923, during the Russian Civil War. During World War II, several ethnic groups were expelled to Central Asia and Siberia by the Soviet government, and the land was subsequently settled by other peoples. After expellees returned to the Caucasus during the Khrushchev Thaw, they found that their homes were now occupied and that the Soviet government was continuing attempts to eradicate their cultures. Throughout the 1960s and 1970s, dissent against the Soviet Union emerged in the North Caucasus, Georgia and Armenia. Between 1985 and 1989, this grew into a low-level uprising, as perestroika and glasnost led to increasingly-open dissent. Amidst the Soviet Union's dissolution, armed militants began engaging one another in combat.

The Wars in the Caucasus have at times been described as a series of decolonisation wars, ethnic conflicts or wars against Russian neocolonialism in the region. The Russian military was actively involved in all of the region's conflicts, pursuing strategies of securing strategic aims such as natural gas and railways or motorways. Russia intervened against nationalist leaders in Georgia (Zviad Gamsakhurdia), Azerbaijan (Abulfaz Elchibey) and Chechnya (Dzhokhar Dudayev), killing the latter.

The Wars in the Caucasus had a destructive effect on the region, leading to one of the steepest declines in economic output in the world during the 1990s. Numerous war crimes were committed during the war, including acts of ethnic cleansing and, in the case of Chechnya, what is occasionally referred to as genocide. As much as 10% of the population of the Caucasus was displaced by fighting, and organised crime, drug trafficking and Islamic extremism proliferated, leading to the insurgency in the North Caucasus and the growth of the Islamic State.

== Background ==
The Caucasus, located in Eastern Europe and Western Asia, was colonised by the Russian Empire in the early and mid-19th century. The region has long been noted by foreign observers for the frequency of conflict in the region, with Russian observers describing it as "anarchic". A combination of Russian divide and rule tactics (Note: Russian colonial administration designated the Christian Georgians and Armenians as "culturally advanced", in contrast to the "culturally backward" and Muslim Azerbaijanis. Ossetians, who adhered to a mixture of pagan, Islamic and Christian traditions before Russian colonisation, were converted to Christianity and conscripted into the Imperial Russian Army, unlike other North Caucasians.) and poor harvests led to mass migration amidst the First globalisation, which exacerbated conflicts over land use. The Russian Civil War further helped to lay the groundwork for future ethnic conflicts in the Caucasus. This was particularly true in Azerbaijan, as Bolsheviks under the leadership of Stepan Shaumian formed an alliance with the Armenian Revolutionary Federation and subsequently began attacking Azerbaijanis.

The Civil War continued in the Caucasus until 1923, as Ottoman and British military interventions unsuccessfully sought the region's fragmentation. Upon its conclusion, the newly established Soviet Union initially accepted the ethno-religious differences in the Caucasus, declaring several ethnic groups to be formally self-governing. Sharia was initially maintained, as was the Arabic script used to write most languages in the North Caucasus. In the mid-1920s, these freedoms were clamped down upon and the local populace was forced to hand over its weapons to the Soviet government. Fearing a pan-Islamic uprising in the region, the Soviets pursued a process of further delimitation in order to foster sectarian tensions. The most notable of these cases was the formal division of Circassians into three separate ethnic groups (Adyghe, Cherkess and Kabardians) In other cases, multiple ethnicities were placed together under a single administrative unit, as Karachays were with the Cherkess and Balkars with the Kabardians.

Amidst World War II, the Soviets yet again shifted course regarding the Caucasus. Fearing that Muslims in the North Caucasus would defect to Nazi Germany, the government of Joseph Stalin recognised Islam and established a muftiate over the region. This policy, however, was limited in response to the brief German occupation, in which the German military reopened closed mosques, closed collective farms, and promised sovereignty to ethnic groups which collaborated. Once the Soviets regained control of the region, a series of decrees by Stalin from November 1943 to March 1944 led to the forced relocation of the entire Balkar, (Note: Main article: Deportation of the Balkars.) Chechen, Ingush, (Note: Main article: Deportation of the Chechens and Ingush.) and Karachay (Note: Main article: Deportation of the Karachays.) populations to Central Asia and Siberia. The autonomous governments which existed in the region were dissolved and residents' homes were given over to new inhabitants, who were primarily ethnic Russians. Thousands died during the forced migrations, and Neil Melvin wrote in 2007 that they were "one of the darkest periods in the history of the native peoples of the North Caucasus."

A political map of the Caucasus (2008)

A political map of the Caucasus (2025)

Peoples who had been deported from the North Caucasus were permitted to return home in the 1950s, amidst the Khrushchev Thaw, but found their homes occupied by the new settlers. The political, military, religious and economic elites of the region had been completely destroyed by the Soviets and the government began pushing for the adoption of industrial agriculture and Russian educators, seeking to destroy the surviving identities of the returning populations. This was resisted by women, who became responsible for reviving local village traditions that had been lost in the deportations, and, in the Northwest Caucasus, tariqas adhering to Sufism.

Throughout the 1960s and 1970s, nationalism throughout the Caucasus continued to grow in strength. In Armenia and Georgia, Soviet dissidents increasingly came to be recognised by the Soviet government and public as a political force, particularly becoming violently anti-Soviet in Georgia. Georgian nationalism led to protests by Abkhazians, who felt threatened, and the Soviet government instituted affirmative action policies of "Abkhazisation" in the Abkhaz ASSR from 1978. These policies gave more or less opportunities to people based on the ethnicity listed on their internal passport, which could not be changed. Soviet policies led to the formalisation of ethnic divides in Abkhazia, where marriages between Georgians and Abkhazians had previously been common.

Meanwhile, North Caucasian ethnic groups who had lost land during the deportations began to organise, most notably the Ingush at the 1973 Grozny meeting, which demanded the return of formerly-Ingush territory held by the North Ossetian Autonomous Soviet Socialist Republic. Protests by Armenians demanding recognition of the Nagorno-Karabakh Autonomous Oblast (NKAO), which was governed separately from Armenia as part of Azerbaijan, began to intensify, spurred on by centralisation in Azerbaijan that restricted the Autonomous Oblast's rights and encouraged Azerbaijani supremacy over Armenians.

The policies of perestroika and glasnost, initiated by Soviet leader Mikhail Gorbachev in 1985, marked the beginning of low-level conflict between local nationalists and the Soviet government; while a union-wide phenomenon, this was particularly present in the Caucasus. From September 1985 to August 1989 the number of those killed in such clashes was assessed by researcher Astrid S. Tuminez as being in the "low hundreds". This conflict served as a reflection of growing discontent with Soviet rule over non-Russians at the time – in the same period, forty-seven large demonstrations occurred in the Soviet Union, almost entirely in republics that sought secession.

== History ==
=== First Nagorno-Karabakh War ===
Throughout the Soviet period, Azerbaijani authorities implemented policies aimed at suppressing Armenian culture and diluting the Armenian majority in Nagorno-Karabakh through various means, including border manipulations, encouraging the exodus of Armenians, and settling Azerbaijanis in the region. In the 1960s, 1970s, and 1980s, Armenians protested against Azerbaijan's cultural and economic marginalization

Motivated by fears of cultural and physical erasure under government policies from Azerbaijan, Armenians launched a national liberation movement which came to be known as the Karabakh Movement between 1988 and 1991. The movement advocated for the reunification of the Nagorno-Karabakh Autonomous Oblast (NKAO) – an autonomous enclave within Azerbaijan – with Armenia.

A referendum in 1988 was held to transfer the region to Soviet Armenia, citing self-determination laws in the Soviet constitution. (Note: According to the Constitution of the USSR, if a union republic voted to leave the Soviet Union, its autonomous republics, autonomous oblasts, and autonomous okrugs had the right to hold their own referendums to independently decide whether to remain in the USSR or to leave alongside the seceding union republic. They also had the right to raise questions regarding their own state-legal status.) This act was met with a series of pogroms against Armenians across Azerbaijan, and in November 1991, the Azerbaijani government passed a motion aimed at abolishing the autonomy of the NKAO and prohibiting the use of Armenian placenames in the region. As pogroms against Armenians occurred in Baku and Sumgait, Azerbaijanis were expelled from Nagorno-Karabakh. The Nagorno-Karabakh Republic subsequently declared independence via referendum in 1991 and the conflict escalated into the First Nagorno-Karabakh War.

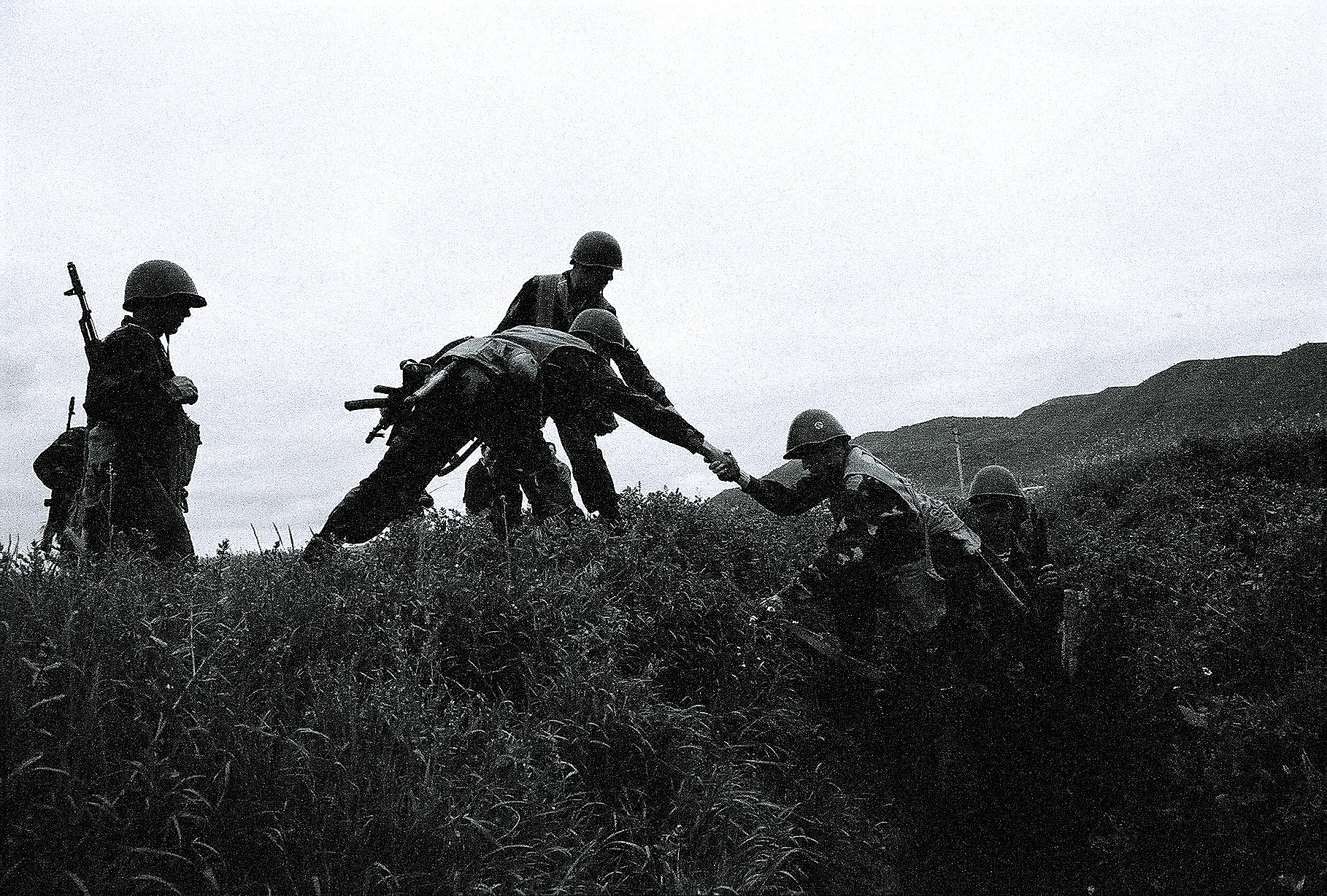
Armenian soldiers during the First Nagorno-Karabakh War

A string of military defeats in early 1992 led to the post-communist Azerbaijani government of Ayaz Mutallibov being overthrown and replaced by Abulfaz Elchibey, a former Soviet dissident. Armenia received direct military support from Russia, which sent the 366th Guards Motor Rifle Regiment to Nagorno-Karabakh. In backing Armenia, Moscow primarily sought to topple Elchibey, a nationalist who sought to increase his country's connections to the Western world. Azerbaijan, on the other hand, was backed by the Afghan Hezb-e Islami, which provided thousands of soldiers to fight Armenia as mercenaries.

Throughout 1993 the United Nations Security Council passed four resolutions (Note: Resolutions 822 (30 April), 853 (29 July), 874 (14 October) and 884 (12 November)) relating to the conflict. The resolutions call for an end to hostilities and withdrawal of occupying forces, the preservation of territorial integrity, and a negotiated peace process – through the OSCE Minsk Group – that guarantees the rights and security of the local Armenian population in Nagorno-Karabakh.

Elchibey was overthrown in a coup d'état by Surat Huseynov (which journalist Thomas de Waal and researcher Murat Gül have claimed was done with the support of Russia), and Heydar Aliyev became president. In 1994, the Organization for Security and Co-operation in Europe established the Minsk Group under the auspices of France, Russia and the United States, with the aim of negotiating a ceasefire. A Russian-backed truce was subsequently approved that May, though Aliyev rejected a plan to station 18,000 Russian peacekeepers in the region. The Nagorno-Kabarakh Republic acquired all of its claimed territories as well as swathes of undisputed land within Azerbaijan.

=== Georgian Civil War, ethnic conflicts in Abkhazia and South Ossetia ===
Ethnic relations between Georgians and Abkhazians began to fall apart in 1989. Increasing Abkhaz demands for further autonomy led to Georgian protests, which were subsequently violently suppressed by the Soviet government. In July, the Abkhaz capital of Sukhumi was rocked by violent civil unrest over Georgian demands for the Georgian branch of the Abkhazian State University to be transformed into a local branch of Tbilisi State University.

In the South Ossetian Autonomous Oblast in northern Georgia, meanwhile, a legal struggle was evolving, as the Georgian and South Ossetian governments began passing contradictory laws. South Ossetia unilaterally declared itself an Autonomous Soviet Socialist Republic on 20 September 1989, a decision that was reversed by the Georgian SSR's government on 10 November. A series of riots in Tskhinvali, South Ossetia's capital, caused casualties and led the Soviet central government to impose a state of emergency in the region. On 12 December 1990, gunmen driving a car in Tskhinvali opened fire from a submachine gun, killing three Georgians and wounding two in what has been described as a terrorist attack and an act of ethnic violence. The Georgian government responded by blockading South Ossetia and eventually declaring the region's autonomy defunct on 11 December 1990. The South Ossetian war began shortly thereafter.

Zviad Gamsakhurdia, a nationalist anti-Soviet dissident, was elected as the first President of Georgia with 87% support after his party Round Table—Free Georgia won the 1990 Georgian Supreme Soviet election. Georgia seceded from the Soviet Union in a March 1991 referendum. After few months, the opposition started to demonstrate against President Gamsakhurdia, accusing him of violating the political pluralism and freedom of the press.

Though Abkhazia had voted in the 1991 referendum to remain as part of the Soviet Union, they initially accepted becoming part of a post-Soviet Georgia, unlike South Ossetia. In return for remaining under Georgia, Abkhazia was allowed to retain its autonomy and permitted an electoral system that disproportionately favoured Abkhazians over Georgians in the People's Assembly of Abkhazia. Meanwhile, fighting continued to escalate in South Ossetia; hundreds of villages were destroyed, 100,000 Ossetians fled to the neighbouring North Ossetian ASSR, within Russia and 23,000 ethnic Georgians fled from South Ossetia.

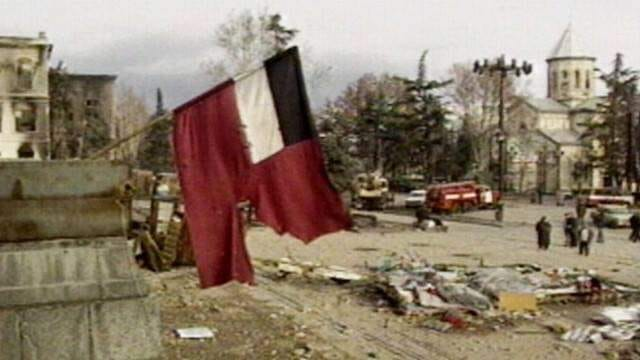
A Georgian flag raised over Rustaveli Avenue in the Georgian capital of Tbilisi following the 1991–1992 Georgian coup d'état

From September to December 1991, protests against Gamsakhurdia's government gradually evolved into street violence between his supporters and opponents. These protests culminated in a January 1992 coup d'état, overseen by members of the former communist nomenklatura, the Georgian mafia and disgruntled former allies of the President. Gamsakhurdia refused to surrender, fleeing to Chechnya, and his native region of Mingrelia (in Georgia's west) rose up in revolt against the new government. After two months of political deadlock, former Soviet leader of Georgia and foreign minister Eduard Shevardnadze was offered the office of President, which he accepted. The Russian military, via the Transcaucasian Military District's headquarters in the Georgian capital of Tbilisi, provided support to the putschists against Gamsakhurdia in retaliation for his nationalist and pro-Western views.

The elections in Abkhazia were held in September 1991, resulting in the legislature with different ethnic factions; 28 seats were reserved for Abkhazians, 26 for Georgians and 11 for the other ethnic groups. As Georgia's political order collapsed, Abkhazia's government issued a request to the putschists to renegotiate the Abkhaz–Georgian relationship in June 1992. Meanwhile, on 24 June 1992 a political crisis erupted in Abkhazia between the Abkhazian and Georgian parliamentary factions: the chairman of the Abkhaz legislature Vladislav Ardzinba ordered the republican guard to attack the building of Abkhazian Ministry of Internal Affairs and remove ethnic Georgian minister Givi Lominadze from office, which led to Lominadze's hospitalization. Lominadze was replaced by Alexander Ankvab, a member of Abkhaz ethno-nationalist movement Aidgylara. After this, on 30 June, Georgian deputies of the Supreme Soviet organized a walk-out. On 23 July, the Abkhazian faction unilaterally readopted the 1925 constitution of the Socialist Soviet Republic of Abkhazia, tantamount to declaring independence, without the presence of the Georgian deputies. Eduard Shevardnadze, the leader of Georgia, condemned the decision, saying that it was taken without consulting the opinion of the majority of population. In August 1992, Shevardnadze's government deployed the Georgian military near and in the region amid the increased presence of the Gamsakhurdia loyalists in those areas. This was treated as a declaration of war by Abkhazia's government, leading to the beginning of the War in Abkhazia.

The dissolution of the Soviet Union and its replacement by the Russian Federation led Russia to further increase support for separatists; North Ossetia threatened not to accede to the Federation via signing the Treaty of Federation unless Russian president Boris Yeltsin provided support for South Ossetia. In late May 1992, North Ossetia closed the natural gas pipeline to Georgia. This led Yeltsin and Shevardnadze to sign the Sochi agreement on 24 June 1992, declaring a ceasefire to be enforced by Russia, Georgia and South Ossetia. Russia also provided support to Abkhazia by supplying them with heavy weapons and securing air supremacy. The Abkhazians were also backed by the Confederation of Mountain Peoples of the Caucasus, a militant political group led by Musa Shanibov that called for the North Caucasus to become independent from Russia.

Despite being weakened by simultaneously fighting both Abkhazia and Gamsakhurdia's supporters, the Georgian government successfully captured Sukhumi in mid-1992. The Abkhaz government under Vladislav Ardzinba's leadership evacuated to Gudauta in the north, while fighting continued along the banks of the Gumista River. In the countryside, ethnic Abkhazians and Armenians formed armed militias against local Georgian populations, who did the same. The Abkhaz government launched an offensive that succeeded in retaking much of Abkhazia, including Sukhumi, though the Kodori Valley was secured by Svan militias. At least 200,000 ethnic Georgians were displaced by the Abkhaz government after their victory as part of a process of ethnic cleansing. A ceasefire agreement was signed on 14 May 1994, with Russian peacekeepers under the flag of the Commonwealth of Independent States enforcing the de facto border.

Following the defeat of the Georgian government in Abkhazia, Gamsakhurdia returned from his Chechen exile to lead another rebellion against Shevardnadze. In order to secure his rule, Shevardnadze turned to Russian military support. He joined the Commonwealth of Independent States and the Collective Security Treaty Organisation, a military alliance led by Russia. Further Russian peacekeepers were also deployed to the region in what academic Stephen Blank describes as part of a strategy of neocolonialism. Gamsakhurdia was later defeated by the Georgian government and Russia, and died under disputed circumstances that were officially ruled a suicide.

=== East Prigorodny conflict ===
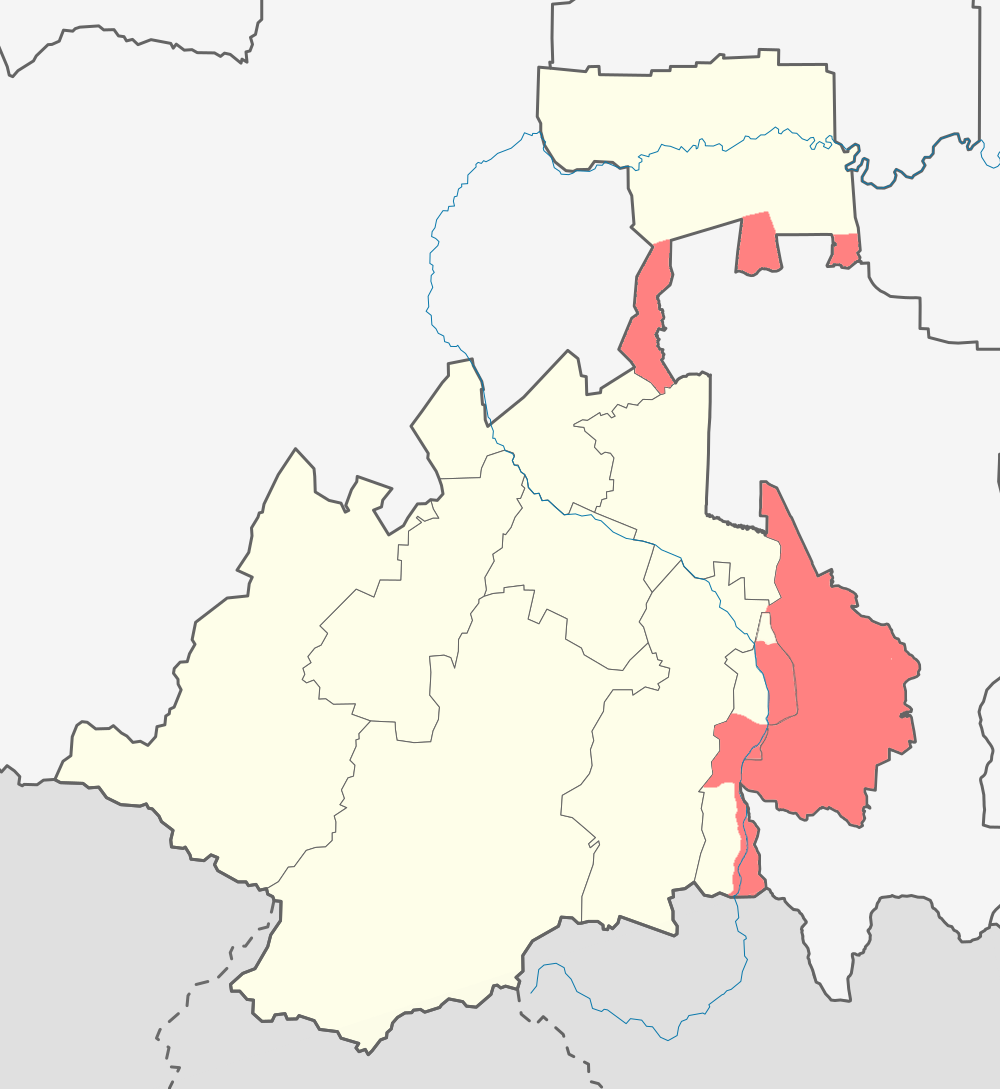
Regions disputed between Ingushetia and North Ossetia in the East Prigorodny conflict

Rather than joining the Chechen Revolution, Ingushetia chose to remain as part of Russia in the hopes that formerly-Ingush parts of Prigorodny District, which had been seized by North Ossetia following the 1944 expulsions would be returned, allowing them to resettle in the region. In 1991, the Soviet government passed the Law on the Rehabilitation of the Repressed Peoples, which allowed for the repatriation of people and the transfer of territory in cases where borders or populations had been exchanged under Stalin's rule. No concepts on managed repatriation were written in the law, and following its passage, a disorganised movement of Ingush people seeking to return to Prigorodny District began, led by Ingush nationalist group Nijsxo. This disturbed North Ossetians and served as the basis for future conflict.

After the collapse of the Soviet Union, local armed groups began to emerge in North Ossetia and Ingushetia. In late 1991 and early 1992, low-level clashes between Ossetians and Ingush continued, further inflamed by the settlement of South Ossetian refugees in Prigorodny District. This culminated in a series of battles on 30 or 31 October between Ingushetia and North Ossetia across the latter's territory. (Note: A total of 12 settlements were attacked: Chermen, Oktyabrskoye, Dachnoye, Kurtat, Kambileyevskoye, Dongaron, Komgaron, Chernorechenskoye, Terk, Redant, Yuzhny and the North Ossetian capital of Vladikavkaz.)

The conflict continued for five days, during which time over 400 Ingush and 200 Ossetians were killed. Fourteen Ingush villages were destroyed by North Ossetian forces, who expelled 40,000 Ingush from the region. The Russian government intervened in the war on 2 November 1992, declaring a state of emergency and the installation of a "Provisional Administration" over both North Ossetia and Ingushetia, which the Russian Armed Forces directed. The military, however, would not arrive until 5 November; in the interim between Yeltsin's decree and the arrival of Russian forces, during which time fighting and casualties continued. An agreement between Ingush president Ruslan Aushev and North Ossetian president Akhsarbek Galazov was negotiated by Yeltsin and signed in 1994, as a result of which Ingushetia surrendered its formal claims over Prigorodny District.

The East Prigorodny conflict was the least bloody of the Wars in the Caucasus. Despite this, it further worsened tensions between Ingush and Ossetians, leading to the Insurgency in Ingushetia in the early 21st century. The Russian military administration, in contrast to Yeltsin's pro-Ingush views, expressed favouritism towards the Ossetians as Orthodox Christians, and sought to use the conflict as a basis to invade the de facto independent Chechen Republic of Ichkeria. During their occupation of North Ossetia and Ingushetia, Russian forces continued pushing east into Chechnya until the Confederation of Mountain Peoples of the Caucasus threatened a regional uprising if Russia did not withdraw.

=== First Chechen War ===
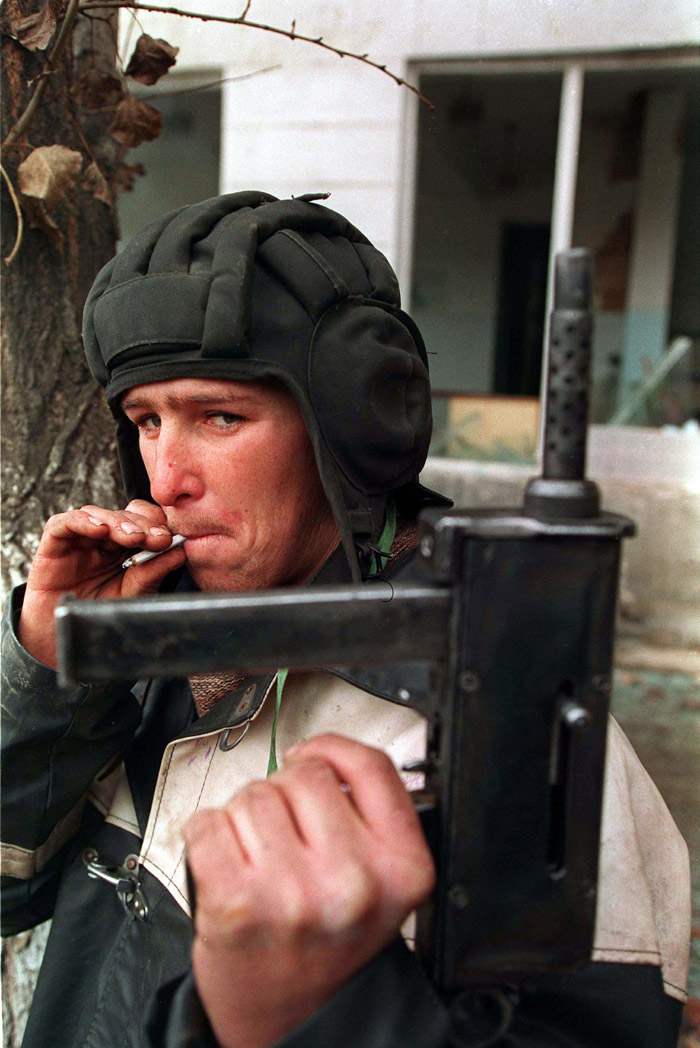
Chechen soldier with a homemade weapon during the First Battle of Grozny, 1995

The Chechen Republic of Ichkeria became independent from the Soviet Union in 1990, though it remained unrecognised by the international community. Unlike other Muslim-majority republics that had significant independence movements from Russia (such as Tatarstan and Bashkortostan), Chechnya's ethnically homogenous nature and large support among local elites for independence led them to refuse accession into the Russian Federation. Russia had a vested strategic interest in securing Chechnya: the separatist region was home to a large natural gas pipeline, as well as a motorway and a railway. The government was also concerned about the possible spread of separatist sentiments to other republics.

Yeltsin made his first military effort to secure control over Chechnya by launching a coup d'état against the government of Chechen leader Dzhokhar Dudayev in November 1994. The coup attempt failed, humiliating the Russian government. On 11 December 1994, Yeltsin sent troops into Chechnya by presidential decree. Russia initially believed that the war would be short. Indeed, Minister of Defence Pavel Grachev claimed that he would secure the Chechen capital of Grozny with two divisions of the Russian Airborne Forces by the new year (1995). This attempt failed dramatically. In the ensuing battle, several Russian brigades were destroyed by the Chechen military. The Russian military pursued a strategy of shock and awe, launching a strategic bombing campaign against most Chechen population centres. As a result of the bombings, tens of thousands of civilians were killed. Most of Chechnya was occupied by Russia within two months of fighting, forcing the government into the southern highlands. Chechen military fatalities remained low during this period, particularly in comparison to their Russian counterparts: within the first fifteen days of the war, 1,000 Chechen soldiers were killed in action compared to 12,000–13,000 Russian soldiers (between 48% and 52% of the initial invasion force).

From the highlands, the Chechen rump state continued to wage a guerrilla war. Russian counter-insurgency tactics relied on inflicting further civilian casualties, with German OSCE monitor Jürgen Heiducoff noting that "thousands of civilians are exterminated in order to kill ten or perhaps fifteen rebels." Following the Budyonnovsk hospital hostage crisis in June 1995, Chechen morale significantly improved as a result of the perceived victory. Russia killed Dudayev in April 1996, but this had little effect on the insurgents' morale or effectiveness. In the August 1996 Third Battle of Grozny, the city was rapidly recaptured by Chechen forces, leading to the signing of the Khasavyurt Accord ceasefire a few weeks later.

== War crimes ==
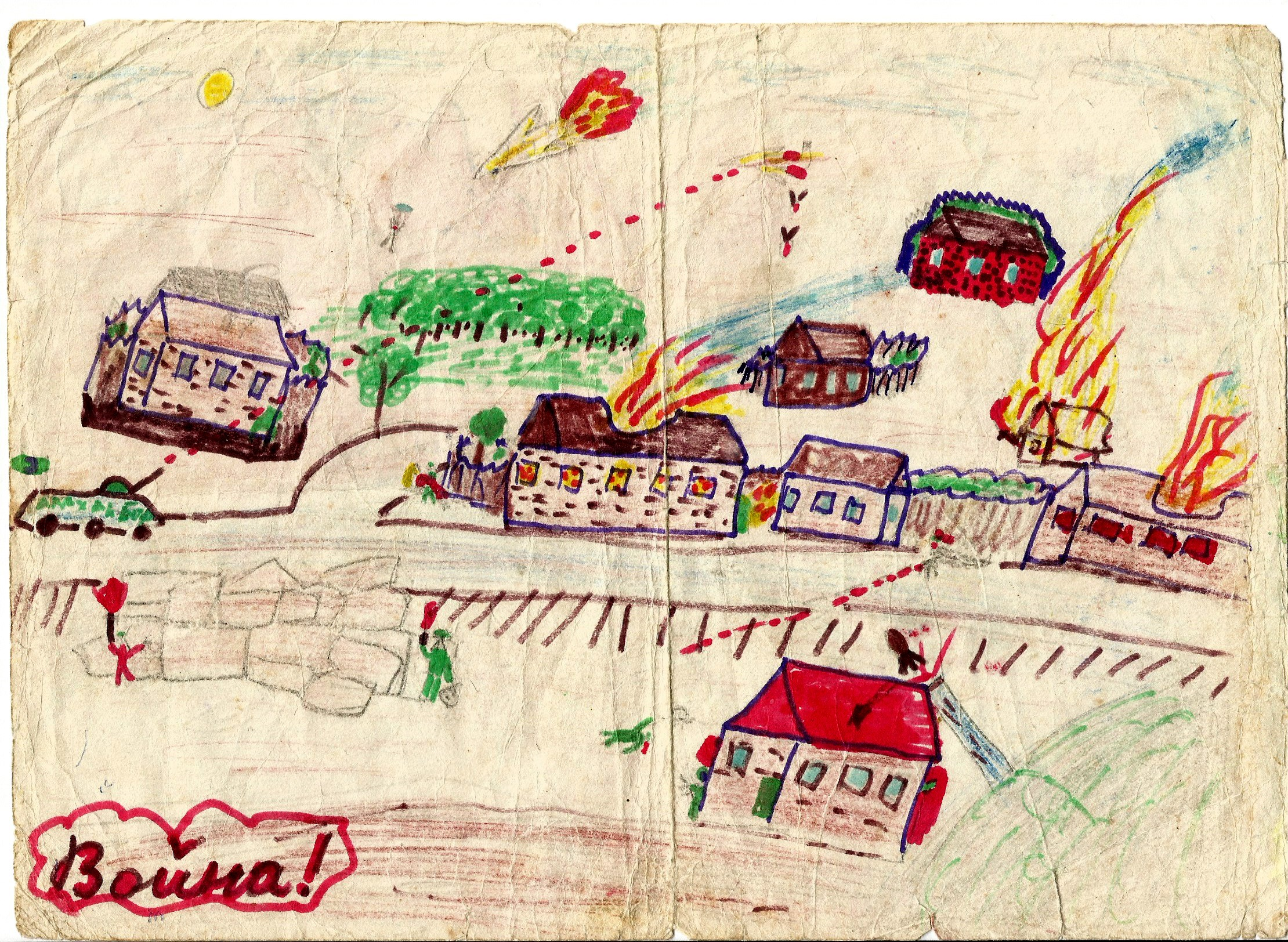
A drawing by Polina Zherebtsova from the First Chechen War

It is commonly agreed by scholars that several instances of war crimes were committed during the Wars in the Caucasus. These crimes include ethnic cleansing, as well as allegations of genocide. In particular, the Russian government role in the First Chechen War was condemned by the International Court of Justice, which attempted to sway United States and Western European governmental policy to be more critical of Russian military actions. Heiducoff, the OSCE monitor, referred to Russian military tactics as an attempt to annihilate the Chechen people; Russian general Sergei Stepashin also was reported as having said "to win this war the whole male Chechen population would have to be eradicated."

The refusal of involved countries, such as Russia, to both sign and ratify the Rome Statute, has been cited by Georgian Ajarian politician Aslan Abashidze and Russian legal theorist Elena Trikoz as being the key obstacle to International Criminal Court proceedings regarding the Wars in the Caucasus. The reasons for this are dependent upon the respective country, but primarily based on issues of criminal justice reforms within the Commonwealth of Independent States and perceived threats to state sovereignty by the ICC's policies. As of 2009, the only nation in the Caucasus to sign and ratify the Rome Statute is Georgia, which did so in the hopes that what its government alleged to be genocide would be investigated in Abkhazia. Armenia has signed the Rome Statute and expressed support for it, but its laws continue to remain incompatible with the statute.

== Aftermath ==
=== Economic effects ===
The Wars in the Caucasus dramatically depressed the local economy of Caucasus states and regions, slowing economic growth and increasing both poverty and corruption. As a result of the economic downturn during the wars, several million left the region in addition to those displaced by fighting, with most leaving to Russia. By 2000 only Azerbaijan had returned to 50% of its 1989 production levels. The economic changes were unprecedented in history, with a rapid decline in conditions from high standards of living to among the lowest in the world. Only Moldova and Tajikistan, both of which also suffered civil wars, experienced similar declines within the former Soviet Union during the same period.

=== Refugee crisis ===
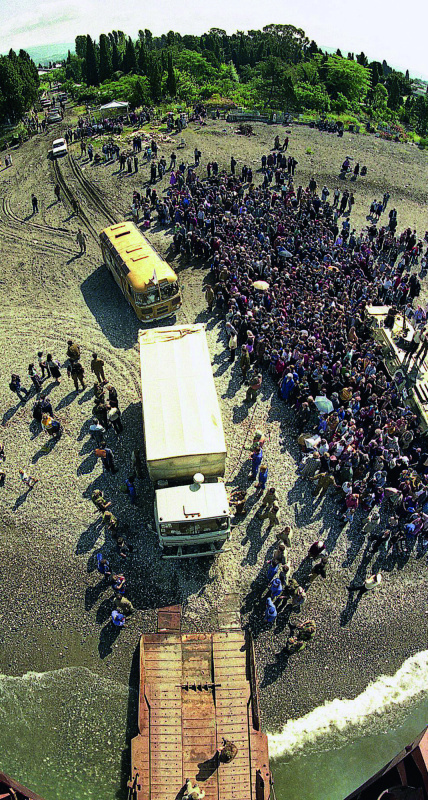
A Russian Ministry of Emergency Situations convoy providing humanitarian aid to Abkhaz IDPs, June 1993

The Wars in the Caucasus had the effect of a massive refugee crisis, ultimately resulting in the flight of 1.5 to as much as or more than two million people, comprising 10% of the South Caucasus population at the time. The majority of these refugees were displaced within Russia or the South Caucasus states, though others fled to other countries, such as European Union member states. Significant groups of the Chechen diaspora now exist in Ukraine, Poland and France, while Kurdish refugees from Georgia and Armenia settled with other parts of the Kurdish diaspora in the European Union and Canada.

The Armed Forces of Ukraine were deployed to the Caucasus to evacuate 250,000 Georgian refugees fleeing Abkhazia in autumn 1993, marking the first overseas deployment of Ukraine's military. United Nations-organised refugee camps were established in Russia after the Wars in the Caucasus. Conditions in these camps were extremely poor, with most residents living in squalor. Refugees also faced problems from the Russian government, which sought to close the camps and relocate refugees to their countries of origin in spite of continued violence. In 2002, Russia was accused by Human Rights Watch of forcibly relocating 20,000 Chechen refugees back to Chechnya, while Ingush inhabitants of East Prigorodny were forced to live in camps within the Republic of Ingushetia.

Iran also established refugee camps in Azerbaijan as part of an effort to prevent the entry of migrants to Iranian Azerbaijan. Iran claimed to have taken in 40,000 refugees from the Wars in the Caucasus by November 1993. In establishing refugee camps within Azerbaijan, Iran was primarily motivated by antipathy towards the Azerbaijani government and popular support for Azerbaijan in the Nagorno-Karabakh War.

=== Organised crime ===
Tied to the refugee crisis was the expansion of organised crime groups, both within and outside their home countries. The Georgian mafia played a significant role in the Georgian Civil War, with bosses such as Tengiz Kitovani and Jaba Ioseliani bringing Shevardnadze into power before later coming into conflict with his government. Following the civil war, a new generation of organised criminals emerged and asserted near-total dominance over the country's economy. In Chechnya, the Chechen mafia were among the leaders of efforts to maintain Chechen independence, providing support for Dudayev in return for members of their government being placed into government positions.

The Chechen mafia also grew outside Chechnya during the Wars in the Caucasus, with two causes; on one hand, the refugee crisis allowed members of the mafia to establish themselves in different areas. On the other hand, Chechen guerrillas turned to the arms and narcotics trade out of desperation during the First Chechen War. Members of the mafia have established themselves among Chechen refugee communities in Georgia and France. A 2002 report by the Library of Congress to the United States government further alleged that the Caucasus had become a transit hub for heroin from the Golden Crescent.

=== Radicalisation and spillover into other countries ===
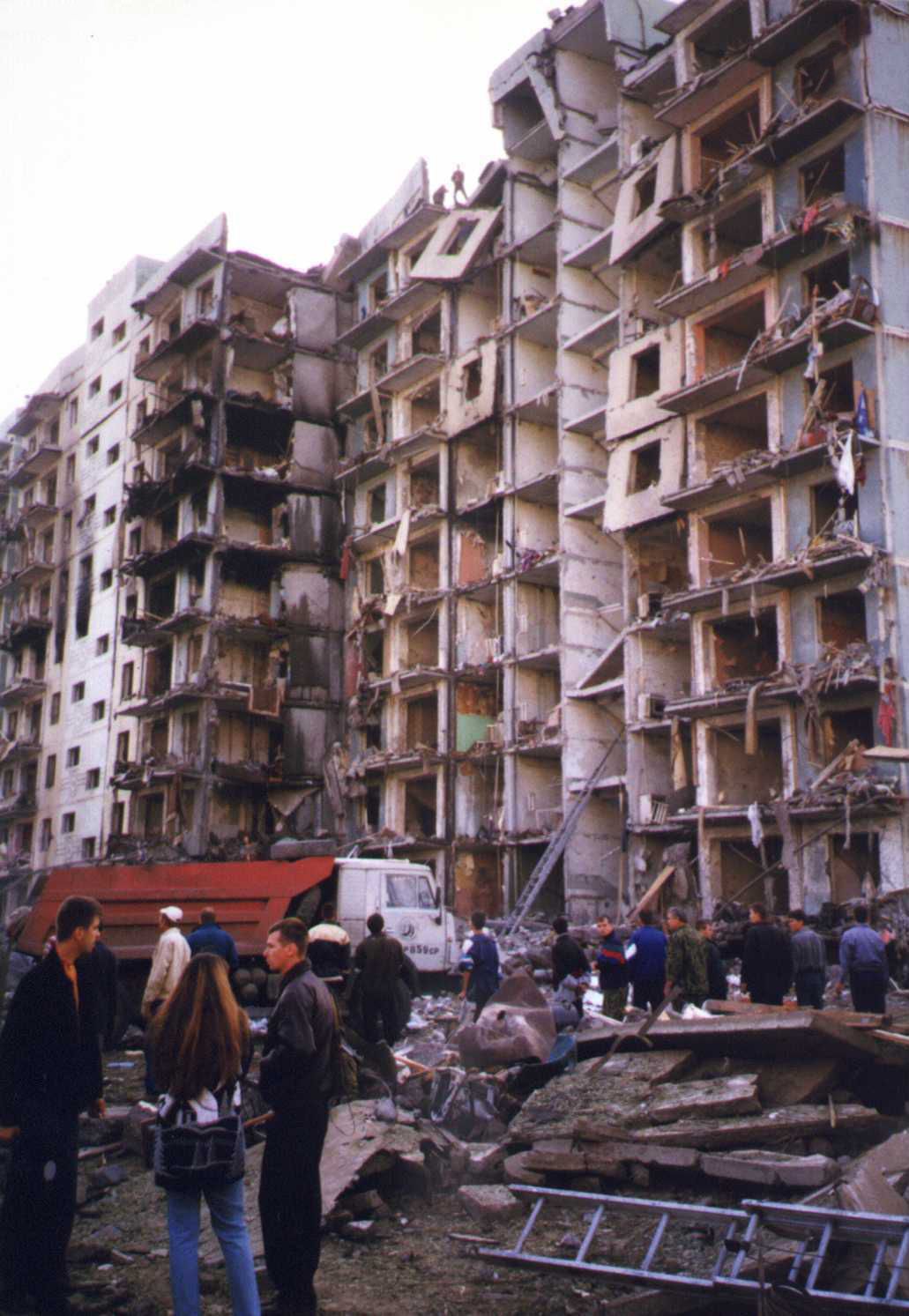
Aftermath of a bombing in Volgodonsk during the 1999 Russian apartment bombings. The extent to which the apartment bombings were genuine terrorist attacks or a false flag by the Russian government is a matter of debate.

The Wars in the Caucasus additionally had the effect of promoting radical nationalism and Islamism on a local level. Particularly in the North Caucasus, Islamism grew in strength following the wars and massive migration to cities. Some of these extremists would later fight as part of the Syrian opposition or Islamic State during the Syrian civil war. Typical depictions of the North Caucasus in Russia since the wars have depicted the region as a centre of Islamism (referred to as Wahhabism by the Russian government), although the general population of the region has rejected the concept. Islamism in the North Caucasus has been used since the war as a demonstration of nationalistic and pro-independence sentiment in the region, and researcher Gordon M. Hahn has stated that the later Caucasus Emirate militant group "includes but is not reducible to" Al Qaeda. The growth of radical Islam in the Caucasus in the aftermath of the wars was recognised by Ayman al-Zawahiri, a high-ranking member of Al-Qaeda, as a potent source of recruits, and he noted that the North Caucasus was "one of three primary fronts in the war against the West".

Violence relating to the Wars in the Caucasus at times spilled outside of the region, primarily from North Caucasian Islamists into other parts of Russia. The first such instance happened during the Budyonnovsk hospital hostage crisis on 14 June 1995, when Chechen militants led by commander Shamil Basayev took several hostages at a hospital in southern Russia. After spetsnaz units failed to neutralise the militants, Prime Minister Viktor Chernomyrdin entered negotiations with Basayev. Chernomyrdin eventually agreed to some of Basayev's demands, including safe passage back to Chechnya. 129 people were killed during the attack, with an additional 415 injured. This was followed by another attack in Kizlyar, Dagestan the next year. The 1999 Russian apartment bombings, which served as a pretext for the Second Chechen War, were blamed on Chechen militants, though the extent to which this is true has been significantly debated.
