= Political status of Nagorno-Karabakh =

Status of a disputed region in the Caucasus

Soviet-era borders of Armenia, Azerbaijan, and Nagorno Karabakh

Aftermath of the 2020 Nagorno-Karabakh war Areas captured by Azerbaijan during the war, to stay under its control. Agdam District: to be evacuated by Armenia by 20 November. Kalbajar District: to be evacuated by Armenia by 25 November. Lachin District: to be evacuated by Armenia by 1 December. Part of Nagorno-Karabakh remaining under the control of Artsakh Lachin corridor, with Russian peacekeepers. The two access roads to Nagorno-Karabakh. All economic and transport connections in the region to be unblocked, including transport connections between Nakhchivan and rest of Azerbaijan (arrow's hypothetical location chosen by a Wikipedia user, and not defined by the statement itself) Line of Contact before the 2020 conflict. Other zones claimed by Artsakh.

The political status of Nagorno-Karabakh remained unresolved from its declaration of independence on 10 December 1991 to its September 2023 collapse. During Soviet times, it had been an ethnic Armenian autonomous oblast of the Azerbaijan Soviet Socialist Republic. Following the dissolution of the Soviet Union, a conflict arose between local Armenians who sought to have Nagorno-Karabakh join Armenia and local Azerbaijanis who opposed this.

The conflict soon escalated into ethnic cleansing and open warfare in the First Nagorno-Karabakh War, as a result of which the region came under the control of an Armenia-allied de facto state, the Republic of Artsakh. The surrounding regions of Azerbaijan were occupied by the self-declared republic under the justification of a "security belt," which was intended to be exchanged for recognition of autonomous status from Azerbaijan.

Negotiations took place sporadically over the following decades, during which a ceasefire generally prevailed between Armenia/Artsakh and Azerbaijan (albeit without peacekeeping forces). Turkey and Azerbaijan imposed a transport blockade of Armenia which remains in place today and took other diplomatic steps to isolate it. Meanwhile, the United Nations Security Council, OSCE Minsk Group, and other bodies made various statements and proposed dialogue initiatives, none of which were successful.

In the Second Nagorno-Karabakh War, Azerbaijani forces, backed by Turkey, took control of the southern half of the region, including Shusha and Hadrut. Armenia was forced to concede additional territories to preserve Stepanakert and the northern half of the Republic of Artsakh under local Armenian control, protected by Russian peacekeepers. The political status of this reduced region was not specified in the ceasefire agreement. In the wake of a tightened blockade by Azerbaijan, in which the Lachin Corridor was closed, and subsequent Azerbaijani offensive on 19 September 2023, the Artsakh government surrendered and voted to disband itself, effective 1 January 2024, although it later annulled this decree in exile for being unconstitutional. However, Armenia's prime-minister recognized Azerbaijan's sovereignty over Karabakh, and rejected the functioning of Nagorno-Karabakh government in exile in Armenia.

Virtually all of the Karabakhi Armenian population fled to Armenia via the newly-reopened Lachin Corridor. Despite being offered Azerbaijani citizenship, Karabakh's Armenian residents did not trust Azerbaijan's guarantees of security due to the country's history of human rights abuses, Armenophobia, and lack of rights to ethnic minorities.

The Republic of Artsakh was never recognized by any UN member state, including Armenia. For 30 years, international mediators and human rights organizations referred to the right of self-determination for the Armenian population. Following the second Nagorno-Karabakh War in 2020, Azerbaijan refused any special status or autonomy to its ethnically Armenian residents.

== Political ties with Armenia ==
In the 2005 case of Chiragov and others v. Armenia, the European Court of Human Rights decided that "the Republic of Armenia, from the early days of the Nagorno-Karabakh conflict, has had a significant and decisive influence over the 'NKR', [Nagorno-Karabakh Republic] that the two entities are highly integrated in virtually all important matters and that this situation persists to this day."

According to Human Rights Watch, "from the beginning of the Karabakh conflict, Armenia provided aid, weapons, and volunteers. Armenian involvement in Karabakh escalated after a December 1993 Azerbaijani offensive. The Republic of Armenia began sending conscripts and regular Army and Interior Ministry troops to fight in Karabakh."

However, the government of Armenia has never formally recognized the sovereignty of Artsakh and since 2022, its leadership has made statements suggesting it is ready to recognize the region as part of Azerbaijan, causing outrage across various sectors of Nagorno-Karabakh, including in its government.

== Positions and statements ==
=== United Nations ===
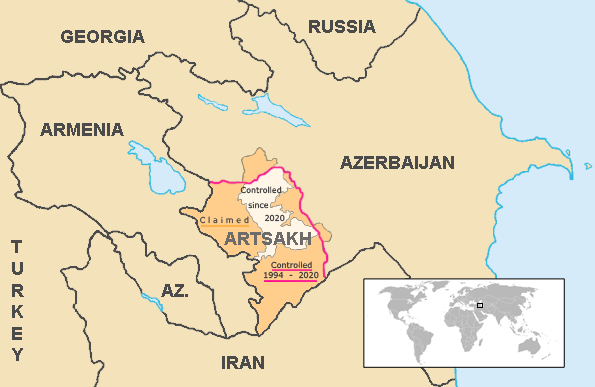
Territory controlled by the Republic of Artsakh from 1994 to 2020 Claimed by the Republic of Artsakh but controlled by Azerbaijan

Three UN Security Council Resolutions (853, 874, and 884) and United Nations General Assembly resolutions 49/13 and 57/298 refer to Nagorno-Karabakh as a region of Azerbaijan. None of these resolutions were passed under Chapter VII (Action with Respect to Threats to the Peace, Breaches of the Peace, and Acts of Aggression) of the Charter. Certain politicians and legal scholars have expressed the view that resolutions are only legally binding if they are made under Chapter VII of the Charter. However, the language of these four Resolutions indicates that they are "not mere recommendations or exhortations, but legally binding decisions." According to a report prepared by British parliamentarian and rapporteur David Atkinson, presented to Political Affairs Committee of the Parliamentary Assembly of the Council of Europe (PACE), "the borders of Azerbaijan were internationally recognised at the time of the country being recognised as independent state in 1991," and "the territory of Azerbaijan included the Nagorno-Karabakh region."

On 14 March 2008, the United Nations General Assembly passed a non-binding resolution by a vote of 39 to 7, with 100 abstentions, reaffirming Azerbaijan's territorial integrity, expressing support for that country's internationally recognized borders and demanding the immediate withdrawal of all Armenian forces from all occupied territories there. The resolution was supported mainly by members of the OIC and GUAM, both of which Azerbaijan is a member, as well as other nations facing breakaway regions. The resolution was opposed by all three co-chairs of the OSCE Minsk Group.

=== Council of Europe ===
The Resolution #1416, adopted by PACE in 2005, stated that "Considerable parts of the territory of Azerbaijan are still occupied by Armenian forces, and separatist forces are still in control of the Nagorno-Karabakh region." The resolution further stated: "The Assembly reiterates that the occupation of foreign territory by a member state constitutes a grave violation of that state’s obligations as a member of the Council of Europe and reaffirms the right of displaced persons from the area of conflict to return to their homes safely and with dignity." Recalling the Resolutions 822, 853, 874, and 884 (all from 1993) of the UN Security Council, PACE urged "the parties concerned to comply with them, in particular by refraining from any armed hostilities and by withdrawing military forces from any occupied territories." The resolution also called on "the Government of Azerbaijan to establish contact, without preconditions, with the political representatives of both communities from the Nagorno-Karabakh region regarding the future status of the region."

The Council of Europe called on the Nagorno-Karabakh de facto authorities to refrain from staging one-sided "local self-government elections" in Nagorno-Karabakh. "These so-called 'elections' cannot be legitimate," stressed Council of Europe Committee of Ministers' Chairman and Liechtenstein Foreign Minister Ernst Walch, Parliamentary Assembly President Lord Russell-Johnston and Secretary General Walter Schwimmer. They recalled that following the 1991–1994 armed conflict between Armenia and Azerbaijan, a substantial part of the region's population had been forced to flee their homes and was still living as displaced persons in those countries or as refugees abroad. This position was reiterated by Walter Schwimmer, Secretary General of the Council of Europe on 4 August 2004 with regard to the next elections, staged in the province, and by the Chair of the Council of Europe’s Committee of Ministers on 12 July 2007 with regard to the presidential elections organised in Nagorno-Karabakh.

In January 2016, the PACE adopted the Resolution #2085 entitled "Inhabitants of frontier regions of Azerbaijan are deliberately deprived of water" which stated that "the occupation by Armenia of Nagorno-Karabakh and other adjacent areas of Azerbaijan creates similar humanitarian and environmental problems for the citizens of Azerbaijan living in the Lower Karabakh valley". The resolution also requested "the immediate withdrawal of Armenian armed forces from the region" and "the Armenian authorities to cease using water resources as tools of political influence or an instrument of pressure".

A background paper prepared by the Directorate General of Political Affairs of the Council of Europe for the seminar "Youth and Conflict Resolution" (Strasbourg, 31 March – 2 April 2003) states, "The Armenian side maintains that the N-K independence referendum was conducted in accordance with the USSR law on the 'Procedure for Solving Issues of Secession of a Soviet Republic from the USSR' of 3 April 1990. Article 3 of this law provided autonomous regions within the Soviet republics with the right to determine independently, by referendum, whether they wished to remain within the USSR or join the republic seceding from the USSR. It would however seem that according to this law N-K would have the choice of two options – to remain within the USSR or to join independent Azerbaijan; N-K independence does not seem possible".

=== European Union ===
On 21 May 2010 Catherine Ashton, High Representative of the European Union for Foreign Affairs and Security Policy, stated: "I would like to recall that the European Union does not recognise the constitutional and legal framework within which the "parliamentary elections" in Nagorno Karabakh will be held this Sunday. This event should not prejudice the peaceful settlement of the Nagorno-Karabakh conflict". OSCE Minsk Group Co-Chairs stated that "Although the Co-Chairs understand the need for the de facto authorities in NK to try to organize democratically the public life of their population with such a procedure, they underscore again that Nagorno-Karabakh is not recognized as an independent and sovereign state by any of their three countries, nor by any other country, including Armenia. The Co-Chairs consider that this procedure should not preempt the determination of the final legal status of Nagorno-Karabakh in the broader framework of the peaceful settlement of the Nagorno-Karabakh conflict".

The European Union declared that "The European Union confirms its support for the territorial integrity of Azerbaijan, and recalls that it does not recognise the independence of Nagorno Karabakh. The European Union cannot consider legitimate the 'presidential elections' that were scheduled to take place on 11 August 2002 in Nagorno Karabakh". The European Union reiterated this position with regard to the presidential elections, held in the region in 2007.

According to the article in "The Journal of Conflict Resolution", the Armenian side "justified its claim by Article 70 of the Soviet Constitution, which affirms the right to self-determination of the peoples of the USSR. In fact, this recognition of the principle of self-determination is only part of a general declaratory statement about the nature of the Soviet federation: “The Union of Soviet Socialist Republics is an integral, federal, multi-national state formed on the principle of socialist federalism as a result of the free self-determination of nations and the voluntary association of equal Soviet Socialist Republics. The USSR embodies the state unity of the Soviet people and draws all its nations and nationalities together for the purpose of jointly building communism.” There is no mechanism, other than the right of the union republics to secede (Article 72 of the constitution), through which to express the right of self-determination".

==== European Parliament ====
On 20 May 2010, the European Parliament adopted a resolution "on the need for an EU strategy for the South Caucasus", which states that EU must pursue a strategy to promote stability, prosperity and conflict resolution in the South Caucasus. The resolution "calls on the parties to intensify their peace talk efforts for the purpose of a settlement in the coming months, to show a more constructive attitude and to abandon preferences to perpetuate the status quo created by force and with no international legitimacy, creating in this way instability and prolonging the suffering of the war-affected populations; condemns the idea of a military solution and the heavy consequences of military force already used, and calls on both parties to avoid any further breaches of the 1994 ceasefire". The resolution also "calls for withdrawal of Armenian forces from all occupied territories of Azerbaijan, accompanied by deployment of international forces to be organised with respect of the UN Charter in order to provide the necessary security guarantees in a period of transition, which will ensure the security of the population of Nagorno-Karabakh and allow the displaced persons to return to their homes and further conflicts caused by homelessness to be prevented"; and states that "the EU believes that the position according to which Nagorno-Karabakh includes all occupied Azerbaijani lands surrounding Nagorno-Karabakh should rapidly be abandoned". It also notes "that an interim status for Nagorno-Karabakh could offer a solution until the final status is determined and that it could create a transitional framework for peaceful coexistence and cooperation of Armenian and Azerbaijani populations in the region."

In October 2013, the European Parliament adopted the Resolution on the European Neighbourhood Policy in which it is stated that the occupation by one country of the Eastern Partnership (which includes Armenia and Azerbaijan) of the territory of another "violates the fundamental principles and objectives of the Eastern Partnership and that the resolution of the Nagorno-Karabakh conflict should comply with UN Security Council resolutions 822, 853, 874 and 884 of 1993 and the Organisation for Security and Cooperation in Europe (OSCE) Minsk Group Basic Principles, enshrined in the L’Aquila joint statement of 10 July 2009". This same document also states that "Parliament fully subscribes to the principles of sovereignty, territorial integrity and the right to self-determination of nations;"

On 15 November 2017, the European Parliament adopted a resolution "reaffirming its support to the OSCE Minsk Group co-chairs' efforts to solve the Nagorno-Karabakh conflict and to their 2009 Basic Principles, which include territorial integrity, self-determination and the non-use of force".

=== U.S. ===
The US Department of State's annual Country Reports on Human Rights Practices – 2006, released on 6 March 2007 stated that "Armenia continues to occupy the Azerbaijani territory of Nagorno-Karabakh and seven surrounding Azerbaijani territories. During the year incidents along the militarized line of contact separating the sides again resulted in numerous casualties on both sides".

=== Armenia ===
Armenia has not officially recognized the sovereign status of Artsakh. Armenia's government has stated that it would unilaterally recognize Artsakh only as an option of last resort to be used only if Azerbaijan resorted to military activity. In 2010, President Armen Sarkissian said "We wanted for Artsakh’s independence to be recognized as a result of the negotiations, and only after that Armenia would recognize it. At the same time, if the war goes on and there is no chance for the negotiations to resume, Armenia will most probably will have no choice but to recognize [Artsakh]...We believe that there is no military solution to this problem." When the Second Nagorno-Karabakh War started, Prime Minister Pashinyan stated that the Armenian government was considering unilaterally recognizing the independence of Nagorno-Karabakh. Responding to instances where Armenian farmers in Nagorno-Karabakh were killed or shot by Azerbaijani forces, Pashinyan tweeted “Azerbaijan calls Armenians of Nagorno-Karabakh ‘our citizens’ and, at the same time, shoots at them while they are doing agricultural work."

In September 2021, Armenia submitted a complaint to the International Court of Justice (ICJ) accusing Azerbaijan of ethnic discrimination of Armenians in violation of Azerbaijan's obligations under the International Convention on the Elimination of All Forms of Racial Discrimination (CERD). According to "responsibility to protect" (R2P), member states of the United Nations are obliged to intervene in cases of serious human rights issues. R2P is associated with the notion of "remedial secession," the justification for a minority population seceding from a country if it faces total annihilation within that country's borders.

=== Republic of Artsakh ===
The declaration of establishment of the Nagorno Karabakh Republic, issued on 2 September 1991, states that the republic was proclaimed pursuant to the USSR law of secession (adopted in 1990), and that it "enjoys the authorities given to Republics by the USSR Constitution and legislation and reserves the right to decide independently the issue of its state-legal status based on political consultations and negotiations with the leadership of Union and Republics." The Declaration further states that "the USSR Constitution and legislation, as well as other laws currently in force, which do not contradict the goals and principles of this Declaration and peculiarities of the Republic apply on the territory of the Nagorno Karabakh Republic, until the NKR Constitution and laws are adopted."

=== Azerbaijan ===
Azerbaijan refused to recognize the Republic of Artsakh; however, in a 2016 interview, Azerbaijani President Ilham Aliyev offered Nagorno-Karabakh the status of "an autonomous republic" if Armenian troops withdrew from the surrounding regions. This was the first time that an Azerbaijani leader had used the word "republic" to refer to the Armenian-controlled enclave. The U.S. Co-Chair of the OSCE Minsk Group praised these remarks as move to open "discussions on status." However, since the 2020 Nagorno-Karabakh War, Azerbaijan no longer promises any special status or autonomy to ethnic Armenians who live in Nagorno-Karabakh.

The Ministry of Foreign Affairs of Azerbaijan stated in a 2008 statement that, according to the 1990 Soviet law on secession, which was used by the Karabakh side to justify its independence, "in a Union republic containing autonomous republics, autonomous provinces and autonomous regions, the referendum had to be held separately in each autonomous unit, the people of which retained the right to decide independently the question of staying in the USSR or in the seceding Union republic, as well as to raise the question of their own state-legal status. It is important to emphasize that the secession of a Union republic from the USSR could be regarded valid only after the fulfillment of complicated and multi-staged procedure and, finally, the adoption of the relevant decision by the Congress of the USSR People's Deputies. However, until the Soviet Union ceased to exist as international person, the mentioned Law was without legal effect, since no Union republic, including Azerbaijan and Armenia, had used the procedure for secession stipulated in it".

Azerbaijani president Ilham Aliyev previously said the region would receive “the highest [political] autonomy in the world” but after Azerbaijan's victory in the 2020 war, he and other Azerbaijan officials have completely rescinded the offer. Azerbaijani officials deny that the conflict persists, claiming that the entity of Nagorno-Karabakh no longer exists and have threatened military action if the Artsakh government does not disband.

Azerbaijani President Aliyev has said that "Armenians living in Karabakh must either accept Azerbaijani citizenship or look for another place to live" and that "I am sure that the majority of the Armenian population living in Karabakh today is ready to accept Azerbaijani citizenship. It's just that these leeches, these wild animals, the separatists [referring to Artsakh government officials] don't allow it." Despite being offered Azerbaijani citizenship, Armenian residents of Nagorno-Karabakh do not trust Azerbaijan's guarantees of security due to the country's history of human rights abuses, Armenophobia, and lack of rights to ethnic minorities.

In its attempt to isolate the region, the Azerbaijani government blacklists individuals from humanitarian organizations and journalists who work in Artsakh. As a result of this, the only international organizations who work within Artsakh are HALO and the ICRC. The Parliamentary Assembly of the Council of Europe and Reporters Without Borders have called on Azerbaijan to allow international organizations, including United Nations agencies, to access the region.

=== OSCE Minsk Group ===
On 26 June 2010, the presidents of the OSCE Minsk Group's Co-Chair countries, France, the Russian Federation, and the United States of America made a joint statement, reaffirming their "commitment to support the leaders of Armenia and Azerbaijan as they finalize the Basic Principles for the peaceful settlement of the Nagorno-Karabakh conflict".

The OSCE Minsk Group has allowed the Nagorno-Karabakh Republic (referring to it as the "leadership of Nagorny Karabakh"), as well as Armenia and Azerbaijan, to participate in the peace process as "parties to the conflict," and the Azerbaijani community of the region – as an "interested party". The Chairman of the CSCE Minsk Conference mentioned that "the terms 'party to the conflict' and 'leadership of Nagorny Karabakh' do not imply recognition of any diplomatic or political status under domestic or international law". The Azerbaijani community is led by Tural Ganjaliyev, the head of the executive power of Shusha region.

At a 2007 press conference in Yerevan, Yuri Merzlyakov, the OSCE Minsk Group Russian Co-Chair stated, "At the press conference in Baku, I underlined that Nagorno Karabakh was a part of Azerbaijani SSR and not of Azerbaijan. I perfectly know that till 1917 Nagorno Karabakh was a part of the Russian Empire. The history is necessary in order to settle conflicts, but it is necessary to proceed from international law". Meanwhile, on 10 June 2007 after US-Azerbaijani security consultations in Washington D.C., with Azerbaijani Deputy Foreign Minister Araz Azimov, Deputy Assistant Secretary of US Department of State, US Co-Chairman of OSCE Minsk group Matthew Bryza in a joint press conference announced: "In the circles of international law there is no universal formula for the supremacy of territorial integrity over the right of self-determination of people." German Chancellor Olaf Scholz said in March 2023 that competing principles of territorial integrity and self-determination are "equally applicable" in the Nagorno-Karabakh conflict and the Armenian-Azerbaijan border crisis.

== Remedial secession ==
Various political analysts and international observers have emphasized self-determination for the indigenous Armenian population, both as an internationally recognized right and as a form of genocide prevention. According to the principle of remedial secession, a group of people can unilaterally secede in order to protect themselves from the parent state's oppressive regime, a principal enacted by Kosovo to support its independence from Serbia. Various politicians and political analysts have argued that the Republic of Nagorno-Karabakh may also be eligible for enacting remedial secession due to the extreme anti-Armenianism within Azerbaijan.

Geoffrey Robertson, first president of the UN's War Crimes Court for Sierra Leone, listed the pogroms of Sumgait (1988) and Baku (1990), Operation Ring (1991), the Siege of Stepanakert (1991), and the Blockade of Nagorno-Karabakh as incidents of "excessive discrimination and systematic violations" which justified remedial secession for Nagorno-Karabakh.

== Independence recognition efforts ==
=== Non-UN member states ===
The sovereign status of the Republic of Artsakh has not been recognized by any United Nations member state (including Armenia), but was recognized by Transnistria, Abkhazia and South Ossetia; Transnistria is not recognized by any UN member state, while the latter two are recognized by several UN member states.

Entity	Date of recognition	Notes
Abkhazia	17 November 2006	Mutual recognition
South Ossetia	1 December 2006	Mutual recognition
Transnistria	4 July 2001 or before	Mutual recognition

=== Australia ===
In October 2012, the Australian state of New South Wales recognized Nagorno-Karabakh however, the Australian foreign minister reaffirmed in November 2015 that the federal government of the Commonwealth of Australia does not, and supports Azerbaijan's claim to the state. In 2017, The Australian Greens announced that they recognize the Republic of Artsakh (Nagorno-Karabakh).

In October 2020, the New South Wales Legislative Assembly recognized Artsakh. On 9 November 2020, the city of Willoughby recognized the independence of Artsakh.

In February 2021, the state of South Australia recognized the independence of Artsakh.

=== Canada ===
Following the outbreak of the 2020 Nagorno-Karabakh war, Senator Leo Housakos called for a motion for Canada to recognize Nagorno-Karabakh as an independent country.

On 5 November 2020, the city of Laval in Quebec recognized the independence of Artsakh.

On 8 December 2020, the Senate of Canada rejected a motion on "condemning the Azerbaijani-Turkish aggression" and recognizing the independence of Artsakh.

=== Czechia ===
On 27 October 2020, the municipal district of Řeporyje, Czechia recognized the independence of Artsakh.

=== France ===
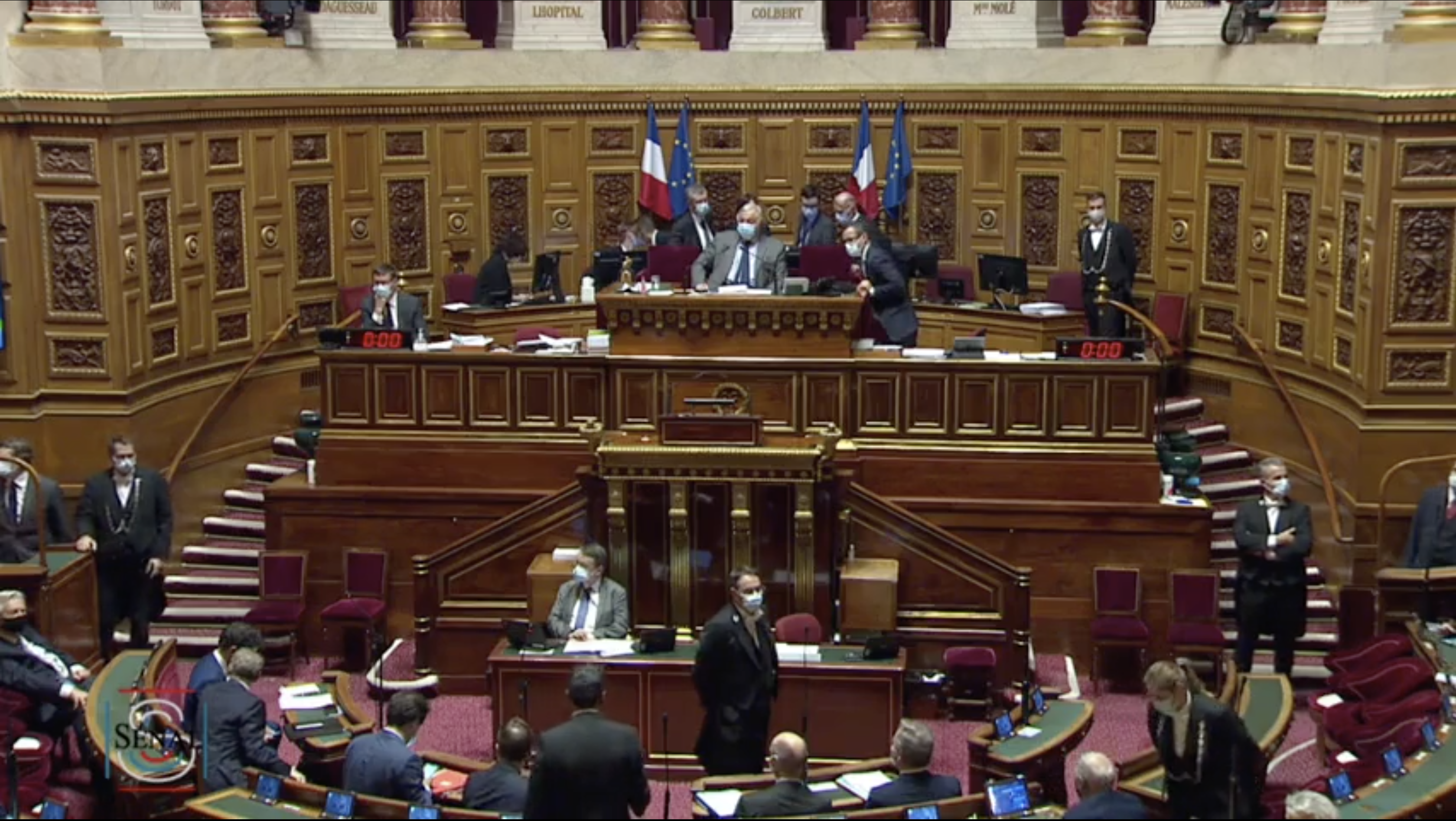
French Senate adopts resolution calling for recognition of the Republic of Artsakh. 25 November 2020

Independence of Artsakh is recognized by the cities of Alfortville, Limonest, and Vienne. A Bill on recognition of the Artsakh Republic was submitted to the French National Assembly on 14 October 2020.

On 6 November 2020, the Assembly of Corsica adopted a resolution on the recognition of the Artsakh Republic.

On 18 November 2020, the Council of Paris, the legislative body governing Paris, recognized the independence of Artsakh and called on the French government to follow.

On 21 November 2020, the city council of Saint-Étienne recognized the independence of Artsakh, while on the same date, the Aix-Marseille-Provence Metropolis called for the French government to recognize Artsakh. On 24 November 2020, the city of Décines-Charpieu and the Grenoble-Alpes Métropole both called for the recognition of Artsakh by the French government.

On 25 November 2020, the French Senate adopted a resolution calling for recognition of the independence of Artsakh. However, following the resolution adopted by France's Senate, a French Foreign Ministry spokesperson stated “France does not recognize the self-proclaimed Nagorno-Karabakh Republic.”

On 1 December 2020, the Asnières-sur-Seine and Métropole Nice Côte d'Azur municipal council's called on the French Government to recognize Artsakh.

On 3 December 2020, the National Assembly of France adopted a resolution urging the French Government to recognize Artsakh.

Between 17 and 21 December 2020, the commune of Issy-les-Moulineaux, the department of Hauts-de-Seine, and the cities of Sarcelles, Clamart, and Montpellier adopted resolutions calling for the recognition of Artsakh. Meanwhile, the city of Valence recognized Artsakh's independence.

=== Guatemala ===
The City Hall of Sayaxché, Guatemala has officially recognized the right to self-determination of the Armenians of Artsakh and is supporting the creation of a free and sovereign state.

=== Italy ===
On 15 October 2020, the Italian city of Milan became the first ever large European city to recognize the Republic of Artsakh. Recognitions by Palermo, Asolo, Cerchiara di Calabria, and the Italian region of Lombardy followed within a fortnight. On 4 November 2020, the city of Campobasso recognized Artsakh. The following day, similar motions recognizing Artsakh was passed by the municipalities of Bleggio Superiore and Drena.

On 18 November 2020, the city of Viareggio recognized Artsakh's independence. On 19 November 2020, Aprilia and Pisa recognized the independence of Artsakh. On 25 November 2020, the city of Schio recognized the independence of Artsakh.

On 26 November 2020, the municipality of San Giorgio di Nogaro recognized the independence of Artsakh. On 2 December 2020, the municipality of Malo announced its recognition of Artsakh, followed by the towns of Ariccia on 11 December 2020 and San Pietro Vernotico on 31 December 2020.

On 2 April 2021, the municipality of San Vito dei Normanni recognized the independence of Artsakh.

On 26 May 2021, the Metropolitan City of Reggio Calabria also recognized the Republic of Artsakh.

=== Spain ===
In September 2014, the Basque parliament adopted a motion supporting Nagorno-Karabakh's right to self-determination.

On 22 October 2020, the Parliament of Catalonia adopted a motion supporting the Nagorno-Karabakh ceasefire and the recognition of the Artsakh Republic.

On 30 October 2020, the Catalan city of Amposta recognized the independence of Artsakh.

On 6 November 2020, the city of Berga in Catalonia recognized the independence of Artsakh. On 21 December 2020, Santa Pau recognized the sovereignty of Artsakh.

=== United Kingdom ===
On 25 November 2020, the Derby City Council unanimously passed a resolution to recognize the independence of the Republic of Artsakh. The city of Derby thus becoming the first city in the United Kingdom to adopt such a resolution.

=== U.S. states and communities ===
U.S. states' recognition of Artsakh

Passed a bill recognizing Artsakh	Rejected a bill recognizing Azerbaijani territorial integrity	Rejected a bill recognizing Artsakh	Passed a bill recognizing Azerbaijani territorial integrity
California (May & August 2014); Colorado (April 2019); Georgia House of Representatives (March 2016); Hawaii (March 2016); Idaho (April 2021); Louisiana (May 2013); Maine (10 April 2013) Receded (30 April 2013); Massachusetts (August 2012); Michigan (September 2017); Minnesota (May 2020); New Jersey (June 2021); Rhode Island (May 2012)	Hawaii (February 2014); Kentucky (March 2016); Mississippi (April 2014); South Dakota (February 2014); Tennessee (March 2014); Wyoming (February 2014)	Georgia Senate (March 2016) Vermont (April 2014)	Arizona (January 2014); New Mexico (February 2014)

Before California recognized Nagorno-Karabakh in May 2014, three places within the state had already recognized it:

- Fresno County (April 2013)
- Highland (November 2013)
- Los Angeles (January 2014)

In addition, Highland is twinned with Lachin and Montebello is twinned with Stepanakert.

On 20 April 2016, the city of Honolulu, Hawaii recognized Artsakh. On 21 September 2016, the city of Denver, Colorado recognized the independence of Artsakh.

In 2020, the Artsakh Republic was recognized by:

- Fitchburg, Massachusetts
- Fort Lee Borough
- Glendale, California
- Fowler
- Englewood Cliffs, New Jersey
- Clark County, Nevada
- Ridgefield, New Jersey
- Cliffside Park, New Jersey
- Orange County

In 2021, the Artsakh Republic was recognized by:

- Twin Falls, Idaho
- West Hollywood
- Burbank, California
- Oxford, Ohio
- Rancho Cordova, California

=== Uruguay ===
On 13 November 2020, the legislature of Uruguay's Montevideo Department unanimously recognized the independence of the Republic of Artsakh.

== Status after the 2020 Nagorno-Karabakh War ==
Since the 2020 Nagorno-Karabakh War, Azerbaijan has rescinded its offer of special status or autonomy to its indigenous Armenian residents and instead insists on their "integration" into Azerbaijan. In 2023, Azerbaijani President Aliyev said that Armenian residents of Nagorno-Karabakh must be "reintegrated" as "normal citizen[s] of Azerbaijan" and that "the [special] status [for Armenians] went to hell. It failed; it was shattered to smithereens. It is not and will not be there. As long as I am president, there will be no status." Aliyev also threatened military action if the Artsakh government does not disband.

Despite being offered Azerbaijani citizenship, Artsakh residents do not trust Azerbaijan's guarantees of security due to the country's history of human rights abuses, Armenophobia, and lack of rights to ethnic minorities. Various human rights observers, scholars specializing in genocide studies, and politicians consider the blockade of Nagorno-Karabakh to be a form of ethnic cleansing and warn of the risk of genocide. Many international observers also do not consider Azerbaijan's claim that Artsakh Armenians can live safely under Aliyev’s regime to be credible.

Caucasus expert, Laurence Broers wrote "the blockade [of Nagorno-Karabakh] renders irrelevant any talk of the civil integration of Karabakh Armenians. It vindicates the worst fears of the Karabakh Armenian population." If Azerbaijan takes control over the region, political analysts predict that Azerbaijan will arbitrarily detain and torture civilians, under the pretext of their association with the Artsakh government or with previous wars. At least two incidents of Azerbaijani forces detaining Armenian residents around Azerbaijan's military checkpoint have been confirmed.

== 2023 Azerbaijani offensive and dissolution of the Artsakh Republic ==
Following the Azerbaijani offensive in Nagorno-Karabakh on 19 September 2023, Artsakh agreed to dissolve itself by 1 January 2024, although later in exile it annulled this decree for being unconstitutional. However Armenia's prime-minister Nikol Pashinyan publicly recognized Azerbaijani sovereignty over Karabakh and repeatedly stated that the Karabakh issue was closed for his administration. Pashinyan stated that there can only be one government in Armenia, and criticized attempts of the former NKR officials to present themselves as a government in exile, which he considered a "national security problem for Armenia" that the law enforcement needed to deal with.

== See also ==
- Armenian-occupied territories surrounding Nagorno-Karabakh
- Community for Democracy and Rights of Nations
- Foreign relations of Artsakh
- List of representative offices of Artsakh
- Madrid Principles
- Republic of Artsakh
- Visa policy of Artsakh
