= United Nations General Assembly Resolution 48/114 =

UN United Nations General Assembly 48/114
- Date: 20 December 1993
- Meeting no.: 48th session, 85th plenary meeting
- Code: A/RES/48/114 (Document)
- Subject: Emergency international assistance to refugees and displaced persons in Azerbaijan
- Voting summary: none voted against; none abstained
- Result: Adopted without a vote

United Nations General Assembly Resolution 48/114 of 20 December 1993 is a resolution in which the General Assembly expressed its concern at the ongoing degradation of the humanitarian situation in Azerbaijan because of the displacement of considerable number of citizens due to Nagorno Karabakh conflict and supporting "emergency international assistance to refugees and displaced persons in Azerbaijan". The resolution is titled “48/114. Emergency international assistance to refugees and displaced persons in Azerbaijan”. It became the fifth United Nations document concerning Nagorno-Karabakh and the first United Nations General Assembly document on humanitarian aid to those affected by this conflict. This resolution was the first international document affirming the number of refugees and displaced persons in Azerbaijan exceeded one million. The document does not make any specific reference to previous UN resolutions on the ongoing conflict, but "its relevant resolutions regarding humanitarian assistance to refugees and displaced persons". The resolution was adopted by consensus without voting.

== Background ==
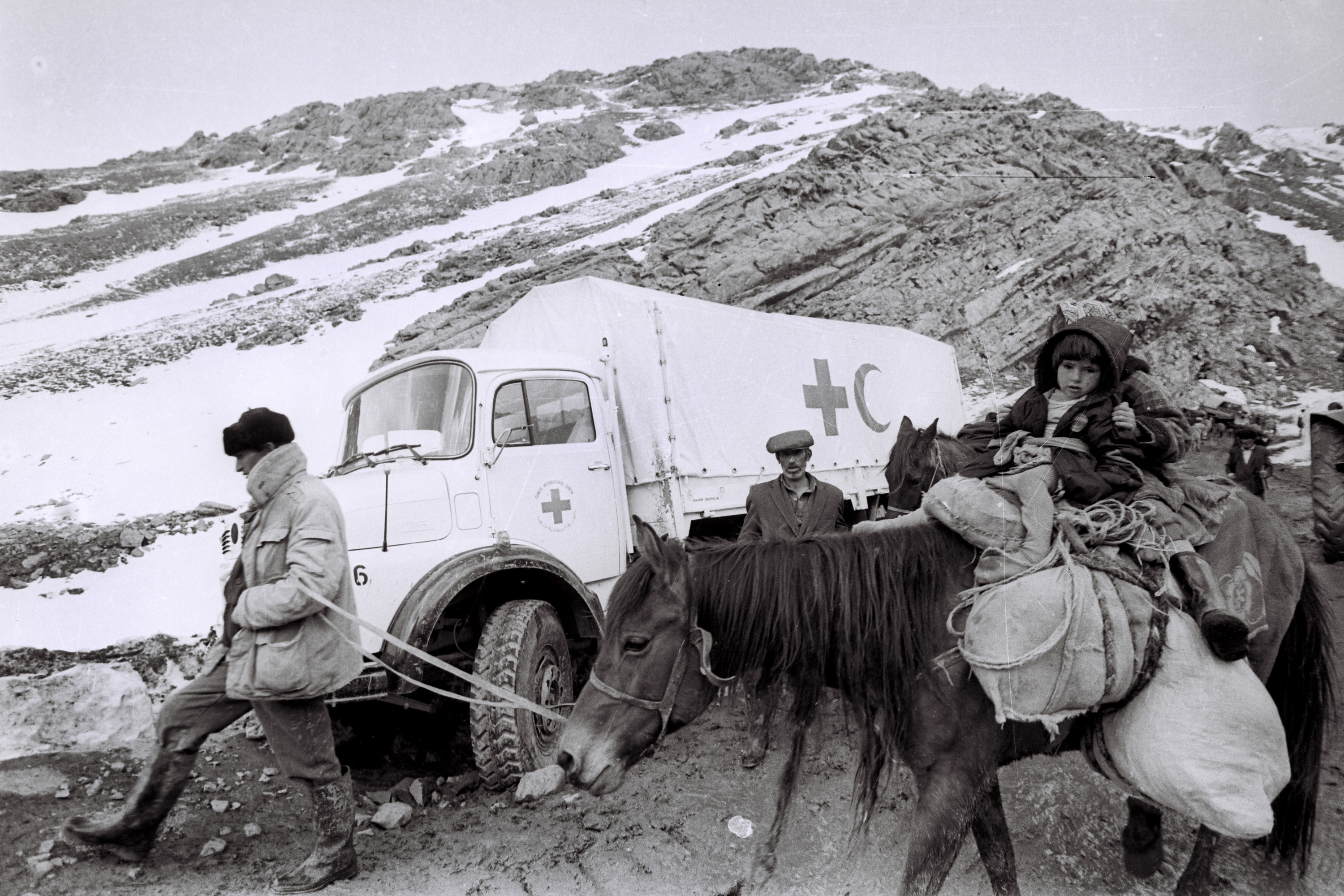
Displaced civilians from Kalbajar fleeing over the Murovdağ (1993)

In 1988, following the outbreak of the First Karabakh War, Azerbaijan faced the threat of violation of its territorial integrity. In 1992, the war began to escalate and numerous diplomatic efforts failed. Following the increasingly complicated refugee problem, Azerbaijan became the first CIS state to join the UN Convention on the Status of Refugees and the 1967 Protocol in February 1993, along with Russia. Azerbaijan could sustain its resistance, however, by the middle of 1993, it had lost control of Nagorno-Karabakh and several regions which were recently liberated in counteroffensive.

Soon after, Armenian forces captured the Kalbajar District in violation of the laws of war. On 30 April 1993, the UN Security council adopted resolution 822 demanding "withdrawal of all occupying forces from the Kelbadjar district and other recently occupied areas of Azerbaijan" and calling for "unimpeded access for international humanitarian relief efforts in the region ... to alleviate the suffering of the civilian population". Less than a week after the capture, the State Committee of Azerbaijan for Refugees and IDPs reported that 9,582 families from Kalbajar were registered. During the summer, the Armenian forces made significant gains into Agdam, non-implementing the UN resolution. By the end of 1993, the Azerbaijan–Iran border of 132 kilometers was under the Armenian control. As per estimates by Thomas de Waal, the conflict made Azerbaijan the "leader" in the world with the number of refugees per capita, as every tenth person in the country was forced to leave his home due to the conflict, whereas the UNHCR assessed it as one out of eight people.

By turning approximately one million Azerbaijanis into IDPs, the large-scale warfare led to the humanitarian crisis that Azerbaijan could not deal with it alone. Amidst an exacerbated and deteriorated situation, the government successively enacted legislative acts providing concessions and guarantees for refugees and IDPs. Starting in January 1993, the UN launched a humanitarian aid programme in Azerbaijan, to be effective by May. After the occupation of Kalbajar and other regions, the number of IDPs greatly increased and it led to more requests from Azerbaijan, consequently an expansion of the scope of aid, even if it did not change essentially. In June 1993, considering the rapid deterioration of the humanitarian situation in Azerbaijan, the UN organized an interagency humanitarian programme. Although the program lasted from 1 July 1993 until 31 March 1994, shortly after its commencement, it found the number of refugees and IDPs exceeding one million.

As mentioned in the resolution No. 48/114, until adoption of this document, a number of states, especially neighboring countries, provide necessary humanitarian aid to Azerbaijan. Turkish Red Crescent allocated tent camps and clothes for up to 100,000 displaced people in Agjabadi and Barda. However, in 1996, due to lack of funds, the organization was forced into leaving the country, handing over the tents to the International Red Cross and Red Crescent Society. On 6 September 1993, Azerbaijan signed a humanitarian aid protocol with Iran. Accordingly, Helal Ahmar set up 7 tent camps for 55,000 IDPs within a month. Fearful of possible social instability in its northern border which was mostly populated by ethnic Azerbaijanis, Iran dispatched tents for 100,000 displaced people in the border region of Imishli and transported IDPs who forcibly fled over the Aras river into Iran after occupation of Zangilan District.

== History ==
On September 23, 1993, the United Nations General Assembly (UN GA) made a decision to include the “Report of the High Commissioner for Refugees, questions relating to the refugees, returnees and displaced persons and humanitarian questions” in the agenda (item 113) of its forty-eighth session upon recommendation of the general committee.

During the 34th meeting of the Committee for Social, Humanitarian and Cultural Issues on November 16, 1993, the representative of Azerbaijan on behalf of Afghanistan, Azerbaijan, Bangladesh, Bosnia and Herzegovina, Costa Rica, Cuba, Egypt, Ethiopia, Iran, Jordan, Kuwait, Kyrgyzstan, Malaysia, Morocco, Pakistan, Saudi Arabia, Sierra Leone, Tajikistan, Turkey and Yemen submitted a draft resolution under the name of “Emergency international assistance to refugees and displaced persons in Azerbaijan” (A/C.3/48/L.23).

At the meeting the representative of Armenia suggested amendments to the draft resolution consisting of 14 paragraphs (A/C.3/48/L.29). However, after 6 days, on November 22, 1993, at the 38th meeting, the committee chair stated that Armenia withdrew its amendments to the draft resolution.

=== Sponsoring countries ===
At the next meeting, the representative of Azerbaijan, on behalf of Afghanistan, Azerbaijan, Bangladesh, Bosnia and Herzegovina, Costa Rica, Cuba, Egypt, Ethiopia, Guinea-Bissau, Iran, Jordan, Kazakhstan, Kuwait, Kyrgyzstan, Malaysia, Morocco, Pakistan, the Republic of Moldova, Saudi Arabia, Sierra Leone, Tajikistan, Turkey, Ukraine and Yemen, submitted a final draft of the resolution (A/C.3/48/L.23/Rev.1). Belarus and Senegal supported the sponsoring of the revised draft resolution.

The committee approved the draft resolution (A/C.3/48/L.23/Rev.1) without a vote at the 39th meeting. Belgium issued a statement on behalf of the European Union. The report of the committee also included the draft resolution titled “Emergency international assistance to refugees and displaced persons in Azerbaijan”. It was introduced to the 48th Plenary Session of the UN GA (A/48/631).

On December 20, 1993, the resolution was discussed in the Plenary meeting of the UN GA. The President of the 48th session proposed to adopt the resolution without a vote, and the committee approved this course of action. Resolution 48/114 entitled “Emergency international assistance to refugees and displaced persons in Azerbaijan” was then passed and then continued.

== Full text ==
The General Assembly, recalling its relevant resolutions regarding humanitarian assistance to refugees and displaced persons, having considered the report of the United Nations High Commissioner for Refugees, recognizing the catalytic role that the High Commissioner plays, together with the international community and development agencies, in the promotion of humanitarian aid and development with a view to finding durable and lasting solutions for refugees and displaced persons, expressing its grave concern at the continuing deterioration of the humanitarian situation in Azerbaijan owing to the displacement of large numbers of civilians.

Welcoming the efforts made by the United Nations interim office and the Office of the United Nations High Commissioner for Refugees in Azerbaijan to coordinate the needs assessment and the provision of humanitarian assistance.

Welcoming also the consolidated United Nations inter-agency humanitarian programme for Azerbaijan for the period 1 July 1993 to 31 March 1994. Expressing its appreciation to the States and intergovernmental and non‑governmental organizations that have responded positively and continue to respond to the humanitarian needs of Azerbaijan, and to the Secretary-General and United Nations bodies for mobilizing and coordinating the delivery of appropriate humanitarian assistance.

Also, expressing its appreciation to the Governments of the neighboring States that provide the necessary humanitarian assistance, including the provision of accommodation and transit routes through their territories for the displaced persons from Azerbaijan.

Noting with alarm that the humanitarian situation in Azerbaijan has continued to deteriorate seriously since the adoption of the programme in June 1993 and that the number of refugees and displaced persons in Azerbaijan has recently exceeded one million.

Aware that the refugees and displaced persons are in a precarious situation, facing the threat of malnutrition and disease, and that appropriate external assistance is needed for the provision of foodstuffs, medical aid and the necessary shelter for the winter,

Deeply concerned about the enormous burden that the massive presence of refugees and displaced persons has placed on the country's infrastructure,

Affirming the urgent need to continue international action to assist Azerbaijan in providing shelter, medication and food to the refugees and displaced persons, especially to the most vulnerable groups,

1. Welcomes with appreciation the efforts undertaken by the Secretary-General in drawing the attention of the international community to the acute problems of the Azerbaijani refugees and displaced persons and in mobilizing assistance for them;

2. Urgently appeals to all States, organizations and programmes of the United Nations, specialized agencies and other intergovernmental and non‑governmental organizations to provide adequate and sufficient financial, medical and material assistance to the Azerbaijani refugees and displaced persons;

3. Invites the international financial institutions and the specialized agencies, organizations, and programmes of the United Nations system, where appropriate, to bring the special needs of the Azerbaijani refugees and displaced persons to the attention of their respective governing bodies for their consideration and to report on the decisions of those bodies to the Secretary-General;

4. Invites the Secretary-General to continue to monitor the overall situation of refugees and displaced persons in Azerbaijan and to make available his good offices as required;

5. Requests the United Nations High Commissioner for Refugees to continue her efforts with the appropriate United Nations agencies and intergovernmental, governmental and non‑governmental organizations, in order to consolidate and increase essential services to refugees and displaced persons in Azerbaijan;

6. Requests the Secretary-General to report to the General Assembly at its forty-ninth session on the progress made in the implementation of the present resolution.

Adopted 85th plenary meeting of the United Nations General Assembly on 20 December 1993 without a vote.

— A/RES/48/114 - 85th plenary meeting - 20 December 1993

== Aftermath ==
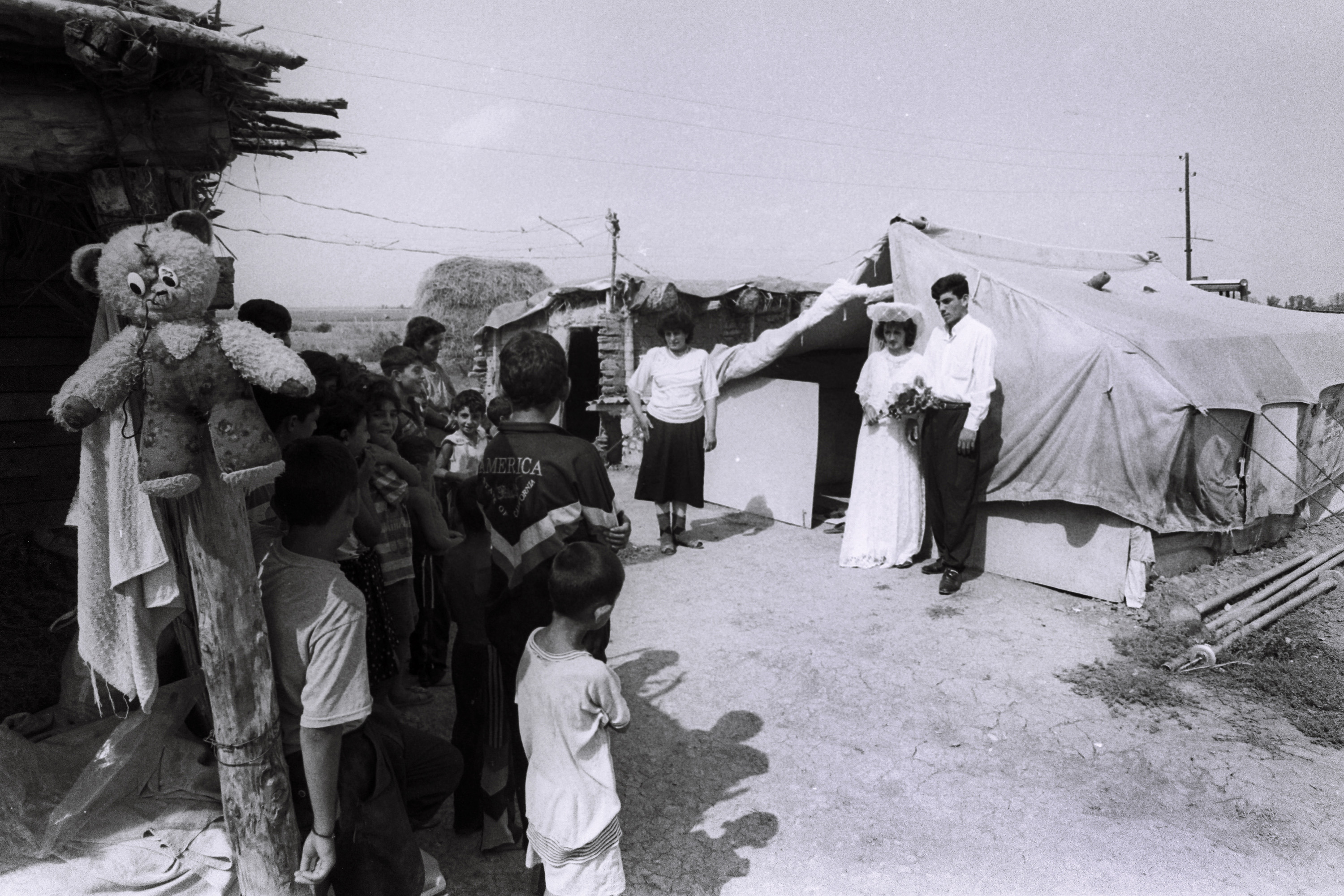
A wedding ceremony held in a tent camp of IDPs in Tartar (by Ilgar Jafarov, 1996)

On 12 May 1994, the parties signed a Russian-brokered ceasefire agreement ending the First Nagorno-Karabakh War which some called a "hopeless warfare". Even after the ceasefire, Iran provided humanitarian aid in Saatli and Imishli, Turkey in Barda and Aghjabadi, and Saudi Arabia in Barda, by stocking tent camps and food to Azerbaijan. Some of these camps were set up in Bilasuvar, Beylagan and Sabirabad. After the armed conflict, IDPs settled mainly in student dormitories, schools and other public buildings in Baku, and in tents, Finnish houses, or wagons in the surrounding areas and districts.

Soon afterwards, according the resolution No. 48/114, the UN High Commissioner for Refugees released a report. Thereafter, the UN Secretary General published a report noted "Turkey provided US$ 51 million in humanitarian and emergency relief assistance to Azerbaijan in 1993 and between January and October 1994, of which $5 million have been earmarked for the Autonomous Republic of Nakhichevan." As per the report, consignments of relief aid included tons of wheat, food, medicines, medical supplies, blankets, sanitation equipment, and fuel oil.

As of 13 September 1994, besides Turkey, Iran and Saudi Arabia, the donors to Azerbaijan were: Egypt, Pakistan, Switzerland, United States, European Union, World Bank, United Kingdom, Norway, Japan, International Federation of Red Cross and Red Crescent Societies, Oxfam UK, Médecins Sans Frontières (Belgium), Relief International (USA), Care International (Canada), and ADRA (USA).

== See also ==
- List of United Nations Security Council resolutions on the Nagorno-Karabakh conflict
