= Əhmədli, Dashkasan =

Əhmədli, Dashkasan may refer to:

- Əhmədli (40° 28' N 46° 09' E), Dashkasan
- Əhmədli (40° 31' N 45° 54' E), Dashkasan
