= Thomas Goltz =

American author and journalist (1954–2023)

- Born: October 11, 1954; Japan
- Died: July 29, 2023 (aged 68)
- Education: New York University
- Occupations: Journalist and author
- Known for: Coverage of the Wars in the Caucasus

Thomas Goltz (October 11, 1954 – July 29, 2023) was an American author and journalist best known for his accounts of the Wars in the Caucasus during the 1990s. He spent 15 years in and around Turkey and the Caucasus.

== Career ==
He directed and co-produced a documentary for Global Vision's Rights and Wrongs program which was a finalist in the Rory Peck Award for excellence in television journalism in 1996.

Goltz has written news for most leading U.S. publications, including The New York Times, the Los Angeles Times, The Wall Street Journal and The Washington Post. In-depth articles by Goltz have appeared in Foreign Policy magazine, The National Interest, The Washington Quarterly and other broad-based magazines. In electronic media, he has worked on or produced video documentaries on a variety of topics for ABC/Nightline, BBC/Correspondent and CBS/60 Minutes.

He became known mainly as a crisis correspondent due to his coverage of the Wars in the Caucasus; in particular, he covered the First Nagorno-Karabakh War between Armenia and Azerbaijan and separatist conflicts in Abkhazia and in Chechnya.

He spent time in Samashki, Chechnya before the massacre happened there. He made video reports about the massacre immediately afterwards. Goltz made a film out of them which was in mainstream in the United States, the United Kingdom, and even in Russia.

On August 22, 2000, Goltz carried the symbolic "first barrel of oil" from Baku, Azerbaijan with IMZ sidecar motorcycle, to Ceyhan, Turkey with other 25 riders. They used to future Baku-Tbilisi-Ceyhan pipeline route at the time. The aim was to draw attention to a megaproject symbolizing both Azerbaijan's and Georgia's economic independence.

He lectured at most leading US universities including Columbia, Georgetown, Berkeley, Northwestern, Princeton, etc. and foreign policy-related institutes in Azerbaijan, Canada, Georgia, the United Kingdom and the United States. Other than that he was also professor in Montana State University. In 2020, he was awarded an honorary PhD by the ADA University.

== Personal life ==
Thomas Goltz was born in Japan and raised in North Dakota. He graduated from New York University with an MA in Middle East studies. He married Hicran Oge in 1984 in Istanbul, Turkey. Goltz spoke English, German, Turkish, and Azerbaijani fluently. He knew some Arabic, Russian and Japanese too. He died on July 29, 2023, at the age of 68 after a long illness. Azerbaijani President Ilham Aliyev sent a condolences message to his family and described Goltz as "great friend of Azerbaijan".

== Controversy ==
The Armenian National Committee of Canada accused Goltz of racism in March 2009 for remarks made at a lecture allegedly sponsored by Assembly of Azerbaijani-Canadian Organizations. According to the Armenian National Committee, Goltz characterized the Armenian inhabitants of Nagorno-Karabakh as "garlic-growing Armenians", and selectively mentioned instances of ethnic cleansing by Armenians against Azerbaijanis while omitting mention of cases of ethnic cleansing of Armenians by Azerbaijanis.

== Books ==
- Requiem for a would-be republic (1994)
- Goltz, Thomas (1998). Azerbaijan Diary: A ROGUE REPORTER'S ADVENTURES IN AN OIL-RICH, WAR-TORN POST-SOVIET REPUBLIC. M.E. Sharpe. ISBN 076560244X.
- Oil Odyssey (2000)
- Chechnya Diary: A War Correspondent's Story of Surviving the War in Chechnya (2003) ISBN 0312268742
- Georgia Diary: A Chronicle of War and Political Chaos in the Post-Soviet Caucasus (2006) ISBN 0765617102
- Assassinating Shakespeare: Confessions of a Bard in the Bush (2006) ISBN 0863567185
- Türkiye Diary ('The Bridge'): Forty Years Of Intimate Association With A Wayward US Eurasian Ally (2020)
- Zakhrafa : Memories of a disappearing Middle East (2021)

== See also ==
- Thomas De Waal
