= Əhmədli, Lachin =

Ahmedli
- Azerbaijani: Əhmədli
- Location within Azerbaijan Location within East Zangezur Economic Region
- Coordinates: 39°41′04″N 46°17′10″E
- Country: Azerbaijan
- District: Lachin

Population (2015)
  - Total: 50
- Time zone: UTC+4 (AZT)

Əhmədli (Ahmedli) is a village in the Lachin District of Azerbaijan.

== History ==
The village was located in the Armenian-occupied territories surrounding Nagorno-Karabakh, coming under the control of ethnic Armenian forces during the First Nagorno-Karabakh War in the early 1990s. The village subsequently became part of the breakaway Republic of Artsakh as part of its Kashatagh Province, where it was known as Herik (Armenian: Հերիկ). It was returned to Azerbaijan as part of the 2020 Nagorno-Karabakh ceasefire agreement.

== Historical heritage sites ==
Historical heritage sites in and around the village include the 17th-century St. George's Church (Armenian: Սուրբ Գևորգ եկեղեցի, romanized: Surb Gevorg Yekeghetsi).

== Notable people ==
- Nazim Ahmedli (born 1953), the Director of the Literary Literature Affiliate Bureau of the Union of Azerbaijani Writers.
