= United Nations Security Council Resolution 874 =

UN Security Council Resolution 874
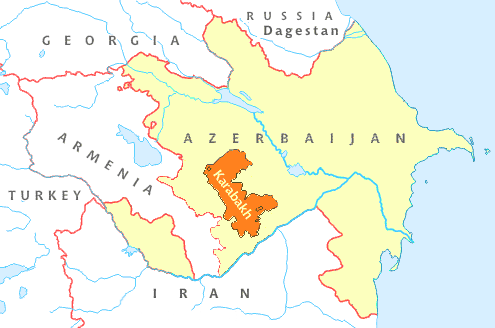
- Region of conflict
- Date: 14 October 1993
- Meeting no.: 3,292
- Code: S/RES/874 (Document)
- Subject: Armenia–Azerbaijan
- Voting summary: 15 voted for; None voted against; None abstained
- Result: Adopted

Security Council composition
- Permanent members: China; France; Russia; United Kingdom; United States
- Non-permanent members: Brazil; Cape Verde; Djibouti; Hungary; Japan; Morocco; New Zealand; Pakistan; Spain; Venezuela

United Nations Security Council resolution 874, adopted unanimously on 14 October 1993, reaffirmed sovereignty and territorial integrity of the Azerbaijani Republic and of all other States in the region, called for the preservation of the ceasefire, cessation of hostilities and withdrawal of forces from recently occupied districts of the Republic of Azerbaijan, and reaffirmed resolutions 822 (1993) and 853 (1993). The Council expressed its concern at "...the conflict in and around the Nagorny Karabakh region of the Azerbaijani Republic, and of the tensions between the Republic of Armenia and the Azerbaijani Republic...", and called upon the parties to observe the ceasefire agreed with by the government of Russia and OSCE Minsk Group.

Resolution 874 is the third document adopted by the UN Security Council on the Karabakh conflict. For the peaceful settlement of the conflict, this document was reaffirmed and referred to in the following years, as were the other UN Security Council resolutions on the matter.

Although the resolution called for a cessation of hostilities, this demand had not been implemented, maintaining Azerbaijani districts under occupation, in a way that non-implementation led the war in 2020.

The council, after reiterating its support for the peace process, called on both sides to accept the OSCE's "Adjusted Timetable of Urgent Steps", which was agreed to by Armenia, rejected by Azerbaijan and the Karabakh authorities delayed responding. The Karabakh authorities adopted a wait-and-see approach, and Azerbaijan rejected it because the "Adjusted Timetable" linked the withdrawal of Karabakh Armenian forces from occupied Azerbaijani territory with the lifting of Azerbaijan's embargo of Armenia. The Azerbaijani government complained of being treated like "the defeated side. The "Adjusted Timetable" included proposals relating to withdrawal of forces from recently occupied territories and the removal of all obstacles to communications and transportation; all other issues not addressed, according to the council, should be settled through peaceful negotiation.

The resolution then called for an early convening of the OSCE Minsk Conference for the purpose of arriving at a negotiated settlement to the conflict, requesting the Secretary-General Boutros Boutros-Ghali to attend the Conference and to provide all possible assistance for the substantive negotiations that would take place. It also called on parties to refrain from violations of international humanitarian law and to allow unimpeded access for international organisations to deliver humanitarian aid.

Resolution 874 was also the first resolution on the topic of the conflict to urge states in the region to refrain from any hostile acts and from any interference or intervention which would lead to the widening of the conflict. At the end of October, fighting broke out at the Azerbaijani-Iranian border, and the subsequent deployment of Iranian forces by Iranian President Akbar Hashemi Rafsanjani about the conflict at its border lead to further calls for states to refrain from interference in Resolution 884.

The current resolution concluded by requesting the secretary-general, the chairman-in-office of the OSCE and the chairman of the OSCE Minsk Conference to continue to report to the council on the progress of the Minsk process and on all aspects of the situation on the ground.

== See also ==
- Armenia–Azerbaijan relations
- List of United Nations Security Council Resolutions 801 to 900 (1993–1994)
- First Nagorno-Karabakh War
- List of United Nations Security Council resolutions on the Nagorno-Karabakh conflict
