= Dardərə =

- Location within Azerbaijan
- Coordinates: 40°27′35″N 46°08′26″E
- Country: Azerbaijan
- Rayon: Dashkasan
- Municipality: Əhmədli
- Time zone: UTC+4 (AZT)
  - Summer (DST): UTC+5 (AZT)

Dardərə (also Dardera and Dardere) is a village in the Dashkasan Rayon of Azerbaijan. The village forms part of the municipality of Əhmədli.
