= United Nations Security Council Resolution 884 =

UN Security Council Resolution 884
- Zəngilan (red) highlighted in Azerbaijan
- Date: 12 November 1993
- Meeting no.: 3,313
- Code: S/RES/884 (Document)
- Subject: Armenia-Azerbaijan
- Voting summary: 15 voted for; None voted against; None abstained
- Result: Adopted

Security Council composition
- Permanent members: China; France; Russia; United Kingdom; United States
- Non-permanent members: Brazil; Cape Verde; Djibouti; Hungary; Japan; Morocco; New Zealand; Pakistan; Spain; Venezuela

United Nations Security Council resolution 884, adopted unanimously on 12 November 1993, after reaffirming resolutions 822 (1993), 853 (1993) and 874 (1993), the Council expressed its concern at the continuing conflict between Armenia and Azerbaijan in Nagorno-Karabakh and condemned violations of the ceasefire between the parties, particularly the occupation of the Zəngilan district and city of Goradiz. Resolution 884 is the fourth and last of the resolutions adopted by the UN Security Council regarding the Nagorno-Karabakh conflict.

== Background ==
The Security Council assessed the situation and on November 12, adopted the resolution 884.

== Text of resolution ==
In paragraphs III-VI, the declaration of the 9 members of the CSCE Minsk Group on 4 November 1993 regarding unilateral ceasefires is evaluated. The resolution then demanded that, from the parties concerned, the immediate cessation of hostilities, the unilateral withdrawal of occupying forces from the Zangelan district and the city of Goradiz, and the withdrawal of occupying forces from other recently occupied areas of Azerbaijan. With regard to the recent violations of the ceasefire, the council urged the parties to observe the ceasefire established from contacts between the Government of Russia and OSCE Minsk Group. It also asked other nations to refrain from interfering in the conflict, particularly as fighting broke out at the Azerbaijani-Iranian border led Iranian troops to be moved to the border region.

Finally, the Council requested the secretary-general and international agencies to provide urgent humanitarian assistance to the affected civilian population particularly with regard to those who were displaced, further urging the Secretary-General Boutros Boutros-Ghali and the OSCE Minsk Group continue to report back on developments to the Council.

== See also ==
- Armenia–Azerbaijan relations
- List of United Nations Security Council Resolutions 801 to 900 (1993–1994)
- First Nagorno-Karabakh War
- List of United Nations Security Council resolutions on the Nagorno-Karabakh conflict
