= Nazim Ahmedli =

Azerbaijani poet and journalist (born 1953)

- Born: May 1, 1953 (age 73); Ahmedli, Lachin Rayon, Azerbaijan SSR, USSR
- Citizenship: USSR; Azerbaijan; Scandinavian countries
- Education: Maxim Gorky Literature Institute
- Children: 2

Nazim Ahmedli (Azerbaijani: Əhmədli Nazim Şamil oğlu; born May 1, 1953) is an Azerbaijani poet and journalist.

== Biography ==
Nazim Shamil oglu Ahmedli was born on May 1, 1953, in Lachin region, Ahmedli village. He graduated from the secondary school in Lachin. In 1971–1974, he studied at Shusha Agriculture Technical School, and in 1974–1976 he served in the military service of the former Soviet Union. From the late 1970s, his poems have been published in the press.

In 1981 he entered the poetry faculty, at Literature Institute named after Maksim Gorky in Moscow. Upon graduation of the Institute, he returned to Baku and worked as a Head Clerk in the Union of Azerbaijani Writers, director of “Natavan” club, Editor-in-chief of the Azerbaijan Literary Translation and Literary Relations Center, and general department manager.

During 1993-1996 he served as a military journalist in the Azerbaijany Army, then worked as a teacher in the Ecology Lyceum in Narimanov district, and later as a teacher of the journalism faculty and deputy dean at the former Applied Science Private University in Baku.

He came to the literature sphere in the 1980s. He is the author of the following books: “A lifetime love”, “My soul will be yours”, “God of Love”, “I am a sinner messenger” poems, “Forgive me” ghazal, “My general” art-documentary story, “The smile of a girl” stories, “Mollaahmedli and people from Mollaahmedli” (artistic publicist, ethnographic).

His poems are regularly published in the republican press and were translated into Russian, Chechen and German languages. N.Ahmedli translated from Russian, Swedish, Japanese literature into our language. He worked as the head of the department at the 525 Newspaper, the Director of the Literary Literature Affiliate Bureau of the Union of Azerbaijani Writers.

He is the Chairman of the Cultural and Scientific Relations with Scandinavian Countries Public Union in the NGO sector since 2012. He has been implementing grant projects in the Scandinavian countries related to Azerbaijan's history, culture, national-moral values and the Karabakh conflict. At present, he works as the Deputy Director of the State Archive of Movie-Photo Documents of the Republic of Azerbaijan. As a military journalist, he was a participant of the first Karabakh war.

== His books ==
1. A lifetime love (poems). Baku, “Writer” Publishing House, 1990.
2. My soul will be yours (poems). Baku, “Adiloglu” Publishing House 2002.
3. My General (art-documentary story). Baku, “Qap Poliqraf” Publishing House, 2002.
4. God of Love (poems). Baku “Adiloglu” Publishing House 2004.
5. Forgive me (ghazal). Baku, “Adiloglu” Publishing House, 2004.
6. Mollaahmedli and people from Mollaahmedli (artistic publicist, ethnographic book). Baku, ”Adiloglu” Publishing House, 2007.
7. I am a sinner messenger (poems). Baku, “Qanun” Publishing House, 2017.
8. The smile of a girl (stories). Baku, “Qanun publishing house”, 2017.
