= Xələc, Salyan =

Xələc
- Municipality
- Location within Azerbaijan
- Coordinates: 39°45′00″N 49°02′28″E
- Country: Azerbaijan
- Rayon: Salyan

Population
  - Total: 3,072
- Time zone: UTC+4 (AZT)
  - Summer (DST): UTC+5 (AZT)

Xələc (also, Israfilbeyli, Khaladzh, and Novo-Khaladzh) is a village and municipality in the Salyan Rayon of Azerbaijan. It has a population of 3,072.
