= Əhmədli, Shamkir =

Municipality in the Shamkir District of Azerbaijan

Coordinates: 40.779°N 45.899°E

Əhmədli (Ahmedli) is a village and the least populous municipality in the Shamkir District of Azerbaijan. It has a population of 92.
