= Parça Xələc =

- Municipality
- Location within Azerbaijan
- Coordinates: 39°43′12″N 48°58′35″E
- Country: Azerbaijan
- Rayon: Salyan

Population
  - Total: 1,440
- Time zone: UTC+4 (AZT)
  - Summer (DST): UTC+5 (AZT)

Parça Xələc (also, Khaladzh and Parchakhaladzh) is a village and municipality in the Salyan Rayon of Azerbaijan. It has a population of 1,440.
