= Xələc, Khizi =

Xələc
- Municipality
- Location within Azerbaijan
- Coordinates: 40°54′52″N 49°02′58″E
- Country: Azerbaijan
- Rayon: Khizi

Population
  - Total: 322
- Time zone: UTC+4 (AZT)
  - Summer (DST): UTC+5 (AZT)

Xələc (also, Xələnc, Khaladzh, and Khalandzh) is a village and municipality in the Khizi Rayon of Azerbaijan. It has a population of 322.
