= Əhmədli, Shamakhi =

Ahmedli
- Municipality
- Azerbaijani: Əhmədli
- Location within Azerbaijan
- Coordinates: 40°44′18″N 48°42′22″E
- Country: Azerbaijan
- District: Shamakhi

Population
  - Total: 502
- Time zone: UTC+4 (AZT)
  - Summer (DST): UTC+5 (AZT)

Əhmədli (Ahmedli) is a village and municipality in the Shamakhi District of Azerbaijan. It has a population of 502.
