= Əhmədli, Masally =

Ahmedli
- Municipality
- Azerbaijani: Əhmədli
- Location within Azerbaijan
- Coordinates: 39°05′34″N 48°40′01″E
- Country: Azerbaijan
- District: Masally

Population
  - Total: 1,372
- Time zone: UTC+4 (AZT)
  - Summer (DST): UTC+5 (AZT)

Əhmədli (Ahmedli) is a village and municipality in the Masally District of Azerbaijan. It has a population of 1,372.
