= Xələc, Qubadli =

Xələc
- Location within Azerbaijan
- Coordinates: 39°21′46″N 46°31′46″E
- Country: Azerbaijan
- District: Qubadli
- Time zone: UTC+4 (AZT)
  - Summer (DST): UTC+5 (AZT)

Xələc (Khalaj) is a village in the Qubadli District of Azerbaijan.
