= Əhmədli, Beylagan =

Ahmedli
- Municipality
- Azerbaijani: Əhmədli
- Location within Azerbaijan
- Coordinates: 39°43′10″N 47°50′14″E
- Country: Azerbaijan
- District: Beylagan

Population
  - Total: 1,348
- Time zone: UTC+4 (AZT)
  - Summer (DST): UTC+5 (AZT)

Əhmədli (Ahmedli) is a village and municipality in the Beylagan District of Azerbaijan. It has a population of 1,348.
