= Əhmədli (40°28′N 46°9′E) =

Ahmedli
- Municipality
- Azerbaijani: Əhmədli
- Location within Azerbaijan
- Coordinates: 40°28′10″N 46°09′06″E
- Country: Azerbaijan
- District: Dashkasan
- Time zone: UTC+4 (AZT)
  - Summer (DST): UTC+5 (AZT)

Əhmədli (Ahmedli) is a village and municipality in the Dashkasan District of Azerbaijan. The municipality consists of the villages of Ahmedli and Dardərə.
