= List of United Nations Security Council resolutions on the Nagorno-Karabakh conflict =

Four UN Security Council Resolutions have been passed during the Nagorno-Karabakh conflict. These resolutions have not invoked Chapter VII of the United Nations Charter.

Azerbaijani and Armenian interpretations of the UNSC Council resolutions differ markedly: Azerbaijan interprets them as confirming Armenia's aggression and Azerbaijan's territorial integrity—without recognizing any self-determination claims by the "local Armenian forces" cited in the texts (UNSC 1993, Resolution 822)—whereas Armenian interpretations highlight those references and the involvement of representatives from the Nagorno-Karabakh Republic in the 1994 ceasefire.

In addition, the resolutions call for a negotiated peace that considers the rights and security of the ethnic Armenian population in Nagorno-Karabakh through the OSCE Minsk Group.

No.	Purpose	Date	Links
822	Demands the immediate end to hostilities and the withdrawal of occupying forces from the Kelbajar district and other recently occupied areas of Azerbaijan. It urges the involved parties to promptly resume negotiations within the Minsk Group peace process framework and avoid actions that could hinder a peaceful resolution. Calls for unimpeded access for international humanitarian aid to affected areas and emphasizes compliance with international humanitarian law.	April 30, 1993	822
853	Demands the immediate cessation of hostilities and the complete, unconditional withdrawal of occupying forces from Agdam and other recently occupied areas of Azerbaijan; Urges all parties to refrain from obstructing peaceful solutions, to engage in negotiations through the Minsk Group and direct contacts, and calls on Armenia to use its influence on the Armenians of Nagorno-Karabakh enclave of Azerbaijan to ensure compliance with the resolution; Calls for unimpeded humanitarian access, the restoration of key infrastructure links, and international support for displaced civilians and humanitarian relief efforts.	July 29, 1993	853
874	Demands the implementation of the Minsk Group's Adjusted Timetable, including the withdrawal of forces from recently occupied territories and the removal of communication and transport obstacles; Urges the parties to make the cease-fire permanent, to accept the timetable, and to resolve remaining issues through peaceful negotiations within the Minsk process; Calls for unimpeded humanitarian access, support for displaced civilians, respect for international humanitarian law, and an early convening of the CSCE Minsk Conference to achieve a negotiated settlement.	October 14, 1993	874
884	Demands the immediate cessation of hostilities and the unilateral withdrawal of occupying forces from the Zangelan district, the city of Goradiz, and other recently occupied areas of Azerbaijan, in line with the adjusted CSCE Minsk timetable; Urges the parties to make the cease-fire effective and permanent, resume negotiations within the Minsk process, and calls on Armenia to ensure compliance by the Armenians of Nagorno-Karabakh with previous resolutions; Calls for urgent humanitarian assistance to civilians, support for displaced persons, and ongoing international monitoring and cooperation to ensure resolution implementation.	November 12, 1993	884

== See also ==
- First Nagorno-Karabakh War
- Second Nagorno-Karabakh War
- Anti-Armenian sentiment
- Anti-Azerbaijani sentiment
- Madrid Principles
- United Nations General Assembly Resolution 62/243
