= United Nations Security Council Resolution 853 =

UN Security Council Resolution 853
- Azerbaijan with the Agdam Rayon highlighted
- Date: 29 July 1993
- Meeting no.: 3,259
- Code: S/RES/853 (Document)
- Subject: Armenia-Azerbaijan
- Voting summary: 15 voted for; None voted against; None abstained
- Result: Adopted

Security Council composition
- Permanent members: China; France; Russia; United Kingdom; United States
- Non-permanent members: Brazil; Cape Verde; Djibouti; Hungary; Japan; Morocco; New Zealand; Pakistan; Spain; Venezuela

In United Nations Security Council resolution 853, adopted unanimously on 29 July 1993, after reaffirming Resolution 822 (1993), the Council expressed its concern at the deteriorating relations between Armenia and Azerbaijan and condemned the seizure of the district of Agdam and other areas of Azerbaijan, demanding a complete withdrawal from the areas by Armenians.

The resolution began by demanding an immediate ceasefire and cessation of hostilities, noting in particular attacks on civilians and bombardments of inhabited areas, urging unimpeded access for international humanitarian relief efforts in the region. It also called for energy, transport and economic links to be restored as part of this process and urging the Secretary-General Boutros Boutros-Ghali and other international organisations to provide assistance to displaced persons.

Regarding efforts to end the conflict, the Council commended the work of the OSCE Minsk Group which was under the leadership of Jan Eliasson, but expressed concern at the disruptive effect the conflict was having on its work. In this regard it urged the parties to refrain from actions that may obstruct a peaceful settlement of the issue and to negotiate within the Minsk Group, welcoming the latter's preparations for a monitoring mission in the region.

The Council asked for the Government of Armenia to exert its influence to achieve compliance by the Armenians of the Nagorno-Karabakh region in Azerbaijan with Resolution 822, the current resolution and proposals by the Minsk Group. It also called for states to refrain from providing any weapons and munitions which might lead to an intensification of the conflict.

Finally, in the second resolution to consider the conflict between Armenia and Azerbaijan, the council requested the secretary-general, in consultation with the chairman-in-office of the CSCE as well as the chairman of the Minsk Group, to continue to update the council on developments in the region.

== See also ==
- 1993 Summer Offensives
- Armenia–Azerbaijan relations
- List of United Nations Security Council Resolutions 801 to 900 (1993–1994)
- First Nagorno-Karabakh War
- List of United Nations Security Council resolutions on the Nagorno-Karabakh conflict
