= United Nations Security Council Resolution 822 =

United Nations Security Council resolution

UN Security Council Resolution 822
- Azerbaijan with the Kalbajar District highlighted in red
- Date: 30 April 1993
- Meeting no.: 3,205
- Code: S/RES/822 (Document)
- Subject: Armenia–Azerbaijan
- Voting summary: 15 voted for; None voted against; None abstained
- Result: Adopted

Security Council composition
- Permanent members: China; France; Russia; United Kingdom; United States
- Non-permanent members: Brazil; Cape Verde; Djibouti; Hungary; Japan; Morocco; New Zealand; Pakistan; Spain; Venezuela

United Nations Security Council resolution 822 was adopted unanimously on 30 April 1993. After expressing concern at the deterioration of relations between Armenia and Azerbaijan, and the subsequent escalation of armed hostilities and deterioration in the humanitarian situation in the region, the Council demanded the immediate cessation of hostilities and the immediate withdrawal of Armenian occupying forces in the Kalbajar district near Nagorno-Karabakh in Azerbaijan.

== Background ==
The First Nagorno-Karabakh War was an ethnic and territorial conflict that took place in the late 1980s to May 1994, in the enclave of Nagorno-Karabakh in southwestern Azerbaijan, between the majority ethnic Armenians of Nagorno-Karabakh backed by the Republic of Armenia, and the Republic of Azerbaijan. As the war progressed, Armenia and Azerbaijan, both former Soviet Republics, entangled themselves in a protracted, undeclared war in the mountainous heights of Karabakh as Azerbaijan attempted to curb the secessionist movement in Nagorno-Karabakh.

By 1992 there was a state of full-scale war between the two now-independent nations. As winter approached, both sides largely abstained from launching full-scale offensives so as to preserve resources, such as gas and electricity, for domestic use. Despite the opening of an economic highway to the residents living in Karabakh, both Armenia and the enclave suffered a great deal due to the economic blockades imposed by Azerbaijan. The 1992–1993 winter was especially cold, as many families throughout Armenia and Karabakh were left without heating and hot water.

In spring 1993 Armenian forces began a new bout of offensives that overran villages in northern Karabakh that had been held by the Azerbaijanis since the previous year. Frustration over these military defeats took a toll on the domestic front in Azerbaijan. Armenia was similarly wracked by political turmoil and growing dissension against President Ter-Petrosyan.

=== Kelbajar ===
Situated west of northern Karabakh, outside the official boundaries of the region, was the rayon of Kelbajar, which bordered Armenia. With a population of about 60,000, the several dozen villages were made up of Azerbaijani and Kurds. In March 1993, the Armenian-held areas near the Sarsang reservoir in Mardakert was reported as coming under attack by the Azerbaijanis. Armenian forces were tasked to capture Kelbajar, where the incursions and artillery shelling were said to have come from.

On 2 April, Armenian forces advanced from two directions toward Kelbajar in an attack that struck Azerbaijani armor and troops entrenched near the Ganje-Kelbjar intersection. Azerbaijani forces were unable to halt Armenian armor and were wiped out. The second attack toward also quickly overran the defenders. By 3 April, Armenian forces were in possession of Kelbajar. Azerbaijani President Elchibey imposed a state of emergency for a period of two months and introduced universal conscription. Human Rights Watch concluded that during the Kelbajar offensive Armenian forces committed numerous violations of the rules of war, including the forcible exodus of a civilian population, indiscriminate fire, and taking of hostages.

== Resolution ==
On 30 April, the United Nations Security Council (UNSC) passed Resolution 822, co-sponsored by Turkey and Pakistan, demanding the immediate cessation of all hostilities and the withdrawal of all occupying forces from Kelbajar. The Council urged the parties concerned to resume negotiations to bring about an end to the conflict within the framework of the peace process proposed by the OSCE Minsk Group, and refraining from any action that would disrupt the process. While it acknowledged Armenian involvement, it did not directly accuse Armenia of aggression.

The resolution then called for unimpeded access for international humanitarian relief efforts in the region to alleviate the suffering of the civilian population by way of humanitarian aid. It also called upon the parties to meet their obligations under international humanitarian law. It concluded by requesting the Secretary-General, in consultation with the Chairman-in-Office of the Organization for Security and Co-operation in Europe and the Chairman of the Minsk Group of the Conference, to assess the situation and report back to the Security Council.

== Aftermath ==
Both sides welcomed the adoption of the resolution. Nevertheless, fighting continued throughout 1993 and into 1994. On 5 May 1994, mutually exhausted, both countries agreed to cease hostilities and to observe a ceasefire that went into effect on 12 May. Sporadic fighting continued in some parts of the region, but the ceasefire was in force until 2020 Nagorno-Karabakh war.

== See also ==
- Armenia–Azerbaijan relations
- List of United Nations Security Council Resolutions 801 to 900 (1993–1994)
- List of United Nations Security Council resolutions on the Nagorno-Karabakh conflict
