= Zangezur corridor =

Geopolitical corridor

- Proposed concession of the United States in Armenia
- Trump Route for International Peace and Prosperity
- Map of the Zangezur corridor: Zangezur corridor Rest of Armenia
- Sovereign state: Armenia
- Armenia–Azerbaijan peace agreement: 8 August 2025

The Zangezur corridor (Note: Zangezur refers to the historical and geographical region in the Caucasus. In Azerbaijan, the variation "Zangazur corridor" is used as well. The concept has also been referred to by press and media as the "Nakhchivan corridor" (Armenian: Նախիջևանի միջանցք; Azerbaijani: Naxçıvan dəhlizi), the "Meghri corridor", (Armenian: Մեղրիի միջանցք; Azerbaijani: Meğri dəhlizi) and the "Syunik corridor" (Armenian: Սյունիքի միջանցք; Azerbaijani: Sünik dəhlizi).) (Armenian: Զանգեզուրի միջանցք, romanized: Zangezuri mijantsk; Azerbaijani: Zəngəzur dəhlizi) is a concept for a transport corridor that emerged after the 2020 Nagorno-Karabakh War, promoted by Azerbaijan and Turkey as a direct land link between mainland Azerbaijan and its Nakhchivan exclave through Armenia's southern Syunik province. This proposed route is often envisioned without Armenian checkpoints. The concept was not part of the 2020 Nagorno-Karabakh ceasefire agreement but was introduced to the geopolitical lexicon later by Azerbaijani President Ilham Aliyev. Armenia has steadily objected to it, asserting that "corridor logic" deviates from the ceasefire terms, and that it is a form of propaganda that threatens Armenian sovereignty.

International perspectives are split; some regard it as a pan-Turkic expansionist project which undermines the safety and security of Armenians; others consider the corridor to be a mechanism for easing the long-standing Turkish-Azeri blockade of Armenia. (Note: The blockade was initiated in 1989 by Azerbaijan, originally in response to the Karabakh movement which called for the independence of Nagorno-Karabakh (Artsakh) from Azerbaijan and its reunification with Armenia. Turkey later joined the blockade against Armenia in 1993.)

Historically, the Armenian region of Syunik/Zangezur has been contested by Azerbaijan and Turkey following the collapse of the Russian Empire in 1918. Since 2021, Azerbaijan has occupied sections of internationally recognized Armenian territory, especially in Syunik. Soviet-era railway connections once linked Nakhchivan to Azerbaijan through Armenia, but these were severed during the Karabakh Movement in the early 1990s. Past proposals—including land swaps in the 1990s and early 2000s—failed due to strong domestic opposition in both countries. The dispute intensified in 2021 when Azerbaijani President Ilham Aliyev claimed Armenia had agreed to the corridor and threatened to establish it by military force. Rather than conceding an extraterritorial corridor that threatens its sovereignty, Armenia instead calls for multiple routes to be opened simultaneously as part of the Crossroads of Peace initiative. Russia has at times downplayed the "corridor" terminology, framing discussions around general transport reopening, but later signaled support for the plan.

A shift occurred with the 2025 U.S.-brokered Trump Route for International Peace and Prosperity (TRIPP), which grants the U.S. exclusive development rights to operate a corridor on commercial terms. This U.S.-brokered project is branded as part of the Armenia–Azerbaijan peace agreement and aims to reduce Russian, Iranian, and Chinese influence in the South Caucasus. Iran and Russia have condemned the role of the United States as an encroachment.

== Historical context ==
Armenia and Azerbaijan

Since the early 20th century, Azerbaijan and Turkey have aimed to possess a continuous land corridor between the two countries, with Armenia resisting. The shortest land corridor between Turkey and Azerbaijan is through the Armenian province of Syunik/Zangezur.

Armenia’s defeat in the Second Nagorno-Karabakh War (2020) resulted in various concessions being given to Azerbaijan. In addition, Azerbaijan engaged in a 10-month-long military siege and offensive to reincorporate Nagorno-Karabakh into Azerbaijan, resulting in the flight of the entire population to Armenia proper. Since 2020, Azerbaijan has escalated its expansionist rhetoric, and occupied internationally recognized Armenian territory, openly threatening further seizures to force the creation of the Zangezur corridor.

=== Collapse of the Russian empire ===
Zangezur was the name of a district created by the Russian Empire in 1868 as part of the Yelizavetpol governorate, covering an area including what is today the southern part of Armenia. Syunik, the Armenian name, is an older term dating back to antiquity (see also; the historical province of Syunik . The territory was disputed between the first republics of Armenia and Azerbaijan between 1918 and 1920, following the collapse of the Russian empire. In January 1919, Britain approved Azerbaijani jurisdiction over the territory but Armenian resistance outlasted military pressure until both republics were incorporated into the Soviet Union.

=== Soviet period and Nagorno-Karabakh conflict ===
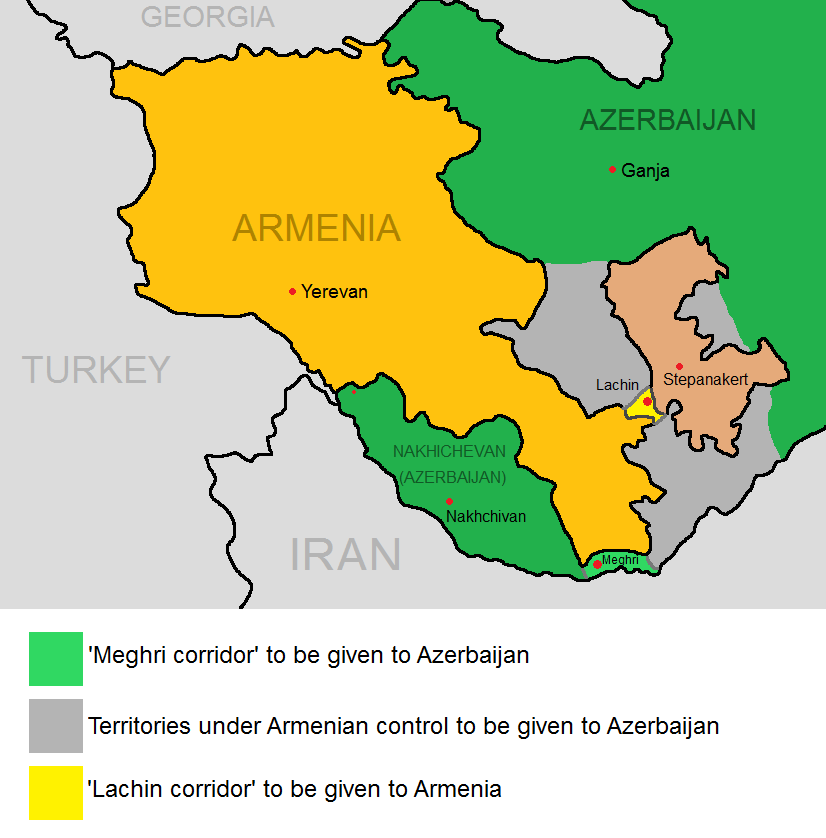
The map of the Azerbaijan's territorial exchange proposal made to Armenia in 2002. In light green at the bottom of Armenia's Syunik province is the proposed "Meghri corridor", which was meant to connect mainland Azerbaijan with Nakhichevan.

In Soviet times, two railway connections used to link Nakhichevan ASSR with the main territory of Azerbaijan SSR. The shorter line that passed via Syunik region (the southernmost Armenian province), was built earlier, in 1941, whereas the Yerevan-Ijevan-Qazax line further to the North, was constructed in the 1980s as an alternative route, connecting Yerevan to Baku and Russia. Both lines were abandoned since 1992 due to the Nagorno-Karabakh conflict.

In 1989 Azerbaijan launched a blockade of Armenia in an attempt to curb the Karabakh movement which called for independence from Azerbaijan and reunification with Armenia. Turkey later joined the blockade against Armenia in 1993. The blockade is an ongoing transportation and economic embargo which has significantly impacted the economy and the regional trade dynamics of the Caucasus. In 1992, Turkey advocated the "double-corridor concept" firstly introduced by Paul A. Goble, which proposed territorial swap between Armenia and Azerbaijan. According to the proposal Azerbaijan would relinquish Nagorno-Karabakh, which would be linked to Armenia. In exchange, Armenia would concede the southern Zangezur corridor to Azerbaijan, thereby providing a direct land corridor between Azerbaijan and Nakhichevan.

In 2001 and 2002, Azerbaijan and Armenia discussed an agreement on a "land swap" peace proposal in which Azerbaijan would cede sovereignty over Nagorno-Karabakh (including the Lachin corridor, which linked southern Armenia to Artsakh, and was de facto under the control of the Artsakh Defence Army but de jure in Azerbaijan at that point) to Armenia in exchange for Armenia ceding sovereignty over the Meghri corridor to Azerbaijan. However, the resistance in both states was strong against the territorial swap, and so the plan did not work.

=== 2020 ceasefire agreement ===
Re-establishment of transport connections was envisaged by article 9 of the ceasefire agreement signed on November 9, 2020 at the end of Second Nagorno-Karabakh War which stated:

All economic and transport connections in the region shall be unblocked. The Republic of Armenia shall guarantee the security of transport connections between the western regions of the Republic of Azerbaijan and the Nakhchivan Autonomous Republic in order to arrange unobstructed movement of persons, vehicles and cargo in both directions. The Border Guard Service of the Russian Federal Security Service shall be responsible for overseeing the transport connections.

In December 2020, Russia signalled its desire to connect Nakhichevan to the rest of Azerbaijan through a railway link that would go through Armenia. Azerbaijan, Armenia and Russia created a trilateral working group in order to unblock communications in the region. Russian foreign minister Sergei Lavrov said that the activity of this group will serve the implementation of confidence-building measures and resolution of humanitarian problems, and that the interests of Turkey and Iran are taken into account during trilateral consultations.

On 31 December 2020, Azerbaijani President Ilham Aliyev announced plans to build a railroad line from Horadiz to Zangilan, from where it would use trucks to move goods to Nakhchivan and Turkey, suggesting a potential future transport link between Zangilan and Nakhchivan through Syunik. According to Aliyev, the "corridor" could eventually become a part of the International North–South Transport Corridor, connecting Iran to Russia via Azerbaijan and Armenia, while Armenia would get a railway link to Russia, Iran and potentially to Turkey.

On 14 January 2022, Prime Minister Nikol Pashinyan set up a working group for reconstruction of the Yeraskh to Nakhichevan border and Meghri sections of the Armenian railways. Adviser to the Prime Minister Artashes Tumanyan was appointed the head of the working group.

== 2021 "Zangezur corridor" dispute ==
In January 2021 trilateral meeting of Russian, Azerbaijani and Armenian leaders, Russian President Vladimir Putin emphasized the issue of opening economic, commercial and transportation links and borders, announcing that a joint working group under the chairmanship of the deputy prime ministers of these countries is formed to work on it.

In February 2021, a dispute arose around a clause in the 2020 Nagorno-Karabakh ceasefire agreement that provided for unblocking all economic and transport connections in the region, including that between the western regions of Azerbaijan and the Nakhchivan Autonomous Republic. Azerbaijani President Ilham Aliyev declared that the ceasefire agreement contained a special provision on the establishment of a so-called "Nakhichevan corridor". The Armenian government and Armenian opposition parties rejected this claim emphasizing that the ceasefire agreement did not contain any provisions for establishing such "corridor".

In April 2021, Aliyev announced that Azerbaijani people would return to what he described as "West Zangezur" and Azerbaijan's "historic lands" within the borders of Armenia, but that Azerbaijan does not have territorial claims to any foreign country. However, a week later, he warned that Azerbaijan would establish the "Zangezur corridor" by force if Armenia would not accede to the creation of the corridor. The Armenian foreign ministry responded that the country would "take all necessary measures to defend its sovereignty and territorial integrity." In May 2021, Armenian Prime Minister Nikol Pashinyan said that while Armenia is not willing to discuss 'corridor logic', it is keen on opening transport links as means of direct railway communication with Iran and Russia. The dispute has been cited as one of the reasons for the 2021 Armenia–Azerbaijan border crisis.

A new round of trilateral talks began on 20 October 2021. A day earlier, Armenian Deputy Prime Minister Mher Grigoryan said that progress was made toward the railway connections dating from the Soviet period being restored. A day after the talks had begun, Aliyev was quoted as saying that the Armenian side has agreed to the "Zangezur corridor".

On 9 November 2021, the Deputy Prime Minister of Russia and the co-chair of the trilateral task force dealing with cross-border connections Alexei Overchuk said that "Armenia and Azerbaijan will retain sovereignty over roads passing through their territory". The Russian Foreign Ministry confirmed this, commenting on the media speculation about the "so-called Zangezur corridor". The chairman of Azerbaijan's Center of Analysis of International Relations Farid Shafiyev said that if Armenia does not want to say "corridor", then an alternative term can be used, but insisted that unimpeded access for unimpeded movement to Nakhchivan must be given without any Armenian checkpoints, with the security of transport links provided only by the Russian border guards. According to Anar Valiyev, the dean of the Azerbaijan Diplomatic Academy, “What Azerbaijan wants is no checkpoints, not to have to stop at the border...We are in a situation where we have leverage, we have time and we can dictate terms.”

On 15 December 2021, in Brussels, during a press conference with NATO Secretary General Jens Stoltenberg, Aliyev expressed a view that the "Zangezur corridor" should function as the Lachin corridor. During this, he said that the opening of the Zangezur corridor "is provisioned in the 10 November 2020 ceasefire agreement", adding that just as Azerbaijan assures security and entry to Lachin corridor, Armenia should provide the same unhampered entrance to the Zangezur corridor, without customs enforcement, and threatening that "if Armenia insists on customs points to control the movement of goods and people over the Zangezur Corridor, then [Azerbaijan] will insist on the same conditions in the Lachin corridor". In response to this, Pashinyan said that "Azerbaijan is trying to take the process of unblocking the regional connections to a deadlock" and that "the parallels made to the Lachin corridor do not have even the slightest connection to discussions and announcements signed to this date, and are unacceptable to Armenia".

=== As a pan-Turkic agenda ===
Azerbaijan and Turkey promote their vision of "Zangezur corridor" as a means of "uniting the Turkic world".

Azeri President Aliyev has said multiple times that the corridor will "unite the whole Turkic world." Turkey has long sought to establish a direct land corridor to Azerbaijan, with numerous sources stating that this ambition was a driving factor behind the Armenian Genocide, as the Armenian population stood geographically in the way. Genocide Watch characterizes the corridor as a pan-Turkic project which "will cost thousands of Armenian lives." The Lemkin Institute for Genocide Prevention has criticized the international community for not adequately addressing the situation and has stated that the seizure of Armenia's Syunik region would "realize the pan-Turkic dream that fueled the Armenian Genocide" adding that Azerbaijan's "actions extend far beyond mere territorial disputes, touching upon the very existence of Armenia and Armenians in what is left of their ancestral homeland."

Ahmad Kazemi, academic on Eurasian issues, asserts that Azerbaijan is using the pretext of creating connectivity in the region to establish "the so-called pan-Turkic illusionary Zangezur corridor" which he argues is "not compatible with any of the present geopolitical and historical realities of the region."

Since the end of the Second Nagorno-Karabakh War, Azerbaijan has increasingly promoted expansionist and irredentist claims to Armenian territory. These include referring to Armenia as "Western Azerbaijan." Additionally, in 2022 pro-government media and Azerbaijani officials briefly promoted the irredentist concept of the “Goycha-Zangazur Republic” which claims all of southern Armenia. Azerbaijani parliamentarian Hikmat Babaoghlu criticized the idea, stating that it weakens Azerbaijan's public case to create the Zangezur corridor.

=== As a solution to the blockade ===
Rather than building a transport route between Azerbaijan and its exclave Nakhchivan in isolation, Armenia has instead called for multiple routes to be opened simultaneously, that directly connect it to both Turkey and Azerbaijan, thereby ending the ongoing mutual blockade that has existed since 1989.

In the opinion of Thomas de Waal, a former journalist and a senior fellow with Carnegie Europe, "The economic benefits of the opening of closed transport routes in the South Caucasus, including as set out in the November 2020 ceasefire agreement between Armenia and Azerbaijan, could extend to all the countries of the region as well as to Russia, Turkey, and Iran. But the politics remains difficult within the region and between its neighbouring powers, with trust in short supply." According to de Waal, "Security concerns also haunt plans to reopen the crucial transport route across southern Armenia to and from Azerbaijan's exclave of Nakhchivan. Azerbaijan and Turkey are already connected by road through the Baku–Tbilisi–Kars railway across Georgia. A new route via southern Armenia would have the important result of de-isolating Nakhchivan and lifting its economy. Beyond that, this route would acquire more significance only if traffic across it is subjected to minimal checks and controls; Armenia for its part insists that it does not want a "corridor" across its territory over which it has no control, and it is supported in this stance by Iran."

Michael Rubin, a senior scholar at the right-leaning think tank American Enterprise Institute (AEI), wrote that Turkey and Azerbaijan presidents are trying to redefine the clause on unblocking regional communications in trilateral ceasefire agreement by interpreting it as granting them a corridor bisecting sovereign Armenian territory and ignoring the first sentence in the clause about unblocking economic and transport connections across the region. Rubin called this reinterpretation unwarranted and illegitimate, arguing that the removing the double blockade of Armenia in order to reduce Armenian dependence upon Russia and Iran would be the best way forward from the situation. According to him, "while Turkey hopes its trucks could drive through Zangezur to Armenia, Armenian vehicles should likewise be able to drive from Yerevan to Istanbul. If Turks hope to enjoy unhampered trade with Central Asia all the way to the Chinese border, then Armenians in Artsakh should enjoy the same unhampered trade through Turkey all the way to France or the UK".

According to Stephen Blank, Senior Fellow at Foreign Policy Research Institute's Eurasia Program, the Zangezur Corridor stands out as the optimal way to bypass Russia's "blockade of global supply routes"; Armenia's acceptance would also re-affirm its commitment to partnership with the West.

=== Russian interests ===
The international relations scholars Javad Heiran-Nia and Mahmood Monshipouri opine that Russia aims to solidify access to the markets of the Middle East through the supposed Zangezur corridor. According to Heiran-Nia and Monshipouri, this would complement Russia's goal of dominating the communication routes that stretch from Dagestan to Zangezur, and also from the border where Nakhchivan and Armenia meet, to Armenia's border with Turkey. In the opinion of Heiran-Nia and Monshipouri, Russia would thereby benefit as much as Azerbaijan and Turkey if the Zangezur corridor were to be implemented. The implementation of the Zangezur corridor would be thus part of Moscow's long-term plans aimed at securing favorable alliances that guarantee its influence in the region, to set up vassal or puppet states that are key to conserving Russian long-term interests, and to solidify its influence over territory outside the reach of a potential NATO incursion.

=== International reaction ===
- European Union — A joint statement by the European Parliament DSCA Chair Marina Kaljurand and Standing Rapporteurs on Armenia, Andrey Kovatchev, and Azerbaijan, Željana Zovko, among other things, condemned the statements made by the Azerbaijani side: "To de-escalate the situation, it is of utmost importance that inflammatory rhetoric ceases immediately. In this context, we condemn in particular recent statements by Azerbaijani representatives regarding so-called 'West Zangezur' and referring to the territory of the Republic of Armenia as Azerbaijani 'ancestral land'. Such statements are highly irresponsible and threaten to undermine regional security further." On 31 May 2022, Barend Leyts, the spokesperson for the European Council President Charles Michel wrote that "connectivity was specifically discussed in Brussels on 22 May to advance opportunities for unblocking the region. In this context, both parties confirmed there were no extraterritorial claims with regard to future transport infrastructure. Speculation to the contrary is regrettable." This statement came a week after Ilham Aliyev's statement about "Zangezur Corridor" where he made references to Charles Michel's announcement post trilateral meeting with Armenian and Azerbaijani presidents.
- France — The Ambassador to Armenia Jonathan Lacôte objected to the use of "corridor" expression, because in his opinion the "corridors" have left a very bad memory in the history of diplomacy, such as the Polish Danzig Corridor, which was central to Nazi policy and served as a pretext to World War II.
- Turkey — The Shusha Declaration signed by presidents of Azerbaijan and Turkey on 15 June 2021 included a passage on the "Zangezur corridor", and both Aliyev and Erdogan stressed the importance of its implementation in the following joint press conference. The Ministry of Foreign Affairs of Armenia condemned their joint visit to Shusha, calling it a provocation.
- Russia — Vice prime minister Overchuk attested in September 2021 that the trilateral group, which Russia is part of, discusses unblocking regional communications but not creating a "corridor". In 2024, Russia backed the Zangezur corridor plan.
- Lemkin Institute for Genocide Prevention — issued a "red flag" genocide alert on Azerbaijan: "Observers should expect any genocide against Armenians in Artsakh to be accompanied or followed by aggressions against Armenia proper, particularly the southern Syunik region where Azerbaijan and Turkey would like to build a "Zangezur corridor" linking the two countries and excluding Armenians. This corridor would cut Armenia off from its southern border, further weakening its geopolitical position and rendering it even more vulnerable to attacks from its hostile neighbors." The group also said the corridor is "illegal" and "would effectively constitute an occupation of Armenian land"

== Trump Route for International Peace and Prosperity (2025) ==
In August 2025, the United States hosted the signing ceremony for a strategic transit corridor agreement between Armenia and Azerbaijan at the White House. The event was attended by US president Donald Trump, Armenian prime minister Nikol Pashinyan, and Azerbaijani president Ilham Aliyev. The deal includes an agreement that the countries will cooperate on a new transit corridor linking Azerbaijan to Nakhchivan in Armenia. The route will be named the Trump Route for International Peace and Prosperity (TRIPP) and the development rights to the project are guaranteed to the United States for 49 years. Under the agreement, the US would sublease the land to a consortium that will develop rail, oil, gas, and fiber optic lines, as well as possibly electricity transmission, along the 43-kilometre (27 mi) corridor. The US will hold a 74% stake in the venture company, with Armenia possessing the remaining share.

The 2025 agreement was mediated by Trump's Special Envoy Steve Witkoff, who visited the region in late February. It was followed by a series of five additional visits by U.S. representatives. U.S. Senator Steve Daines participated in the visit to the both countries in May.

After the agreement was signed, the U.S. administration received calls from three American companies who are interested in operation of the route.

According to Nikol Pashinyan, the project originates from the Crossroads of Peace initiative, which is supported by a bilateral memorandum between Armenia and the U.S. aimed at fostering development and investment.

=== Key features of the TRIPP ===
==== Purpose and connectivity ====
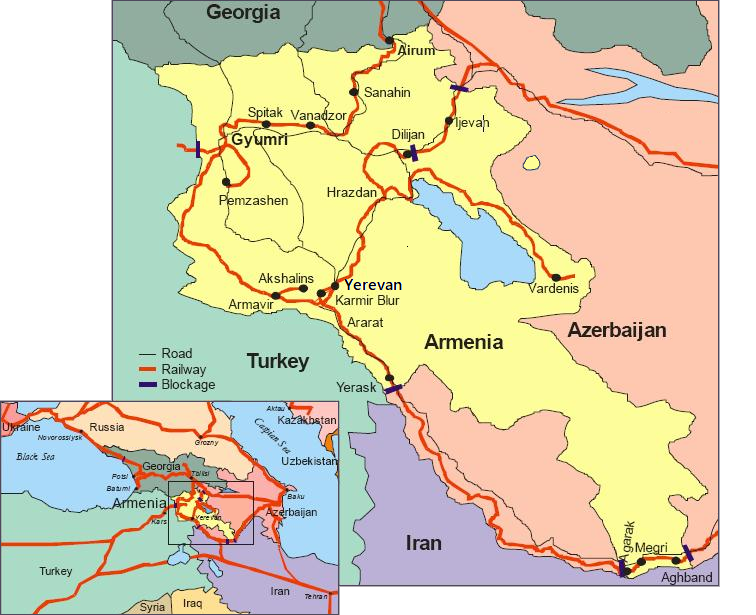
Railroad map of the region. The currently blocked line in the south of Armenia connects Azerbaijan and its Nakhchivan exclave.

The corridor links mainland Azerbaijan to its Nakhchivan exclave, which is separated by a 32 km (20 mi) stretch of Armenian territory, while maintaining sovereignty of Armenia over the territory. The route will be operated according to Armenian law and the United States will sublease the land to a consortium for infrastructure and management for up to 99 years.

It will facilitate trade, energy transit, and regional connectivity, including rail lines, oil/gas pipelines, fiber optic cables, and roadways.

==== U.S. involvement ====
The U.S. does not provide any "hard security guarantees" for the parties, and instead is aiming to operate the corridor on commercial principles. The U.S. secured exclusive development rights for the corridor, leasing the land to a consortium of private companies for construction and management. Nine firms (including three U.S.-based operators) have already expressed interest in developing the infrastructure.

==== Geopolitical significance ====
The deal reduces Russian influence in the South Caucasus, as Armenia has shifted toward Western partnerships following Azerbaijan's 2023 military recapture of Nagorno-Karabakh. It strengthens US economic and strategic ties in the region while sidelining the OSCE Minsk Group (a Russia-led mediation body, which was formally closed on 1 September 2025). With it, the US replaces Russia as the main mediator in the region.

A US official told Axios that the main goal of the United States in this development project is to reduce the influence of Iran, Russia, and China in the South Caucasus region. The corridor would allow people and goods to travel between Turkey and Azerbaijan and beyond to Central Asia without passing through Iran or Russia.

South Caucasus Pipeline for natural gas, connecting Azerbaijan and Turkey

According to U.S. Senator Steve Daines, the deal will allow energy and mineral exports from the region, bypassing Russia and China.

The corridor allows Azerbaijan to establish a transport link to its exclave Nakhchivan. Since 2021, Azerbaijan has built transportation infrastructure, including roads, railways, airports, and pipelines as part of its envisioned "Zangezur corridor" project.

According to Pashinyan, the deal "unblocks" Armenia from the Turkish-Azeri blockade against Armenia.

==== Symbolism and controversy ====
Named after Trump as a diplomatic gesture (reportedly proposed by Armenia), the corridor aligns with Trump's branding as a global peacemaker and his aspirations for a Nobel Peace Prize.

Critics, however, question Armenia's sovereignty concessions and Azerbaijan's authoritarian leadership.

==== Broader implications ====
The corridor is expected to unlock billions in regional trade, integrate Armenia into global supply chains, and potentially reshape geopolitics by connecting Turkey, Azerbaijan, and Central Asia more closely with Western markets.

=== Reactions ===
- Armenia: According to Prime Minister Nikol Pashinyan, "TRIPP will open strategic economic opportunities that will bring long-term benefits, promote infrastructure investments, stimulate regional connectivity and strengthen the US leadership as a key actor in conflict resolution".
- Azerbaijan: According to President Ilham Aliyev, "[the agreement] will result in peace—long-lasting peace, eternal peace in the Caucasus".
- Iran: Ali Akbar Velayati, a top adviser to Iran's Supreme Leader, criticized the project, claiming that its intent is to "sever Iran's link with the Caucasus and impose a land blockade on Iran and Russia". He added: This corridor will not become a passage owned by Trump, but rather a graveyard for Trump's mercenaries.
- Russia: the Russian Foreign Ministry criticized the project, saying that it is part of the West's continuing efforts to sideline Russia and Iran.
- Turkey: the Turkish Foreign Ministry welcomed the agreement, calling it "an extremely important development in terms of ensuring regional peace and stability".
- United States: According to President Donald Trump, the agreement will "economically benefit all three of our nations".

== See also ==
- Abraham Accords
- Crossroads of Peace
