= Armenia–Azerbaijan peace agreement =

2025 agreement to end the Nagorno-Karabakh conflict

Armenia–Azerbaijan peace deal
On the Establishment of Peace and Interstate Relations between the Republic of Armenia and the Republic of Azerbaijan
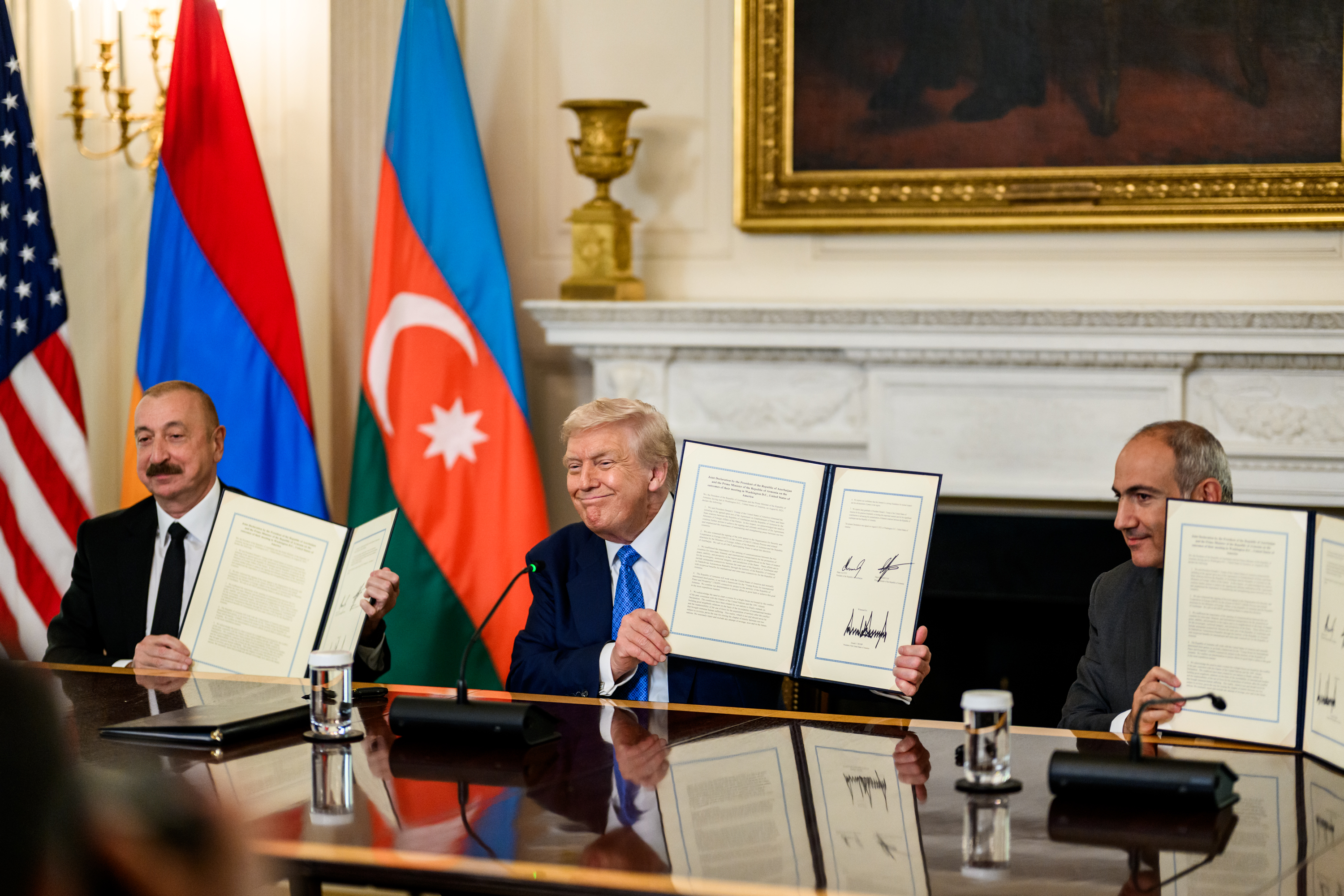
- Left to right: President Ilham Aliyev of Azerbaijan, US president Donald Trump, and Prime Minister Nikol Pashinyan of Armenia signing a trilateral joint declaration
- Signed: 8 August 2025 (initialed)
- Location: White House, Washington, DC, United States
- Mediators: Donald Trump (witness)
- Negotiators: Nikol Pashinyan; Ilham Aliyev
- Parties: Armenia; Azerbaijan
- Language: English

The Armenia–Azerbaijan peace deal, (Note: Armenian: Հայաստանի և Ադրբեջանի միջև խաղաղության համաձայնագիր, romanized: Hayastani yev Adrbejani mijev khaghaghut'yan hamadzaynagir; Azerbaijani: Azərbaycan–Ermənistan sülh müqaviləsi) officially titled the Agreement "On the Establishment of Peace and Interstate Relations between the Republic of Armenia and the Republic of Azerbaijan", (Note: Armenian: Հայաստանի Հանրապետության և Ադրբեջանի Հանրապետության միջև խաղաղության և միջպետական հարաբերությունների հաստատման մասին համաձայնագիր, romanized: Hayastani Hanrapetut'yan yev Adrbejani Hanrapetut'yan mijev khaghaghut'yan yev mijpetakan haraberutyunneri hastatman masin hamadzaynagir; Azerbaijani: Azərbaycan Respublikası və Ermənistan Respublikası arasında sülhün və dövlətlərarası münasibətlərin təsis) aims to end the ongoing Nagorno-Karabakh conflict between Armenia and Azerbaijan. On 8 August 2025, Armenian prime minister Nikol Pashinyan and Azerbaijani president Ilham Aliyev, with the mediation of United States president Donald Trump, initialed an agreement and signed a joint declaration emphasizing the need to continue efforts toward the signing and final ratification of the agreement.

One concession made by Armenia is the withdrawal of Russian defensive forces from the Armenia-Azerbaijani border.

Another key part of the agreement is the construction of a route (described as the "Zangezur corridor" by Turkish and Azerbaijani sources) linking mainland Azerbaijan to its Nakhchivan Autonomous Republic, which is separated by a 32 km (20 mi) stretch of Armenian territory. The route will remain a part of Armenian territory and be operated according to Armenian law, but the United States will have exclusive rights to develop the area for 99 years. Because of US president Donald Trump's role in brokering the agreement, the route has been named the Trump Route for International Peace and Prosperity (TRIPP). Currently, due to the ongoing Turkish–Azeri blockade of Armenia, direct transit through the region is hampered. In addition to the immediate goal, the completion of the route would allow the passage of people and goods from Europe to Azerbaijan and the broader Central Asia without needing to travel through Russia or Iran. Iran and Russia have condemned the role of the United States in the proposed TRIPP project as an encroachment.

Observers in Iran and Russia have condemned the corridor as U.S. encroachment. Armenian observers have condemned the peace deal as a legitimization of Azerbaijan's aggression and expansionist ambitions against Armenians in Armenia and Nagorno-Karabakh.

== Background ==
The Nagorno-Karabakh conflict began in 1988 when ethnic Armenians demanded the transfer of the NKAO region to Armenia. As the war progressed, Armenia and Azerbaijan, then both former Soviet Republics, entangled themselves in a protracted, undeclared war in the mountainous heights of Karabakh as Azerbaijan attempted to curb the secessionist movement in Nagorno-Karabakh. On 20 February 1988, the enclave's parliament voted in favour of uniting with Armenia. As the Soviet Union's dissolution neared, the tensions gradually grew into an increasingly violent conflict between ethnic Armenians and ethnic Azerbaijanis. Both sides made claims of ethnic cleansing and pogroms conducted by the other.

As Azerbaijan declared its independence from the Soviet Union and removed the powers held by the enclave's government, the Armenian majority voted to secede from Azerbaijan. The referendum held in 1991 was boycotted by the Azerbaijani population and had an electorate turnout of 82.1%, of which 99.9% voted in favour of independence. The referendum resulted in the unrecognized Republic of Nagorno-Karabakh.

Full-scale fighting erupted in the late winter of 1992. International mediation by several groups, including the Organization for Security and Co-operation in Europe (OSCE), failed to bring resolution. In the spring of 1993, Armenian forces captured territory outside the enclave itself, threatening to catalyze the involvement of other countries in the region. By the end of the war in 1994, the Armenians were in full control of most of the enclave and also held and currently control approximately 9% of Azerbaijan's territory outside the enclave. An estimated 353,000 Armenians from Azerbaijan and 500,000 Azerbaijanis from Armenia and Karabakh were displaced as a result of the conflict. A Russian-brokered ceasefire was signed in May 1994, leading to diplomatic mediation.

Border clashes continued in the following years, eventually escalating to the 2008 Mardakert clashes, which began on 4 March after the 2008 Armenian election protests, resulting in several score wounded and killed, with both sides declaring victory. It was the heaviest fighting between ethnic Armenian and Azerbaijani forces since the 1994 ceasefire after the First Nagorno-Karabakh War. Following the incident, on 14 March the United Nations General Assembly by a recorded vote of 39 in favour to 7 against adopted Resolution 62/243, demanding the immediate withdrawal of all Armenian forces from the occupied territories of Azerbaijan. The 2010 Nagorno-Karabakh clash was a scattered exchange of gunfire that took place on 18 February on the line of contact dividing Azerbaijani and the Karabakh Armenian military forces. As a result, three Azerbaijani soldiers were killed and one wounded. The 2010 Mardakert clashes were the deadliest for Armenian forces since the 2008 violence. Between 2008 and 2010, 74 soldiers were killed on both sides.

A four-day escalation in April 2016 resulted in hundreds of casualties but only minor changes to the front line. In late 2020, the large-scale Second Nagorno-Karabakh War resulted in thousands of casualties and a significant Azerbaijani victory. An armistice was established by a tripartite ceasefire agreement on 10 November, resulting in Azerbaijan regaining all of the occupied territories surrounding Nagorno-Karabakh as well as capturing one-third of Nagorno-Karabakh itself. Ceasefire violations in Nagorno-Karabakh and on the Armenian–Azerbaijani border continued following the 2020 war.

Azerbaijan regained control over the disputed territory and surrounding regions in 2020 and 2023.

In October 2022, the European Union announced a civilian mission to Armenia to assist with border delimitation between Armenia and Azerbaijan. This mission aimed to support peaceful negotiations, provide technical help in marking the borders, and promote stability in the region amid renewed tensions.

On 13 March 2025, it was announced that both parties had agreed on all terms of the peace agreement. The announcement was described as "historic" by US Secretary of State Marco Rubio, while European Union High Representative Kaja Kallas referred to it as "a decisive step."

According to political analyst Thomas de Waal, the progress towards the agreement is largely attributed to Armenian prime minister Nikol Pashinyan, who has made a series of concessions in an effort to reach a deal. De Waal also noted that Azerbaijani president Ilham Aliyev rarely emphasizes the benefits of peace, and continues to use the conflict with Armenia as a means to consolidate his leadership within the country.

== Geopolitical significance ==
South Caucasus Pipeline for natural gas, connecting Azerbaijan and Turkey

The strategic transit route between Armenia and Azerbaijan is planned to be named the Trump Route for International Peace and Prosperity, or TRIPP, and the development rights to the project are guaranteed to the United States for 99 years. Under the agreement, the US would sublease the land to a consortium that will develop rail, oil, gas, and fiber optic lines, as well as possibly electricity transmission, along the 43-kilometre (27 mi) route.

The deal reduces Russian influence in the South Caucasus, as Armenia has shifted toward Western partnerships following Azerbaijan's 2023 military recapture of Nagorno-Karabakh. It strengthens US economic and strategic ties in the region while sidelining the OSCE Minsk Group (a Russia-led mediation body now deemed obsolete). With it, the US replaces Russia as the main mediator in the region.

A US official told Axios that the main goal of the United States in this development project is to reduce the influence of Iran, Russia, and China in the South Caucasus region. The route would allow people and goods to travel between Turkey and Azerbaijan and beyond to Central Asia without passing through Iran or Russia.

According to US Senator Steve Daines, the deal will allow energy and mineral exports from the region, bypassing Russia and China.

In the meantime, Iran threatened to block the planned route, citing security concerns, despite earlier welcoming the broader peace agreement between Armenia and Azerbaijan.

== Reactions ==
The European Union, NATO, and the Council of Europe welcomed the signing of the peace agreement between Armenia and Azerbaijan. Iran and Russia have condemned the role of the United States in the proposed Zangezur corridor as an encroachment. Observers have also criticized the peace deal for not addressing the right of return for ethnic Armenians who fled from Nagorno-Karabakh as a result of Azerbaijan's 9-month-long military siege and offensive. Aram Hamparian, executive director of the Armenian National Committee of America, stated that "normalizing ethnic cleansing is not peace" and considered the agreement to be predicated on the erasure of Nagorno-Karabakh, the abandonment of holy sites, the neglect of hostages, and the entrenchment of Azerbaijani occupation.

Armenian sources have also criticized the peace agreement for not addressing Azerbaijan's expansionist project of "Western Azerbaijan" which claims all of Armenia.
