= 1988 Armenian earthquake =

Devastating earthquake in Armenian SSR, USSR

- UTC time: 1988-12-07 07:41:27
- ISC event: 417441
- USGS-ANSS: ComCat
- Local date: 7 December 1988
- Local time: 11:41:27 AMT
- Duration: < 20 seconds
- Magnitude: 6.8 M_{s}
- Depth: 5 km (3.1 mi)
- Epicenter: 40.987°N 44.185°E; Nalband, Armenian SSR, Soviet Union (present-day Shirakamut, Lori Province, Armenia)
- Type: Thrust
- Areas affected: Soviet Union
- Total damage: US$16.2 billion (equivalent to $44.1 billion in 2025)
- Max. intensity: MMI X (Extreme); MSK-64 X (Devastating)
- Peak acceleration: 0.6–0.7 g at Spitak (est)
- Aftershocks: 5.8 M_{L} December 7 at 11:45 AMT
- Casualties: 25,000 dead (official figure); 30,000–40,000 dead (estimates) 31,000–130,000 injured

An earthquake occurred in northern Armenia (then Armenian SSR, as part of the Soviet Union) on 7 December, 1988, at 11:41 local time with a surface-wave magnitude of 6.8 and a maximum MSK intensity of X (Devastating). The region is vulnerable to large and destructive earthquakes and is part of a larger active seismic belt that stretches from the Alps to the Himalayas. Activity in the area is associated with tectonic plate boundary interaction and the source of the event was slip on a thrust fault just to the north of Spitak. The complex incident ruptured multiple faults, with a strike-slip event occurring shortly after the initiation of the mainshock. Between 25,000 and 50,000 people were killed and up to 130,000 were injured.

Seismologists thoroughly studied the effects of the Spitak event, including the mainshock and aftershock fault rupture mechanisms, and were on site setting up temporary seismometers before the end of 1988. Earthquake engineering experts scrutinized building construction styles and found fault in the poorly constructed apartments and other buildings that were built during the Era of Stagnation under the rule of Leonid Brezhnev. The cities of Spitak, Leninakan (Gyumri) and Kirovakan (Vanadzor) were greatly affected with large losses of life and devastating effects to buildings and other structures. A number of the smaller outlying villages away from the larger population centers were also severely affected.

In a sign of the easing tensions of the Cold War, Soviet leader Mikhail Gorbachev formally asked the United States for humanitarian help within a few days of the earthquake, the first such request since the late 1940s. One hundred and thirteen countries sent substantial amounts of humanitarian aid to the Soviet Union in the form of rescue equipment, search teams and medical supplies. Private donations and assistance from non-governmental organizations also had a large part of the international effort. While transporting some of these supplies to the region, a Soviet aircraft carrying 9 crew members and 69 military personnel, and a transport plane from Yugoslavia, were both destroyed in separate incidents. In support of the relief effort, recording artists united to produce several music-related contributions for the victims of the quake. A song was produced by a duo of French composers (including Charles Aznavour) and a studio album that featured songs donated by mainstream rock bands was released from the Rock Aid Armenia effort by the British music industry.

== Political background ==
Beginning with late 1987 the Caucasus region was experiencing a surge in political turmoil with large and near constant demonstrations being held in the capital of Yerevan beginning in February 1988. For the fifteen months prior to the earthquake and at times up to hundreds of thousands of protesters, represented by the Karabakh Committee, were demanding both democracy and the unification of Nagorno-Karabakh (administered by Soviet Azerbaijan but disputed autonomous territory with a 76% Armenian majority and a 23% Azerbaijani minority in 1989) in the mountains of the Karabakh region. The unrest and the opposition movement began in September 1988 with negotiations between the Karabakh Committee and Gorbachev taking place throughout most of 1989. The relationship between the Soviet authorities and the Armenian society took a turn for the worse in March and the developments climaxed in November when a state of emergency was declared, along with a nighttime curfew, and a mass movement of up to 50,000 Armenians fleeing ethnic violence in events such as the Sumgait pogrom arrived from Azerbaijan.

== Earthquake ==
ShakeMap produced by the United States Geological Survey for the mainshock illustrating strong ground motion

The source of the event was a fault rupture 40 kilometers (25 mi) south of the Caucasus Mountains, a mountain range that has been produced by the convergence of the Arabian and the Eurasian tectonic plates. The range is situated along an active seismic belt that stretches from the Alps in southern Europe to the Himalayas in Asia. The seismicity along this belt is marked by frequent major earthquakes from the Aegean Sea, through Turkey and Iran, and into Afghanistan. Though the recurrence of seismic events in Armenia does not reach the high frequency that is seen in other segments of this zone, rapid crustal deformation there is associated with active thrust faulting and volcanic activity. Mount Ararat, a 5,137 m (16,854 ft) dormant volcano, lies 100 km (62 mi) to the south of the quake's epicenter in Turkey.

The earthquake occurred along a known 60 km (37 mi) thrust fault striking parallel to the Caucasus range and dipping to the north-northeast. Bruce Bolt, a seismologist and a professor of earth and planetary science at the University of California, Berkeley, walked the length of the fault scarp in 1992 and found that the vertical displacement measured 1 m (3.3 ft) along most of the length with the southwest end reaching 1.6 m (5.2 ft). During the earthquake, the northeast-facing side of the Spitak section rode up and over the southwest-facing side.

Waveform modeling established that the faulting originated at a depth of 5 km (3.1 mi) with the epicenter on the Alavar thrust fault on the slopes of the Lesser Caucasus mountains north of Mount Aragats. The mainshock produced surface rupture and propagated to the west with a separate strike-slip sub-event occurring two seconds later that propagated to the southeast. Going westward the fault split into two branches, a north-dipping reverse fault (north branch) and a right slip fault (south branch), but neither produced surface rupture. A total of five sub-events occurred in the first eleven seconds and an aftershock measuring 5.8 (local magnitude) occurred four minutes and twenty seconds later.

=== Damage ===
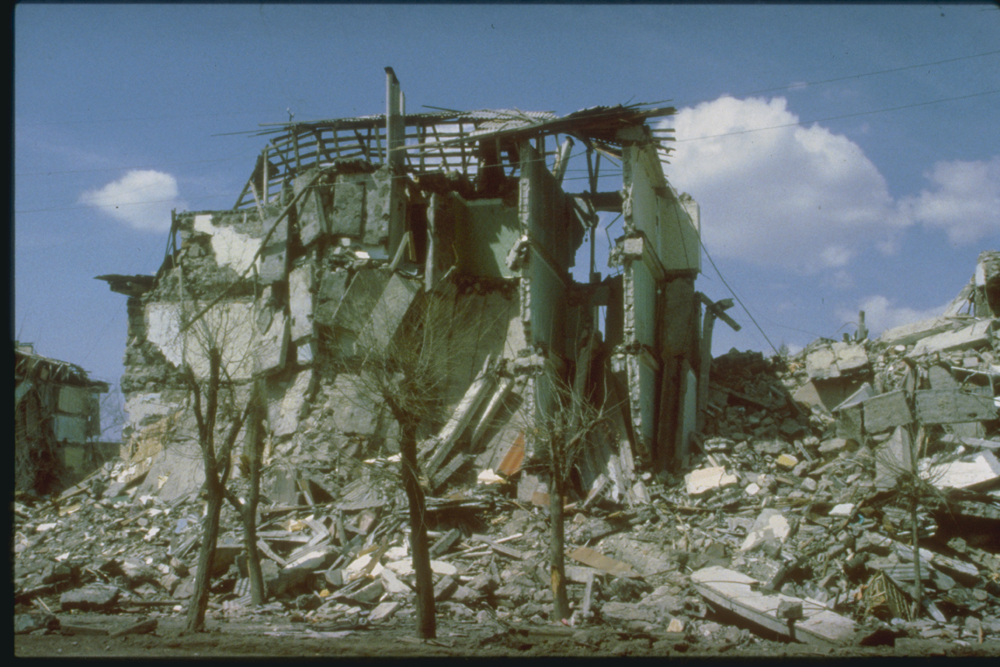
Building damage in Leninakan

Some of the strongest shaking occurred in industrial areas with chemical and food processing plants, electrical substations, and power plants. The Metsamor Nuclear Power Plant, around 75 km (47 mi) from the epicenter, experienced only minor shaking and no damage occurred there, but was eventually closed for a period of six years due to vulnerability concerns. It was reopened in 1995 in order to relieve Armenia of an energy crisis caused by the blockade imposed by Turkey and Azerbaijan against Armenia in response to the Karabakh Movement. Initially criticism mounted pointing out the lack of training, political instability in the Caucasus region, and accusations that the plant was of inadequate design.

Many buildings did not hold up to the shaking of the earthquake and those that did collapse often lacked any survival space, but lack of effective medical care and poor planning also contributed to the substantial scope of the disaster. Buildings that did not collapse featured well-maintained masonry and skeletal components that were joined adequately in a way that allowed for the building to resist seismic waves. Most bridges and tunnels and other public infrastructure withstood the earthquake but hospitals did not fare well. Most collapsed, killing two-thirds of their doctors, destroying equipment and medicine, and reducing the capacity to handle the critical medical needs in the region.

The Soviet news media and government officials soon began to discuss the apparent substandard construction styles that had caused so many of Armenia's buildings to collapse. Gorbachev, in a TV interview several weeks after his expedited return from New York City, said that the concrete blocks had been built with more than enough sand but too little concrete, and suggested that the concrete had been stolen. Leonid Bibin, deputy chairman of the state building committee, stated that many newer homes collapsed as well and that he was beginning an investigation into the matter and that criminal charges would be brought. The official communist party newspaper Pravda said that poor construction, like other issues of neglect in the Soviet system, could be blamed on the Era of Stagnation from the era of Leonid Brezhnev.

A team of earthquake and engineering experts from the United States spent a period of time in Armenia in December 1988 and January 1989. The group, including a structural engineer who specialized in seismic-resistant designs, agreed that building inadequacies were the primary reason why the strong (but not huge) earthquake was so damaging, although the freezing temperatures also played a role in the unusually high death toll. The earthquake death toll was by far the highest worldwide in the 1980s and third-highest worldwide in the period 1971–2003 (33 years). The engineers who scrutinized the damaged buildings and the rescue workers who had dismantled the buildings while extricating survivors ascribe both design shortcomings and improper construction methods for the failure of the buildings. The Soviets had modified their construction style to accommodate the known seismic risk in the area, but they acknowledged to the team that many of the buildings were not built to withstand an earthquake of that magnitude. An engineer with the team stated that the regulations for the area mandated that buildings be required to stand up against events measuring seven or eight on the twelve-degree Medvedev–Sponheuer–Karnik scale. The earthquake's effects were assessed at ten on that seismic scale.

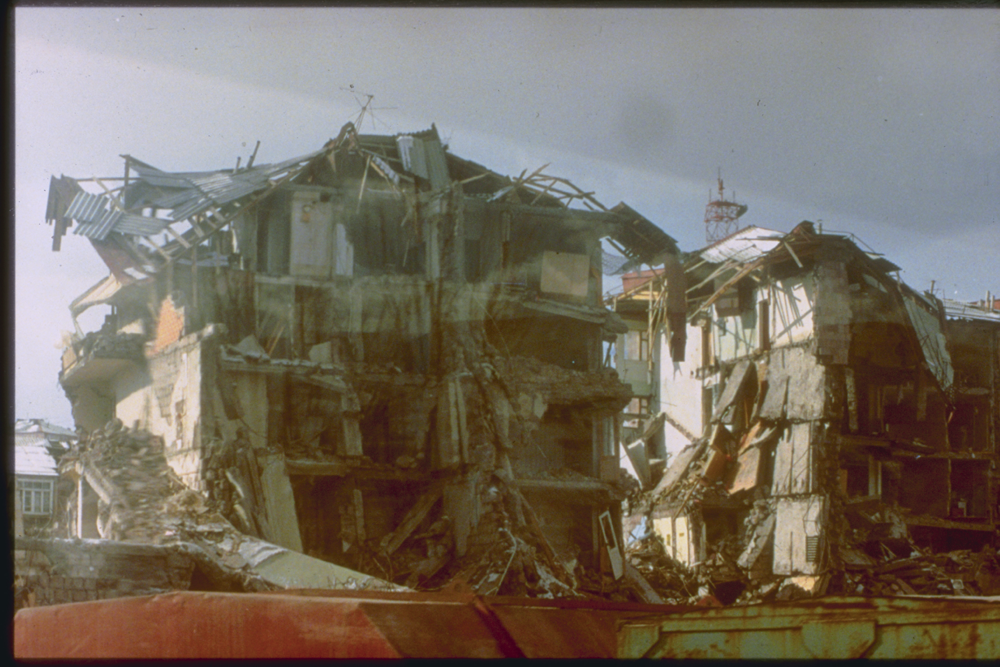
Severely damaged masonry buildings in Spitak

The three cities closest to the fault rupture experienced different levels of damage. Both Leninakan and Kirovakan were roughly equidistant from the shock, yet Leninakan had greater damage. This may be explained by a 300–400 m (980–1,310 ft) sedimentary layer that is present beneath the city. The Earthquake Engineering Research Institute's team compared building damage in each city and observed similar results when comparing stone buildings four stories or less in height, but for taller frame-stone buildings, 62% were destroyed at Leninakan while only 23% collapsed at Kirovakan. While on-site during aftershock monitoring, the US research team verified the presence of soil amplification effects when pronounced differences in readings were observed when compared with nearby rock sites. Uneven distribution of the seismic energy may have also contributed to the fluctuation in damage.

In late December the last of the survivors that were able to be extricated were pulled from the fallen buildings, rescue operations ceased, and the cleanup began, beginning with the destruction of buildings that were too heavily damaged to be repaired. Six friends were in the basement of a nine-story building relocating barrels when it came down around them on December 7. Their injuries were minor, but one person suffered a broken arm. They supposedly sustained themselves on the food supplies—fruit salad, pickles, and smoked ham—that were available in the basement for 35 days before their rescue in January, but this turned out to be a hoax.

=== Aftershocks ===
The area where Armenia lies is of interest to seismologists and geologists because of the relatively early stage of continental collision occurring there and because the earthquake's strong aftershock sequence and significant surface faulting presented scientists with an environment to study reverse faulting. Twelve days after the mainshock a French-Soviet team installed a temporary seismic network in the epicentral area to record aftershock activity (a separate expedition from the United States also visited the site). The initial portion of work included nearly a full week setting up the seismometers and optimizing their operation and, with that complete, two full weeks of continuous operation was then completed with twenty six seismometers covering an area over 1,500 km^{2}. The final stage concluded with seven weeks (through the end of February 1989) of continued monitoring with a reduced capacity of twenty units.

The instrumentation included ten smoked paper analog seismometers that were configured to allow for 48 hours of continuous single-component data recording. Six digital recorders built by the Institut de Physique du Globe de Strasbourg were also used to record signals from three-component seismometers. Eight of the selected sites were equipped with a vertical component velocity transducer along with an FM telemetry link to transfer data back to a central station where a three-component unit was stationed. There the seismic signals were digitized, along with an internal time signal and an external DCF77 time signal, and stored on magnetic tape. The tapes were then played back and the P wave and S wave arrival times were used to automatically determine aftershock locations. Approximately two hundred aftershocks were recorded each day for the first several days of the expedition and at the end of the recording period in February the equipment was still picking up around 100 shocks per day. The team then set out to determine an accurate velocity model using data from the more accurate telemetry network. The Soviet geophysicists detonated 100 kilograms of TNT in a hole drilled near the mainshock epicenter and the resulting shock waves were detected and used to help pinpoint a more accurate crustal velocity value of 5.3 to 5.4 km/s.

The epicenters of the recorded aftershocks formed a relatively narrow 50 km (31 mi) band. On the east end the events were shallow while on the western side, where the majority of the larger aftershocks were concentrated, the hypocenters were up to 14 km (8.7 mi) deep. The shocks at the southeastern segment indicated right-lateral strike-slip movement along a nearly vertical fault and may have been related to the Alavar fault. Moving westward closer to the central segments though, a transition of the fault type was becoming apparent, where an almost equal distribution of reverse fault mechanisms was observed as the strike-slip type. The east-central segment coincided with the surface breaks between Spitak and Gekhasar, while the west-central portion's break was concealed under an anticline and was not visible at the surface. Along the western segments, the fault split into two branches with one to the southwest and the other to the northwest.

=== Liquefaction ===
Buildings and other structures were extensively damaged during the earthquake, but roadways and railways also experienced disturbances. Many case histories pertaining to liquefaction in sandy soil exist, but few exist with respect to gravel and gravelly sands. In certain situations, gravelly sands may liquefy in a similar fashion as saturated sands. The first well-documented case of liquefaction in gravelly sands was in regard to the 1983 Borah Peak earthquake in the United States. Several investigations of that event took place in the 1980s and early 1990s and the primary conclusions were that a critical condition for liquefaction to occur in that type of soil was the presence of a low permeable crust that did not allow pore water pressures to subside and that the assessment method and associated standard penetration test values used with sandy soils also applied to gravelly soils.

Three locations between Spitak and Nalband (to the west) that were within several kilometers of the fault were examined for ground disturbances and each site was scrutinized for the effects of liquefaction. The first site was on the highway that linked the three most damaged cities and was adjacent to a tributary of the Pambak river where the water table was close to the surface. The highway's embankment failed, and though the site was repaired immediately, the resulting damage to the highway caused considerable delay in getting people and supplies into and out of the area following the disaster. Numerous sand boils were seen in the region northwest of Spitak including within 15 m (49 ft) of the failed embankment. A second site that was close to the fault, also near the Pambak river and with similar soil deposits, did not experience liquefaction, though it would have experienced the same high peak ground accelerations as the failed highway embankment.

== Search and rescue ==
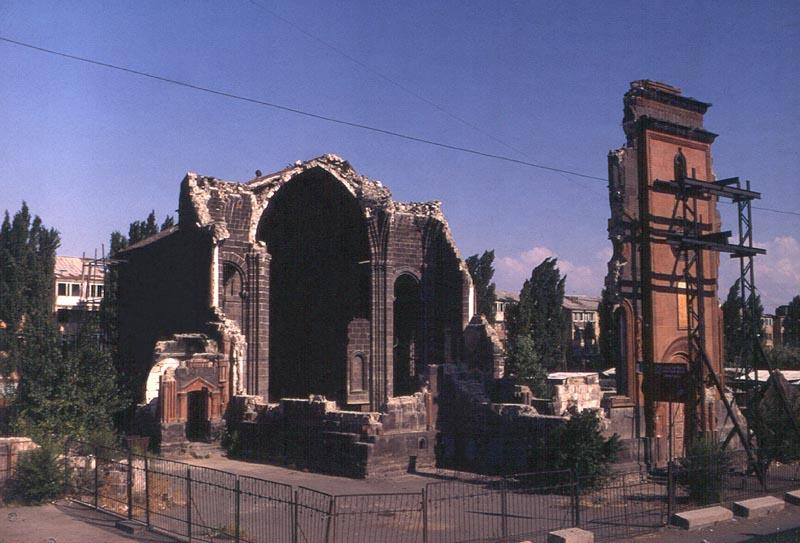
The Holy Saviour's Church in Gyumri after the earthquake

The total number of volunteer rescuers in Leninakan totalled 2,000, with personnel from Austria, Canada, France, Switzerland, the United Kingdom, the United States, Poland, Czechoslovakia and Yugoslavia. About 8 days after the earthquake, foreign rescuers were asked to depart so that Soviet demolition teams could begin destroying irreparable structures. Nikolai Ryzhkov, the then Chairman of the Council of Ministers, was awarded the National Hero of Armenia for his work in rebuilding the city following the earthquake.

Seventy-eight people were killed while on a relief mission to Leninakan when a Soviet Ilyushin Il-76 crashed on approach to the airport there. Nine crew and 69 military personnel were on board the plane that struck a helicopter in foggy conditions at the small airport that was overrun with rescue flights. In the days following the earthquake, the normally quiet airstrip was receiving up to 180 flights per day carrying food, medical supplies, and disaster management experts. Those who were killed on the plane were planning to join an estimated 20,000 soldiers and 85,000 civil defense workers in rescue efforts by searching for survivors, supplying food and water, and setting up sanitation facilities in the region. At the Yerevan airport, western pilots reported a breakdown in air traffic control communications, with flight controllers not delivering the necessary flight navigation instructions, allowing for a critical lack of separation as foreign planes made their way into the area.

A second air transport incident occurred the following day at Yerevan (capital of the Armenian Soviet Socialist Republic) when an Antonov An-12 from Yugoslavia crashed, killing all seven crew on board. The crash was blamed on the pilots' failure to properly adjust the altimeter following a miscommunication with the air traffic controllers.

A group of French recording artists and actors came together with the French writer and composer Charles Aznavour to record the 1989 song "Pour toi Arménie" (For you Armenia). Aznavour, together with Armenian-French composer Georges Garvarentz, formed a foundation called "Aznavour for Armenia" and composed the song as a call for help for the Armenians. It took six weeks from the creation of the song to completion of the disc and with almost two million copies sold, the foundation was able to build 47 schools and three orphanages for the victims of the disaster. Rock Aid Armenia, also known in earlier stages as Live Aid Armenia, was a humanitarian effort by the British music industry to raise money to help those affected by the earthquake. A monument, Armenian Earthquake, expressing the appreciation of the Armenian people for assistance from the U.S. was erected in Washington, D.C. in 1990. The pianist Evgeny Kissin wrote a letter in Golos Armenii stating that following the earthquake, instead of sending humanitarian aid, Azerbaijan sent crutches and coffin nails.

== International humanitarian efforts ==
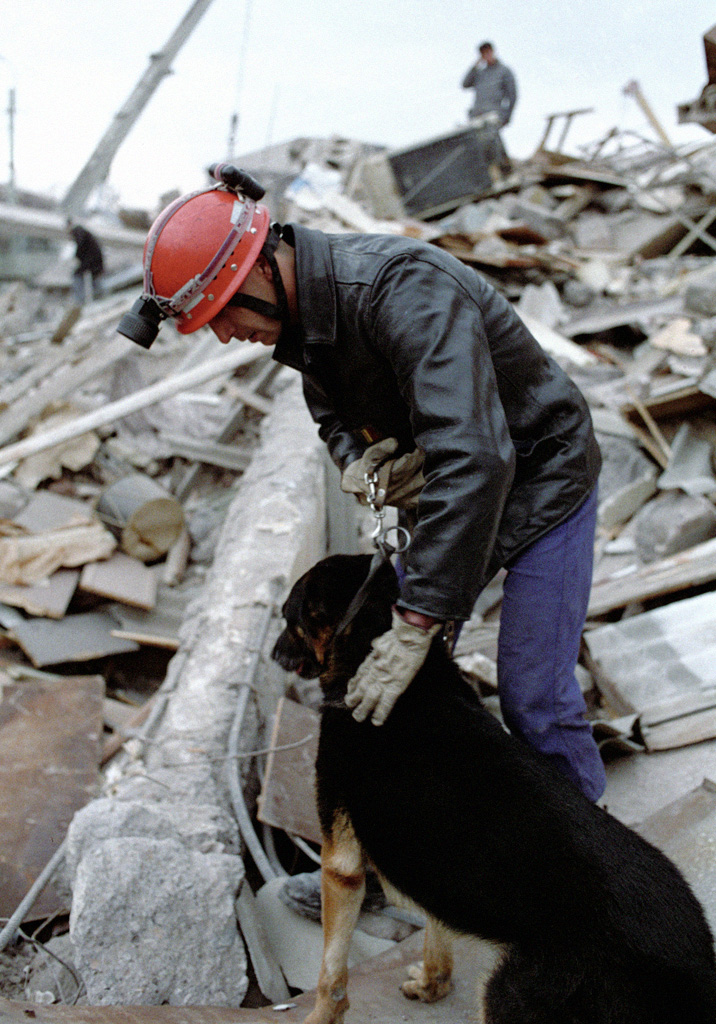
A French search and rescue worker searches for buried people with the aid of a detection dog

Gorbachev set aside 5 billion rubles (about US$8 billion) in funds for a start on what would likely be a recovery cost that would exceed the cleanup bill for the 1986 nuclear and radiation accident in Chernobyl, Ukraine. While foreign doctors did assist with the Chernobyl incident, the Soviet relief effort after the earthquake was augmented by the largest foreign cooperation since World War II. That deluge of western aid was a byproduct of the disaster that may have had a positive effect on Soviet Union–United States relations. The cost of rebuilding would be a severe obstacle for Perestroika, Gorbachev's plan for economic restructuring. Another adverse effect of the disaster was that the Armenians were already distrustful of Gorbachev's dismissal of their claims to the disputed territory of Nagorno-Karabakh, which the Armenians had been contesting with neighboring Azerbaijan. The tensions between the two countries prior to when the earthquake struck heightened amid reports of festivities being held and celebratory messages arriving from Azerbaijan.

The world responded rapidly to the disaster in Leninakan and Spitak, with much of Europe sending cargo aircraft loaded with medical supplies, rescue equipment, and trained personnel to assist in the recovery, and even more reinforcement coming in from Latin America and the Far East. Mikhail Gorbachev was in New York attending the Governors Island Summit on his first day of visits with Ronald Reagan and George H. W. Bush at the time of the earthquake, and once the scale of the disaster was realized, a quick departure was made back to Armenia, with the Kremlin formally asking for American help. Washington immediately responded with offers of doctors, medical equipment, and rescue teams, and by the first weekend the first US plane arrived in Yerevan with search and rescue teams and detection dogs. Bush's son and twelve-year-old grandson, Jeb Bush and George P. Bush, flew out later that month to Armenia to help in the distribution of American aid. They toured a hospital and prayed in a chapel. "Both my boys cried, overcome by what they had seen," President Bush later recounted. Both Gorbachev and Foreign Minister Eduard Shevardnadze told him that the gesture "sent a strong signal across the entire Soviet Union that America genuinely cared about their suffering."

The French arrived in Armenia in the late evening on Friday, 9 December, and relieved the exhausted Armenian workers who then returned to Yerevan. Japan sent a monetary gift of $9 million while Italy had plans to build a prefabricated village for the victims, and West Germany offered to send more than a dozen heavy cranes. The Americans donated generously as well, with Washington dispatching eight official planeloads of official relief aid plus a Lockheed C-141 Starlifter from Italy. Private donations from the United States were also significant. Chrysler chairman Lee Iacocca arranged for a fund drive, and in Chicago (one of five major Armenian population centers in the US) the community raised $800,000 and donated 9,000 kilograms (20,000 lb) of supplies.

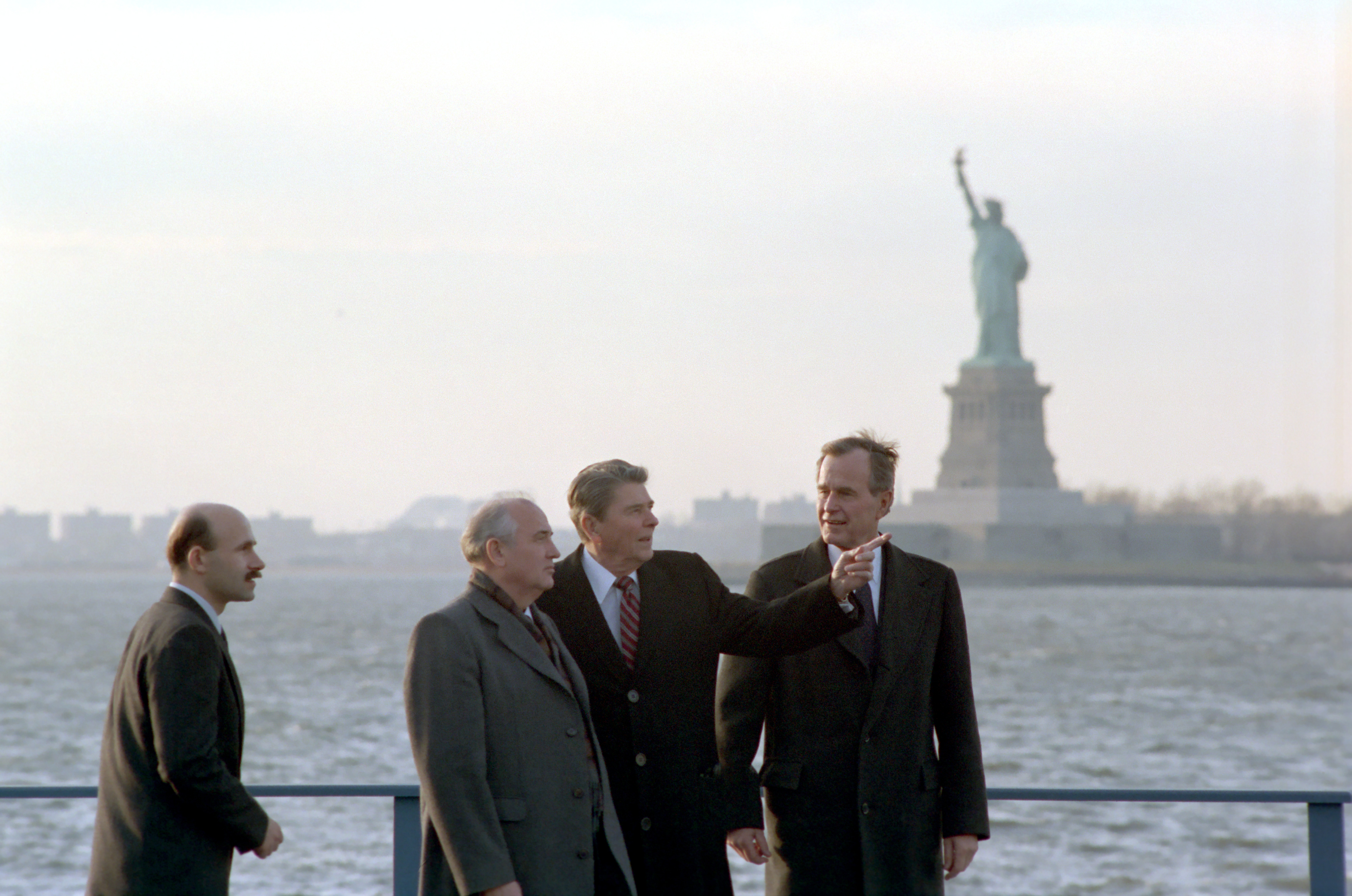
Mikhail Gorbachev with Ronald Reagan and George H.W. Bush in New York on the day of the earthquake due to the Governors Island Summit

American businessman and philanthropist Armand Hammer, well known to the Soviet Union for his financial pursuits and humanitarian ties, left Los Angeles for Armenia on board a Boeing 727 loaded with 1,000 kg (2,300 lb) of medical supplies that were provided by the American Red Cross. Hammer, known for his decades of work with the Occidental Petroleum Corporation, had spoken with Gorbachev prior to leaving and was carrying with him $1 million in relief funds. Half of those funds were from World Vision International, a California-based relief and development umbrella organization and the other half were his own personal donation. The flight also carried Robert Seiple (president of World Vision) and a UCLA doctor who had worked in the aftermath of the 1985 Mexico City earthquake.

Red tape inevitably held up some of the rescue efforts and criticism of the perceived flawed processes soon followed. The newspaper Pravda complained that the lack of cranes meant that "seconds and hours are being lost—that means lives." The paper also stated that too many Soviet personnel were giving advice and not enough people were actually searching. The daily newspaper Sotsialisticheskaya Industriya noted that there were families living out in the open even while there was an abundance of tents available. Health minister Yevgeniy Chazov urged the creation of a governmental body to assist with disaster management. Baxter International, an American health care company with headquarters in Deerfield, Illinois, designed and built a flying medical lab set up with 20 dialysis machines to be used with victims suffering from crush syndrome (trauma associated with building collapses), but were unable to get started for four days until the visas were available. With the hospitals destroyed and their limited knowledge of the care requirements, the Soviets were not well-equipped to deal with the cases of crush syndrome. Author and professor of geopolitics Pierre Verluise detailed in his 1995 book Armenia in Crisis: The 1988 Earthquake, how a French doctor and director of a Leninakan hospital described that he had seen one hundred victims suffering from the syndrome each day during the first three days. In order to prevent kidney failure or death, the treatment requires prompt hospitalization, and, according to the doctor, the victims were not receiving adequate medication and dialysis and, as a result, most died before the arrival of the first foreign dialysis machines.

=== Rebuilding ===
In February 1989 one hundred construction workers, including Batmunkh Luvsandash, were assembling temporary housing for themselves in Leninakan with a plan to start on the local population's housing by the end of the month, though schools and factories were also on the list of facilities to be rebuilt. Deputy chairman of a city building and architecture council said that updated building codes like those in the United States were being drafted (along with a strict requirement that the new protocols be respected) and that the new buildings would be no taller than four stories and would be located away from areas with the highest seismic risk. Other officials decided that the town would be relocated several kilometers to the southwest.

As of July 1989, about $500 million in donations had been delivered to the Armenians from 113 countries. Most of those funds went into the initial relief work and medical care plus the beginning portion of the rebuilding phase. Yuri S. Mkhitarian, an Armenian State Building Committee official, gave an updated damage report that included some of the outlying communities away from the population centers stating that 342 villages were damaged and another 58 were destroyed. The negative effect the earthquake had on the economy of Armenia was apparent. Mkhitarian said that 130 factories were destroyed and 170,000 people were out of work. Officials acknowledged that the work to complete the rebuilding may take up to five years or longer, a supposition that more than doubled Gorbachev's estimate of two years. At that time 20 projects had completed the planning process and some had been approved and construction started. In Leninakan, there was a need for 18 new hospitals, 12 of which could be funded with the assistance of the republics of the Soviet Union, but foreign help would be required to build six additional facilities. Boris Karapetyan, director of earthquake studies at the Yerevan Polytechnical Institute, said of the difficult rebuilding process "Coordination is a major, major problem. This is a massive undertaking, and foreign involvement is both a necessary and a complicating factor. We need foreign assistance—and there is no doubt about that—but our friends do not know the local conditions and propose things that cannot or should not be built in an earthquake-prone region."

The Soviets and an American group of architects each devised separate outlines for rebuilding the town of Spitak. Following an invitation by the Soviets for a critique of their plan, the American proposal was ultimately accepted as the way forward. The new plan would deviate from Soviet styles that were found to be rigid and outdated and would mirror characteristics of the local culture. For many years following World War II the Soviets practiced a methodical top-down approach to urban planning and building, constructing a large number of uniformly built row style apartment units, and the Soviets plan for rebuilding Spitak did not diverge from that approach. The Soviet's grid plan road scheme was found to not take into account the hillside at the new city's location, and the American plan included finer details of how commercial centers and government facilities were grouped together in an open and communal style.

== Other events ==
The Tsaghkadzor earthquake on 20 October 1827, was centred about 50 km (31 mi) southeast of Spitak and had a maximum intensity of VIII on the Medvedev–Sponheuer–Karnik scale. While that shock may have been related to the Pambak-Sevan fault, the 1926 Leninakan earthquake to the west of the 1988 event also had a maximum intensity of MSK VIII.

== See also ==
- Earthquake (2016 film)
- FEMA Urban Search and Rescue Task Force
- Geography of Armenia
- List of earthquakes in 1988
- List of earthquakes in Armenia
- Lord Byron School (Gyumri)
- Ministry of Emergency Situations (Russia)
- Out of the Ruins
- Urban Search and Rescue Virginia Task Force 1
