= 1988 Soviet Air Force Leninakan Il-76 crash =

Aviation accident in Soviet Armenia

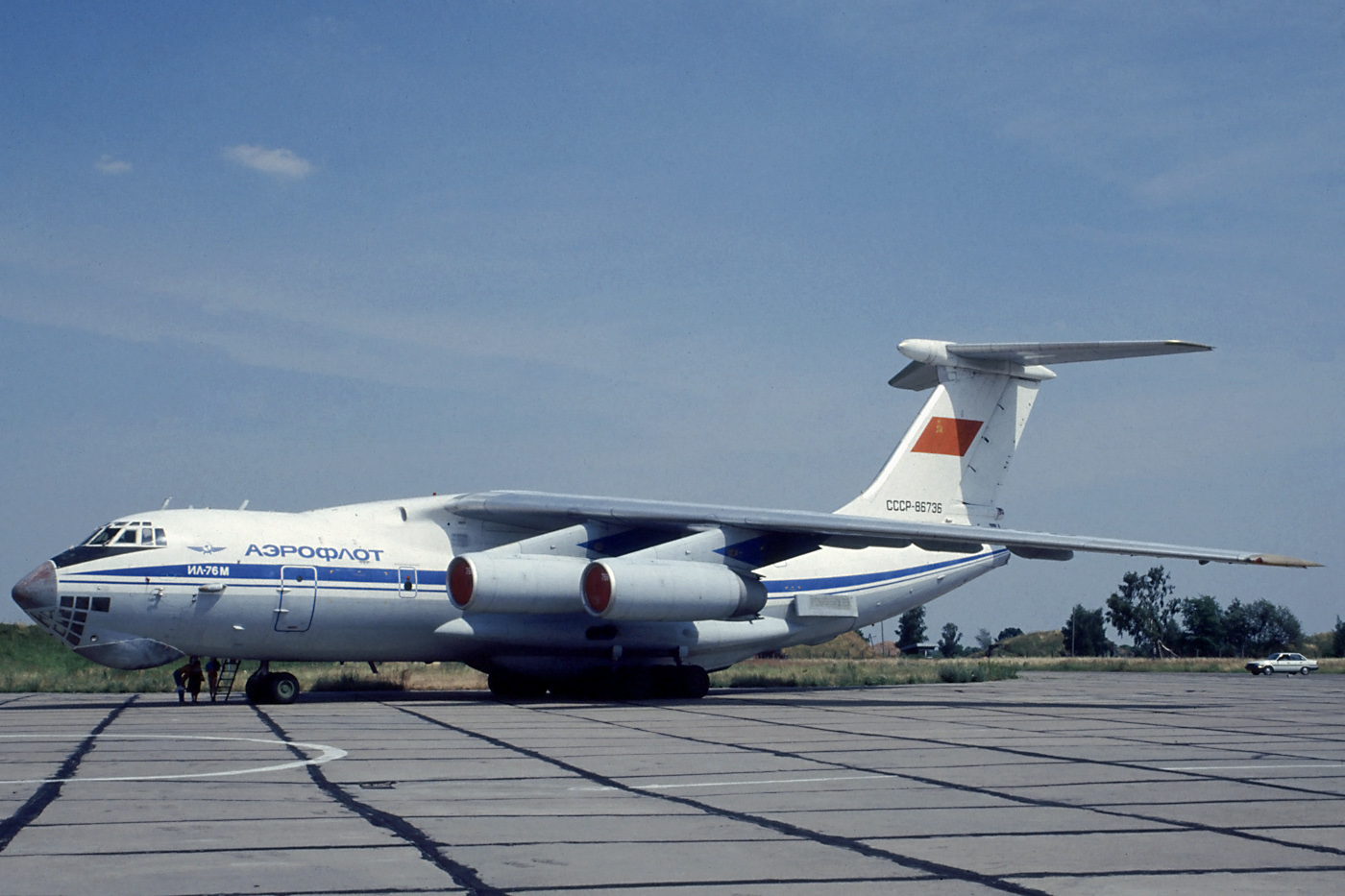
- An Ilyushin Il-76M similar to the aircraft involved

Accident
- Date: December 11, 1988
- Summary: Controlled flight into terrain due to pilot error
- Site: 15 km (9.3 mi) from Leninakan Airport

Aircraft
- Aircraft type: Ilyushin Il-76M
- Operator: Soviet Air Forces
- Registration: CCCP-86732
- Flight origin: Baku-Bina International Airport, Azerbaijan Soviet Socialist Republic
- Destination: Leninakan Airport, Armenian Soviet Socialist Republic
- Passengers: 69
- Crew: 9
- Fatalities: 77
- Survivors: 1

On 11 December 1988, an Ilyushin Il-76 aircraft crashed. Operated by the Soviet Air Force, the flight participated in relief efforts after an earthquake struck Armenia on 7 December. The aircraft crashed into a mountainside during an attempt to land at Leninakan, Armenia (then part of the Soviet Union), killing 77 of the 78 occupants on board. To date, it is the worst aviation disaster in Armenia.

== Aircraft ==
The aircraft was ten years old at the time of the accident, having first flown in 1978. The passengers were personnel of the Soviet Armed Forces—50 Azerbaijani, 13 Lezgin, 11 Russians, 2 Tatars, 1 Armenian and 1 Jew. The nine crew were Russian. Sixty-nine people on board were young troops assigned to aid in the post-earthquake recovery.

== Accident ==
The aircraft flew as part of the relief effort following the Spitak earthquake on 7 December. It transported military personnel and equipment to aid in relief efforts following the earthquake. It departed Baku-Bina International Airport in Azerbaijan for Leninakan Airport in Armenia. The aircraft entered Leninakan Airport airspace at 06:10 Moscow time, 56 minutes into the flight, and began to descend from 5,300 m (17,400 ft), as instructed by air traffic controllers. It struck the side of a mountain during its descent. All nine crew and 68 of the 69 passengers died. One passenger survived the crash because he had been sleeping in a Kamaz truck loaded with mattresses at the rear of the aircraft.

== Cause ==
A day after the crash, an Armenian spokesperson claimed the aircraft crashed after colliding with a helicopter while approaching the airport but news agencies disputed this. Speculations that it was shot down by Armenians also arose. The crash was eventually attributed to an incorrect altimeter setting by the flight crew which gave an incorrect altitude reading that was 1,100 m (3,600 ft) higher than the actual altitude. The indication on the altimeter at the time of impact was 1,425 m (4,675 ft). Crew fatigue was also cited as a factor in the crash as the flight crew was not given enough rest after carrying out multiple relief flights the previous day.
