= Shusha Declaration =

Azerbaijani–Turkish declaration on allied relations

Shusha Declaration on allied relations between the Republic of Azerbaijan and the Republic of Turkey
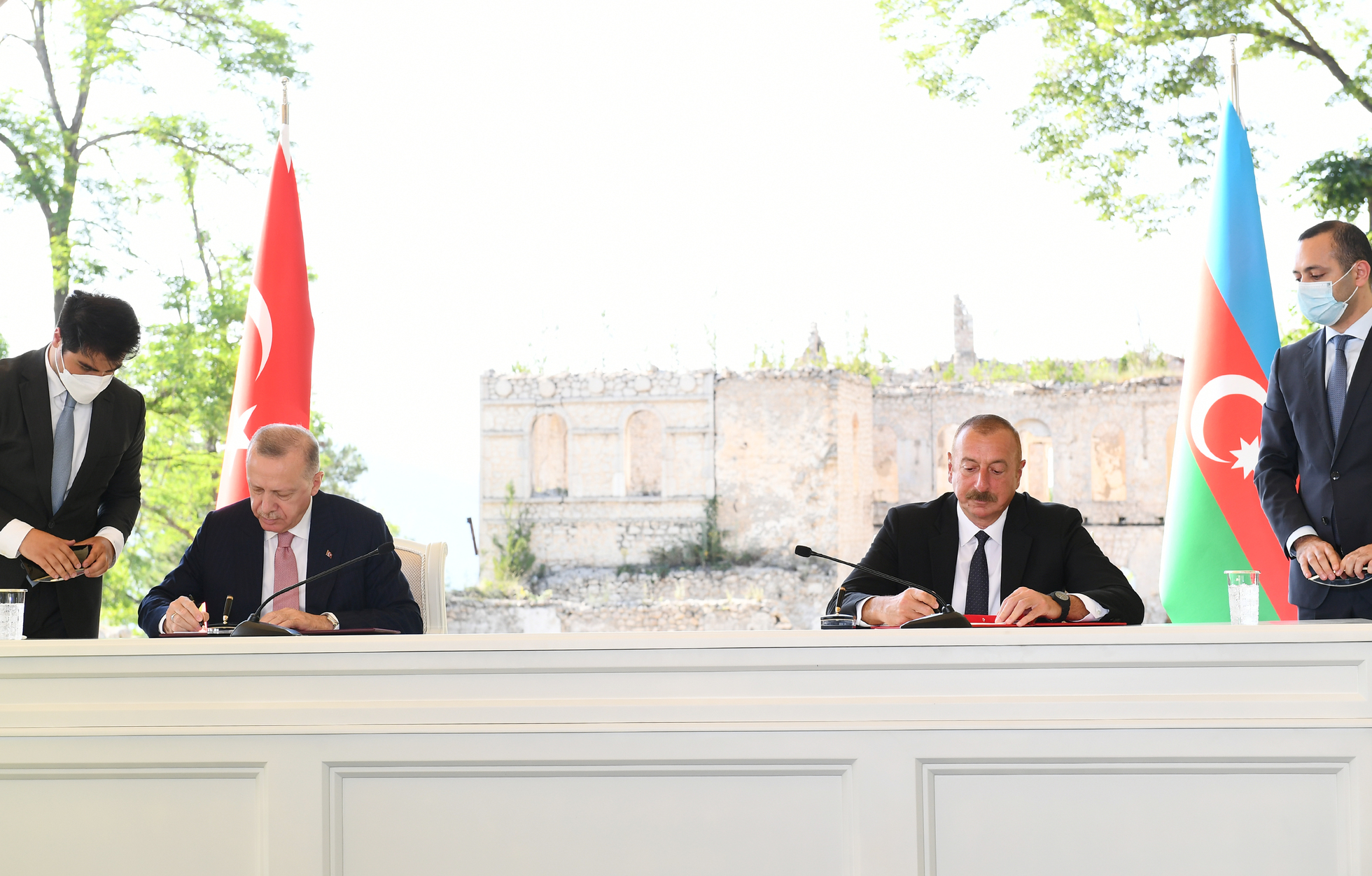
- Ilham Aliyev and Recep Tayyip Erdoğan signing the document
- Type: Cooperation treaty
- Context: Azerbaijan–Turkey relations, Nagorno-Karabakh conflict
- Signed: 15 June 2021
- Location: Shusha, Azerbaijan
- Signatories: Ilham Aliyev; Recep Tayyip Erdoğan

The Shusha Declaration, officially the Shusha Declaration on allied relations between the Republic of Azerbaijan and the Republic of Turkey, (Note: Azerbaijani: Türkiyə Respublikası ilə Azərbaycan Respublikası arasındakı müttəfiqlik münasibətləri haqqında Şuşa Bəyannaməsi Turkish: Türkiye Cumhuriyeti ile Azerbaycan Cumhuriyeti Arasında Müttefiklik İlişkileri Hakkında Şuşa Beyannamesi) is a declaration on allied relations signed between Azerbaijan and Turkey on 15 June 2021.

== History ==
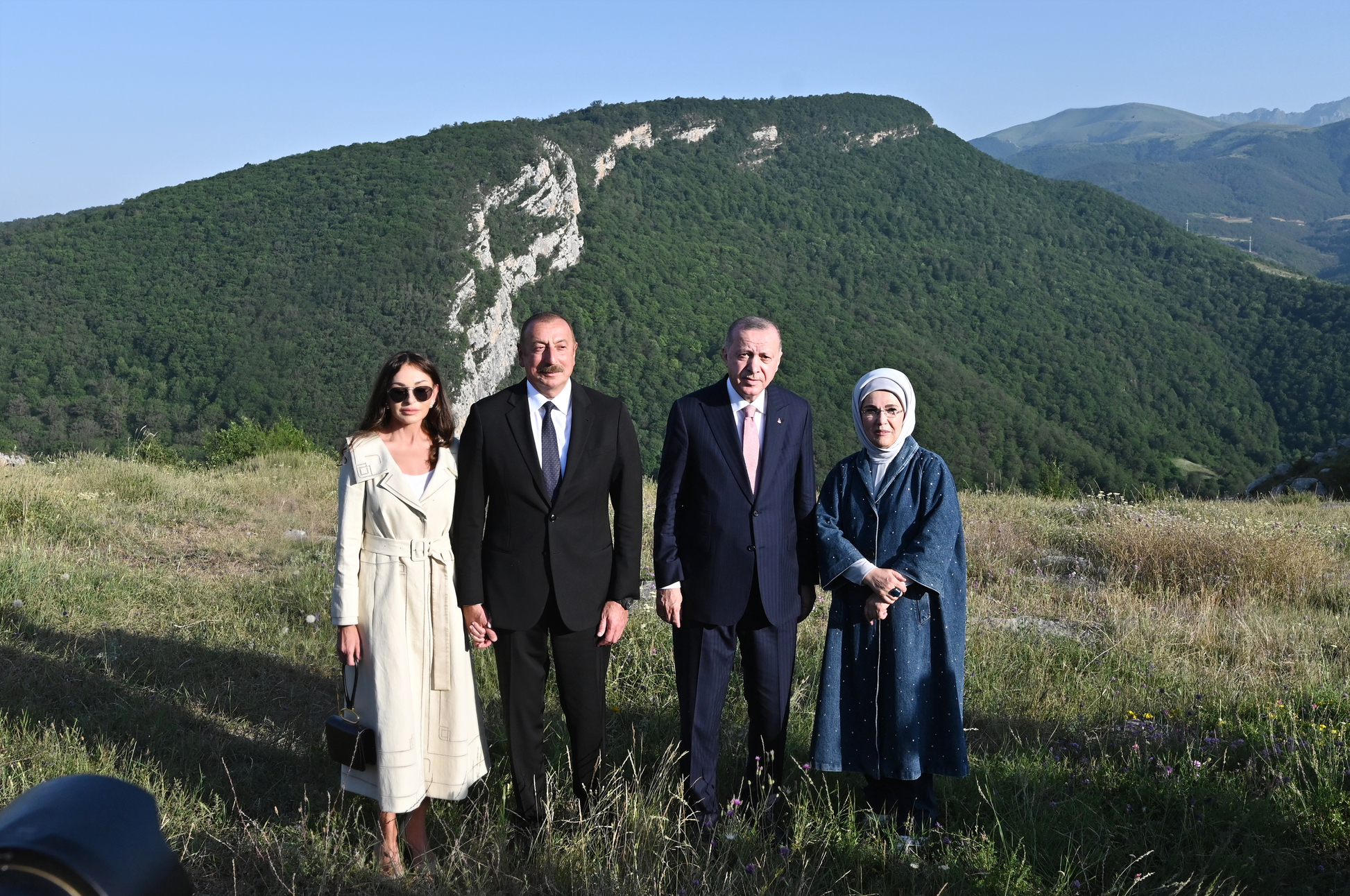
Mehriban Aliyeva, Ilham Aliyev, Recep Tayyip Erdoğan and Emine Erdoğan on top of hill before the signing of declaration

A joint declaration on allied relations was signed in Shusha on 15 June 2021, between President of Azerbaijan Ilham Aliyev and President of Turkey Recep Tayyip Erdogan as part of the latter’s official two-day visit to Azerbaijan.

== Scope ==
The declaration touched various issues in the political, economic, trade, culture, education, sport, and energy security sectors, the Southern Gas Corridor, cooperation in the field of defense industry, military cooperation and mutual military assistance, the so-called "Zangezur corridor", possibilities of cooperation within the framework of the proposed six-party platform (Azerbaijan, Armenia, Russia, Turkey, Iran, Georgia), and opening a Turkish consulate in Shusha.

== Reactions ==
- (Armenia) Armenian Foreign Ministry strongly condemned the signing of the declaration by Azerbaijani and Turkish presidents, as well as Erdogan's speech in National Assembly of Azerbaijan and the joint visit of Azerbaijani and Turkish presidents to "currently occupied city of Shushi of Artsakh Republic", considering it "a provocation against the security and peace in the region".
- Russia’s President's spokesperson Dmitry Peskov, commenting on Turkish President Recep Tayyip Erdogan’s statement on the possible establishment of a Turkish military base in Azerbaijan, said that “the deployment of military infrastructure by the [NATO] alliance countries near our borders is cause for our special attention as well as a reason for us to take steps to ensure our security and interests,” emphasizing that “regional players must not take actions containing any elements that could cause a rise in tensions.” The Russian Foreign Minister Sergey Lavrov also commented on the issue, by dismissing it as rumours.

== See also ==
- Azerbaijan–Turkey relations
