= Shirakamut =

Shirakamut Շիրակամուտ
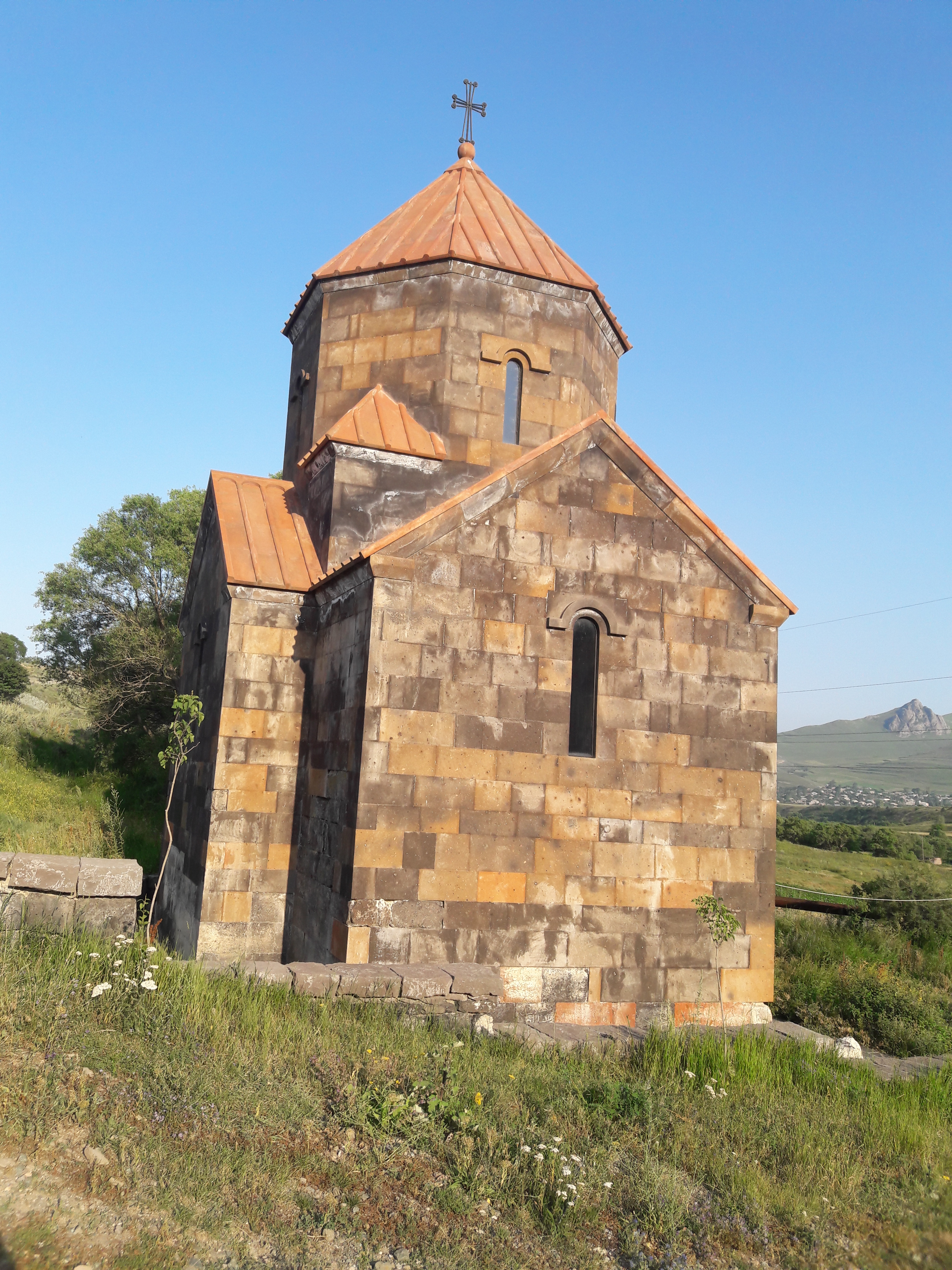
- Church in the village

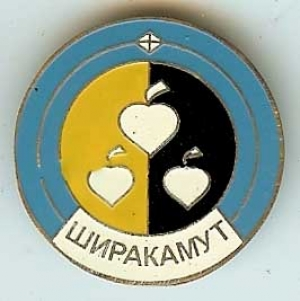
- Coat of arms

- Location within Armenia
- Coordinates: 40°51′38″N 44°09′10″E
- Country: Armenia
- Province: Lori
- Elevation: 1,650 m (5,410 ft)

Population (2011)
  - Total: 2,310
- Time zone: UTC+4 (AMT)

Shirakamut or previously Nalband (Armenian: Շիրակամուտ) is a village in the Lori Province of Armenia. The town was the epicenter of 1988 Armenian earthquake.

== Toponymy ==
After the Ruso-Turkish war in 1830 several families, such as Yeranosyan, Yeghiayaryan, Naslyan, etc. left their native land Basen in Ayrarat province of the Great Hayq and moved to the current area of Shirakamut or Nalband at the bank of Chichkhan river. The village is also known as Shirakarnut and previously as Nalband.
