= 1990s Armenian energy crisis =

Period of energy shortages in Armenia

Armenian energy crisis of 1990s
- Date: 1991–1995
- Duration: 4 Years
- Location: Armenia
- Also known as: Dark and Cold Years
- Cause: Turkish-Azeri blockade of Armenia (cutting off of natural gas pipelines); Shutting down of Metsamor Nuclear Power Plant after Spitak Earthquake
- Outcome: Emigration of 676,000–800,000 people

The energy crisis, popularly known as the "dark and cold years" (Armenian: Մութ ու ցուրտ տարիներ), refers to the energy crisis in Armenia and the Republic of Artsakh during the 1990s, when the newly independent Armenia's population lived in shortage of energy and basic consumer goods. The crisis was caused by the joint Turkish–Azeri blockade which prevented the transportation of fuel and other supplies to Armenia and Nagorno-Karabakh. The blockade was initiated in 1989 by Azerbaijan, originally in response to the Karabakh movement which called for the region's independence from Azerbaijan and reunification with Armenia.

The energy crisis left a deep impact and impression on Armenian society. Local people have dubbed the years from 1992 to 1995 in different ways, such as "hungry", "cold", and "bad", but the most common title used is "the dark". Hospitals struggled to function due to acute shortages of electricity, heat, and medical supplies, which led to many ceasing operations. Electricity in Yerevan was available for only two hours a day, which raised the risk of freezing or starvation. Trees on hospital grounds were cut in order to provide wood for burning to keeping hospitals warm. By 1993, over half of the hospitals in Armenia had stopped operating because they lacked essential resources, leading to the deaths of healthy infants due to the cold and inadequate equipment. The energy crisis forced reliance on unsustainable practices like widespread deforestation and intensive agriculture, leading to risky energy solutions such as the potential reactivation of the Metsamor Nuclear Power Plant which had recently been closed due to the Spitak Earthquake. Lake Sevan, Armenia's largest freshwater body, experienced significant water level drops due to increased reliance on hydroelectric power to compensate for the energy shortfall. This drawdown for irrigation and energy purposes threatened the lake's ecosystem, endangering its flora and fauna.

The energy crisis precipitated massive layoffs and a decline in living standards, leading to between 17% and 30% of Armenia's population emigrating, further expanding the Armenian diaspora.

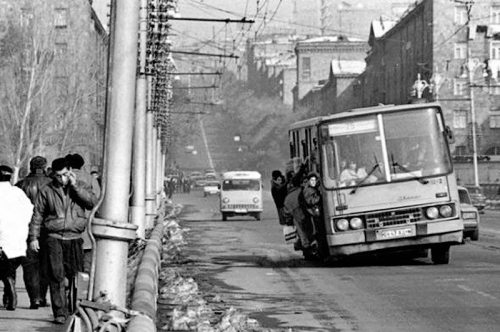
An overloaded bus in the streets of Yerevan

== The Energy Crisis ==
On 20 February 1988, the Karabakh movement officially started as the Supreme Council of the Nagorno-Karabakh Autonomous Oblast, which was ethnically Armenian, voted to request to transfer its jurisdiction from Azerbaijan Soviet Socialist Republic to the Armenian Soviet Socialist Republic. On 7 December of the same year, an earthquake of 6.9 magnitude occurred centered in the town of Spitak in Armenia, leaving 25,000 people dead and 500,000 people homeless. The Metsamor NPP, which was 100 km away from the epicenter of the earthquake, had had a safe shutdown, and had no damages according to the authorities and the IAEA. However, due to the panic that was raised afterwards and protests by the Green party of Armenia, it was officially decided to shut down both units of Metsamor, the only nuclear power plant of Armenia providing about 36% of the electricity needs of the country at the time. Unit 1 of ANPP was shut down in February 1989 and Unit 2 followed in March 1989.

Armenian independence from the Soviet Union came on 21 September 1991, when the war over Nagorno-Karabakh was in full swing. Armenia's energy supply during the Soviet Union was designed as an integrated part of the Trans-Caucasus electrical grid. After the collapse of the Soviet Union, and because of the lack of internal energy supply, Armenia faced a critical situation." Turkey and Azerbaijan closed their borders with Armenia, putting a fuel embargo on the country. Azerbaijan blocked a natural gas pipeline from Turkmenistan which was flowing through Azerbaijan, effectively cutting off about 90% of the natural gas supply of the country. During the clash, which lasted until May 1994, Azerbaijan blockaded roads, rail lines and energy supplies, leading to severe energy shortages in Armenia.

Attempt was made to direct gas pipelines from Georgia to Armenia. However, Georgia's internal conflicts lent themselves to failure of the project on multiple occasions. From late January to mid-March 1993, Azerbaijani saboteurs blew up the gas pipeline that was crossing Marneuli, a region of Georgia populated with Azerbaijani, seven times.

With thermal and nuclear power stations unable to function, Armenia was left to rely almost entirely on its hydro power resources, at a great environmental expense to one of the country's greatest natural resources, Lake Sevan. There was also the issue of providing daily subsistence to the public besides energy, as the whole country was short of bread. People had to wait in queues for a very long time, because there was no bread, and sometimes the queues could last for a few days. Many basic necessities such as sugar and eggs were also in scarcity.

By the winter of 1994–95, Yerevan residents had access to electricity for only 1–2 hours a day. Each district had its own set time for electricity availability.

== Recovery ==
The energy crisis ended when Metsamor Nuclear Power Plant Unit 2 was brought back online in October 1995, making it the only reactor in the world that was restarted after closing. The restart of the NPP increased the electricity available to the public to 10–12 hours a day. The electricity supply then increased to 24-hours a day, 7 days a week. The bombing of pipelines by Azerbaijanis coming from Georgia also stopped afterwards as it did not have the same effect as before, since Armenia was not as reliant on the pipeline system anymore.

Furthermore, other power plants, such as Hrazdan Thermal Power Plant, Vorotan Cascade and Sevan-Hrazdan Cascade, provided daily load capacity, while Metsamor Nuclear Power Plant provided base load capacity. Thermal power plants operated to provide electricity in winter when electricity demand was peak, as it was quite a cold winter in Armenia. Although these times have passed, Armenia still relies on imported resources like gas and oil, which had collapsed the whole electricity production system in the 1990s. All the imported gas and oil is supplied from Russia via Georgia. Only a small amount of gas is supplied by Iran.

== Aftermath ==
The Armenian electricity system reached 3914 MW of installed (full) capacity. However, only 2845 MW (73%) is currently operating. Electricity is mainly produced from 3 sources: nuclear (34%), thermal (32%) and hydro (34%). Over the past few years this number has increased as many new power plants have been constructed. Currently, Gas-powered turbines provide 25% of Armenia's electricity. These turbines not only produce a large amount of electricity, but they are also very efficient, which in turn has reduced the price for 1 kWh from 400 AMD to 160-170 AMD. There are also a few small power plants with a capacity of 50 MW. One is Yerevan Thermoelectric Plant, which produces electricity mainly for Nairit Chemical Plant. The other is Vanadzor Thermoelectric Plant, which is not currently operational, but will operate for Vanadzor Chemical Plant when it opens. Metsamor Nuclear Power Plant produces approximately 440 MW of electricity at full capacity, but only 1 of the units (the 2nd unit) is operating.

The largest portion of electricity production comes from hydropower plants. The largest hydropower plants in Armenia are Sevan-Hrazdan and Vorotan cascades, which can produce up to 960 MW of electricity. The Armenian electricity sector was in a real crisis from 1990 to 1995, but people were able to survive in such conditions, and now have a reliable electricity supply system.
