= Crossroads of Peace =

International freight train corridor

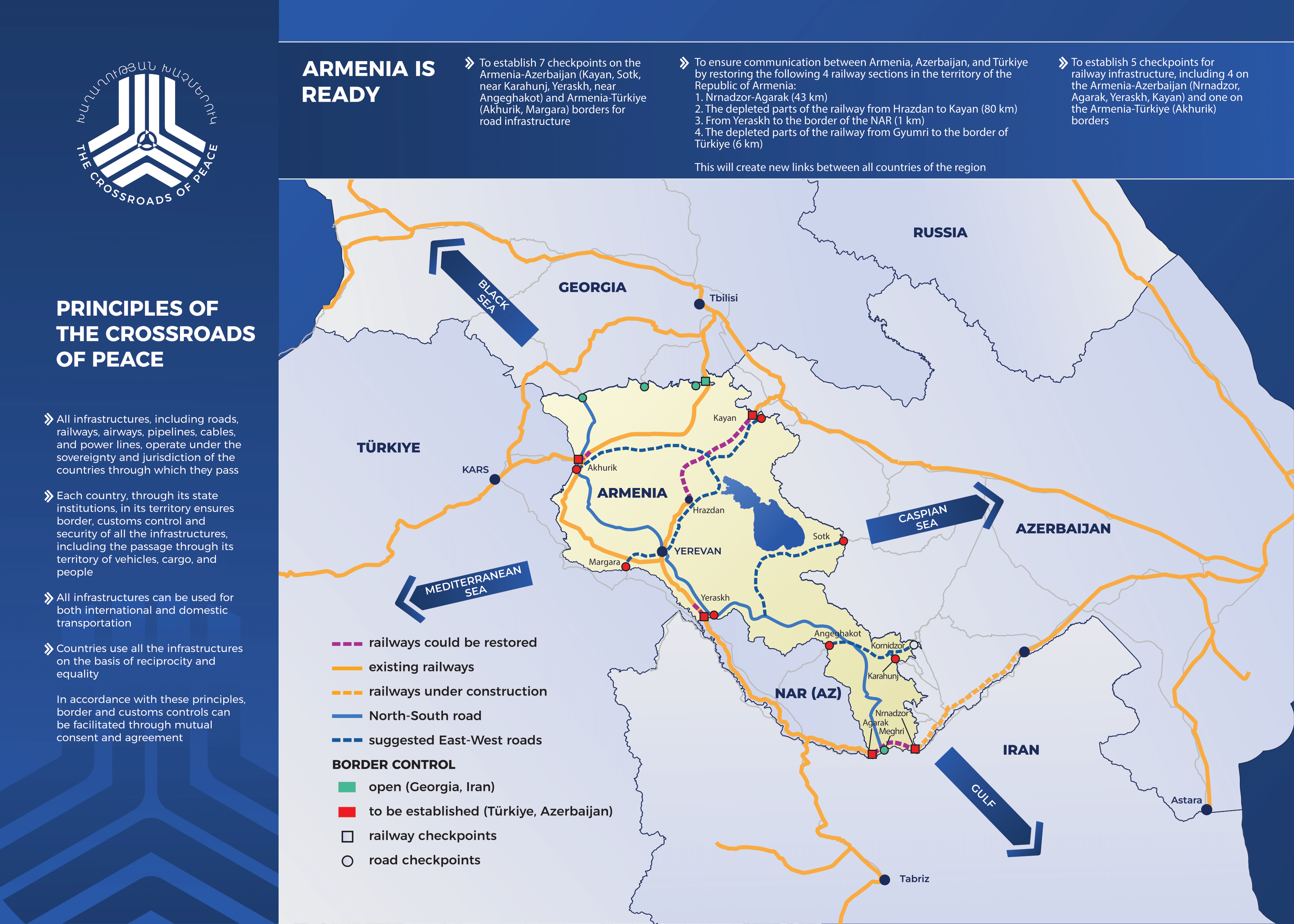

Overview
- Status: Proposed
- Locale: Armenia; Azerbaijan; Georgia; Iran; Turkey

The Crossroads of Peace (Note: Armenian: Խաղաղության խաչմերուկ; Azerbaijani: Sülhün kəsişməsi; Georgian: მშვიდობის გზაჯვარედინი; Persian: چهارراه صلح; Turkish: Barış Kavşağı) is a transportation project proposed by the Armenian government in October 2023, which seeks to improve Armenia's links to neighboring Azerbaijan, Georgia, Iran and Turkey, and to restore cooperation in the region and promote mutual understanding among nations.

The project has been positioned as complementary to the International North–South Transport Corridor.

== Main principles ==
	Principles of the Crossroads of Peace
Principle #1	All infrastructures, including roads, railways, airways, pipelines, cables, and electricity lines, operate under the sovereignty and jurisdiction of the countries through which they pass.
Principle #2	Each country, through its state institutions, in its territory ensures border, customs control and security of all the infrastructures, including the passage through its territory of vehicles, cargo, and people.
Principle #3	These infrastructures can be used for both international and domestic transportation.
Principle #4	All countries use all the infrastructures on the basis of reciprocity and equality.

== Projects ==
=== Rail ===
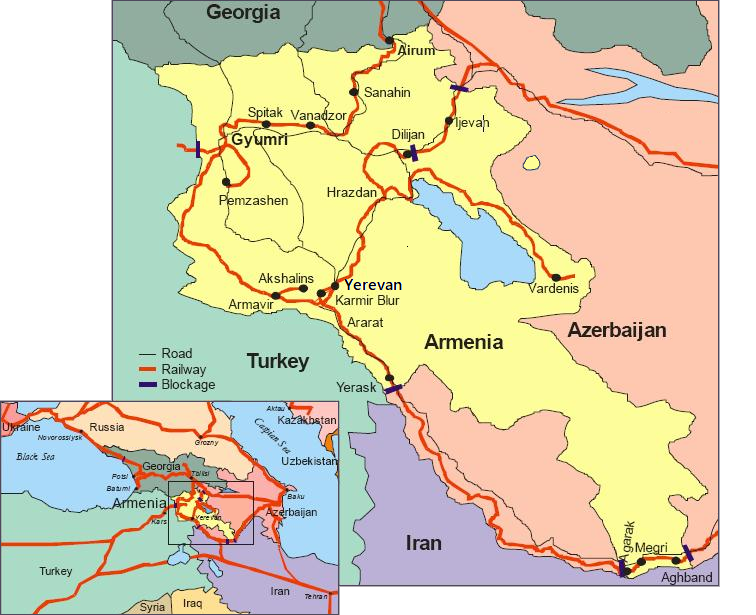
Armenia's rail system

==== Yeraskh-Julfa-Meghri-Horadiz railway ====
Armenia plans to restore the Soviet-era Yeraskh-Julfa-Meghri-Horadiz rail route, which would not only connect Armenia and Azerbaijan, but would also restore Armenia's railway connection with Iran and Russia. With this project, Armenia could offer new logistic pathways linking the Caspian Sea to the Mediterranean and Black seas through Armenian territory.

=== Trade ===
==== Gyumri dry port ====
Armenian plans to establish a dry port and free-trade zone in Gyumri, featuring multi-modal air, rail and trucking facilities connected to warehouses and industrial parks. Plans include a direct connection to rail transport and to the Gyumri Shirak International Airport.
