= Battle of Lachin =

- Part of First Nagorno-Karabakh War
Date	1–19 October 1992
Location	Lachin corridor
Result	Armenian victory

Belligerents
Nagorno-Karabakh; Armenia	Azerbaijan

Commanders and leaders
Hrach Andreasyan	Surat Huseynov; Dadash Rzayev

Casualties and losses
25 killed	31 killed, 43 injured

The Battle of Lachin was a military operation during the First Nagorno-Karabakh War, undertaken by the National Army of Azerbaijan in order to regain control over the Lachin corridor, controlled by the army of the unrecognized Nagorno-Karabakh Republic (NKR) since 18 May 1992. It was one of the fiercest battles in this direction that unfolded in the autumn of that year.

== Background ==
The autumn of 1992 was the culmination of Azerbaijan's military successes. At some point, the Azerbaijanis captured the village of Syrkhavend north of Stepanakert and the road to the east of the city and were preparing to regain control of the Lachin corridor. The Ministry of Defense in Baku planned to send a convoy of buses there to evacuate the Armenian civilian population from the territories that Azerbaijan was going to occupy.

In an interview with the newspaper Khural in March 2014, Surat Huseynov, who commanded one of the advancing groups of Azerbaijan, commenting on the operation, recalls:

Our offensive in 1992 was successful, we were 17 km from Khankendi (Stepanakert). But Elchibey suddenly gave the order to block the Lachin corridor. I was against it, because, firstly, the northern direction of hostilities was the most successful for us, and if we changed the direction of the strike, we risked encountering difficulties. Secondly, it was necessary to leave the Lachin corridor so that the peaceful Armenian population had the opportunity to leave Karabakh. [...] Elchibey persistently told me no, that it is necessary to close the corridor, this is an order, do it…

== Battle ==
On 1 October 1992, units of the 2nd Army Corps of Azerbaijan under the command of Major General Dadash Rzayev launched an offensive from the village of Muradkhanly in the north of the Gubadli District, located south of Lachin. A second grouping of Azerbaijani troops was attacking Lachin from the northwest. By inflicting converging strikes from the south and north of Lachin, the Azerbaijanis planned to pincer the Armenian troops and, having taken control of the city itself, gradually restore control over the entire Lachin District. If the operation was successful, the Armenian troops in Nagorno-Karabakh would be cut off from Armenia.

At the end of September 1992, the First Deputy Minister of Defense of Armenia, Lieutenant-General Hrach Andreasyan, who took command of the Armenian troops in the region of the Lachin corridor, took measures to create a stable active defense. The concentration of the Armenian group on the border of the Shusha and Gubadli regions began to strike at the right flank of the Azerbaijani group advancing on Lachin from the south.

After fierce fighting on October 3–6, Azerbaijani troops approached Lachin from the south. In several places they managed to establish fire control over the Lachin corridor. As a result, Armenian communications in the corridor zone were practically cut. The units advancing from the north came close to Lachin, coming within 6–8 km of the city, but the Azerbaijani troops failed to completely take control of the Stepanakert-Goris road running through Lachin and Shusha or occupy the city itself.

Having exhausted the Azerbaijanis in defensive battles, on October 8, the Armenian troops launched a counteroffensive. From the direction of the Shusha District, they struck at the right flank of the Azerbaijani troops advancing from the south. Having made a gap in the right flank of the Azerbaijani troops advancing on Lachin from Gubadli, the Armenians managed to penetrate deep into the main forces of the Azerbaijani group and widen this gap. Armenian troops attacking from the territory of Armenia managed to expand the corridor to the south.

The Armenian counteroffensive and a breakthrough in the rear led to the disorganization of the Azerbaijani troops and the loss of command and control. During 9–12 October 1992, Armenian troops managed to push the Azerbaijanis away from Lachin. On 12 October 1992, the Armenian troops, developing the offensive, reached the border of the Gubadli region, where they were stopped near the village of Muradkhanli. To divert the Azerbaijani forces from Lachin, the Armenians carried out a number of operations: they attacked Aghdam, and also landed a helicopter landing force (40 people) in northern Karabakh controlled by the Azerbaijanis, two kilometers from the Sarsang Reservoir.
