= Nalband, Armenia =

Nalband
- Location within Armenia
- Coordinates: 40°51′30″N 44°09′41″E
- Country: Armenia
- Marz (Province): Lori
- Time zone: UTC+4 ( )
  - Summer (DST): UTC+5 ( )

Nalband (Armenian: Նալբանդի Nalbandi) is a town in the Lori Province of Armenia.
