= Anti-Armenian sentiment in Azerbaijan =

Location of anti-Armenian massacres and pogroms in Azerbaijan

Anti-Armenian sentiment is widespread in Azerbaijan. Observers and human rights bodies describe Armenians as the most vulnerable ethnic group in the country, noting widespread negative stereotyping in public discourse. Polling over the past decades has shown deep animosity toward Armenia, and the term "Armenian" (erməni) is widely used as an insult in everyday language and media.

Historical roots trace back to anti-Armenian sentiment in Turkey, pan-Turkism, the actions of Russian and Soviet authorities, and the higher economic and social status of Armenians compared to Azeris at the turn of the 20th century. Contemporary Armenophobia in Azerbaijan traces its roots to the Karabakh Movement, in which Armenians petitioned Soviet authorities to transfer the mostly Armenian-populated Nagorno-Karabakh Autonomous Oblast (NKAO) in Azerbaijan to Armenia. In response, anti-Armenian pogroms occurred in Sumgait, Kirovabad and Baku. From 1988 through 1992, an estimated 300,000–350,000 Armenians were either deported from or fled Azerbaijan under threat of violence — primarily from areas outside Nagorno-Karabakh, where the Armenian population was largely spared. The conflict eventually escalated into the First Nagorno-Karabakh War, in which Azerbaijan lost control over the territory to the self-proclaimed Nagorno-Karabakh (Artsakh) Republic, further magnifying anti-Armenian sentiment.

Since its independence from the Soviet Union, the Azerbaijani government has institutionalized anti-Armenian attitudes through school curricula, state media, historical negationism, and the erasure or appropriation of Armenian cultural heritage. Government officials and prominent figures within Azerbaijan routinely engage in hate speech against Armenians, using dehumanizing language and promoting negative caricatures of Armenians. Human rights organizations and others have documented various anti-Armenian conduct within Azerbaijan including restrictions on Armenian identity and right of return, torture, extrajudicial killings, and sexual violence. State-sponsored symbols such as the military trophy park in Baku and postage stamps reinforce dehumanizing narratives.

Anti-Armenian sentiment is cited as a genocide risk factor and contributed to the forcible expulsion of all Armenians from Nagorno-Karabakh (Artsakh). The Armenians that remain in Azerbaijan face a deeply marginalized existence, conceal their identities, and are sometimes described as "second-class citizens."

== Early period ==
The establishment of the Azerbaijani state is historically linked to ethnic violence against Armenians. For over a century, Turkish and Azerbaijani authorities cultivated anti-Armenian sentiment. In a secret July 1920 letter, Soviet Karabakh leader Asad Karayev urged his counterpart Nariman Narimanov to "kill a Russian soldier and accuse the Armenians of the crime," then wipe out Zangezur’s Armenians and their wealth so "this accursed tribe can never rise again."

Other incidents include the Armenian–Tatar massacres (1905-1906), and the Armenian–Azerbaijani war (1918–1920) which included the Muslim uprisings in Armenia (1919-1920). In these periods organized killings of Armenians occurred in the Armenian cultural centers in Baku and Shushi. Scholars consider these incidents to be precursors or extensions of the Armenian Genocide. Between 1914 and 1918, pan-Turkic military campaigns—coordinated between the Ottoman Empire and local Caucasian Tatars (Azeris)—sought the elimination of Armenian presence and autonomy in the Caucasus. In this period, although all sides engaged in violence, the balance of power was skewed against Armenians, in part due to the policies of Turkey and Britain. Vahakn Dadrian, professor of sociology, describes Turkey’s collusion with Azeris as a deceitful "Ittihadist pattern of genocide," citing statements from Turkish General Karabakeir who wrote "under the pretext of protecting the rights of Muslim minorities, there is ground for constant intervention" and "arming the Turks of the area little by little, toward the goal of linking up east and west in the area, and molding Azerbaijan into an independent Turkish government through the creation of a national force structure."

In 1918, Azerbaijan in collaboration with Ottoman Turkey carried out genocidal massacres of 15,000-60,000 Armenians in Azerbaijan, which permanently diminished the historical Armenian presence in the region. Massacres of Armenians occurred in Baku, Nagorno-Karabakh (Khaibalikend and Shusha), and 45 villages of Nakhchivan (e.g. Agulis). In several incidents, the massacres of Armenians had been planned in advance. Armenians were mass arrested, forcibly disarmed, displaced, and subjected to public hangings. The Armenians of Azerbaijan faced extermination under the policies of Governor Khsrov bey Sultanov. who was an anti-Armenian Musavatist and advocate of pan-Turkism. The 1920 Turkish invasion of Armenia led to Armenia ceding land to Azerbaijan, creating the Turkish protectorate of Nakhchivan and enabling the ethnic cleansing of Armenians from the area.

== Soviet Era ==
Anti-Armenian sentiment was well-established before and during the Russian Revolution of 1917 and formed a foundational element of Azeri nationalism. The incorporation of Armenia into the USSR prevented the complete annihilation of the Armenian nation. Despite this, during the Soviet Era, the Armenians of Nakhichevan and of Lachin were subjected to gradual ethnic cleansing by Soviet Azeri authorities resulting in the exodus of all Armenians from the region. During the Soviet Era, Armenians were scapegoated for state, societal and economics shortcomings in Azerbaijan. Certain sources have described Azerbaijani policies of discrimination against Armenian in this period as "apartheid."

=== Suppression of Armenian culture in Nagorno-Karabakh ===
Between 1921 and 1990, under the control of the Azeri SSR within the USSR, Armenians in Nagorno-Karabakh faced economic marginalization, deportation, and cultural discrimination, leading to a significant exodus. Soviet Azeri authorities also encouraged the inflow of Azeris from outside Nagorno-Karabakh. This policy – sometimes called a "White Genocide" – aimed at "de-Armenizing" the territory culturally and then physically and followed a similar pattern to Azerbaijan's treatment of Armenians in Nakhchivan. The suppression of Armenian language and culture was widespread; many Armenian churches, cemeteries, and schools were closed or destroyed, clerics arrested, and Armenian historical education was banned. The Armenian educational institutions that remained were under the administration of the Azeri Ministry of Education, which enforced prohibitions against teaching Armenian history and using Armenian materials. Health clinics were restricted from Armenian villages and limited to Azerbaijani villages. Moreover, restrictions limited cultural exchanges and communication between Nagorno-Karabakh and Armenia, with significant neglect in transportation and communication infrastructure. In 1936, First Secretary of the Communist Party of Armenia Aghasi Khanjian was murdered by the deputy head (and soon head) of the NKVD Lavrentiy Beria after submitting Armenian grievances to Stalin, which included requests to return Nagorno-Karabakh and Nakhichevan to Armenia. The Azerbaijani government's decree in 1957 that Azerbaijani was to be the main language and the alteration of educational content to favor Azerbaijani history over Armenian exemplify the systemic efforts to assimilate the Armenian population culturally. The 1981 "law of the NKAR" denied additional rights, restricted cultural connections between Nagorno-Karabakh and Armenia, and removed provisions that had explicitly listed Armenian as a working language to be used by local authorities. In the 1960s, 1970s, and 1980s, Armenians protested against the cultural and economic marginalization they faced in the region.

== During the Karabakh Movement (1988-1992) ==
Motivated by fears of cultural and physical erasure under government policies from Azerbaijan, in 1988 Armenians launched a mass movement for reunification (Miatsum) with Armenia. This was met with extreme violence from Azerbaijani authorities and civilians, escalating tensions and culminating in the First Nagorno-Karabakh War.

Between 1988 and 1992, Azerbaijani authorities and civilians engaged in actions to accelerate the elimination of Armenians and settle Azerbaijanis in their place. Notable instances include pogroms in Sumgait (1988), Kirovabad (1988), and Baku (1990), as well as Operation Ring (1991), and the Maraga Massacre (1992). De Waal stated that the Popular Front of Azerbaijan (forerunner of the later Azerbaijani Popular Front Party) was responsible for the mass pogrom in Baku, as they shouted "Long live Baku without Armenians!"

Multiple sources state that the anti-Armenian pogroms in Azerbaijan involved elements of premeditation, such as the use of lists to target Armenians specifically and hand-made weapons. The perpetrators targeted the victims based solely on their Armenian ethnicity. The apartments of Armenians (which were marked in advance) were attacked and the residents were indiscriminately murdered, raped, and mutilated by the Azerbaijani rioters. Looting, arson and destruction of Armenian property was also perpetrated. Azerbaijani authorities took no action to stop the atrocities, and the failure to conduct a timely, thorough investigation or hold the perpetrators accountable, further escalated tensions. Many of those who participated in the massacre were later hailed by numerous Azeri demonstrators as national heroes. Following the devastating 1988 Spitak earthquake in Armenia, which killed tens of thousands, multiple countries sent humanitarian aid, while pianist Evgeny Kissin claimed that Azerbaijan sent only crutches and coffin nails.

The anti-Armenian violence between 1988 and 1992, described by Genocide Watch as a "campaign of terror," heightened fears of another Armenian genocide, leading to the flight of 350,000 Armenians from Azerbaijan. Russian political writer Roy Medvedev and USSR Journalists' Union described the events as a genocide of the Armenian population. Sociologist Donald E. Miller and historian Richard Hovannisian, note that the 1988 pogroms against Armenians, while horrific, only explained the mass flight of Armenians when seen as a precursor to genocide, as many who fled left behind well-established homes, jobs, and property. Gzoyan, Hochmann, and Meyroyan state that the pogroms "reflect a systematic pattern of ethnically motivated persecution, carried out under conditions of state tolerance and, in many cases, organizational involvement," adding that "these crimes may well show an intent to destroy the group as such, and qualify as attempted genocide." Many observers compared the plight of Armenians in Nagorno-Karabakh with those that were persecuted in Turkey and Azerbaijan during the Armenian Genocide. In 1989, Nobel Peace Prize laureate Andrei Sakharov wrote "the Armenian people are again facing the threat of genocide...for Nagorno-Karabakh this is a question of survival, for Azerbaijan—just a question of ambition."

In 1990, a group of 130 prominent academics — including Jacques Derrida, Isaiah Berlin, Alain Finkielkraut, Richard Rorty — published a letter condemning anti-Armenian violence in Azerbaijan. They warned that "flagrant violations of human rights a half century after the genocide of the Jewish people in Nazi concentration camps" reflected the enduring threat of racism and called for international action. Citing repeated attacks that "followed the same pattern," the signatories argued these were no "accidents or spontaneous outbursts," but that "crimes against the Armenian minority have become consistent practice – if not consistent policy – in Soviet Azerbaijan." Azeri academic Ziya Bunyadov, gained notoriety for his article "Why Sumgait?" in which he blamed the Armenian victims themselves for orchestrating the pogrom—a stance that led British journalist Thomas de Waal, to describe him as "Azerbaijan’s foremost Armenophobe."

In 1991, two groups of independent international experts visited the Caucasus and concluded that Azerbaijan was the primary aggressor in the conflict, aiming to ethnically cleanse Armenians from Nagorno-Karabakh. The experts cited several reasons for their conclusion: the brutal deportations, the blockades of Armenia and Nagorno-Karabakh, and the use of particular military equipment against civilians and civilian areas.

== Influence on Azerbaijani national identity ==
The formation of Azerbaijani nationalism is intertwined with historical conflicts with Armenians and anti-Armenian hostility – both during its founding years (1918-1920) and in its contemporary post-Soviet form. Multiple historians state that Azeri authorities used Soviet ethno-national policies and historical revisionism to promote a monolithic Azeri identity, assimilate ethno-religious minorities, and support expansionist claims over historically Armenian territories. The hostility of Azeris towards Armenians is inherited from the pan-Turkic ideologies of the Young Turks, the architects of the Armenian Genocide. Certain sources state that the origin of Azerbaijan as a nation state is fundamentally anti-Armenian and linked to the genocide of Armenians. According to Fyodor Lukyanov, editor-in-chief of the journal Russia in Global Affairs, "Armenophobia is the institutional part of the modern Azerbaijani statehood and Karabakh is in the center of it". According to historian Jeremy Smith, "National identity in post-Soviet Azerbaijan rests in large part, then, on the cult of the Aliyevs, alongside a sense of embattlement and victimisation and a virulent hatred of Armenia and Armenians."

Historian Dorfmann-Lazarev writes "the promotion of the Turkophone majority of Azerbaijan to the status of its unique titular nation was accompanied by the persecution of the populations of diverse ethnic origins long-established on the same territory" and that Soviet Azeri leaders "interpreted the republic as 'Azerbaijan for Muslims'," leading them to expel Armenians to barren lands devoid of essential resources. The ensuing historiography and identity of Azerbaijan, originally cultivated by Soviet authorities, and later by the Aliyev family, facilitated expansionist claims to Armenian territory as well as the ethnic and cultural erasure of Armenians.

Azerbaijan's inability to suppress the Karabakh Movement (1988-1991) escalated Azeri nationalism, described by multiple sources as institutionally anti-Armenian. Genocide Watch states that the "exclusionary ideology of the Aliyev regime" is a genocide risk factor for Armenians. According to the Lemkin Institute for Genocide Prevention, Soviet rule curbed "the genocidal anti-Armenianism of Azeri nationalists," but since Azerbaijan's independence, this hostility now runs unchecked. Historian Stephen Badalyan Riegg states that "the Aliyev dictatorship's revanchist, seemingly neo-imperial policy of conquest and displacement is accompanied by a primordialist agenda of erasing the physical evidence of long-standing Armenian life in Karabakh and other districts under Baku's expanding control...In Aliyev's zero-sum equation, Azerbaijani nationhood is incompatible with any tangible proof of Armenian historic presence."

Vladimir Kazimirov, the former Russian Representative for Nagorno-Karabakh and co-chairman of the OSCE Minsk Group, has stated that Azerbaijani state officials incite anti-Armenian sentiment, and characterized the decade following the conclusion of the 1994 ceasefire as follows:

Baku has actually started pursuing a policy of a total 'cold war' against the Armenians. All types of economic "dampers" as well as any contacts with the Armenians (even those on the societal level) are rejected from the very start and those who maintain these contacts are prosecuted. In the enlightened Soviet state someone would be quite willing to instill such sentiments as fundamentalism, revanchism and Armenophobia, which as such only prevent the elimination of both causes and consequences of the conflict. Currently there is growing fanaticism and extremism even on the level of non-governmental organizations.

In 2007, the leader of Azerbaijani national chess team, Teimour Radjabov, gave to a question on how he felt about playing against the Armenian team and he responded "the enemy is the enemy. We all have feelings of hate towards them." At the 2009 Eurovision contest, Azerbaijani security services summoned 43 Azerbaijanis who voted for Armenia at Eurovision for questioning, accusing them of lack of patriotism and "ethnic pride." In 2014, prominent human rights defenders Leyla Yunus and her husband Arif Yunus — who were known for actively pursuing reconciliation with Armenia — were detained by the authorities for allegedly spying for Armenia.

== In Azerbaijani media ==
"the Armenian genetic code contains no desire for peace — only terrorism, vandalism, aggression, and genocide."

— A broadcast on the state-run AzTV television channel on 6 April 2025

Azerbaijani national media and state officials routinely use eliminationist rhetoric and hate speech against Armenians, including negative caricatures — such as being untrustworthy, deceitful, culturally derivative, and cowardly, thereby reinforcing public prejudice.

In 2011, a report from the European Commission against Racism and Intolerance (ECRI) on Azerbaijan stated that "the constant negative official and media discourse" against Armenia fosters "a negative climate of opinion regarding people of Armenian origin, who remain vulnerable to discrimination." adding that Azerbaijani mainstream does not make "a clear distinction between that state and persons of Armenian origin coming under the jurisdiction of Azerbaijan." It further implicates certain TV channels, prominent citizens, politicians, and local and national authorities in the "fuel[ing of] negative feelings among society towards Armenians." According to the watchdog, anti-Armenian prejudice is so deeply built in people's conscience that describing someone as an Armenian may be considered as an insult so strong that it justifies initiating defamation lawsuits, which in some cases is true even if the person who is called that way is an Armenian.

According to Amnesty International, the Azerbaijani government targets journalists and activists, particularly those who advocate for peace with Armenia. Azeri journalist and human rights activist Arzu Geybullayeva received numerous threats in various social media circles stemming from Azerbaijan over her cooperation with the Armenian newspaper Agos. In 2024, Bahruz Samadov, Azeri political scientist and peace activist, was sentenced to 15 years on charges of treason. An outspoken advocate for peace with Armenia, he was targeted by the Azerbaijani government for his criticism of Azeri nationalism and of its anti-Armenian stance.

There is also wide media coverage of some statements made by Azerbaijani public figures and statesmen which demonstrate intolerance. For instance, in 2008, Allahshukur Pashazadeh, the religious leader (Grand Mufti) of the Caucasus Muslims made a statement that "falsehood and betrayal are in the Armenian blood." Degrading rhetoric from high-level leaders has seeped into Azerbaijani society. In a nationwide address in September 2020, President Aliyev's phrase "Azerbaijani soldiers drive [Armenians] away like dogs." became extremely popular across Azerbaijani social media. Nurlan Ibrahimov, the public relations and media manager of an Azerbaijani football club said, "We must kill Armenians. No matter whether a woman, a child, an old man. We must kill everyone we can and whoever happens (sic). We should not feel sorry; we should not feel pity. If we do not kill (them), our children will be killed."

== Indoctrination in schools ==
An Azerbaijani website surveyed experts who acknowledged the presence of Armenophobia in Azerbaijani textbooks, with many of them justifying it. The Azerbaijani historian Arif Yunus has stated that various Azerbaijani school textbooks label Armenians with epithets such as "bandits", "aggressors", "treacherous", and "hypocritical". The historian also states that patriotic education is a prominent theme in Azerbaijani education, rooted in the ideology of combating enemies—primarily portrayed as Armenians—and emphasizes a readiness to die for the homeland and engage in a "heroic struggle" against adversaries. He and his wife were jailed for allegedly spying for Armenia.

One prominent example is the story titled Armenian, authored by Elkhan Zeynalli — a member of the Union of Azerbaijani Writers — and named “Story of the Year” in 2008 by Azerbaijan’s Ministry of Youth and Sports. This story, which fosters Armenophobic sentiments, is incorporated into Azerbaijan’s school curriculum for home reading. In this story, Armenians are depicted in overwhelmingly negative terms, with multiple instances of dehumanizing language that include phrases such as "blood-sucker," "double-faced," "kill all Armenian dogs," "rape all Armenian women," and "strangle the Armenian children."

Yasemin Kilit Aklar in her study titled Nation and History in Azerbaijani School Textbooks comes to the following conclusion:

Azerbaijani official textbooks misuse history to encourage hatred and feelings of ethnic and national superiority. The Armenians... are presented as historical enemies and derided in very strong language. [The fifth grade history textbook by] Ata Yurdu stimulates direct hostility to Armenians and Russians. Even if the efforts to establish peace in Nagorno-Karabagh are successful, how can it be expected to survive? How can a new generation live with Armenians in peaceful coexistence after being inculcated with such prejudices? As of now, the civic nationalism that Azerbaijani officials speak of appears to be a distant myth or a mere rhetorical device.

== Historical negationism ==
The Azeri revisionist steamroller takes many forms: irreversible destruction, degradation (Armenian cupolas modified, Armenian inscriptions erased, crosses removed), reassignment (churches become mosques), reappropriation through outright denial of its Armenian origins.

— The European Center for Law and Justice,

Multiple observers — including those from government, genocide experts, and others — state that Azerbaijan engages in historical revisionism to support its territorial claims, deprive Armenians of their own territorial claims. and eliminate traces of historical Armenian presence. This has involved the organized denial, and falsification of history, alongside the erasure of Armenian cultural heritage sites, and place-names. as well as the imposition of a state monopoly over Armenian cultural studies, which limits independent research and enforces official narratives. Petrosyan et al. state that Azerbaijan's use of historical falsification aim "to neutralize the Armenian identity of Artsakh."

Under Mir Cəfər Bağırov's leadership as First Secretary of the Azeri SSR, efforts began to erase the historical Armenian presence in Azerbaijan and elevate the Azeri majority to the sole titular nation. Anti-Armenian historical revisionism developed in the 1950-1960s, and promoted the false narrative that Azerbaijanis are descendants of the indigenous Caucasian Albanians. These revisions, driven by Soviet and later post-Soviet nationalism, contributed to ethnic tensions and paved the way for the ethnic cleansing of Armenians. In certain instances, Azeri historiography explicitly prohibits mentions of Armenians, with the intention of erasing the historical presence of Armenians. Arsène Saparov, Caucasus expert, states that "the persistent Azerbaijani policy of denial of the Armenian presence and cultural heritage in the Caucasus...has been institutionalized since Ilham Aliyev became president."

Genocide scholars Edita Gzoyan et al. wrote "we are witnessing a systematic, scholarly, political, and military attempt to de-Armenize the land, its names, geography, and history. This process resembles Lemkin’s notion of genocide—the destruction of the national pattern of the targeted group and the imposition of the national pattern of the oppressor." Analysts have observed that Azerbaijan is distinct from other genocidaires insofar as it not only attempts to erase the history of Armenians in the Caucasus but denies their very existence, thereby attempting to minimize the nature of the crime. The European Centre for Law and Justice states "to accomplish complete cultural erasure, Azerbaijan has gone beyond merely destroying Armenian heritage—Azerbaijan is also denying it ever existed," adding that "Azerbaijan seeks to erase...even the memory of the Armenian people."

Alexandra Xanthaki, the UN Special Rapporteur in the field of cultural rights expressed concern over the "ongoing pattern of destruction and appropriation of Armenian historically, culturally, and religiously significant sites and objects....[including]...the organised reinterpretation of the history of Nagorno-Karabakh to erase the traces of the presence of Armenians," adding concern that the "allegations that the combined attacks to people, monuments and symbols, the falsification of the historical narrative and erasure of place names...may amount to cultural cleansing."

=== Destruction of cultural heritage ===
Azerbaijan has systematically destroyed Armenian heritage sites in Nakhichevan, Nagorno-Karabakh, and elsewhere.

According to the US Department of Justice:

Despite the constitutional guarantees against religious discrimination, numerous acts of vandalism against the Armenian Apostolic Church have been reported throughout Azerbaijan. These acts are clearly connected to anti-Armenian sentiments brought to the surface by the war between Armenia and Azerbaijan.

In Nakhichevan, the destruction took place years after the ceasefire in Nagorno-Karabakh in a non-combat zone, and in a disputed territory. Starting in 1998, Azerbaijan began embarking on a campaign of destroying a cemetery of Armenian khachkar carvings in a cemetery in Julfa, Nakhichevan. Several appeals were filed by both Armenian and international organizations, condemning the Azerbaijani government and calling on it to desist from such activity. In 2006, Azerbaijan barred members of the European Parliament from investigating the claims. In the spring of 2006, a visiting journalist from the Institute for War and Peace Reporting reported that no visible traces of the Armenian cemetery remained. In the same year, photographs taken from Iran showed that the cemetery site had been turned into a military firing range. Arif Yunus, an exiled Azerbaijani historian and activist, argues that the Aliyev regime’s "cultural genocide" in Nakhichevan—and its ability to get away with such erasure—serves as a show of force meant to weaken and intimidate domestic opposition.

As a response to Azerbaijan barring on-site investigation by outside groups, on 8 December 2010, the American Association for the Advancement of Science (AAAS) released an analysis of high-resolution satellite photographs of the Armenian Julfa cemetery site taken in 2003 and 2009. The AAAS concluded that the satellite imagery was consistent with the reports from observers on the ground, that "significant destruction and changes in the grade of the terrain" had occurred between 2003 and 2009, and that the cemetery area was "likely destroyed and later leveled by earth-moving equipment."

In 2019, Azerbaijan's destruction of Armenian cultural heritage was described as "the worst cultural genocide of the 21st century" in Hyperallergic, exceeding the destruction of cultural heritage by ISIL. The devastation included 89 medieval churches, 5,840 intricate cross-stones, and 22,000 tombstones. An investigation by the organization Caucasus Heritage Watch described Azerbaijan’s destruction of Armenian heritage within Nakhichevan as a "striking portrait of cultural erasure that, in its surgical precision, totality, and surreptitiousness, has few parallels." The research program stated that there was “conclusive forensic evidence that silent and systematic cultural erasure has been a feature of Azerbaijan’s domestic ethnic policies" adding that "by 2011, all physical traces of Armenians in Nakhichevan were effectively gone, with rare exceptions appearing to have resulted from oversight rather than intent."

In 2020 during the second Nagorno-Karabakh War, Azerbaijani forces shelled the historical 19th century Ghazanchetsots Cathedral in Shusha, which was the seat of the Diocese of Artsakh of the Armenian Apostolic Church. During the war, a group of genocide scholars issued a statement on the "imminent genocidal threat deriving from Azerbaijan and Turkey," adding that the destruction of Armenian cultural heritage was consistent with the "policy of the cultural genocide" that Azerbaijan had implemented over the past 30 years in Nakhichevan. In addition, the scholars stated that "a case can be made that there is conspiracy to commit genocide, direct and public incitement to commit genocide, and [an] attempt to commit genocide." An article from Cultural Property News stated that "the vast scale and deliberate nature of the elimination of Armenian heritage by Azerbaijani officials makes clear that it is not an accident of war but a state-sponsored attempt to eliminate a people’s history."

Following Nagorno-Karabakh's de facto incorporation into Azerbaijan following a military offensive in 2003, the Azerbaijani government has undertaken a campaign of Turkification and the destruction of Armenian cultural sites, which aims at denying Armenians' historical presence and justifying their expulsion. Historian Vincent Duclert, states that "the long-drawn-out genocide to which the Armenians have been subjected is leading now not only to the disappearance of the Armenian population in Nagorno-Karabakh (Artsakh)...but to the eradication of all evidence of their habitation there over millennia."

== Glorification of violence ==
Azerbaijani authorities have glorified acts of violence against Armenians, including by granting awards or other privileges to individuals responsible for such atrocities. Viktor Krivopuskov, who previously served as an officer of the Ministry of Internal Affairs of the USSR and a member of a peacekeeping mission in Nagorno-Karabakh gives the following assessment of Azerbaijan's current state policy:

"The criminals are promoted to the rank of heroes, monuments are erected on their burial places, which comes to prove that the government of Azerbaijan actually continues the policy of genocide which was initiated at the end of the 19th and at the beginning of the 20th centuries."

In 2004, the Azerbaijani lieutenant Ramil Safarov murdered Armenian lieutenant Gurgen Markaryan in his sleep at a Partnership for Peace NATO program in Hungary. In 2006, Safarov was sentenced to life imprisonment in Hungary with a minimum incarceration period of 30 years. In 2012, after his request under the Strasbourg convention he was extradited to Azerbaijan, where he was greeted as a hero by a huge crowd, pardoned by the Azerbaijani president despite contrary assurances made to Hungary, promoted to the rank of major, given an apartment, and eight years of back pay. The Ombudsperson of Azerbaijan stated that Ramil Safarov "should become an exemplary model of patriotism for the Azerbaijani youth." Armenia cut all diplomatic ties with Hungary after this incident. The Government of Azerbaijan reportedly offered to buy 2-4 billion dollars of Hungarian sovereign bonds in order to secure the release of the convicted murderer. On 19 September 2013, President Aliyev stated that "Azerbaijan has returned Ramil Safarov—its officer to homeland, given him freedom and restored the justice." Amnesty International noted that Azerbaijan’s treatment of Safarov following his extradition suggest that "Margaryan’s brutal murder based on his ethnicity was, retroactively, a state-sponsored hate crime."

In 2016, Azerbaijani President Aliyev awarded a medal to an Azerbaijani soldier who had beheaded 19-year-old Artsakh soldier Kyaram Sloyan and shared photos on social media showing himself with Sloyan’s severed head. In 2022, Azerbaijani soldier Gardashkhan Abishov — investigated for abusing Armenian soldiers and sharing a video of the mutilation of a female service member — was nonetheless awarded by President Aliyev for "protecting Azerbaijan's borders."

== Torture ==
Multiple human rights advocates, including former UN officials have stated that Azerbaijani forces have tortured ethnic Armenian civilians and prisoners of war. Human rights organizations – including the Lemkin Institute, the IAGS, and the University Network for Human Rights state that Azerbaijani forces have used torture with genocidal motives. A 2024 fact-finding mission jointly prepared by Freedom House and other organizations documented torture, physical abuse, and degrading treatment of Armenian captives: concluding that Azerbaijan's actions satisfied the criteria for "ethnic cleansing." During Azerbaijan’s 2023 offensive in Nagorno-Karabakh, the Lemkin Institute issued a genocide warning, stating that "Azerbaijan has committed atrocities against almost all Armenian civilians and POWs it has captured in the wars of 2016, 2020 and 2022."

In numerous instances Armenian captives were forced to declare "Karabakh is Azerbaijan" while undergoing torture and killed while wrapped in the flags of Artsakh, indicating an ethnic dimension of these actions against Armenians. Other forms of abuse, including physical and psychological torture, lack of hygiene, inadequate medical care, extreme temperatures, and insufficient food and water, have been reported to occur in secret detention phases. Incidents of torture, presented by Armenia at the International Court of Justice (ICJ) and the United Nations Security Council (UNSC), have been cited as evidence that Azerbaijan targets Armenians based on their ethnicity. In December 2021, following concern from multiple UN officials, the ICJ ordered Azerbaijan to protect Armenian detainees from violence and uphold their rights in accordance with international law. In September 2022, the UN CERD issued a report expressing concern about allegations of grave human rights violations committed during and after the 2020 Nagorno-Karabakh War by Azerbaijani military forces against Armenians – including extrajudicial executions, torture, and other ill-treatment and arbitrary detention.

Azerbaijani forces have filmed the mutilation of bodies, engaging in gruesome acts such as chopping off limbs, severing heads, carving messages into torsos, and spreading the documentation on social media. Azerbaijani forces have used these tactics as tools of psychological warfare aimed at terrorizing the Armenian population into leaving. An instance which attracted media attention was that of Anush Apetyan, an Armenian soldier who was tortured, mutilated, and raped during Azerbaijan’s invasion of Armenia in 2022. Videos emerged online of Azerbaijani soldiers celebrating and mocking her mutilated body. Both Juan Mendez (the first UN Special Advisor on the Prevention of Genocide) and Anahit Manasyan (the Human Rights Ombudsman of Armenia) reported that bodies returned to Armenia after Azerbaijan's 2023 military assault bore signs of torture and mutilation.

== Extrajudicial executions ==
On 4 April, during the 2016 Armenian–Azerbaijani clashes, it was reported that Azerbaijani forces decapitated an Armenian soldier of Yezidi origin, Karam Sloyan, with videos and pictures of his severed head posted on social networks.

During and following the 2020 Nagorno-Karabakh War, Azeri forces carried out extrajudicial executions of Armenian civilians and prisoners of war (POWs). One video shows two Azerbaijani soldiers beheading an elderly Armenian as he is begging for his life by repeatedly saying "For the sake of Allah." After the Armenian was decapitated, the victim's head was placed on the nearby carcass of a pig. The men then addressed the dead body in Azerbaijani, saying, "you have no honour, this is how we take revenge for the blood of our martyrs," and, "this is how we get revenge — by cutting heads." Human Rights Watch documented the physical abuse of Armenian prisoners of war by their Azerbaijani captors, noting that most of the perpetrators showed no fear of accountability, as their faces were clearly visible in the videos.

These extrajudicial executions have been characterized by various sources as acts of ethnic cleansing. Genocide Watch and various UN officials, including the U.N. Committee against Torture (CAT), have expressed concern over the ethnic dimension of these executions. The Lemkin Institute for Genocide Prevention noted that Azerbaijan’s escalating human rights violations against Armenians—including extrajudicial executions— may represent acts preparatory to genocide and align with the UN’s Genocide Risk Factor 7.

Many victims were elderly or disabled who could not flee, making them especially vulnerable. An investigation by University Network for Human Rights corroborated 150 cases of extrajudicial executions, with the majority of them occurring after the 2020 Nagorno-Karabakh War. Human rights advocates stated that the widespread nature of extrajudicial executions, often broadcast on social media by Azeri soldiers, suggests a systematic practice aimed at instilling fear among the population, and humiliating the families of the deceased.

== Restrictions on entry and right of return ==
Azerbaijan bars entry to anyone with an Armenian-sounding names — even those who are not ethnically or nationally Armenian — and denies the right of return to former Armenian residents who have fled. Regardless of one's citizenship, possessing an Armenian-sounding name is dangerous. In one case, an Armenian woman was abducted after she attempted to return to Shushi to collect her belongings following the 2020 Nagorno-Karabakh ceasefire agreement. Multiple human rights observers, and government officials, including from the United Nations, ICJ, Switzerland, and the European Parliament, have called on Azerbaijan to ensure the rights of former Armenian residents to return safely to their homeland. Amnesty International stated that "the right [of ethnic Armenians] to remain in their own homes and other rights should not be made conditional on accepting Azerbaijani citizenship."

In 2011, Diana Markosian, a journalist of American and Russian citizenship, was prevented from entering Azerbaijan due to her Armenian ethnicity. Zafer Noyan, an ethnic Turkish professional arm-wrestler, was barred from entering Azerbaijan because his last name looked Armenian. In May 2016, an eight-year-old Russian boy, Luka Vardanyan, was detained for several hours and denied entry into Azerbaijan during a school trip, while his classmates were allowed through, due to his Armenian surname. In 2017 Russia formally complained to Azerbaijan, stating that 25 Russian citizens were barred from entering Azerbaijan because of their Armenian names. In 2019, Azerbaijani officials barred the entry of Russian citizen Kristina Gevorkyan. In 2021, Nobel Arustamyan, a Russian journalist and football commentator of Armenian descent, was denied accreditation for UEFA Euro 2020 at the request of Azerbaijan.

In addition to denying entry of people for their Armenian ethnicity, Azerbaijan considers blacklists people (personae non gratae), if they have previously visited the former Republic of Artsakh (Nagorno-Karabakh) without a visa from the Azerbaijani government. Azerbaijan considered entering these territories through Armenia a violation of its visa and migration policy. Foreign citizens who enter these territories were permanently banned from entering Azerbaijan and were included on the list of people who are personae non gratae by the Ministry of Foreign Affairs of Azerbaijan.

== Precarity of Armenians remaining within Azerbaijan ==
"It is clear that Armenians are the target of violence from societal forces and that the Azerbaijani government is unable or in some instances unwilling to control the violence or acts of discrimination and harassment...Armenian inhabitants of Azerbaijan will have no guarantees of physical safety."

— United States Immigration and Naturalization Service (1993),

Around 500,000 Armenians lived in Soviet Azerbaijan before the Karabakh Movement began in 1988, but waves of anti-Armenian violence in the 1990s and a military offensive in 2023 forced nearly all of them to flee. The Armenians that remain in Azerbaijan face an uncertain and deeply marginalized existence. The European Commission against Racism and Intolerance (ECRI) identifies Armenians as "the most vulnerable group in Azerbaijan," often regarded as "second-class citizens" Most Armenians live in virtual hiding, having changed their Armenian names and surnames to Azerbaijani ones to avoid harassment and violence. Newborns in Azerbaijan are also prohibited from receiving Armenian-sounding surnames, even if the names are not actually Armenian.

Privately, some Armenians who live in Azerbaijan report enduring human rights violations but remain silent publicly out of fear. Sources estimate that between a handful to as many as 3000 Armenians remain in Azerbaijan outside of Nagorno-Karabakh, most of whom are either married to Azerbaijanis or are of mixed Armenian-Azerbaijani descent. Minority Rights Group International considers the official 2009 census figure of 30,000 to be "almost certainly an exaggeration."

The handful of Armenians who stayed behind in Nagorno-Karabakh after 99.9% of the population fled in 2023 are believed to be elderly or disabled, and Azerbaijan has confiscated their passports and monitors their communications. Another particularly vulnerable subgroup—estimated at 645 individuals (36 men and 609 women)—is not of mixed heritage or intermarried. More than half live in Baku. These individuals are also thought to be elderly and sick and probably have no family members. A 1993 report from the US INS states that Armenians were denied exit visas from Azerbaijan after being removed from the country's resident registry. According to a 2011 report by the ECRI, "people of Armenian origin are at risk of being discriminated against in their daily lives." Many hide their identity, with some born to mixed families choosing "to use the name of their Azerbaijani parent so as to avoid problems in their contacts with officialdom."

== Arbitrary arrest and detention ==
Since 2020, Azerbaijan has detained over 160 Armenians, including civilians, former soldiers, and leaders of Nagorno-Karabakh. It is a common practice for Azerbaijan to arbitrarily detain civilians. Arbitrary arrests and detentions of Armenians have occurred within territories acquired by Azerbaijan following the 2020 Nagorno-Karabakh War, within internationally recognized Armenian territory, and within areas of the Armenia-Azerbaijani border.

A fact-finding mission jointly conducted by multiple human rights organizations concluded, "in all documented instances of civilian detention...Azerbaijani authorities failed to provide justifiable grounds, rendering these detentions arbitrary under both IHL [International Humanitarian Law] and IHRL [International Human Rights Law]." Multiple human rights organizations and experts condemned Azerbaijan for its detention of Armenians in Nagorno-Karabakh, describing the actions as a "war crime," illegal, or considering the charges to be fabricated to support sham trials.

The European Parliament, Nobel Prize laureates, business leaders, former heads of state, and humanitarians have called on Azerbaijan to release Armenians who have been arrested. Other human rights advocates stated that the incarceration of Armenians from Nagorno-Karabakh, including their leaders, is genocidal or aims to legitimize the ethnic cleansing of the region. A fact-finding mission carried out by Freedom House and other human rights organizations concluded that — together with other actions — Azerbaijan’s practice of arbitrary arrest and detention of civilians “meet the criteria for ethnic cleansing as understood in the context of the former Yugoslavia conflict.”

== Sexual violence ==
Azeri forces have committed sexual violence against Armenian women during the Nagorno-Karabakh conflict, — during the anti-Armenian pogroms (1988-1992), Operation Ring, — and amid Azerbaijan’s incursions within internationally recognized Armenian territory. In 2022, an Azeri diplomat threatened to rape Armenian women who were in Washington, DC protesting Azerbaijan's incursions into Armenian territory. During Azerbaijan’s final military offensive on Nagorno-Karabakh in 2023, messages circulated on social media that encouraged the rape and murder of Armenian women.

Threats and acts of sexual violence have been interpreted as deliberate measures aimed at facilitating ethnic erasure. The use, threats, and dissemination of sexual violence in media by Azerbaijani forces' instilled fear in the Armenian community of Nagorno-Karabakh and according to the University Human Rights Network, was "reinforced by incitement to hatred in official discourse and propaganda...[which]...all but guaranteed the mass exodus of Armenians from Nagorno-Karabakh." These practices raised concerns about a systematic intent behind them, potentially meeting criteria under international conventions on genocide and crimes against humanity.

== Official statements ==
Azerbaijani officials have threatened to eliminate Armenians from the Caucasus on multiple occasions as well as denied and condoned the historical elimination of Armenians. Multiple sources including genocide studies experts, and political observers interpret this rhetoric as revealing genocidal intent or incitement to genocide. Certain scholars state that the language employed by Azeri authorities — including the description of Armenians as "dogs" and as "leftovers of the sword" — is reminiscent of language used by the Young Turks during the Armenian Genocide. The hate speech is not new but has worsened since 2020. Henry Theriault, genocide scholar, writes "any reasonable analysis of the statements and actions by Azerbaijan and Turkey show the present campaign of conquest and destruction to be an extension of the unfinished Armenian Genocide of 1915."

=== Statements by President Ilham Aliyev ===
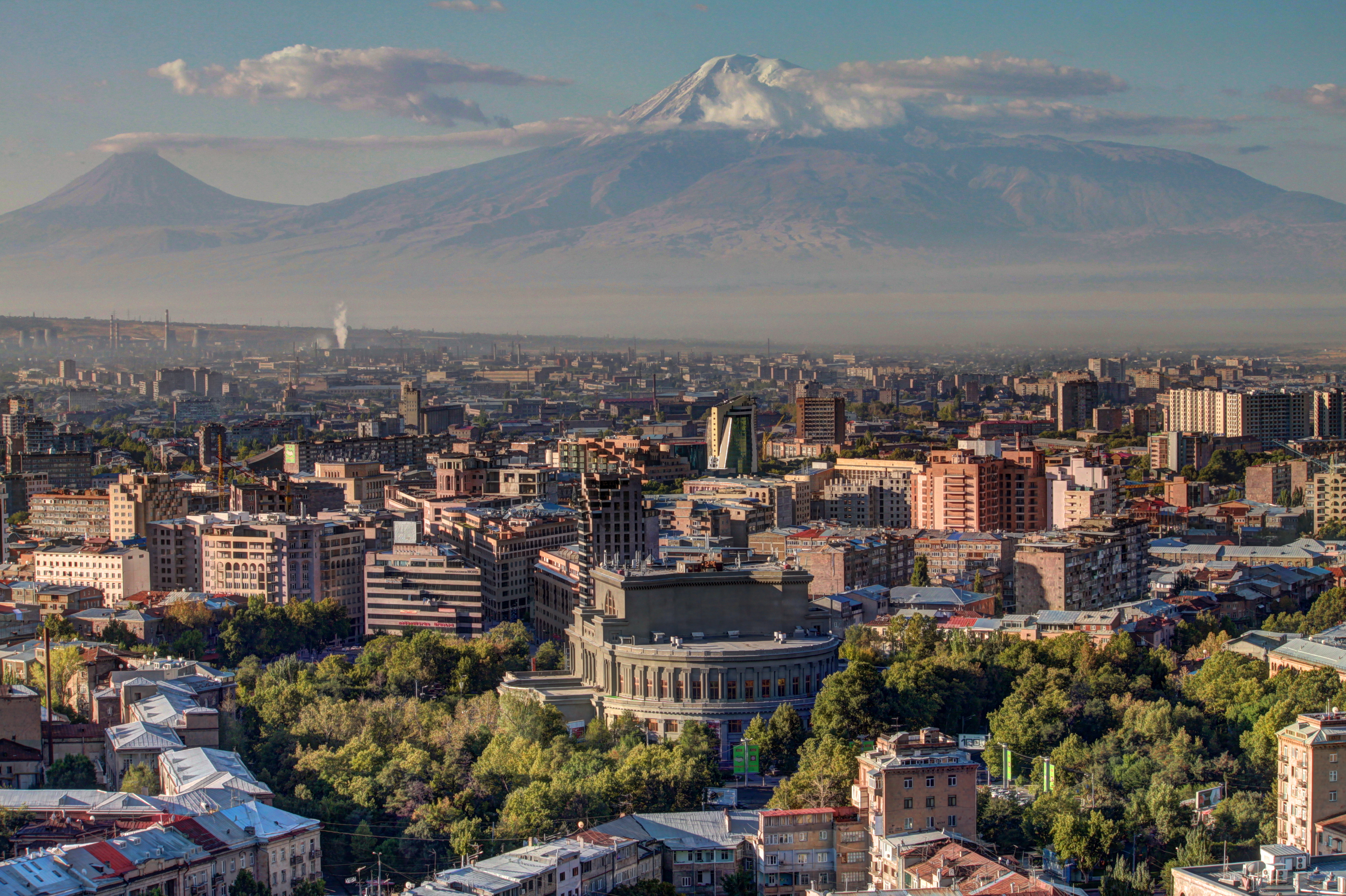
President Ilham Aliyev repeatedly claims that the capital of Armenia— Yerevan —"was a gift to the Armenians."

Naira Sahakyan, genocide scholar, states that the rhetoric of Azeri President Ilham Aliyev, displays "genocidal thinking" against Armenians: including racism, expansionist territorial claims that deny Armenians historic presence, cults of antiquity that mythologize an Azerbaijan free of Armenians, and cults of cultivation that contrast Azeris as "hard-working" to Armenians as "destroyers." Critics have condemned Azeri President Aliyev’s dehumanizing characterizations of ethnic Armenians as "rats," "dogs," "devils," "terrorists," "fascists," “usurping interlopers," as well as "barbarians and vandals."

On 28 February 2012, during his closing speech at a widely reported conference Azerbaijani President Ilham Aliyev stated,

"our main enemies are Armenians of the world and the hypocritical and corrupt politicians under their control."

In November 2012, Aliyev launched a twitter rant where he made anti-Armenian and expansionist claims to Armenian territory:

"Our main enemy is the Armenian lobby ... Armenia as a country is of no value. It is actually a colony, an outpost run from abroad, a territory artificially created on ancient Azerbaijani lands."

In April 2023, amid Azerbaijan's ongoing blockade of the Republic of Artsakh, President Aliyev said:

"I am sure that the majority of the Armenian population living in Karabakh today is ready to accept Azerbaijani citizenship. It’s just that these leeches, these wild animals, the separatists [referring to the officials of the de facto Republic of Artsakh] don’t allow it."

=== Statements by other Azeri officials ===
In the weeks prior to Azerbaijan’s final offensive on Nagorno-Karabakh, Elchin Amirbeyov – the representative of the Azeri president – warned that "a genocide may happen" if the local self-proclaimed Armenian government did not surrender. The former President of Azerbaijan, Heydar Aliyev, stated in a 1999 speech: "In times of trouble, the people of Azerbaijan saw the help of Turkey and the Turkish people and is grateful for that. Particularly, in 1918-1919, during the struggle for independence under the leadership of the great Atatürk, who cleansed his land of Armenians and other enemies, the Turkish people and Turkey offered their help to Azerbaijan, to Nakhchivan."

In response to a March 2023 resolution released by the EU parliament which condemned Azerbaijan's invasion of Armenia in September, Azerbaijan's parliament accused MEPs of being influenced by "Armenia and the Armenian diaspora, long since a cancerous tumor of Europe." Former Azerbaijani parliamentarian, lman Mammadov, said "Turkey and Azerbaijan could together wipe Armenia off the face of the Earth at a blow, and the Armenians should beware of that thought."

=== Armenian genocide denial ===
Azerbaijan and Turkey are among two countries which officially deny the Armenian Genocide and glorify previous genocidal acts against Armenians. Former President of Azerbaijan Heydar Aliyev stated "In history there was never such a thing as the ‘Armenian genocide,’ and even if there had been, it would be wrong to raise the matter after 85 years." His son and current President Ilham Aliyev tweeted that "Turkey and Azerbaijan work in a coordinated manner to dispel the myth of the 'Armenian genocide' in the world."

Eldad Aharon, foreign policy analyst, states that Turkey's denial of the Armenian Genocide is "fundamental to Azerbaijan's national identity," reinforcing their solidarity within the "one nation, two states" framework. Vicken Cheterian states that the conflict between Armenia and Azerbaijan is deeply influenced by the denial of the Armenian Genocide. Human rights advocates have also criticized Azerbaijan for denying contemporary violence against Armenians. Roxanne Makasdjian, executive director of The Genocide Education Project, has stated that "Turkey and Azerbaijan collaborate in a policy of denying the Armenian genocide" in order to erase Armenia and "pave the way for a large ‘Pan-Turkic’ bloc'."

Henry Theriault states that in Turkish and Azeri society denial coexists with the celebration of genocidal acts because there is no accountability: “in such situations, denial is inverted into celebratory or invective declaration...Thus, Turkey’s president Recep Tayyip Erdoğan’s supporters can make explicit statements about completing the genocide of 1915 to eliminate all Armenians, referred to...by Erdoğan as 'leftovers of the sword[s]' that were swung one hundred five years ago...”

=== Symbolism ===
Critics state that anti-Armenian symbolism, including stamps depicting the “extermination” of Armenians in hazmat suits a military trophy park that mocks and degrade Armenian soldiers, and narratives that mythologize an Armenian-free Azerbaijan, all serve as signals of genocidal intent. Freedom House states that President Ilham Aliyev's rhetoric such as "the Novruz bonfire is also doing the final cleansing" after the expulsion of Armenians from Nagorno-Karabakh reflects the intent to remove Armenians from the region. Commenting on the Azerbaijan’s anti-Armenian symbolism, International lawyer Karnig Kerkonian describes states, "Frankly, it is unclear what else Baku has to do to telegraph to the world its intention to eliminate the Artsakh Armenians." Alexander Galitsky of the ANCA asserts that "not since Nazi Germany has such a blatant example of genocidal symbolism been deployed so brazenly by a state actor."

==== "Azerbaijan 2020" stamp ====
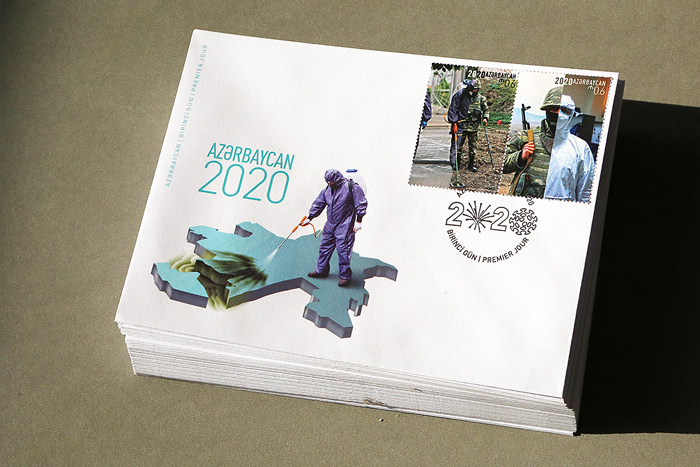
The stamp with the accompanying illustration showing a specialist "disinfecting" Nagorno-Karabakh

On 30 December 2020 Azermarka, which works under the Ministry of Transport, Communication and High Technologies of Azerbaijan, issued "Azerbaijan 2020" postage stamps, which according to the Ministry, were dedicated to the significant events of 2020: the COVID-19 pandemic and the Second Nagorno-Karabakh War. Postage stamps were provided with an accompanying illustration showing a disinfection specialist standing over an Azerbaijan map and fumigating the area of Nagorno-Karabakh, seemingly depicting ethnic Armenians in the area as a virus in need of "eradicating". This sparked outrage on social media and accusations of anti-Armenian sentiment.

==== Military Trophy Park ====
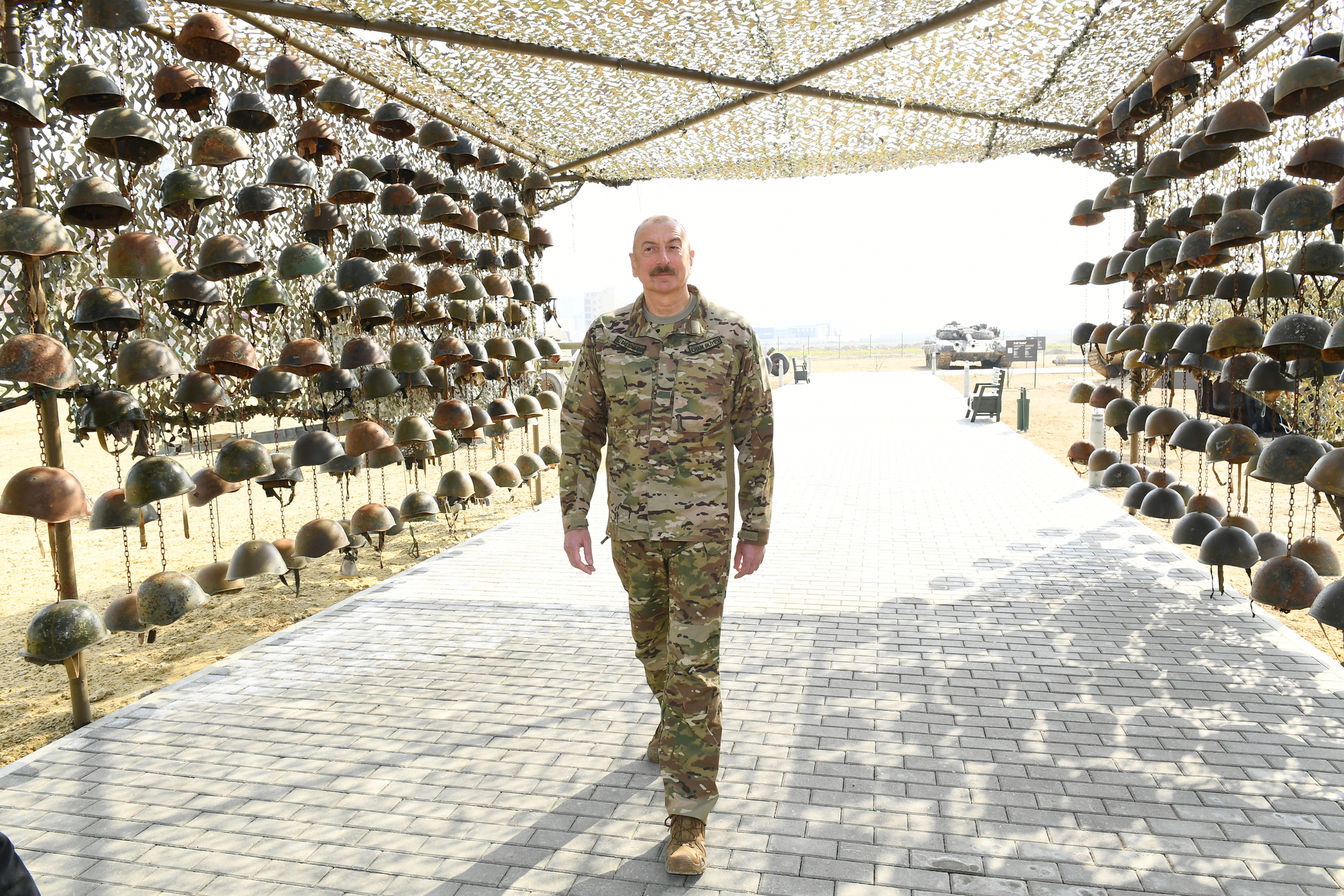
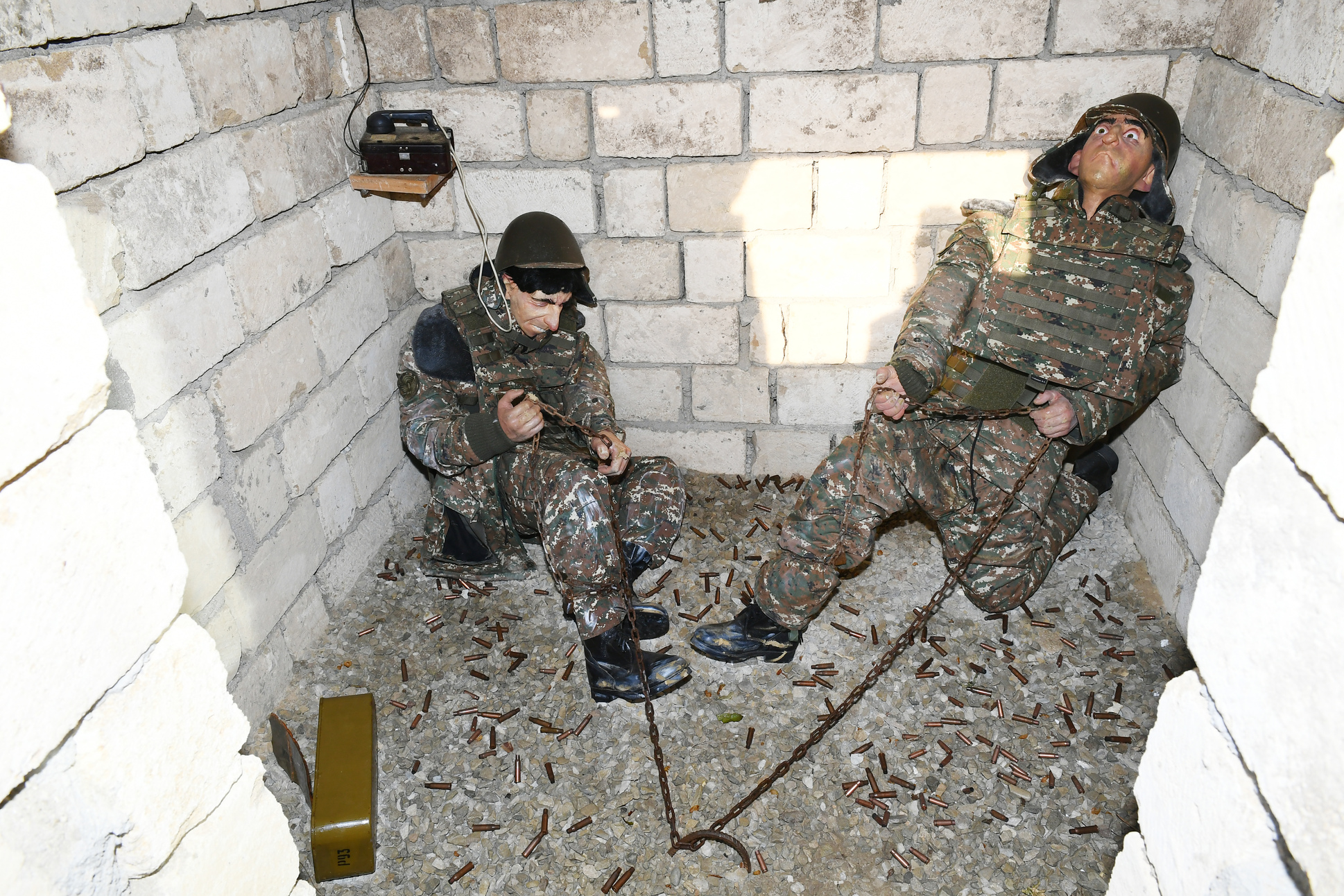
Helmets of deceased Armenian troops and wax mannequins of captured Armenian soldiers of 2020 Nagorno-Karabakh war showcased at Baku military park. President Ilham Aliyev shown in the first image during a visit to the park.

Following the 2020 war, the Military Trophy Park was opened in Baku, showcasing the helmets of dead Armenian soldiers, as well as wax mannequins of them. Armenia strongly condemned it accusing Baku for "dishonoring the memory of victims of the war, missing persons and prisoners of war and violating the rights and dignity of their families". The Human Rights Defender of Armenia, the country's ombudsman, called it a "clear manifestation of fascism," saying that it is a "proof of Azerbaijani genocidal policy and state supported Armenophobia." Furthermore, in a resolution, the European Parliament said that the park may be perceived as a glorification of violence (by Azerbaijan) and risks inciting further hostile sentiment, hate speech or even inhumane treatment of remaining POWs and other Armenian captive civilians kept by Azerbaijan in violation of the 2020 Nagorno-Karabakh ceasefire agreement, thereby perpetuating the atmosphere of hatred and contradicting any official statements on reconciliation. The EU Parliament also added that they deplore the opening of the military park and urged its immediate closure, saying it would deepen the long-lasting hostilities and further decrease trust between the nations.

The Lemkin Institute characterized the Trophy Park as "one of the most openly and unapologetically racist acts of the 21st century."

== Azerbaijani boycott of goods and services linked to Armenians ==
In 2008, under pressure from Azerbaijan's state-owned airline AZAL, the Dutch ticketing company Kales Airline Services was forced to fire an employee solely because of her Armenian ethnicity. AZAL had threatened to end its partnership with the ticketing company if any ethnic Armenians continued to sell their tickets.

Azerbaijani social media users have also launched boycotts against international companies perceived as siding with Armenia or challenging Azerbaijan's stance on the Nagorno-Karabakh conflict, with McDonald’s and Johnson & Johnson among the most prominent targets. McDonald’s faced backlash after its U.S. branch removed a post by its Azerbaijani division showing a map asserting "Karabakh is Azerbaijan," while Johnson & Johnson was criticized for using the Armenian name "Artsakh" for the region. These boycotts, sparked by controversial social media posts, quickly gained traction online and translated into visible consumer action, such as protests and store bans.

In July 2020, a major Azerbaijani-owned distribution hub in Moscow, blocked 50 truckloads of Armenian apricots; the tensions resulted in violence with at least 25 people were arrested in a mass brawl where attackers targeted cars with Armenian license plates, and one Armenian man was stabbed.

In 2025, Azerbaijani authorities publicly destroyed Armenian-made goods, including books, cognac, and souvenirs. In one case, a book on Nagorno-Karabakh that an Azerbaijani journalist brought into Azerbaijan was confiscated and marked as "extremist literature."

== Reaction ==
=== Armenia ===
In 2011, President of Armenia Serzh Sargsyan in his speech at the United Nations General Assembly said:

Baku has turned Armenophobia into state propaganda, at a level that is far beyond dangerous. It is not only our assessment; the alarm has also been sounded by international structures specializing in combating racism and intolerance. Even more dangerously, Armenophobic ideas are spread among the young Azerbaijani generation, imperiling the future of peaceful coexistence.

In May 2011, Shavarsh Kocharyan, the Armenian Deputy Foreign Affairs Minister, suggested a connection between the high level of anti-Armenian sentiment in Azerbaijan and the low level of democracy in that country, stating that: "Azerbaijan's leadership could find no factor to unite his people around the hereditary regime except the simple Armenophobia."

On 7 October 2008, the Armenian Foreign Affairs Ministry statement for the OSCE's Office for Democratic Institutions and Human Rights claimed that "anti-Armenian propaganda is becoming more and more the essential part of Azerbaijan's official policy." The statement blamed the Azerbaijani government for "developing and implementing large-scale propaganda campaign, disseminating racial hatred and prejudice against Armenians. Such behaviour of the Azerbaijani authorities creates a serious threat to regional peace and stability" and compared Azerbaijan with Nazi Germany stating "one cannot but draw parallels with the largely similar anti-Jewish hysteria in the Third Reich in the 1930s and early 1940s, where all the above-mentioned elements of explicit racial hatred were also evident."

The Armenian side also claimed that the Azerbaijani government "actively uses academic circles" for "distortion and re-writing of historic facts." It also accused Azerbaijan for "vandalism against Armenian cultural monuments and cemeteries in the lands historically inhabited by Armenians, as well as against Armenian Genocide memorials throughout the world" and called the destruction of the Armenian Cemetery in Julfa "the most horrific case."

=== Azerbaijan ===
Azerbaijan denies it is in any way propagating anti-Armenian sentiments. President Ilham Aliyev, when confronted with the allegations, started talking about Armenia's crimes during the Nagorno-Karabakh war instead. The delegation of Azerbaijan to the OSCE Review Conference stated that "Armenia should not overlook that the most telling refutation of its mendacious allegations of Azerbaijan in anti-Armenian propaganda and hate dissemination is undoubtedly the fact that, unlike Armenia, which has purged its territory of all Azerbaijanis and other non-Armenians and became a uniquely mono-ethnic State. Azerbaijan has [a] worldwide recognized record of tolerance and peaceful coexistence of various ethnic and religious groups. This tradition is routed in the country's geographic location at the crossroads between East and West, which created opportunities for the Azerbaijani people to benefit from cultural and religious values of different cultures and religions."

=== Europe ===
European Union – On 10 March 2022, the European Parliament adopted a resolution on the destruction of cultural heritage in Nagorno-Karabakh, condemning Azerbaijan's continued policy of erasing and denying the Armenian cultural heritage in and around Nagorno-Karabakh:

"The European Parliament … strongly condemns Azerbaijan’s continued policy of erasing and denying the Armenian cultural heritage in and around Nagorno-Karabakh, in violation of international law and the recent decision of the ICJ...;Acknowledges that the erasure of the Armenian cultural heritage is part of a wider pattern of a systematic, state-level policy of Armenophobia, historical revisionism and hatred towards Armenians promoted by the Azerbaijani authorities, including dehumanisation, the glorification of violence and territorial claims against the Republic of Armenia...;deplores the fact that the conflicts in the Nagorno-Karabakh region have led to the destruction, pillaging and looting of common cultural heritage, which has fuelled further distrust and animosities.

Council of Europe – The European Commission against Racism and Intolerance (ECRI) published five reports on Azerbaijan and noted a general “negative attitude towards Armenians” in each of them. The ECRI wrote:

“Political leaders, educational institutions and media have continued using hate speech against Armenians; an entire generation of Azerbaijanis has now grown up listening to this hateful rhetoric. Human rights activists working inter alia towards reconciliation with Armenia have been sentenced to heavy prison terms on controversial accusations”

== See also ==
- Anti-Armenian sentiment
- Anti-Armenian sentiment in Turkey
- Nagorno-Karabakh conflict
- Armenia–Azerbaijan relations
- Armenians in Azerbaijan
- Armenia–Azerbaijan relations in the Eurovision Song Contest
- Armenian cemetery in Julfa
- Expulsion of Nagorno-Karabakh Armenians
- Killing of Anush Apetyan
- Murder of Gurgen Margaryan
- List of conflicts between Armenia and Azerbaijan
- Western Azerbaijan (expansionist concept)
- Anti-Iranian sentiment in Azerbaijan

== Bibliography ==
- A. Adibekyan, A. Elibegova. "Armenophobia in Azerbaijan" (2018): 261 p.
- Ebrahimi, Shahrooz, and Mostafa Kheiri. "Analysis of Russian Interests in the Caucasus Region (Case Study: Karabakh Crisis)." Central Eurasia Studies 11.2 (2018): 265–282. online
- Erdeniz, Gizem Ayşe. "Nagorno Karabakh Crisis and the BSEC’s Security Problems." (2019). online
- Khodayari, Javad, Morteza Ebrahemi, and Mohammadreza Moolayi. "Social–Political Context Of Nation–State Building in Azerbaijan Republic After the Independence With Emphasis On Nagorno Karabakh Crisis." PhD diss., University of Mohaghegh Ardabili, 2018. online
- Laycock, Jo, "Nagorno-Karabakh’s Myth of Ancient Hatreds." History Today (Oct 2020) online
- Libaridian, Gerard (1988). The Karabagh File: Documents and Facts on the Region of Mountainous Karabagh, 1918–1988 (PDF). New York: Zoryan Institute for Contemporary Armenian Research & Documentation. ISBN 0-916431-26-6. Archived from the original (PDF) on 15 December 2020.
- Özkan, Behlül. "Who Gains from the ‘No War No Peace’ Situation? A Critical Analysis of the Nagorno-Karabakh Conflict." Geopolitics 13#3 (2008): 572–99. https://doi.org/10.1080/14650040802203919
- Paul, Amanda, and Dennis Sammut. "Nagorno-Karabakh and the arc of crises on Europe's borders. EPC Policy Brief, 3 February 2016." (2016). online
- Valigholizadeh, Ali, and Mahdi Karimi. "Geographical explanation of the factors disputed in the Karabakh geopolitical crisis." Journal of Eurasian studies 7.2 (2016): 172–180. online
- Waal, Thomas de (2004). Black garden: Armenia and Azerbaijan through peace and war. New York: New York University Press. p. 42. ISBN 9780814719459.
- The Caucasus: Frozen Conflicts and Closed Borders: Hearing Before The Committee On Foreign Affairs House Of Representatives One Hundred Tenth Congress Second Session (PDF). U.S. Government Printing Office. 2008. Archived from the original (PDF) on 3 February 2010.
