= Falsification of history in Azerbaijan =

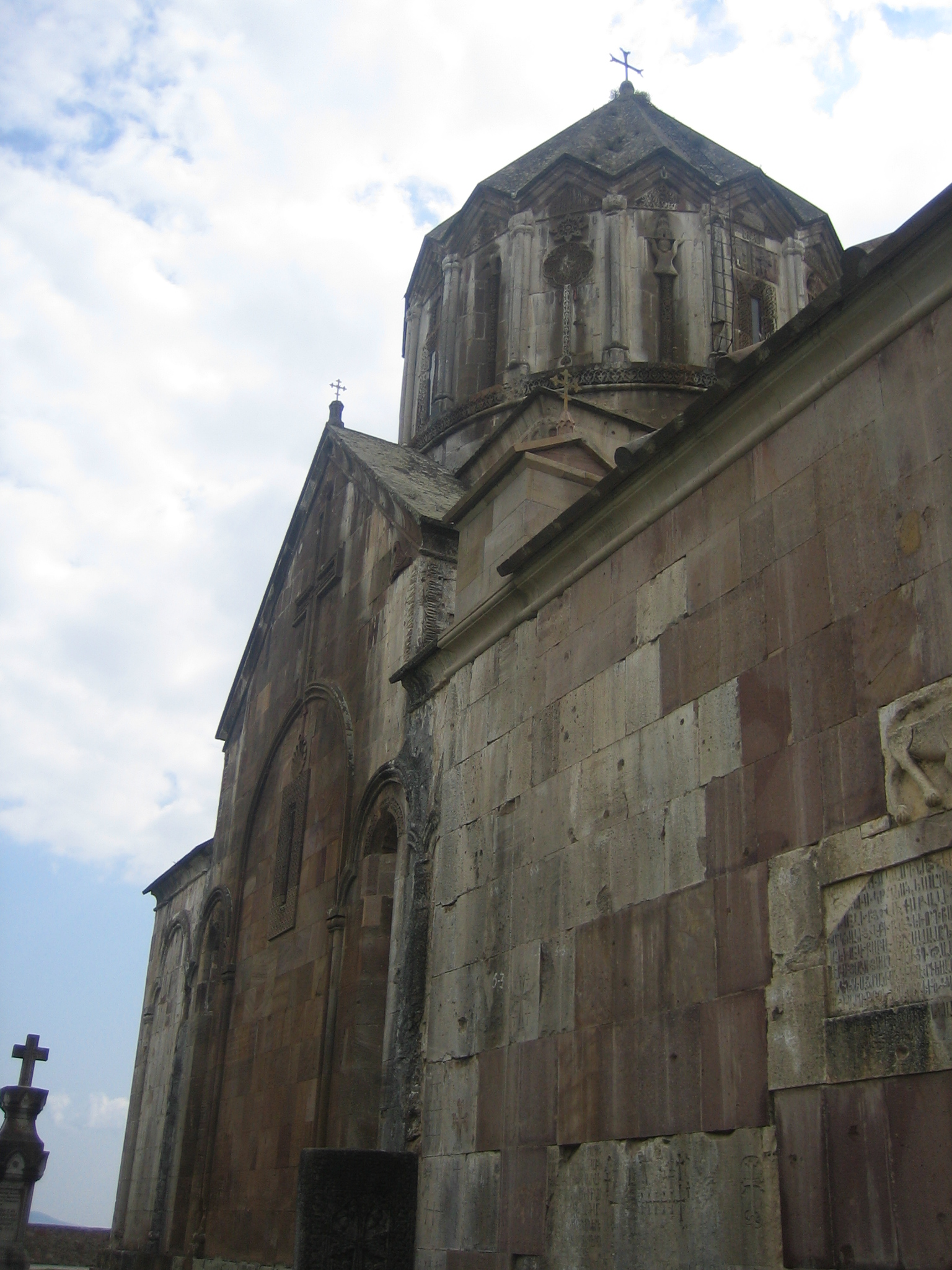
The medieval Armenian Gandzasar monastery in the historically Armenian-populated Nagorno-Karabakh, built by Hasan-Jalal, was the center of the Armenian Apostolic Church's Aghvan (Caucasian Albanian) Catholicosate until the 19th century. Azerbaijani writers say this means its builders were ethnic Caucasian Albanians. (Note: During the Karabakh war, the monastery was deliberately bombed by Azerbaijani long-range artillery and military aircraft. See Lord Hilton's Report on Nagorno-Karabakh Visit)

According to many scholars, the historical research carried out in Azerbaijan with state support has been falsified to exalt the Caucasian Albanians as the alleged ancestors of Azerbaijanis and to provide a historical basis for territorial disputes with Armenians. Much of this false historiography aims to root Azerbaijanis in the territory of Azerbaijan, cleanse it of Armenian heritage, and depict Armenians as newcomers.

== Overview ==
The Azeri revisionist steamroller takes many forms: irreversible destruction, degradation (Armenian cupolas modified, Armenian inscriptions erased, crosses removed), reassignment (churches become mosques), reappropriation through outright denial of its Armenian origins.

— The European Center for Law and Justice,

Multiple observers — including those from government, genocide experts, and others — state that Azerbaijan engages in historical revisionism to support its territorial claims, deprive Armenians of their own territorial claims. and eliminate traces of historical Armenian presence. This has involved the falsification of history, alongside the erasure of Armenian cultural heritage sites, and place-names. as well as the imposition of a state monopoly over Armenian cultural studies, which limits independent research and enforces official narratives. Petrosyan et al. state that Azerbaijan's use of historical falsification aim "to neutralize the Armenian identity of Artsakh."

Genocide scholars Edita Gzoyan et al. write "we are witnessing a systematic, scholarly, political, and military attempt to de-Armenize the land, its names, geography, and history. This process resembles Lemkin’s notion of genocide—the destruction of the national pattern of the targeted group and the imposition of the national pattern of the oppressor." Analysts have observed that Azerbaijan is distinct from other genocidaires insofar as it not only attempts to erase the history of Armenians in the Caucasus but denies their very existence, thereby attempting to minimize the nature of the crime. The European Centre for Law and Justice states "to accomplish complete cultural erasure, Azerbaijan has gone beyond merely destroying Armenian heritage—Azerbaijan is also denying it ever existed," adding that "Azerbaijan seeks to erase...even the memory of the Armenian people."

Alexandra Xanthaki, the UN Special Rapporteur in the field of cultural rights expressed concern over the "ongoing pattern of destruction and appropriation of Armenian historically, culturally, and religiously significant sites and objects....[including]...the organised reinterpretation of the history of Nagorno-Karabakh to erase the traces of the presence of Armenians," adding concern that the "allegations that the combined attacks to people, monuments and symbols, the falsification of the historical narrative and erasure of place names...may amount to cultural cleansing."

== History ==
Under Mir Cəfər Bağırov's leadership as First Secretary of the Azeri SSR, efforts began to erase the historical Armenian presence in Azerbaijan and elevate the Azeri majority to the sole titular nation. Anti-Armenian historical revisionism developed in the 1950-1960s, and promoted the false narrative that Azerbaijanis are descendants of the indigenous Caucasian Albanians. By the 1980s, Azerbaijani media and textbooks pushed more extreme revisionist accounts that included the following: that no Armenians had ever existed in Nagorno-Karabakh nor formed an independent state, that no Caucasian Albanians were Armenianized, that Armenians were newcomers to the region only following Russian intervention.

These revisions, driven by Soviet and later post-Soviet nationalism, contributed to ethnic tensions and paved the way for the ethnic cleansing of Armenians. In certain instances, Azeri historiography explicitly prohibits mentions of Armenians, with the intention of erasing the historical presence of Armenians. Arsène Saparov, Caucasus expert, states that "the persistent Azerbaijani policy of denial of the Armenian presence and cultural heritage in the Caucasus...has been institutionalized since Ilham Aliyev became president."

== The concept of "Albanian Khachdash" ==
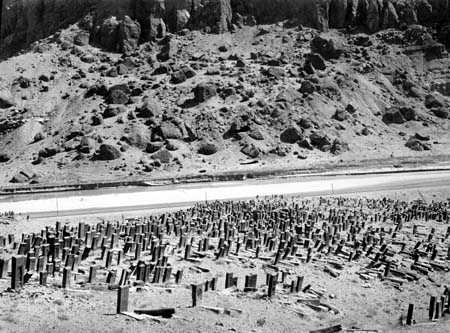
Armenian khachkars of Julfa, declared in Azerbaijan "Caucasian Albanian khachdash", and destroyed in 2003.

One of the most typical and widespread medieval Armenian monuments are khachkars (Note: In November 2010, the art of making khachkars with the wording "Symbolism and craftsmanship of khachkars, Armenian stone crosses" was included in the UNESCO Representative List of the Intangible Cultural Heritage of Humanity (See: UNESCO: Armenian cross-stones art. Symbolism and craftsmanship of Khachkars.) (Armenian: խաչքար, lit. 'cross-stone') - stone steles with a cross and carvings used as tombstones and objects of worship. Khachkars remained in large numbers on all lands where Armenians lived. Therefore, an important manifestation of the "Albanization" of the Armenian cultural heritage was the theory proclaiming the Armenian khachkars of Nagorno-Karabakh, Nakhichevan and (separating them) the Armenian Syunik as Albanian artifacts under the name "khachdashi" (with the replacement of the Armenian – car, "stone", with the Azeri – dash of the same meaning). According to the Azerbaijani architectural historian Davud Aga-oglu Akhundov, khachdashi are distinguished by the fact that they bear in their decor signs of a fusion of Christianity with pre-Christian Albanian beliefs and contain symbols of Mithraism and Zoroastrianism.

In 1985, at the All-Union Archaeological Congress in Baku, Davud Aga-oglu Akhundov made a report in which he expressed these ideas, which provoked a scandal. The Armenian delegation announced its readiness to leave the conference, Leningrad scientists assessed Akhundov's report as a pseudoscientific political action. American archaeologist Philip L. Kohl believes that this report was a deliberate political provocation and aimed at creating a knowingly false cultural myth.

As Russian and Armenian critics later noted, Akhundov simply either did not know or deliberately ignored the well-known features of Christian iconography, declaring these subjects to be Mithraic, and also looked over the Armenian inscriptions on the "khachdash" he studied. According to the Russian specialist A. L. Yakobson, "Mithraist fog envelops almost all the monuments that the authors of <D. A. Akhundov with co-author M. D. Akhundov>, not to mention their generalizations". So, describing the Julfa khachkars of the 16th–17th centuries, Akhundov sees in the images of a lion, a bull and a bird "the eternal companions of God Mithra", while, according to experts, these are undoubted symbols of the Evangelists. The concept of "khachdash" was finally completed in Akhundov's book "Architecture of Ancient and Early Medieval Azerbaijan", reviewed by Academician Ziya Buniyatov, Doctor of Historical Sciences V.G. Aliyev and Doctor of Art History, Professor N.A Sarkisov.

This theory is now officially accepted in Azerbaijani science and propaganda. Thus, the chairman of the Azerbaijan Copyright Agency, Kamran Imanov, denounces the "Armenian tradition of appropriating our cultural values" as follows: These "scientists" at one time stole almost all the wonderful examples of our Christian past – memorials, churches, steles, tombstones, our khachdash, announced "Khachkars". According to the latest theories of Azerbaijani scholars, the custom of erecting stone khachdash crosses was brought to the Caucasus by the Turks back in the "pre-Albanian era".

== Rhetoric ==
Historians which have documented the falsification of Azerbaijani historiography include Victor Schnirelmann, Anatoly Yakobson, Vladimir Zakharov, Mikhail Meltyukhov, Hasan Javadi, Philip L. Kohl and George Bournoutian.

Territorial Claims

Azerbaijani historiography portrays the early to mid 1800s as the "ideal" and "normative" situation with Azeri sovereignty over Nagorno-Karabakh and "Southern Azerbaijan" (Northern Iran), despite that a "united Azerbaijan" was never, in fact, independent but always part of the Iranian empires. In addition, "Western Azerbaijan" is an expansionist propaganda campaign that is used to refer to the territory of Armenia. Azerbaijani officials have falsely claimed that the territory of the modern Armenian republic were lands that once belonged to Azerbaijanis. The concept has received official endorsement by the government of Azerbaijan, and has been used by its current president, Ilham Aliyev, who, since around 2010, has made regular reference to "Irevan" (Yerevan), "Göyçə" (Lake Sevan) and "Zangazur" (Syunik) as once and future "Azerbaijani lands". The irredentist concept of "Western Azerbaijan" is associated with other irredentist claims promoted by Azerbaijani officials and academics, including the "Goyche-Zangezur Republic" and the "Republic of Irevan." In December 2022, Azerbaijan initiated its "Great Return" campaign which ostensibly promotes the settlement of ethnic Azerbaijanis who once lived in Armenia and Nagorno-Karabakh. Azerbaijan's "Great Return" program has been characterized as ahistorical and expansionist by international critics

=== Source falsification ===
According to the point of view prevailing in Azerbaijani historiography, the Armenians appeared in Transcaucasia only after 1828, when these territories were ceded to Russia. Nevertheless, there are a large number of Armenian, Persian, Russian, Arab and other primary sources that record a significant presence of Armenians in the Transcaucasus and, especially, in the territory of Nagorno-Karabakh. According to George Bournoutian, the greatest irritation among Azerbaijani historians was caused by the fact that Muslim primary sources on Transcaucasia living in the territory of present-day Azerbaijan, such as Abbas Quli Bakikhanov, after whom the Institute of History of the Academy of Sciences of Azerbaijan is named, and Mirza Adigozal bey, also clearly note a strong Armenian presence in Karabakh before 1828. To neutralize this fact, Buniyatov and his colleagues, neglecting academic conscientiousness, began to republish medieval primary sources, in which information about the Armenians was deleted. George Burnutyan also gives similar examples of falsification by the Azerbaijani historian Nazim Akhundov in the 1989 reprint (according to Akhundov's statement) of Mirza Jamal Javanshir's book Tarikh-e Qarabagh (History of Karabakh), in places where the manuscript talks about the Armenian possessions of Karabakh the word "Armenian" is systematically omitted.

The distortion of the translation of Bakikhanov's book Gulistan i-Irem by Buniyatov was noted by historians Willem Floor and Hasan Javadi:

"This certainly is the case with Zia Bunyatov, who has made an incomplete and defective Russian translation of Bakikhanov's text. Not only has he not translated any of the poems in the text, but he does not even mention that he has not done so, while he does not translate certain other prose parts of the text without indicating this and why. This is in particular disturbing because he suppresses, for example, the mention of territory inhabited by Armenians, thus not only falsifying history, but also not respecting Bakikhanov's dictum that a historian should write without prejudice, whether religious, ethnic, political or otherwise." — Willem Floor and Hasan Javadi.

Victor Schnirelmann also notes that for Azerbaijani historians headed by Buniyatov, "the way to underestimate the presence of Armenians in the ancient and medieval Transcaucasia and diminish their role is to reissue ancient and medieval sources with cuts, replacing the term "Armenian state" with "Albanian state" or other distortions of the original texts", the fact of reprinting with cuts was also noted by the Russian orientalist Igor M. Diakonoff, the Armenian historian Muradyan and the American professor George Bournoutian.

Historians Mikhail Meltyukhov, Alla Ter-Sarkisiants and Georgy Trapeznikov note that in this publication, when translated from Farsi into Russian and Azerbaijani, "a lot of words and geographical terms ("Azerbaijan","Azerbaijani") appeared in the text, which, as any historian can understand, were absent in the Persian original". In the preface to the book Two chronicles on the history of Karabagh, a professor at the University of California, Barlow Ter-Murdechian, also notes Buniyatov's numerous distortions of the original texts of historians Mirza Jamal and Mirza Adigozal-Bek. According to George Burnutyan, such actions mean that without the publication of a facsimile copy of the original, Azerbaijani editions of sources related to Karabakh are unreliable:

"There are still a number of Persian manuscripts on Karabakh in the archives of Azerbaijan which have yet to be examined critically. Some of this primary material has already appeared in edited Azeri translations and others will undoubtedly follow. Unfortunately, unless they include a certified facsimile of the original manuscript, the tententious scholarship demonstrated above will render all these translations highly suspect and unusable by scholars. // Such blatant tampering with primary source material strikes at the very heart of scholarly integrity. The international academic community must not allow such breaches of intellectual honesty to go unnoticed and uncensured."

— George Bournoutian.

Robert Hewsen in the Historical Atlas of Armenia, in a special note, warns of numerous distortions of the original texts of primary sources published in Soviet and post-Soviet Azerbaijan, the edition of which does not contain any mention of the Armenians present in the original work.

Sh. V. Smbatyan finds numerous distortions of sources in the work of Geyushev Christianity in Caucasian Albania. For example, the book by Hakob Manandian Feudalism in ancient Armenia is cited as Feudalism in ancient Albania by Geyushev, in the title of Suren Yeremian's article Moses Kalankatuisky on the embassy of the Albanian prince Varaz-Trdat to the Khazar Khakan Alp Ilitver the words of the Albanian prince Varaz-Trdat are given to Albania, the facts described with references to The History of the Country of Albania by Movses Kagankatvatsi are absent in this source. Armenian historian Hayk Demoyan, analyzing a photograph of a historical monument from the Historical Geography of Western Azerbaijan, comes to the conclusion that it was falsified from one of the three famous khachkars of the Goshavank monastery, created by the master Pogos in 1291. The Goshavank khachkar is considered one of the best examples of Armenian khachkar art of the 13th century.

Victor Schnirelmann also notes that inscriptions on khachkars are falsified in Azerbaijan. Philip L. Kohl, Mara Kozelski and Nachman Ben-Yehuda point to the falsification of the Mingachevir inscriptions by the Azerbaijani historian Mustafayev, who tried to read them in Azerbaijani (Turkic).

The Armenian historian P. Muradyan, analyzing the translation by Z. Buniyatov of the Armenian Anonymous Chronicle of the 18th century, reveals numerous distortions and "corrections" of the original text. For example, Buniyatov replaced the mentioned Armenian toponyms with Turkic ones, and in a number of places the academician completely deleted the word "Armenia" ("Ottoman troops attacked Armenia" became "the land where Armenians lived"). Muradyan and other historians note another example of falsification of a source by Buniyatov, in particular, the 15th century "Journey" by Johann Schiltberger.

Original text by Hans Schildberger	Falsified text by Hans Schildberger
I also spent a lot of time in Armenia. After the death of Tamerlane, I got to his son, who owned two kingdoms in Armenia . This son, by the name of Shah-Rokh, used to winter on a large plain called Karabagh, which is distinguished by good pastures. It is irrigated by the Kur River, called the Tigris, and the best silk is gathered near the banks of this river. Although this plain lies in Armenia, nevertheless it belongs to the pagans, to whom the Armenian villages are forced to pay tribute. The Armenians have always treated me well, because I was a German, and they are generally very disposed in favor of the Germans (nimits), as they call us. They taught me their language and gave me their Pater Noster.	I spent a lot of time in Armenia. After the death of Tamerlane, I came to his son, who owned two kingdoms. This son, by the name of Shakh-Rokh, used to winter on a large plain called Karabag, which was distinguished by good pastures. It is irrigated by the Kur River, also called the Tigris, and the best silk is gathered near the banks of this river.

Books of medieval sources were republished in Azerbaijan with the replacement of the term "Armenian state" with "Albanian state". Muradyan points to a similar distortion in the 1989 "Brief History of the Country of Aluank" by the Armenian historian Yesai Hasan-Jalalyan.

The original text of Yesai Hasan-Jalalyan	Falsified text of Yesai Hasan-Jalalyan
Gathering up to 10,000 selected and armed men, and with them a host of our priests and servants, with great pomp and triumph, considering the Armenian state (զիշխանութիւն հայոց) re-established, we moved and three days later stopped near the city of Ganja in the Cholak area.	Gathering up to 10,000 selected and armed men, and with them a host of our priests and servants, with great pomp and triumph, considering the Albanian state re-established, we moved and three days later stopped near the city of Ganja in the Cholak area.

=== Distortion of quotations and references ===
Historians A. A. Akopyan, P. M. Muradyan, and Karen Yuzbashyan in their work "On the Study of the History of Caucasian Albania" note that the Azerbaijani historian Farida Mammadova in the book "Political History and Historical Geography of Caucasian Albania" in confirmation of his the concept of the Armenian-Albanian border distorts the quotation of S.V. Yushkov, refers to books that do not contain such information (the authors find a similar reference in the work of Buniyatov). The authors also give an example where Mamedova, referring to Stephen of Syuni, distorts his message about the presence of several dialects, directly called by Stephen of Syuni Armenian dialects, presenting it as a message about the existence of various languages. The authors note that Mamedova criticizes the Armenian author of the late fifth century Pavstos Buzand for his tendentious attempt to prepare the population for the anti-Persian uprising that took place before Pavstos Buzand wrote the work. A. A. Akopyan, P. M. Muradyan, and K. N. Yuzbashyan summarize Mamedova's work as follows:

"voluntarism in the study of antiquity, the falsification of the very concept of historicism, already the result of unhealthy tendencies, cannot be characterized otherwise than as an attempt to deceive one's own people, instill in them unworthy ideas, and tune in to wrong decisions."

Doctor of Philology E. Pivazyan gives an example of falsification of F. Mamedova in her work "Political History and Historical Geography of Caucasian Albania", which on pages 24–25 attributed the translator's notes, which were absent in the original, to the author of the medieval code of law Mkhitar Gosh.

Historians K. A. Melik-Ogadzhanyan and S. T. Melik-Bakhshyan also give examples of distortion of quotations and references to nonexistent statements. A.V. Mushegyan discovers false references to authoritative authors by academician Z. Buniyatov.

Schnirelmann gives another example of distortion of links in the works of Mamedova and Buniyatov:

"Later, some Azerbaijani scholars began to completely reject the participation of Mesrop Mashtots in the creation of the Albanian writing system and tried to find an ally in this in the person of A.G. Perikhanyan (Mamedova, 1986, p. 7; Buniyatov, 1987c. P. 118). Meanwhile, in the work of Perikhanyan, only a hypothesis was expressed that Mesrop Mashtots attracted the Albanian Benjamin as his assistant, passing him the experience of creating writing. Perikhanyan clearly demonstrated that the Albanian alphabet was created under the unconditional influence of the Armenian one. Consequently, she did not in the least question the fact of Mesrop Mashtots' participation in his invention." (Perikhanyan, 1966, pp. 127–133).

Leningrad historian D.I. n. A. Yakobson, criticizing the attempts of Azerbaijani historians to record the Gandzasar Monastery as a monument of Albanian (according to Yakobson, thus also Azerbaijani) architecture, also finds examples of distortion of quotations from the Azerbaijani historian Geyushev. Analyzing the report of D. A. and M. D. Akhundovs "Cult symbols and the picture of the world captured on the temples and steles of Caucasian Albania", Jacobson comes to the conclusion that the definitions given by the authors are "fake", and the report itself "distorts the artistic content and origin of the Armenian medieval decorative arts".

== State support for history falsification ==
V. A. Schnirelmann notes that there is a direct state order for publications with distortions of the source texts in Azerbaijan, designed to "clear" the history of Armenians:

"Another way to underestimate the presence of Armenians in ancient and medieval Transcaucasia and diminish their role is to republish ancient and medieval sources with cuts, replacing the term "Armenian state" with "Albanian state" or with other distortions of the original texts. In the 1960-1990s. Many such reprints of primary sources were published in Baku, which was actively pursued by Academician Z. M. Buniyatov. In the most recent years, describing ethnic processes and their role in the history of Azerbaijan, Azerbaijani authors sometimes generally avoid discussing the issue of the appearance of the Azerbaijani language and Azerbaijanis there, thereby making the reader understand that they have existed there from time immemorial. It is unlikely that Azerbaijani historians did all this exclusively of their own free will; they were dominated by the order of the party and government structures of Azerbaijan."

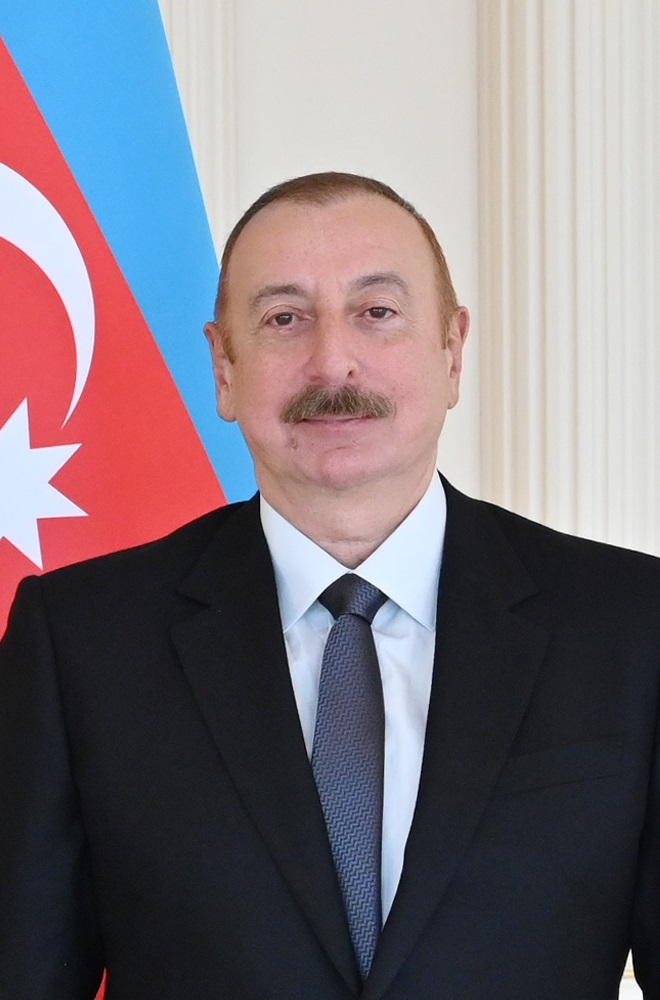
Ilham Aliyev: "... present-day Armenia, the territory called the Republic of Armenia on the map, is primordially Azerbaijani land. It is truth. Of course, Zangezur, the Iravan Khanate are our lands! ... Our children should know all this, they should know that today's Armenia is located on the ancestral Azerbaijani lands"

According to George Bournoutian, propaganda "historical" books are published in Azerbaijan by order of the government, in which Azerbaijani historians try to prove that Armenians appeared in the Caucasus after 1828.

At the ceremonial meeting dedicated to the anniversary of the Nakhichevan Autonomous Republic (1999), the then President of Azerbaijan Heydar Aliyev directly called on historians to "create substantiated documents" and "prove that Azerbaijan belongs to the lands where Armenia is now located". Thus, according to Schnirelmann, the Azerbaijani authorities gave direct instructions to historians to rewrite the history of Transcaucasia. Farida Mammadova admits that Heydar Aliyev personally demanded from her scientific criticism of every book about the history of Albania published in Armenia. Historian Arsène Saparov states that the case of Stalinist deportations of Azerbaijanis from Armenia became part of a state-sponsored "anti-Armenian conspiracy theory," adding that "any critical assessment of this case by Azerbaijani historians is impossible."

The existence of the state program of falsification of the history of the Transcaucasus in Azerbaijan is also noted by the historians Mikhail Meltyukhov, Alla Ter-Sarkisiants and Georgi Trapeznikov.

Historian Vladimir Zakharov, deputy director of the MGIMO Center for Caucasian Studies, commenting on the words of Ilham Aliyev that Armenia was created on the primordial Azerbaijani lands, notes that "historical research in Azerbaijan is at the service not of science, but of the political ambitions of the leaders," and Azerbaijani historians are engaged in deceiving their own people.

On 14 December 2005, Ilham Aliyev, the President of Azerbaijan, in a speech on the occasion of the 60th anniversary of the Academy of Sciences of Azerbaijan, called on Azerbaijani scientists to get involved in the program of justifying the lack of historical rights of the Karabakh Armenians to Nagorno-Karabakh before the world community. President Aliyev promised to subsidize the program of uniting the efforts of Azerbaijani specialists in the development and propaganda of his thesis that "the Armenians came to Nagorno-Karabakh, an integral part of Azerbaijan, as guests," arguing that "in the 70s of the last century, a monument was erected there, reflecting their settlement, the 150th anniversary of the settlement of Armenians (Note: Schnirelmann believes that the problem of resettlement of Armenians in Transcaucasia occupies one of the key places in the modern anti-Armenian propaganda in Azerbaijan, which claims that in this way the Russian authorities tried to create a Christian outpost against Muslims. Also, Azerbaijani historians claim that the Armenians appeared in Karabakh after 1828 and that the Armenian graves in Karabakh are not older than 150 years old (as of 1989). According to Schnirelmann, these views of Azerbaijani historians are based on a note allegedly drawn up by Griboyedov (according to Schnirelmann, Griboyedov had nothing to do with it), and from the works of Russian chauvinists of the early 20th century, such as Shavrov and Velichko, and ignore documents from the 18th-early 19th centuries. (See Victor Schnirelmann. Войны памяти: мифы, идентичность и политика в Закавказье (in Russian). pp. 236–237.) However, historical sources show that the Armenians were the majority of the population of Nagorno-Karabakh until 1829–1830. For example, the American historian George Burnutyan, analyzing the results of the census of the population of the Karabakh Khanate, conducted by the Russian authorities in the first half of 1823, indicates that the Armenian population of the Khanate was mainly concentrated in 8 out of 21 magals (districts), of which five (Gulistan, Jraberd, Khachen, Varanda, Dizak) – that is, Armenian melikoms with an overwhelming predominance of the Armenian population – make up the modern territory of Nagorno-Karabakh, and three more were located in Zangezur. In 1836, official data on the population of the Caucasus were published in St. Petersburg. According to these data, approx. 19 thousand Armenians and approx. 35 thousand Tatars (Azerbaijanis), that is, Armenians accounted for 35.2% of the population of Karabakh. At the same time, it was clearly indicated that the Armenian population is concentrated mainly in the mountainous regions of Karabakh (usually referred to as Nagorno-Karabakh). Thus, 35.2% of the population of Karabakh (Armenians) lived on 38% of its territory, where they constituted the absolute majority (See George A. Bournoutian (1999). The Politics of Demography: Misuse of Sources on the Armenian Population of Mountainous Karabakh. Vol. 9. New York: The Journal of the Society for Armenian Studies. pp. 99–103.)) in Karabakh was celebrated" and therefore "the Armenians have absolutely no right to assert that Nagorno-Karabakh in the past belonged to them". On 26 April 2011, at the annual general meeting of the National Academy of Sciences of Azerbaijan, Ilham Aliyev repeated these theses and stated:

"Our scientists, responding positively to my call, in a short time have created excellent and based on real facts work related to the history of this region"

The Azerbaijani state also has constructed a false historical narrative portraying Azerbaijanis as victims of genocide or ethnic cleansing, including through official commemorations such as the "Day of Genocide of Azerbaijanis," despite the events cited not meeting the legal or historical criteria for genocide. Scholars characterize this narrative as a deliberate inversion of history, designed to counter and obscure the Armenian Genocide while simultaneously legitimizing territorial claims and the erasure or appropriation of Armenian cultural heritage.

De Baets from Wesleyan University notes that historians are persecuted in Azerbaijan for "incorrect" interpretation of historical concepts. Thus, in December 1994, the historian Movsum Aliyev was arrested for publishing the article "Answer to the falsifiers of history."

=== Formation of the image of the "enemy" in Azerbaijan and Armenia ===
The Nagorno-Karabakh Conflict, has exacerbated tensions between Armenians and Azerbaijanis. In Azerbaijan, this led to the formation of an image of a victim, combined with revanchist aspirations. On the other hand, in Armenia, where genocide has become the main factor shaping identity, Azerbaijanis are promoted as de facto Turks. Sergei Rumyantsev, candidate of sociological sciences, director of the Novator Center for Social Research cites the construction of the image of a "historical enemy" on the basis of a literary work of the Turkic world of the 11th–12th centuries. "Kitabi Dede Gorgud", which is not only presented as a "historical chronicle of our fatherland", that is, Azerbaijan, aged thirteen centuries, but also the replacement of the Kipchak tribes (which served in the Turkic epic as an authentic image of the "infidels" with whom the Oguzes fought) by the Armenians and Georgians. As the author notes, "basically all the appeals to the text of the epic in the textbooks were intended to serve as the basis for the constructed image of the "historical enemy." The events of recent years ... have led to the fact that this "honorable" place was taken first of all by the Armenians". Sergei Rumyantsev illustrates this with the example of a school textbook published in 2003 on Azerbaijani history. According to independent experts in Armenia and Azerbaijan, this policy makes the differences more and more insurmountable every year. A generation of young people has grown up, for whom "Armenian" and "Azeri" have become an ideological cliché, an image of an "enemy".

== See also ==
- Pseudohistory
- Anti-Armenian sentiment

== Literature ==
- Broers, Laurence (2019). Armenia and Azerbaijan: Anatomy of a Rivalry. Edinburgh University Press. ISBN 978-1474450522.
- Victor Schnirelmann (2003). "Caucasian Albanian myth". Memory Wars: Myths, Identity and Politics in Transcaucasia. Reviewer: L. B. Alaev. Moscow: Academbook.
- Victor Schnirelmann (2013). Well, why attribute the prevailing views in Azerbaijan to "world science"?. Moscow.
- Zakharov V. (2010). Historical Illiteracy, or Aggressive Aspirations. Moscow.
- Yakobson A. (1984). "Gandzasar monastery and khachkars: facts and fictions". HPHJ (in Russian) (2): 146–152.
- Sergey Rumyantsev (2010). "First studies and first specialists: the situation in the field of social sciences and humanities in post-Soviet Azerbaijan". Laboratorium (in Russian) (1): 284–310. Archived from the original on 16 April 2012.
- Akopyan A.A.; Muradyan P.M.; Yuzbashyan K.N. (1987). To the study of the history of Caucasian Albania (Concerning the book by F. Mamedova "Political history and historical geography of Caucasian Albania (III century BC – VIII century AD)" (Ist.-philol. journal ed.). pp. 166–189.
- George A. Bournoutian (1992). "Rewriting History: Recent Azeri Alterations of Primary Sources Dealing with Karabakh". Journal of the Society for Armenian Studies. 6: 185–190. Archived from the original on 10 November 2001.
- M. Meltyukhov; A. Ter-Sarkisyants; G. Trepeznikov (1999). Historical falsifications with political overtones. Moscow.
- To coverage of the problems of history and culture of Caucasian Albania and the eastern provinces of Armenia. Compiled by P. M. Muradyan. Yerevan: Yerevan State Publishing House university. 1991.
- Galichyan Ruben (2010) [Հորինված պատմություն: Ադրբեջան և Հայաստան. Կեղծիքներ և փաստեր]. Mythologization of history. Azerbaijan, Armenia, fictions and facts (PDF). Yerevan: Komitas Institute and Printinfo Publishing House. ISBN 978-9939-9005-7-5. Archived from the original (PDF) on 2 April 2015.
- L. Melik-Shahnazaryan. Scam academy
- A. Shakhnazaryan. From the Sumerians to Turan – in search of the history of Azerbaijan
- Crombach, S. G. (2019). Ziia Buniiatov and the invention of an Azerbaijani past
- Notes from Lord Hylton, MA ARICS, resulting from a visit to Nagorno Karabakh and Armenia 13–21 April 1998
