= Killing of Anush Apetyan =

2022 torture, rape, and killing of an Armenian soldier

Anush Apetyan (Armenian: Անուշ Ապետյան; 1986 – 13 or 14 September 2022) was an Armenian soldier who was tortured, mutilated, raped, and killed by Azerbaijani forces during the September 2022 Armenia–Azerbaijan clashes in the city of Jermuk. Apetyan had three children, aged 16, 15 and 4. In 2022, Azerbaijani soldier Gardashkhan Abishov — investigated for abusing Armenian soldiers and sharing a video of the Apetyan's mutilation — was awarded by President Aliyev for "protecting Azerbaijan's borders."

== Killing ==
During the invasion by Azerbaijan of the Armenian lands between September 13 and 14, an Armenian soldier named Anush Apetyan was captured alive by Azerbaijani forces alongside more than 10 Armenian soldiers captured alive, upon the Armenian Ministry of Defense.

After that, the video of torture and mutilation of a woman captured by Azerbaijani soldiers was first released on Telegram and after a while it was found that the woman is the Armenian soldier Anush Apetyan. In that video it was obvious that she had been tortured and mutilated, her legs were cut off, at least one finger was cut off and placed in her mouth, and one eye was poked out and replaced with a stone, and it was while the Azerbaijani soldiers surrounding her were celebrating and mocking her.

== Reactions ==
On 20 September 2022 Dicle Amed Women's Platform (DAKP) spokesperson Kıymet Yıldır recalled and condemned the killing of Anush Apetyan by Azerbaijani forces, during the gathering of women in some cities of Turkey like Van, Diyarbakır and Istanbul which held to condemning both the killing of Jina Amini by the Iranian police and also Anush Apetyan.

Armenian Women's Union issued a statement read by co-chairs Anahîd Qasabyan and Arbî Kespiryan, at the Leader Öcalan Park in Hasakah, AANES, condemned the killing of Armenian female soldier Anush Apetyan by Azerbaijani forces and of Jina Amini by the Iranian regime, and call on all women to unite against tyranny.

Senator Bob Menendez, Chairman of the United States Senate Committee on Foreign Relations, called for an end to financial and military aid to Azerbaijan after the discovery of this video, considering that the foreign policy of the United States cannot assist terrorist states that commit war crimes.

For the Lemkin Institute for the Prevention of Genocide, this war crime is part of a “genocidal policy” on the part of Azerbaijan towards the Armenian population.

== See also ==
- Kyaram Sloyan
- Murder of Gurgen Margaryan
