= Kyaram Sloyan =

Artsakh Defense Army soldier

- Born: 27 April 1996; Artashavan, Aragatsotn Province, Armenia
- Died: 1/2 April 2016 (aged 19); Martakert, Artsakh
- Burial place: Artashavan
- Military career
- Allegiance: Artsakh
- Branch: Artsakh Defense Army
- Service years: 2014–2016
- Rank: Soldier
- Unit: Artsakh Defense Army
- Conflicts: Four-Day War
- Awards: Order of the Combat Cross (1st degree); "For Service in Battle" medal

Kyaram or Qyaram Sloyan (Armenian: Քյարամ Սլոյան; 27 April 1996 – 1/2 April 2016) was an Artsakh Defense Army soldier who was killed during the 2016 Armenian–Azerbaijani clashes. After his death, he was beheaded, with videos and pictures showing Azerbaijani soldiers posing with his severed head posted on social networks.

On May 28, 2016, he was posthumously awarded the Order of the Combat Cross (1st degree) by the President of Armenia.

== Biography ==
Kyaram Sloyan was born in Artashavan, a village in the Aragatsotn Province of Armenia on 27 April 1996 to a family of Yazidi-Kurds. His father, Kyalash, is a veteran of the First Nagorno-Karabakh War. Sloyan was drafted to the Artsakh Defense Army along with 100 other Armenian Yazidis at the age of 18.

Sloyan, then serving the last quarter of his military service, was one of the first to be killed during the armed clashes. He would have been demobilised in about two months.

== Death and beheading ==
Azerbaijani military started attacking Armenian military positions on 1 and 2 April, which resulted in casualties on both sides. Sloyan was one of the casualties. His body was afterwards mutilated and beheaded. Images of Azerbaijani soldiers holding his severed head were posted on the social-networking site VKontakte. Soon after this, videos of Azerbaijanis holding his head appeared on various websites. In one, a soldier is giving a Grey Wolves salute. The Sunday Times called them "shocking souvenir photos of uniformed Azerbaijani soldiers posing with the severed head". The public report of the Human Rights' defender (ombudsman) of NKR said that the beheading of Kyaram Sloyan by the Azerbaijani troops constituted a "grave breach of customary international law".

After news reports appeared about the images being circulated, Azerbaijani sources responded that the images were false, that the soldiers depicted did not look like ethnic Azerbaijanis, and that the photos were probably taken during fighting in Syria. On 3 May the Azerbaijani Defense Ministry said that the images were not real and said that all the bodies of Armenian soldiers had been handed over in the presence of international observers, and no traces of violence were detected on the bodies.

== Burial ==
RFE/RL Armenia reported that Sloyan's body was buried without its head on April 5, 2016, in his native village of Artashavan. On April 8, through the mediation of the Red Cross, the Azerbaijani side returned his head. Sloyan was interred for a second time the following day, to lay his head with his body.

== Aftermath ==
A class at the school of Artashavan village is named after Sloyan. On 30 May 2016 his bust was opened in the same school. He was posthumously awarded the "For Service in Battle" medal and Order of the Combat Cross (1st degree).

In April 2016 Armenia's Permanent Representative to the OSCE, Ambassador Arman Kirakosyan made a statement regarding Azerbaijan's violations of international humanitarian law at the session of OSCE Permanent Council. He pointed out that 3 servicemen including Kyaram Sloyan were decapitated by Azerbaijani soldiers in a manner characteristic of ISIS.

According to Regnum News Agency, during his visit to the Terter, Agdam and Barda districts, President of Azerbaijan Ilham Aliyev awarded an Azerbaijani soldier who appeared to be one of the soldiers photographed posing with the severed head of Sloyan.

Armenian Deputy Foreign Minister Shavarsh Kocharyan condemned the encouragement of the Azerbaijani serviceman who was depicted on another photo where the mutilated head of Sloyan was manifestly shown. According to Kocharyan, “the encouragement of such a crime at the highest state level isn’t something new for Azerbaijan: Ramil Safarov, who was sentenced to life imprisonment for having axed a sleeping Armenian (Lieutenant Gurgen Margaryan) to death in Budapest, was immediately pardoned, awarded and proclaimed hero by the Azerbaijani President upon his extradition to Baku in 2012.”

Representatives of the Parliamentary Assembly of the Council of Europe (PACE) have stated their intentions to report the beheading to the Council of Europe Commissioner for Human Rights. The co-rapporteurs said: "We are going to submit a report to the Council of Europe Commissioner for Human Rights on the fact of murdering and beheading of a conscript, and then publicizing it."

In April 2016, the European Court of Human Rights (ECHR) registered complaints applied by the families of 3 beheaded Armenian soldiers, including Kyaram Sloyan. They applied to the ECHR to recognize violations against them through inhuman treatment, disrespect of the private lives of the victims, as well as national discrimination. According to the leader of "Sinjar" Yezidi Union Boris Muraz, publications, photographs, as well as "a shocking video, which shows how one of the Azerbaijani villages gathered to demonstrate the severed head of Sloyan" are attached to the lawsuit.

In his speech, the Member of the National Assembly of Armenia Delegation to PACE Samvel Farmanyan stated that numerous photos in social networks are a "real evidence of cruel treatment of Azerbaijani soldiers posing with the head of Kyaram Sloyan as a trophy". According to Farmanyan, "later the head was transferred to local Azerbaijani population demonstrating it as a trophy encouraging hatred and aggression towards Armenians. No action by official Baku has followed to punish the guilty. By doing so Azerbaijan once more violated numerous international treaties".

According to Aravot Daily, one of the soldiers posing with Sloyan's head, the person giving the Grey Wolves salute, was named Abdulmejid Akhundov, an Azerbaijani army conscript, and that he was later killed as the clashes continued, and his body was one of those returned by Armenia to Azerbaijan in the exchange organized by the International Committee of the Red Cross.

== Awards ==
Country	Award	Date
Armenia	Order of the Combat Cross of the First Degree	
Artsakh	"For Service in Battle" medal	

== See also ==
- Death of Anush Apetyan
- Murder of Gurgen Margaryan
- Yazidis
