= Jeremy Smith (historian) =

Jeremy Smith (born 1964) is a historian whose research has focused on the non-Russian nationalities of the Soviet Union. Smith's work has challenged some of the Cold War views of Richard Pipes.

== Works ==
- Smith, J. (1999). The Bolsheviks and the National Question, 1917–23. Springer. ISBN 978-0-230-37737-0.
- Smith, Jeremy (2013). Red Nations: The Nationalities Experience in and after the USSR. Cambridge University Press. ISBN 978-1-107-29211-6.
