= Murder of Gurgen Margaryan =

2004 murder of an Armenian soldier

Gurgen Margaryan
- Born: 26 September 1978; Yerevan, Armenian SSR, Soviet Union
- Died: 19 February 2004 (aged 25); Budapest, Hungary
- Military career
- Allegiance: Armenia
- Branch: Armenian Army
- Service years: 1999—2004
- Rank: Lieutenant
- Awards: Medal for Courage of Armenia (awarded posthumously, 2005)

On 19 February 2004, Gurgen Margaryan (Armenian: Գուրգեն Մարգարյան; 26 September 1978 – 19 February 2004), a lieutenant in the Armenian army, was murdered in Budapest, Hungary, by Ramil Safarov, a lieutenant in the Azerbaijani army.

In September 2013, a monument dedicated to Margaryan was unveiled in Yerevan.

== Education ==
Margaryan was born in Yerevan, the capital of Armenia. He received his secondary education at School No. 122 in Yerevan and subsequently graduated from the State Engineering University of Armenia with a bachelor's degree in engineering. After completing his mandatory military service term from 1999 to 2001, he became an officer in the Ministry of Defense of Armenia with the rank of lieutenant.

== Murder ==
On 11 January 2004, he left for Budapest, Hungary, to participate in a three-month English language course which was part of NATO's Partnership for Peace program. On 19 February he was murdered with an axe, while asleep, by his fellow participant, Azerbaijani Lieutenant Ramil Safarov. The murder took place at 5 am, while the victim was asleep. Margaryan's Hungarian roommate, Balázs Kuti, remembers that on the evening of February 18 he had tea and went to bed, as he had a fever, while Margaryan busied himself with his studies. Around 9:30 pm, Margaryan went to visit another program participant from Armenia, Hayk Makuchyan, who was staying in another room.

Kuti does not remember when Margaryan returned, but early in the morning he felt that someone had turned on the light. He thought it was Gurgen returning to the room, but after hearing some muffled sounds, he turned his head away from the wall and saw Safarov standing by Margaryan's bed with a long axe in his hands:

By that time, I understood that something terrible had happened for there was blood all around. I started to shout at the Azerbaijani, urging him to stop it. He said that he had no problems with me and would not touch me, stabbed Gurgen a couple of more times, and left. The expression of his face was as if he was glad he had finished something important.

A postmortem concluded that Safarov had delivered sixteen blows to Margaryan's face, nearly severing his head from his body. Earlier, a briefing given by the Hungarian police added that Margaryan had also been stabbed several times in the chest. After he killed Margaryan, Safarov went forward with his plan to murder Makuchyan, but discovered his door was locked. In the meantime, Kuti had run out of his room and summoned the police, who promptly arrived at the scene and arrested Safarov. During interrogation he confessed to killing Margaryan. A Budapest policeman commented that the murder had been conducted "with unusual cruelty," adding "beside a number of knife wounds on his chest, the victim's head was practically severed from his body."

== Trial and verdict ==
During the trial, Safarov's lawyers attempted to convince the judge that he had an unstable mind, and claimed that he suffered from post-traumatic stress disorder. They argued that he had gone through psychological trauma during the First Nagorno-Karabakh War. However, this contradicted a statement Safarov had made when he said he had been studying in Azerbaijan's capital of Baku and in Turkey from 1992 to 1996. A mental health examination conducted by an Azerbaijani doctor concluded that he was not "entirely sane." Another examination found that Safarov was of stable mind at the time of the murder, and the judge chose to believe this assessment. An Azerbaijani physician alleged, based on his supposed personal conversations with Safarov, that his motives stemmed from his belief that Margaryan had insulted (in some versions, that he had urinated on) the Azerbaijani flag in front of other participants in the NATO seminar. However, in both his interrogation and his court trial Safarov said he murdered Margaryan just because he was an Armenian. No witnesses were ever called by the defense during the trial to corroborate these allegations in court and prosecution lawyers strongly disputed that they had taken place.

On 16 April 2006, the court sentenced Safarov to life imprisonment without possibility of appeal until 2036. The judge, Andras Vaskuti, cited the premeditated nature and brutality of the crime and the fact that Safarov showed no remorse for his deeds as the reasons for the sentence. On 22 February 2007, a Hungarian court upheld the ruling following an appeal filed by Safarov's lawyer.

In late August 2012, however, Hungarian authorities agreed to release and extradite Safarov to Azerbaijan to serve the remainder of his sentence there. Though the Hungarian government stated that it had received assurances from the Azerbaijan government that the sentence would be enforced, President Ilham Aliyev issued a pardon immediately upon Safarov's arrival to Baku and ordered that he be "freed from the term of his punishment." Safarov has since been promoted to the rank of major and provided with accommodations by the Azerbaijan government. The Government of Azerbaijan reportedly offered to buy 2-4 billion dollars of Hungarian sovereign bonds in order to secure the release of the convicted murderer.

== Reactions ==
=== Armenia ===
In 2004, after the murder, Armenia's Ministry of Foreign Affairs expressed outrage and vehemently condemned the crime, stating that it "...expects that international organizations will assess this crime appropriately and react. At the same time, we demand that the Hungarian authorities punish the perpetrator to the maximum extent of the law. The Armenian Foreign Ministry expresses its condolences to the family, relatives and colleagues of Lieutenant Gurgen Margarian." On 31 August 2012, upon Safarov's transfer to Azerbaijan and his pardoning there, Armenian President Serzh Sargsyan announced that Armenia was suspending diplomatic relations and all official contacts with Hungary.

=== Azerbaijan ===
Zardusht Alizade, an Azerbaijani political scientist, said that Safarov would have been a national hero, if not recognized as someone who had committed a crime, for which he must be punished. Elmira Süleymanova, the human rights commissioner (ombudsman) of Azerbaijan, declared that Safarov's punishment was far too harsh and that "Safarov must become an example of patriotism for the Azerbaijani youth." Fuad Agayev, a prominent Azerbaijani lawyer, said that Azerbaijanis "...have to urgently stop this current campaign to raise Safarov to the rank of national hero. He is no hero.”

=== European Court of Human Rights ===
A court case, Makuchyan and Minasyan v. Azerbaijan and Hungary, was brought in front of the European Court of Human Rights and decided upon in 2020, the final judgement placing blame on Azerbaijan for its decisions in the treatment of Safarov (mala fide acts), but largely acquitting Hungary for its part in transferring the convicted murderer to his home country (due diligence).

== Burial ==
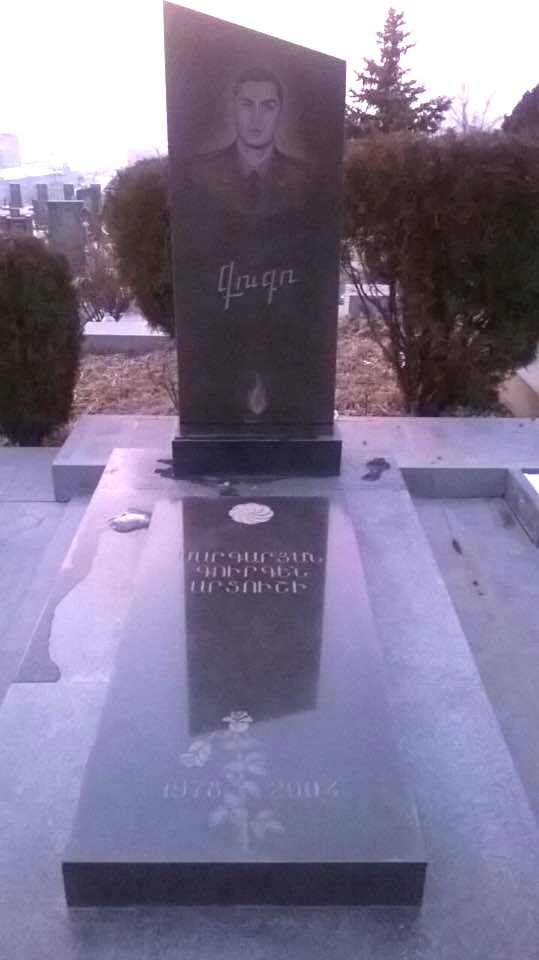
Margaryan's grave at Yerablur

Margaryan's body was flown back to Armenia and was buried at Yerablur military cemetery.

== Father's suicide attempt ==
In September 2013, Artush Margaryan, Gurgen Margaryan's father, was hospitalized. According to Armenian news sources, Margaryan had attempted to commit suicide by repeatedly stabbing himself in the stomach. He underwent surgery at Malatia Medical Center in Yerevan and, due to previous complications, his condition was originally listed as critical. Over the next few days, his condition was upgraded to stable. The sources have yet to give a reason for the suicide attempt.

== See also ==
- Death of Anush Apetyan
- Kyaram Sloyan
