= Philip L. Kohl =

American anthropologist (1946–2022)

Philip L. Kohl (September 20, 1946 – May 11, 2022) was an American anthropologist. He was a professor at Wellesley College.

== Biography ==
Kohl grew up in Chicago in 1946. His parents were Commonwealth Edison employees and the family lived in South Shore, Chicago. He graduated from St. Ignatius College Prep in 1964 and enrolled at the College of the Holy Cross for one year before dropping out.

Returning home to Chicago, Kohl worked at Marshall Field's while attending the University of Chicago at night. Kohl received his B.A. in Greek and Latin from Columbia University in 1969 and his Ph.D. in anthropology from Harvard University in 1974. He also worked part time at the Goddard Institute for Space Studies as an undergraduate at Columbia. His doctoral thesis focused on commodity trade in Southwest Asia during the Bronze Age.

From 1974 to 2016, Kohl taught at Wellesley College. He is the author of many books, 140 articles and reviews on the archaeology of the Ancient Near East and has conducted fieldwork in Iran, Afghanistan, Central Asia, Armenia, Azerbaijan, Georgia, and Russia. He was a member of the editorial board of the scholarly journal Antiguo Oriente.

== Selected bibliography ==
- The Bronze Age Civilization of Central Asia: Recent Soviet Discoveries. Armonk, N.Y: M.E. Sharpe. 1981. ISBN 0-87332-169-3.
- Nationalism, Politics, and the Practice of Archaeology. with Clare Fawcett. Cambridge: Cambridge University Press. 1995. ISBN 0-521-48065-5.
- Selective Remembrances: Archaeology in the Construction, Commemoration, and Consecration of National Pasts. with Mara Kozelsky, and Nachman Ben-Yehuda. Chicago: University of Chicago Press. 2007. ISBN 978-0-226-45058-2.
