= Anatoly Yakobson (archaeologist) =

Soviet archeologist (1906–1984)

- Анатолий Леопольдович Якобсон
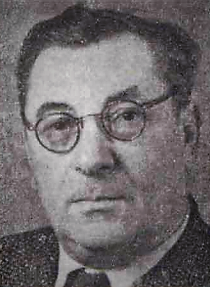
- Born: August 22, 1906; Luga, Saint Petersburg Governorate, Russian Empire
- Died: August 3, 1984 (aged 77); Leningrad, Soviet Union
- Citizenship: Russian Empire; Soviet Union
- Education: Saint Petersburg State University
- Scientific career
- Academic advisors: Nikolai Marr
- Notable students: Alexander Aibabin

Anatoly Leopoldovich Yakobson (Russian: Анатолий Леопольдович Якобсон; 22 August 1906 – August 3, 1984) was a Soviet archaeologist, historian of art and architecture.

He was a Doctor of Historical Sciences (1961) and member of the Institute of Archeology of the USSR Academy of Sciences.

== Early life and education ==
Anatoly Yakobson was born in the family of a forester. In 1922 he entered the Faculty of Physics and Mathematics of Moscow University, two years later he transferred to the archaeological department of the Faculty of Ethnology. In 1927, Yakobson moved to live in Leningrad, where he studied at the Faculty of Linguistics and the History of Material Culture of Leningrad University. In 1929, he graduated from Leningrad University.

In 1941, he defended his Ph.D. thesis on the topic "Architecture of medieval Chersonese".

== Career ==
Since 1930, he worked in Leningrad, at the State Academy of the History of Material Culture, which in 1937 became part of the USSR Academy of Sciences as the Institute of the History of Material Culture named after Nikolai Marr. In 1943, the institute was transferred to Moscow, and its branch remained in Leningrad.

Anatoly Yakobson endured the Siege of Leningrad. After being evacuated to Ivanovo, he moved to Moscow and was hired by the Moscow branch of the Institute of the History of Material Culture.

In 1945, he transferred to the Leningrad branch of the same institute, where he worked until the end of his life.

His research interests are: Eastern Europe in the Middle Ages, the Northern Black Sea region and Transcaucasia. He carried out large-scale excavations in the Crimea (Tauric Chersonesus, etc.).

He is the author of more than 60 scientific works, including "Essays on the history of Armenian architecture in the 5th-17th centuries" (1950).

== Scientific activity ==
Anatoly Yakobson took part in archaeological expeditions in Old Crimea, Sudak, Chersonese.

In 1936, he participated in the excavations of Amberd Castle in Armenia.

In the 1930s, he took part in the work of the Tsimlyansk expedition.

Yakobson participated in an expedition to the Mangup settlement led by E.V. Weimarn, M.A. Tikhanova and A.L. Jacobson.

== Main works ==
- Yakobson, A. L. (1950). Очерк истории зодчества Армении V—XVII веков [Essay on the history of Armenian architecture of the 5th-17th centuries] (in Russian). State Publishing House of Architecture and Urban Planning. p. 168.
- Yakobson, A. L. (1950). Средневековый Херсонес (XII—XIV вв.) [Medieval Chersonese (XII—XIV centuries)] (in Russian). Nauka. p. 338.
- Yakobson, A. L. (1959). Раннесредневековый Херсонес: Очерки истории материальной культуры [Early Medieval Chersonese: Essays on the History of Material Culture] (in Russian). Nauka. p. 364.
- Yakobson, A. L. (1964). Средневековый Крым: Очерки истории и истории материальной культуры [Medieval Crimea: Essays on the history and history of material culture] (in Russian). Nauka. p. 232.
- Yakobson, A. L. (1971). Древности Московского Кремля. Материалы и исследования по археологии СССР. Материалы и исследования по археологии Москвы, т. IV, No. 167 [Antiquities of the Moscow Kremlin. Materials and research on the archeology of the USSR. Materials and research on the archeology of Moscow, vol. IV, No. 167] (in Russian). pp. 230–247.
- Yakobson, A. L. (1973). Крым в средние века [Crimea in the Middle Ages] (in Russian). Nauka. p. 174.
- Yakobson, A. L. (1979). Керамика и керамическое производство средневековой Таврики [Ceramics and ceramic production of medieval Taurica] (in Russian). Nauka.
- Yakobson, A. L. (1983). Закономерности в развитии раннесредневековой архитектуры [Patterns in the development of early medieval architecture] (in Russian). Nauka.
- Yakobson, A. L. (1984). Сагмосаванк: (Монастырь) [Saghmosavank: (Monastery)] (in Russian). Hayastan.
- Yakobson, A. L. (1985). Закономерности в развитии средневековой архитектуры: Центральные области Византии, Греция, Малая Азия, Сирия, Месопотамия, югославянские страны, Древняя Русь, Закавказье, Средняя Азия [Patterns in the development of medieval architecture: Central regions of Byzantium, Greece, Asia Minor, Syria, Mesopotamia, Yugoslav countries, Ancient Russia, Transcaucasia, Central Asia] (in Russian). Nauka. p. 152.
- Yakobson, A. L. (1986). Армянские хачкары [Armenian khachkars]. Hayastan. p. 104.
- Yakobson, A. L. (1987). Gandzasar: (Monument of Armenian architecture of the 13th century) [Гандзасар: (Памятник армянского зодчества XIII в.)]. Sovetakan grogh.

== Awards ==
- Order of the Red Banner of Labour
- Honorary Diploma of the Supreme Soviet of the Armenian SSR

== Literature ==
- Alexander Kakovkin Anatoly Leopoldovich Yakobson (1906—1984): Necrologue // Vizantijskij Vremennik. Vol. 46 (71). P. 282–283. (in Russian)

== External sources ==
- Tikhonov I. L. Anatoly Leopoldovich Yakobson // Saint Petersburg State University (in Russian)
