= Donald E. Miller =

American theologian (born 1946)

Donald Earl Miller (born March 12, 1946) is an American sociologist of religion, formerly the Leonard K. Firestone Professor at University of Southern California.

== Publications ==
Miller is author, co-author, or editor of the following:

- The Case for Liberal Christianity (Harper & Row, 1981)
- Writing and Research in Religious Studies, with Barry Jay Seltser (Prentice Hall, 1992)
- Homeless Families: The Struggle for Dignity, with Barry Jay Seltser (University of Illinois Press, 1993)
- Survivors: An Oral History of the Armenian Genocide, with Lorna Touryan Miller (University of California Press, 1993)
- Reinventing American Protestantism (University of California Press, 1997)
- GenX Religion, ed. with Richard Flory, (Routledge, 2000)
- Armenia: Portraits of Survival and Hope, with Lorna Touryan Miller and photographs by Jerry Berndt (University of California Press, 2003)
- Global Pentecostalism: The New Face of Christian Social Engagement, with Tetsunao Yamamori (University of California Press, 2007)
- Finding Faith: The Spiritual Quest of the Post-Boomer Generation, with Richard Flory (Rutgers University Press, 2008)
- Spirit and Power: The Growth and Global Impact of Pentecostalism, ed. with Richard Flory & Kimon Sargeant (Oxford University Press, 2013)
- Becoming Human Again: An Oral History of the Rwandan Genocide Against the Tutsi (University of California Press, 2020)
- A Decade of Commercial Fishing in Alaska: Lafayette Fisheries 1981–1991, with John Garner (2021)
