= Alexandra Xanthaki =

Legal scholar and UN expert

Academic background
- Education: University of Keele
- Thesis: Indigenous rights in the United Nations system : self-determination, culture, land (2001)

Alexandra Xanthaki is known for her work on the rights of indigenous peoples and international law. She is a professor of law at Brunel University of London (BUL). She was appointed the United Nations special rapporteur in the field of cultural rights in 2021.

== Education ==
Xanthaki completed her LLB at the National and Kapodistrian University of Athens in Greece in 1994. She undertook an LLM in human rights and emergency law at Queen's University Belfast in Northern Ireland the following year. She moved to Keele University in Staffordshire in the United Kingdom to pursue a Ph.D., where she wrote her thesis on the Rights of Indigenous Peoples in the United Nations.

== Career ==
Xanthaki took up her first academic post at the University of Keele, where she became a lecturer in law in 2000. She joined the University of Liverpool in 2001. In 2004, she moved to Brunel University London. As of 2024 she is the director of research at the Brunel Law School.

In 2021, Xanthaki was appointed the United Nations special rapporteur in the field of cultural rights. In this role, she advised the International Olympic Committee about whether Russian soldiers should be allowed to compete in the Olympic games in Paris in 2024, and discussed the impact of war on cultural identity in Ukraine. She has also considered the implications of teaching children in Tibet Mandarin Chinese, cultural isolation by young aboriginal Australians, and funding for cultural works in Chile.

== Selected publications ==
- Ghanea, N. and Xanthaki, A. (eds) (2004) 'Minorities, peoples and self-determination: essays in honour of Patrick Thornberry'. Dordrecht: Martinus Nijhoff Publishers. ISBN 978-90-04-14301-2
- Xanthaki, A. (2007) 'Indigenous rights and United Nations standards: self-determination, culture, land'. New York: Cambridge University Press. ISBN 978-0-521-83574-9
- Xanthaki, A., Valkonen, S., Heinamaki, L. and Nuogram, PK. (eds) (2017) 'Indigenous peoples' Cultural Heritage: Rights, Debates, Challenges'. Leiden: Brill/Nijhoff. ISBN 978-90-04-34218-7
