= Identicide =

Deliberate destruction of cultural identity

Identicide is the deliberate, systematic and targeted destruction of the places, symbols, objects, including ideas, values and behaviours, and other cultural property that represent the identity of a people, with the intent to erase the cultural narrative and memory of that people, demoralize a population, absorb it into another cultural/political entity, or to rid an area of that people altogether.

Identicide offers a way to frame some of the destructive acts that precede genocide. The international convention on Genocide does not include this predictive framework. Genocidal acts must have already taken place for a situation to be legally termed "genocide". Because it cannot be named as such until after the fact, earlier intentional and destructive acts are often termed 'potential genocide' or 'possible genocide'. Identicide is a term that captures the force of pre-genocidal acts and is a phenomenon unto itself.

In being a series of acts or pre-emptive stages of genocide or as an alternative to genocide, identicide incorporates many of the other more specific phenomena and related activities ending in "-cide", including ethnocide, topocide, terracide, democide, memoricide, urbicide, gendercide, gynocide, sociocide and domicide. These other -cides are elements that contribute to cultural identity, denoting the destruction of a part or aspect of it, whereas identicide determines the destruction of the whole.

Identicide can be a precursor to genocide but does not necessarily result in genocide. Perpetrators of identicide understand that cultural identity is built into places created over centuries of living in place, and a marginalized group can be weakened and unalterably changed through the destruction of their places. The destruction results in people leaving their places, or a loss of distinctiveness in place, and can achieve the result intended by the perpetrators.

== Etymology ==
The term was coined in 1998 by Sarah Jane Meharg, Ph.D. while completing her studies at the Royal Military College of Canada. It was later published in her Masters of Arts (War Studies) thesis in 1999.

According to Meharg, identicide is a deliberate act, normally performed as a tactic of armed conflict, but more specifically is:

a strategy of warfare that deliberately targets and destroys cultural elements of a people through a variety of means in order to contribute to eventual acculturation, removal and/or total destruction of a particular identity group, including its contested signs, symbols, behaviours [sic], values, heritages, places and performances. Identicide is the intentional killing of the relatedness between people and place that eliminates the bond, which underpins individual, community and national identity….Identicide takes many forms but serves a single function: to negatively affect the relationships between people and their places.

== Cultural geography and identity ==
Identicide, as argued by Meharg, is centered around erasing the link between people and their places, in order to weaken cultural identity and create anomie. These roots of identity are not only embedded within the people who inhabit a certain region, but also among the cultural infrastructure (i.e. castles, houses, engineering feats, routes/paths, bridges etc.), symbols (i.e. monuments, statues), signs, language (i.e. any form of literature, libraries), and social behaviors that support the functionality and cohesiveness a given community and contribute to their uniqueness and specificity that could be recalled, affecting the memory of their unique heritage, historical power and environment and ethnic leverage in a region over time. The continued presence of such material and places allow a people's identity to continue to live on, whether those people still exist, have evolved or have been eliminated, and as such their identity remains preserved in the memory of mankind and society. Such examples include monuments and statues, which "are best thought of as devices of communication rather than aesthetic representations: as such, they underscore…the 'reworking of memory.'"

Monica Duffy Toft, academic, states that identicide may emerge when the central national identity of a group is challenged by differential demographic growth rates.

== Difference from cultural genocide ==
Cultural genocide refers to the systematic destruction of a group's cultural identity, traditions, language, and institutions. This includes banning native languages, destroying historical sites, and outlawing cultural practices.

Examples of cultural genocide:

- Canada's Residential Schools (19th–20th century): Indigenous children were forcibly removed from their families, forbidden to speak their languages, and stripped of cultural traditions in an attempt to erase Indigenous culture.
- China's suppression of Uyghur culture: The Chinese government has detained Uyghurs in re-education camps, banned Islamic practices, and forced Mandarin language assimilation to destroy Uyghur cultural identity.

=== Comparison ===
Another example of identicide is in the case of the "Stolen Generations" of Australia (1910s–1970s), when aboriginal children were forcibly taken from their families, given new names, and raised in non-Indigenous households to prevent them from identifying as Aboriginal. Both Canada and Australia implemented policies that forcibly removed Indigenous children from their families, aiming to assimilate them into settler society and erase their cultural identities. So while Canada's Residential Schools were a form of cultural genocide (aiming to eradicate Indigenous culture), Australia's Stolen Generations also engaged in identicide by actively severing the children's ability to recognize themselves as Aboriginal.

When compared to cultural genocide, identicide goes further by specifically targeting the ability of individuals to identify as part of a distinct group. It involves erasing not just cultural elements but the markers that allow people to recognize themselves as members of that group. This can include suppressing historical memory, eliminating identity records, or forcing individuals to assimilate in ways that make it impossible for them to reclaim their heritage.

== Implementation ==
Identicide includes willful acts of destruction of the places, symbols, objects and other cultural property that represents the identity of a people, with the intent to erase the cultural narrative of that people in a particular region over time. Targets are often "symbolic landscapes" that, according to Sarah Jane Meharg, "create a particularity of place, [and] also act as narratives of collective memory that underpin the cohesion and identity of groups." The tactics involved in identicide eliminate the bond between places and people, and include (but are not restricted to) the burning of libraries and literature, the bombing of symbolic and sacred sites, forced assimilation, as well as the appropriation of the vernacular places that have no military importance during conflict with the exception that a group of people is rooted to these places.

=== During armed conflict ===
The co-opting of place by identity groups is a threat to the status quo during conflicts, and it becomes a tactical approach to destroy that which represents identity (beliefs, ways, practices, rituals) and which inspires them as a people; this last point contributes to the end objective of sustaining gains in warfare by a belligerent by eliminating the ability of an enemy to retaliate in destroying its will through erasing its identity. Belligerents seek to systematically destroy identity elements, causing anomie and other behavioral and attitudinal reactions, which can result in the group moving away, or submitting to control.

==== Examples ====
Examples of identicide can be observed in the destruction of the Bridge of Mostar and the National and University Library in Bosnia and Herzegovina, and the willful damage of Islamic iconography and archaeological treasures such as Palmyra by ISIL in Syria. During the Bosnian War, Bosnian Croat forces destroyed the Stari Most (Old Bridge) in Mostar (1993), erasing a centuries-old symbol of the city's multicultural identity, while Serbian forces burned the National and University Library of Bosnia and Herzegovina (1992), destroying over two million books and archives in an attempt to erase Bosnian intellectual and historical heritage. Similarly, ISIL's systematic destruction of Palmyra's archaeological treasures (2015–2017) in Syria sought to eliminate physical remnants of the region's diverse Greco-Roman, Persian, and Arab influences, reinforcing their rigid ideological narrative. These acts of cultural erasure were not just attacks on physical structures but deliberate attempts to obliterate historical memory and identity.

Other examples include:

- The destruction of National and University Library of Sarajevo, Bosnia and Herzegovina.
- The destruction of Stari Most, Bosnia and Herzegovina.
- The destruction of the Bamiyan Buddhas, Afghanistan.

=== In peacetime ===
Identicide can take many forms, not only in times of war but also through prolonged and systematic policies enacted during peacetime. Longer term and more subtle acts, such as absorbing and integrating a culture within another through the transformation of religion, language, and social practices, or imposing/preventing demographic shifts within a community, with a final outcome to deliberately eliminate the remnants of a specific people and their landscape, could also be viewed as forms of identicide.

==== Examples ====
- Renaming of Māori place names in New Zealand.
- Renaming of English and French place names in Montreal, Canada.
- Renaming of Palestinian villages and places from Arabic to Hebrew names and of Jewish villages and places in Palestine from Hebrew to Arabic after establishment of the State of Israel.

== Sources ==
- Pappe, Ilan (2007–09) The Ethnic Cleansing of Palestine, Oneworld Publications; Second edition (September 1, 2007) ISBN 9781851685554
