= Lemkin Institute =

Multinational genocide prevention organization

Lemkin Institute for Genocide Prevention
- Abbreviation: LIGP
- Established: 2021
- Type: Nonprofit
- Headquarters: United States
- Website: www.lemkininstitute.com

The Lemkin Institute for Genocide Prevention (LIGP), or simply Lemkin Institute, is a non-governmental organization based in the United States that publishes alerts, statements, and reports applying a broad definition of genocide to conflicts and political situations. Since 2024, it has been a member of Global Action Against Mass Atrocity Crimes (GAAMAC), a network of States, civil society organizations, and academic institutions seeking to prevent atrocities.

The institute has issued genocide warnings related to the expulsion of Armenians from Nagorno-Karabakh, Gaza war, second Trump presidency in the United States, and treatment of transgender people in the United States and United Kingdom.

== Background ==
In 2017, Elisa von Joeden-Forgey and Irene Victoria Massimino founded the Iraq Project for Genocide Prevention and Accountability to address the need for long-term capacity building in genocide prevention in Iraq following the Yazidi genocide. They wrote:

We noticed during several trips to northern Iraq in 2016 and 2017 that very little of the work that goes on at high levels of governments, in international organizations, and among large civil society groups ever reaches people facing genocide and mass atrocity, although they are the people for whom all this work is supposed to be done.

The project leaders argued in the following years that global prevention protocols remained insufficient. In August 2021, the project, which had evolved beyond its original mandate, was renamed the Lemkin Institute for Genocide Prevention after Raphael Lemkin (1900–1959), a Polish-Jewish lawyer and Holocaust survivor who coined the term genocide. Originally registered as a nonprofit corporation in Pennsylvania, the Lemkin Institute obtained federal tax-exempt status in September 2023. In 2024, Massimino left the institute.

== Aims ==
The Lemkin Institute explain their aims are to identify genocide as a process that can be categorized into ten patterns, rather than as a single event. This framework makes its definition (like many definitions of genocide) broader than today's most dominant definition as found in the 1948 Genocide Convention.

== Actions ==
The Lemkin Institute works to advance its ideas of genocide prevention through its publication of Red Flag alerts for genocide, statements, reports, as well as through court submissions and training developed with educational institutions.

=== Armenia and Nagorno-Karabakh ===
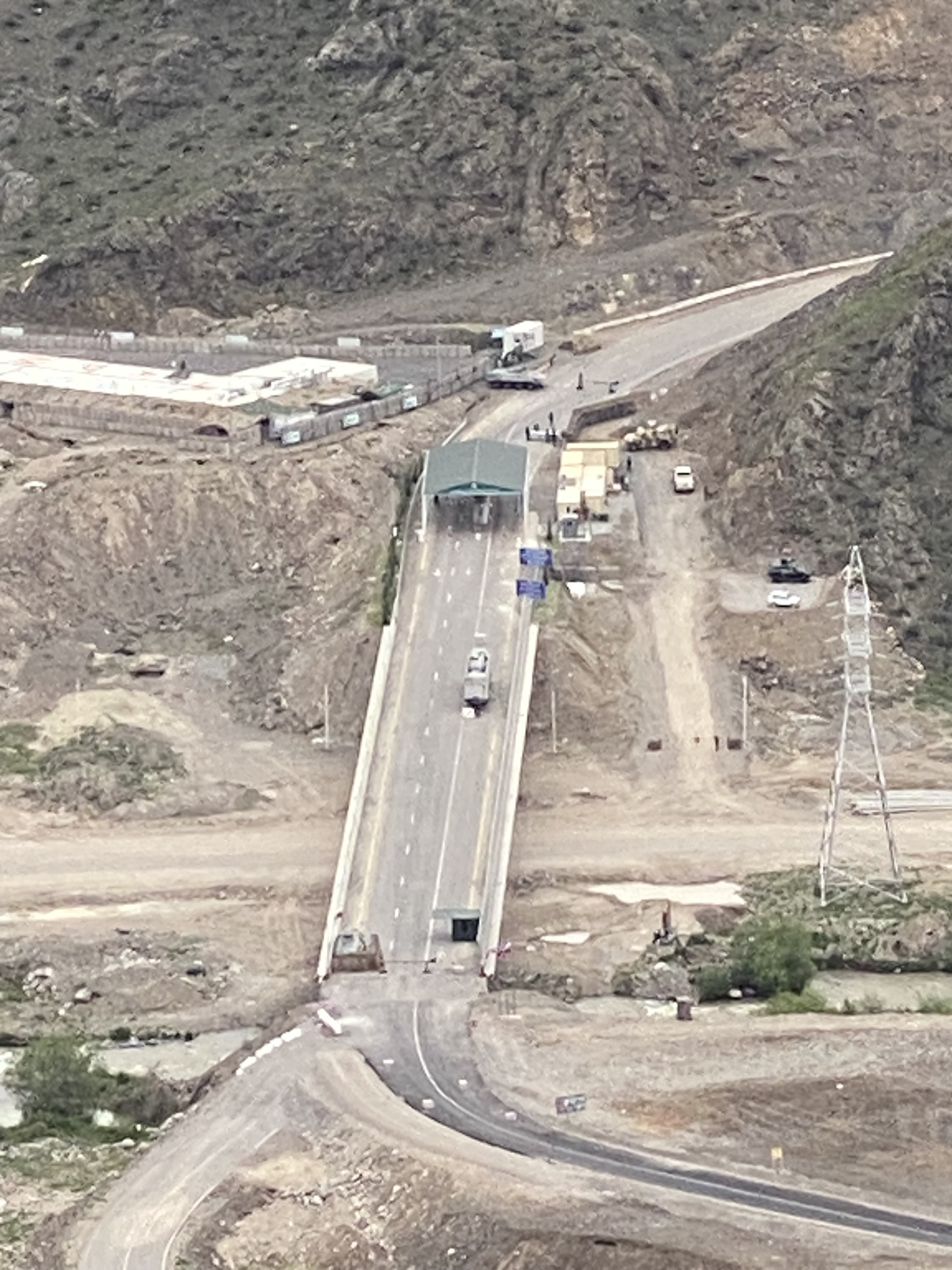
Azerbaijani Checkpoint at the Lachin Corridor, as viewed from Kornidzor, Armenia

In 2021, the Lemkin Institute began warning of the "potential for genocidal violence" against Armenians, particularly those in Artsakh, from Azerbaijan. After BBC's HARDtalk, Stephen Sackur suggested in an interview with Artsakh State Minister Ruben Vardanyan that Nagorno-Karabakh should work out a political deal with Azerbaijan, the Institute issued a statement criticizing the anchor. It published repeatedly about "the genocidal processes" unfolding in Nagorno-Karabakh as Azerbaijani forces blockaded the Lachin Corridor, which the co-founders had observed during a visit to the region on May 7, 2023.

In September 2023, it issued an SOS Alert following Azerbaijan's initiation of its significant military assault on Nagorno-Karabakh saying Armenians there are "currently being attacked by the genocidal regime of Azerbaijani President Ilham Aliyev" and that various legal experts agreed Azeri actions constituted genocide. Through 2023, it also issued an Active Genocide alert and 9 Red Flag alerts on Azerbaijan, warning "the risk of genocide" of Armenians in Artsakh, calling for Azerbaijan's accountability for the accusations of crimes against humanity. It further published a 126-page report on the risk of genocide by Azerbaijan in Artsakh, using the UN Framework of Analysis for Atrocity Crimes in September 2023. This report also issued a warning regarding the subsequent occurrences such as the forced displacement of Armenians from Artsakh.

=== Bangladesh ===
In 2021, the Lemkin Institute issued a report on the Bangladesh genocide. Alongside this the Lemkin Institute worked with the Liberation War Museum in Dhaka to develop a micro-course covering the genocide. In 2022 issued a call advocating for the acknowledgment of the genocide by international institutions and governments. Emphasizing solidarity with the victims, the document highlighted the significance of recognizing genocide as a crucial step in preventing such atrocities. It stressed the importance of acknowledging the victims, their suffering, and promoting accountability and justice. According to the Human Rights Congress for Bangladesh Minorities, the Lemkin Institute called on the US Congress to officially acknowledge the 1971 Bangladesh genocide and ensure that those responsible for the atrocities are held accountable.

=== Ethiopia ===
In 2023, the Institute issued a Red Flag alert for the killings of Amharas in Ethiopia.

=== Israel/Palestine 2023–2025 ===
In January 2023, the Lemkin Institute began warning of the potential for genocidal violence by Israel. Their warnings elevated to an active genocide alert after the beginning of the Gaza war, releasing a statement that identified and condemned atrocities and genocidal intent by both Hamas and Israel. On October 27, the Lemkin Institute stated that "[Israel and the US] are committing genocide in Gaza only weeks after enabling genocide on another besieged people" (referring to the Armenians of Artsakh). The institute has also criticized western media coverage of the war for "avoiding historical context", "shifting responsibility away" from the state of Israel, distorting the public perception of the conduct of Israel, and "ensuring the public will remain ignorant" of the relevant international law. In September 2025, the Lemkin Institute expressed support for the Global Sumud Flotilla. On December 9, 2025, it accused Hillary Clinton of denial of the Gaza genocide in her remarks at the December 2 Israel Hayom summit.

=== Russia/Ukraine ===
In 2022, the Lemkin Institute put out statements covering atrocities perpetrated by Russia in Ukraine, including the forced transfer of children, labelling these as genocidal. In 2022 and 2023, the institute, with the Regional Center for Human Rights, submitted communications with the registry of the International Criminal Court about the forcible transfer of Ukrainian children since 2014, and the delay from Russia in repatriating them.

=== United States (2025) ===
On the day of the second inauguration of Donald Trump, the Institute issued a Red Flag alert for Genocide in the United States. This alert was precipitated by the Elon Musk salute controversy, which occurred at the inauguration, where Musk twice performed a Nazi salute or Roman salute. The Institute released their alert shortly after the incident, noting their concerns for the protection of rights for displaced people like refugees and LGBTQ individuals, and the potential for democratic backsliding under the new incoming Trump administration, which appeared favorable to autocratic leaders abroad.

=== Transgender people ===
The Lemkin Institute has described gender critical feminism as a "genocidal ideology that seeks the complete eradication of trans identity from around the world". In a statement on the issue, the Lemkin Institute argued that rhetoric from anti-trans activists depicting trans women as dangerous were not based on fact, but instead as essential to manufacturing consent for anti-trans violence. In 2022, the Lemkin Institute declared anti-trans legislation in the United States as genocidal. From 2023 to 2026, the Lemkin Institute issued three Red Flag alerts due to political developments in the US regarding transgender people.

In June 2025, the Lemkin Institute issued a statement on transgender and intersex rights in the United Kingdom (UK), stating that the actions of UK state institutions, including the EHRC's guidance and the actions of the UK Supreme Court constitute part of a "broader process of erasure". According to the institute, "All the actions described [in its report] fit neatly into the 9th Pattern of Genocide: 'Denial and/or Prevention of Identity.'"

== Naming dispute ==
Joseph Lemkin, a US lawyer who is Raphael Lemkin's relative stated to Algemeiner Journal that he objected to the Lemkin Institute's use of the Lemkin name and its use of the word genocide for the Gaza genocide, with other relatives highlighting Lemkin's zionism. Joseph Lemkin threatened to sue the Lemkin Institute over the naming dispute, and in April 2026, Joseph Lemkin and the European Jewish Association submitted a legal memorandum to the Pennsylvania Bureau of Corporations and Charitable Organizations. The Simon Wiesenthal Center also expressed outrage over the Lemkin Institute's use of Lemkin's name while labelling Gaza a genocide.

Vladimir Khanin and Ariel Kogan, in an article for the Institute for the Study of Global Antisemitism and Policy, argue that the institute acts a "node" in a "global ecosystem of antisemitic narratives", claiming that the Lemkin Institute is weaponizing Raphael Lemkin's name to attack Israel.
