= Khash (dish) =

Traditional dish in western Asia

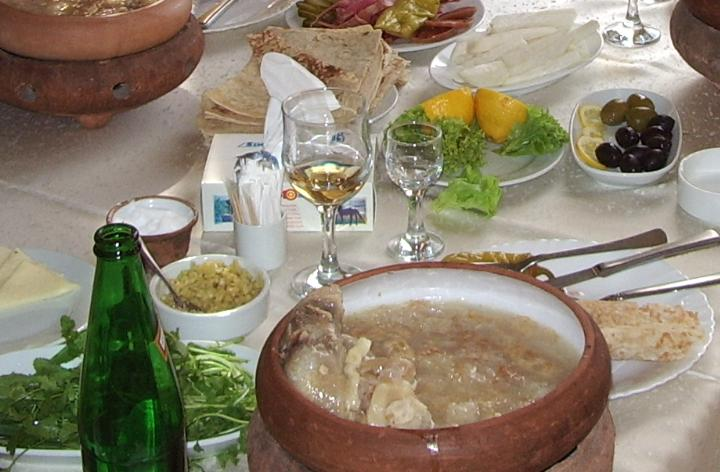
- Armenian khash
- Place of origin: Armenia
- Associated cuisine: Armenian cuisine

Khash (Armenian: խաշ) is a traditional dish made from a boiled cow or sheep parts, which might include the head, feet, and stomach (tripe). It originates from Armenia and is considered one of the oldest Armenian dishes.

In addition to Armenia, khash and its variations are also found in several other countries, including Afghanistan, Albania, Azerbaijan, Bosnia and Herzegovina, Bulgaria, Georgia, Greece, Iran, Iraq, Mongolia, North Macedonia, Turkey, and some Persian Gulf countries.

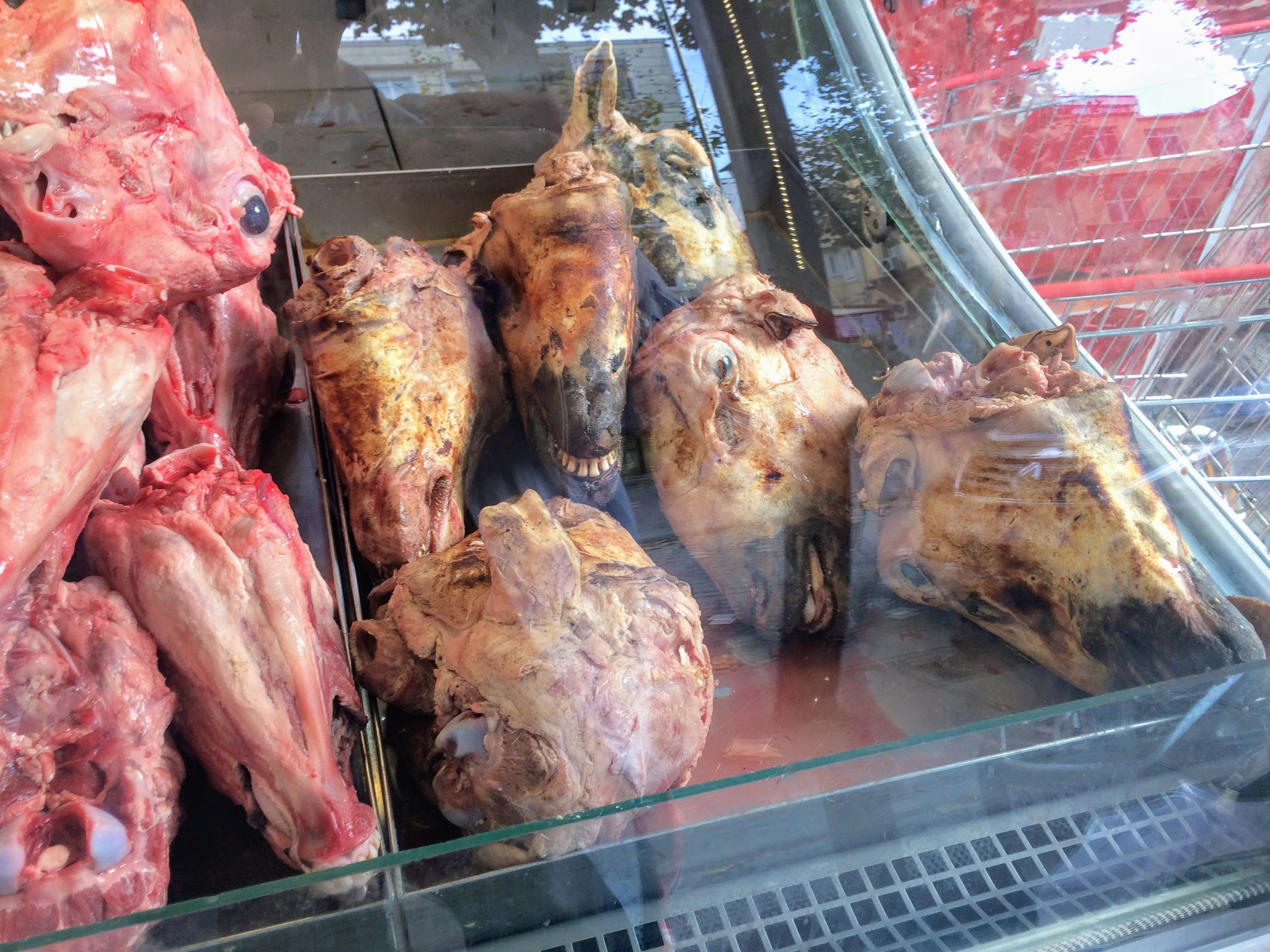
Fresh and prebaked sheep heads being sold in a market

== Etymology ==
The name khash originates from the Armenian verb (խաշել), which means "to boil". The dish, initially called khashoy (Armenian: խաշոյ), is mentioned by a number of medieval Armenian authors, including Grigor Magistros (11th century), Mkhitar Heratsi (12th century), and Yesayi Nchetsi (13th century).

The Persian designation pacha stems from the term pāče, literally meaning "trotter". The combination of a sheep's head and trotters is called kalle-pāče, which literally means "head [and] trotter" in Persian.

Khash is also known by derivations like khashi and xash (Georgian: ხაში; and Azerbaijani: xaş, respectively), while also being known by other designations, namely pacha (Persian: پاچه; Albanian: paçe; Neo-Aramaic: pacha; Mesopotamian Arabic: پاچة, romanized: pacha; Serbo-Croatian: pača; Bulgarian: пача; Hungarian: pacal; Greek: πατσάς), kalle-pache (Persian: کله‌پاچه; Turkish: kelle paça; Azerbaijani: kəllə-paça), kakaj šürpi (Chuvash: какай шÿрпи) or serûpê (Kurdish: سه‌روپێ).

== In the South Caucasus ==
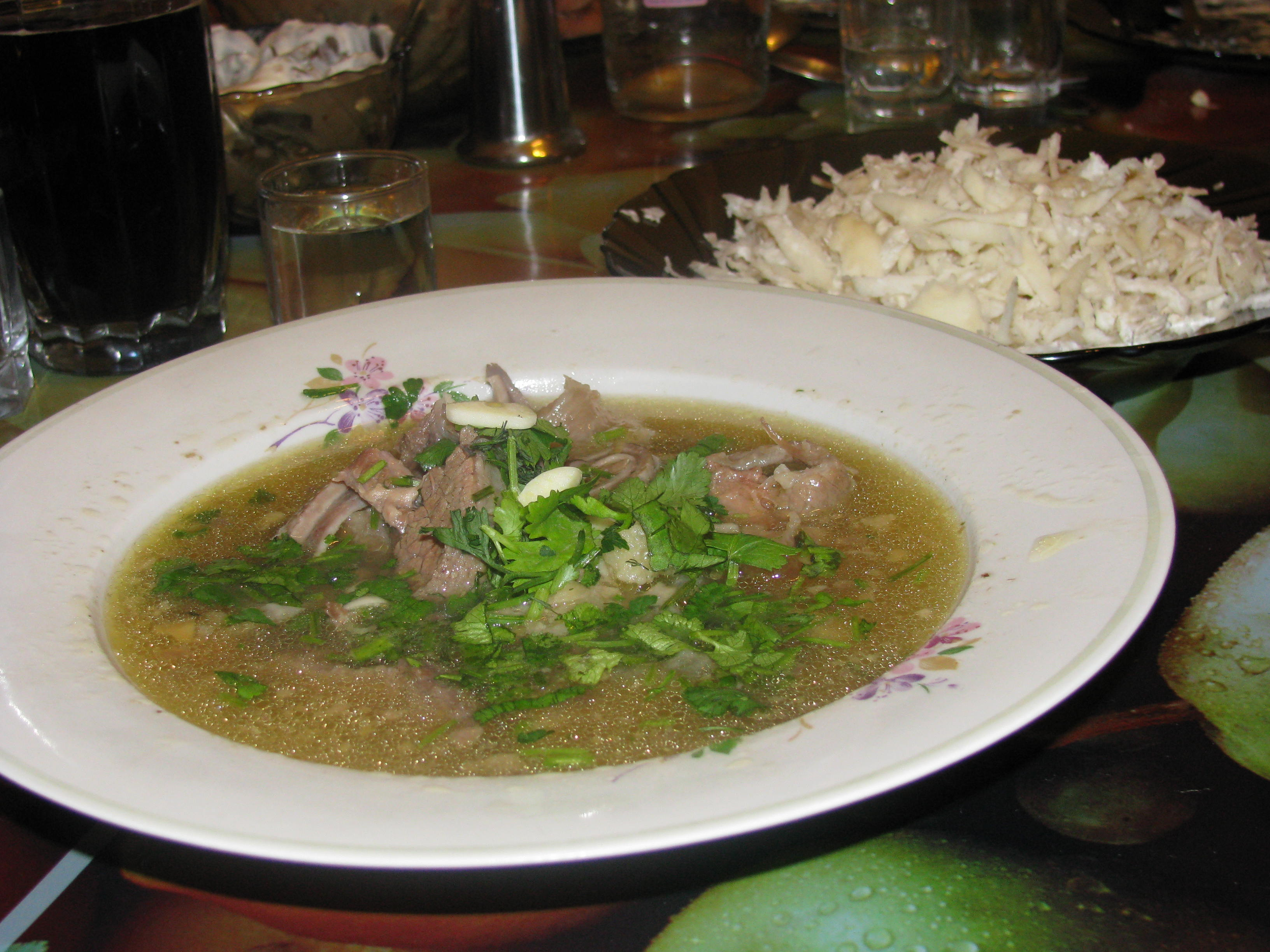
A portion of khash

In the medieval Armenian medical textbook Relief of Fevers (1184), khash was described as a dish with healing properties, e.g., against snuffle. It was recommended to eat it while drinking wine. In case of ailment, khash from the legs of a yeanling (lamb or kid) was advised.

Armenian khash is prepared using boiled cow or sheep parts such as the head, feet, and stomach (tripe). Typically consumed early in the morning during the winter season, it is served with garlic, salt, black pepper and lavash. In Armenia and the rest of the South Caucasus, khash is often seen as food to be consumed after a party, as it is known to be consumed during battle hangovers (especially by men) and eaten with a "hair of the dog" vodka chaser.

== In Iran ==
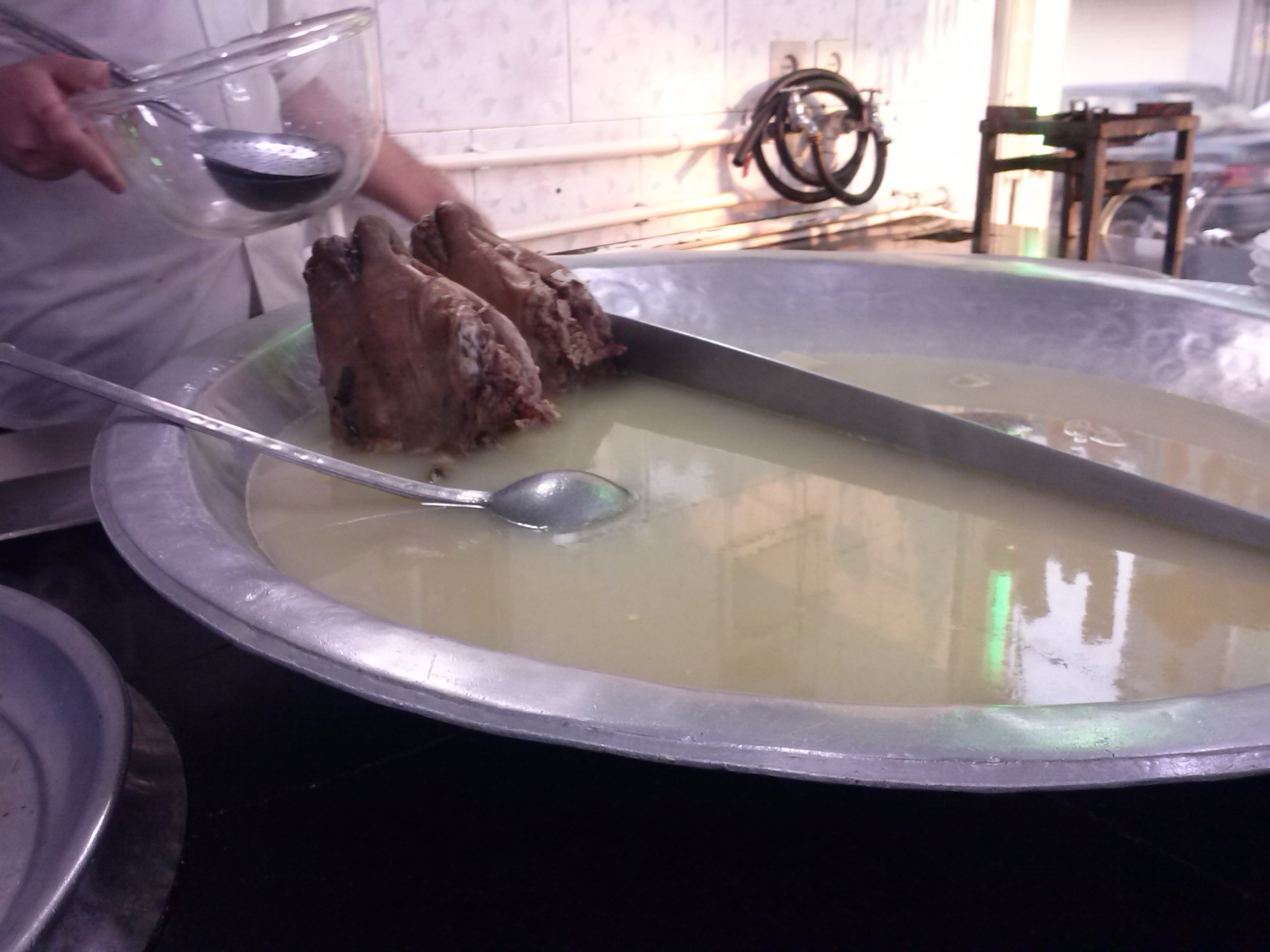
Kalle-pache (kalle-pāče) in Tehran

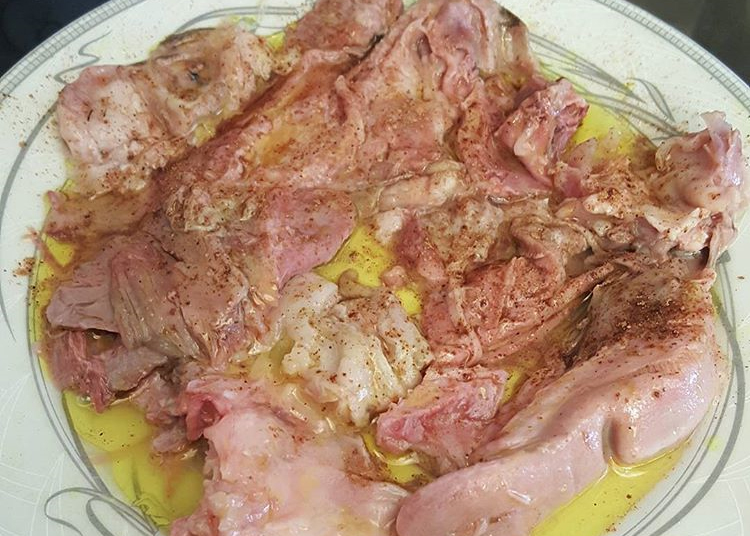
An Iranian pache (pāče) dish

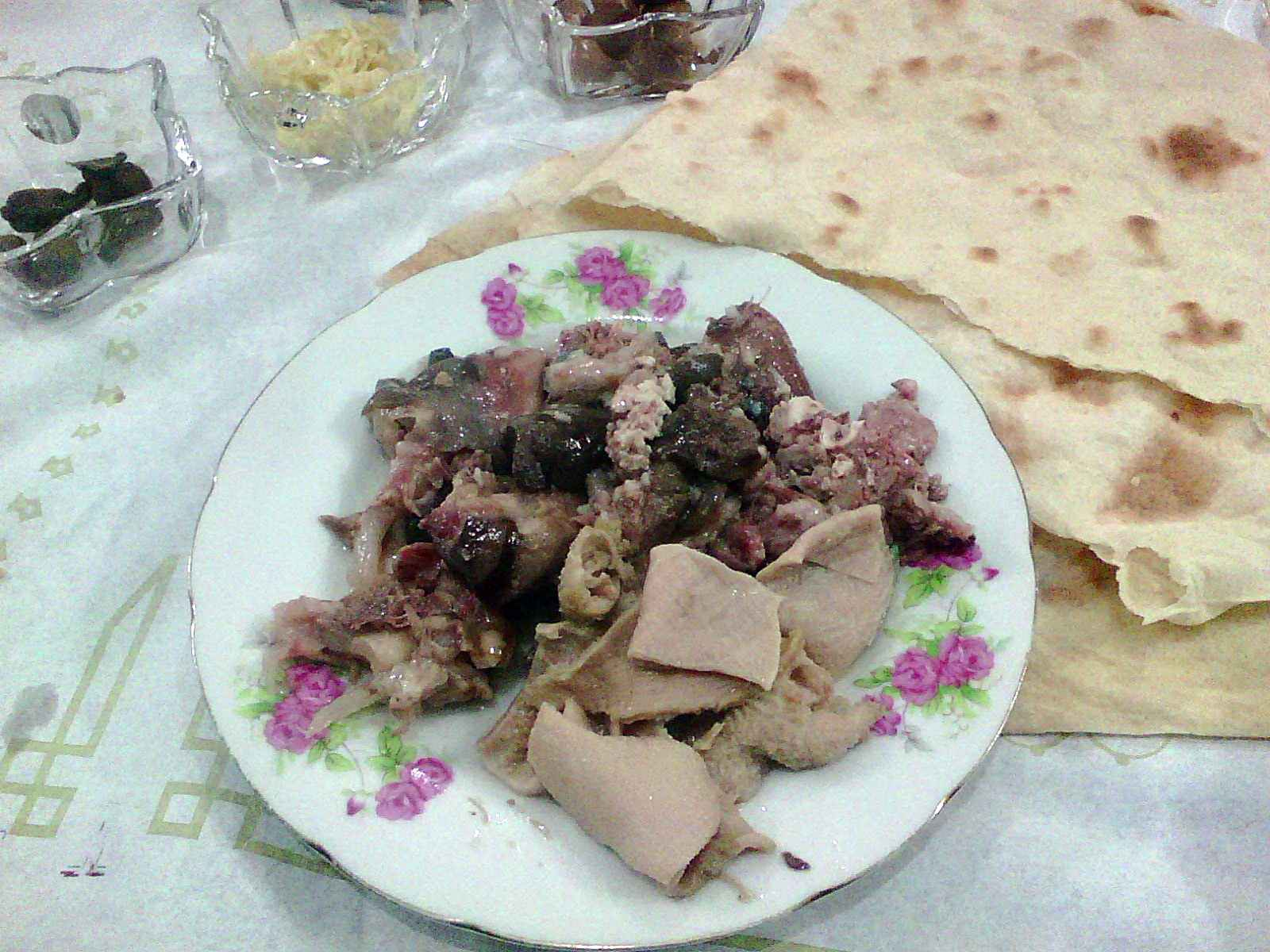
Iranian khash

Kalle-pache (kalle-pāče; kalla-pāča; literally meaning "head [and] trotter") consists of a sheep's head (including the brain) and trotters, and is typically seasoned with lemon and cinnamon. Usually consumed as a breakfast soup, kalle-pache is traditional to Afghanistan and Iran.

In Iran, kalle-pache is usually cooked in specialty stores, and is served in the morning. It is especially consumed during cold seasons. To prepare kalle-pache, the sheep's head and trotters are collected, cooked, and treated as per the recipe.

== In Iraq ==
Pacha is a traditional Iraqi dish made from sheep's head, trotters, and stomach; all boiled slowly and served with bread sunken in the broth. The cheeks and tongues are considered the best parts. Many people prefer not to eat the eyeballs, which could be removed before cooking. The stomach lining would be filled with rice and lamb and stitched with a sewing thread (Arabic: كيبايات). Sheep brain is also included.

Pacha is a common dish for Assyrians to eat around Christmas, but preparations of the dish take a long time.

== In Arab countries ==
The dish is known in Kuwait, Bahrain, and other Arabian Peninsula countries as Pacheh (باجه), since the Arabic alphabet has no letters 'p' and 'ch' so the dish is written with 'b' and 'j' as in Bajeh باجه). A variation of that is found in other Arab countries such as in Egypt and is known as kawari' (كوارع), Egyptians eat cow brain and sheep brain.

== In Albania ==
Albania's popular pache (paçe) consists of a sheep's or any cattle's head, that is boiled until meat comes off easily. It is then stewed with garlic, onion, black pepper, and vinegar. Sometimes a little flour is added to thicken the stew. It is also frequently cooked with cattle feet or tripe. It makes a hot and hearty winter stew.

== In Turkey ==
In Turkish culinary culture, pacha (paça) is a generic word for certain soup preparations, especially with offal, but also without it. In most parts of Turkey, such as in Kastamonu, for instance, the term ayak paça ("feet pacha") is used for cow, sheep, or goat hooves, and the term kelle paça is used for "head pacha" (chorba). Sometimes the term dil paça is also used for tongue soup, while "meat pacha" is made with gerdan (scrag end of sheep's neck). In Turkey, the word kelle refers to a sheep's head roasted in the oven, which is served after grilling at specialized offal restaurants.

== In Greece ==
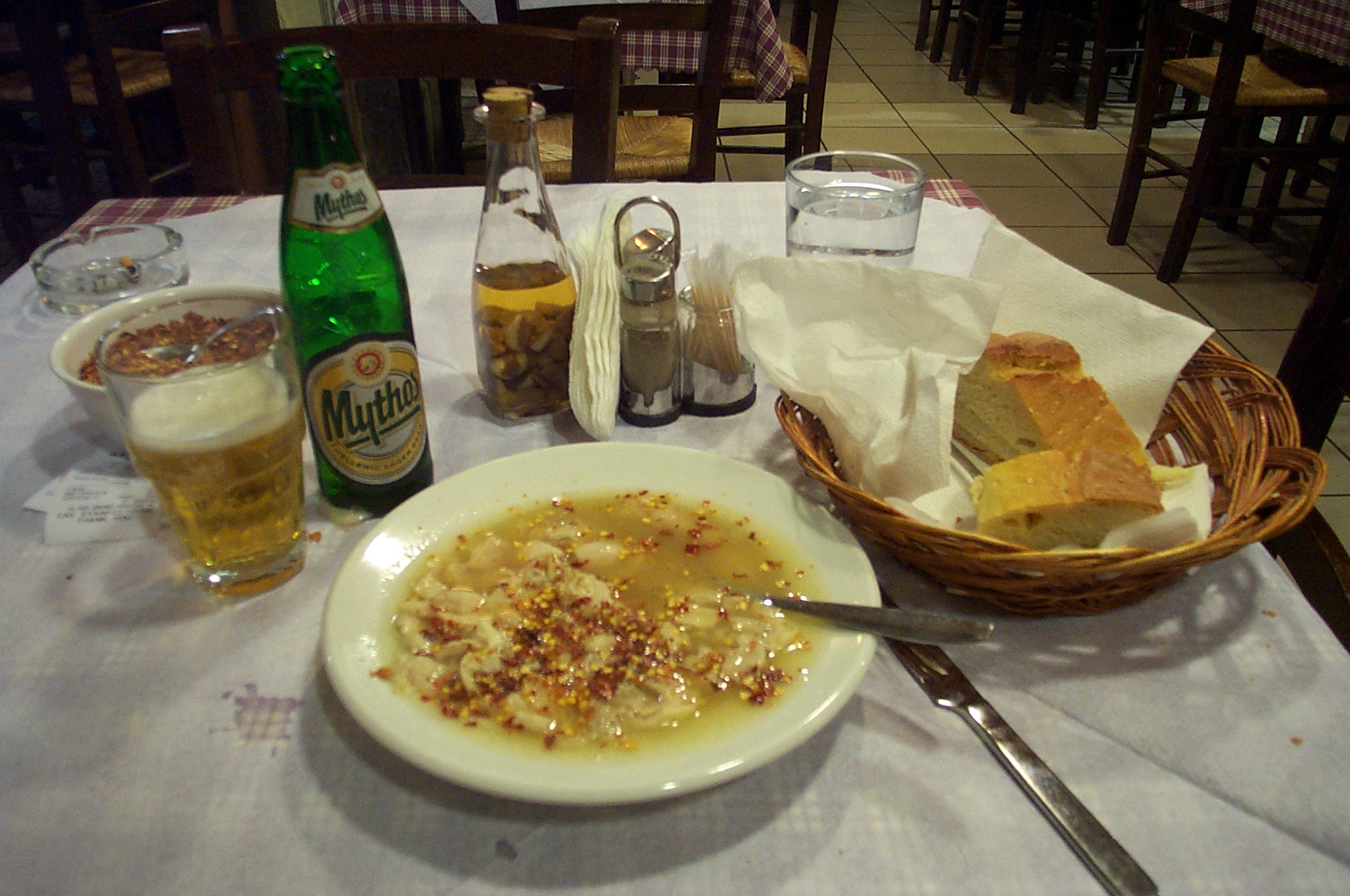
A bowl of Greek patsás (with skordostoubi and hot pepper flakes)

The Greek version, called patsás (πατσάς), may be seasoned with red wine vinegar and garlic (skordostoubi), or thickened with avgolémono. The Greek version sometimes uses calf feet with the tripe.

Specialized tavernas serving patsa are known as patsatzidika. Because patsas has the reputation of remedying hang-over and aiding digestion, patsatzidika are often working overnight, serving people returning home after dinner or clubbing.

== Similar dishes ==
- Paya, South Asian version of this dish
- P'tcha, Ashkenazi Jewish version
- Smalahove, boiled sheep's head, a traditional western Norwegian food
- Soğuk paça, a Turkish cold dish made with the jelly obtained from sheep or cow hooves
- Svið, an Icelandic dish that includes a sheep's head cut in half

== See also ==
- Aspic
- Beshbarmak
- Chitterlings
- Haggis
- Head cheese
- Powsowdie
- Tripe chorba
