= Hatsik =

Hatsik may refer to:

- Hatsik, Armavir, Armenia
- Hatsik, Shirak, Armenia
