= Mkhitar Heratsi Medal =

Armenian state medal for healthcare

- The insignia of the Mkhitar Heratsi Medal
- Native name: Մխիթար Հերացու մեդալ
- Type: State medal
- Awarded for: Services to the development of healthcare in Armenia, high professionalism, and philanthropic activity
- Country: Armenia
- Presented by: President of Armenia
- Eligibility: Сivilian and military doctors, medical personnel, pharmacists, and philanthropists
- Status: Currently awarded
- Established: 26 July 1993
- Service ribbon

Precedence
- Next (higher): Mkhitar Gosh Medal
- Next (lower): Anania Shirakatsi Medal

The Mkhitar Heratsi Medal (Armenian: Մխիթար Հերացու մեդալ) is a state medal of the Republic of Armenia, awarded by the President of Armenia for services to the development of healthcare and medicine in Armenia, high professional and practical work, and significant charitable activity.

It is named after Mkhitar Heratsi, a 12th-century Armenian physician and author of Relief of Fevers, who is regarded as a founding figure of Armenian medicine.

== History ==
The medal was established by law on 26 July 1993, alongside several other state medals of Armenia, including the Mkhitar Gosh Medal, Anania Shirakatsi Medal, and Movses Khorenatsi Medal.

== Award criteria ==
The medal is awarded to civilian and military doctors, junior and mid-level medical personnel, pharmacists, philanthropists, and other individuals in recognition of their contribution to the development of healthcare, medical services, and philanthropy in Armenia.

== Recipients ==
The medal has been awarded to numerous physicians and healthcare workers by presidential decree. Recipients have included resuscitation specialists of Armenia's National Lung Center, honoured by President Armen Sargsyan for their role in providing medical and humanitarian assistance to civilians affected by armed conflict, and oncologist Gagik Jilavyan, awarded the medal by President Vahagn Khachaturyan on the occasion of the 75th anniversary of the National Center of Oncology.

== See also ==
- Orders, decorations, and medals of Armenia
