= Gurgen Dalibaltayan =

Armenian military commander (1926–2015)

National Hero of Armenia Gurgen Dalibaltayan
- Գուրգեն Դալիբալթայան
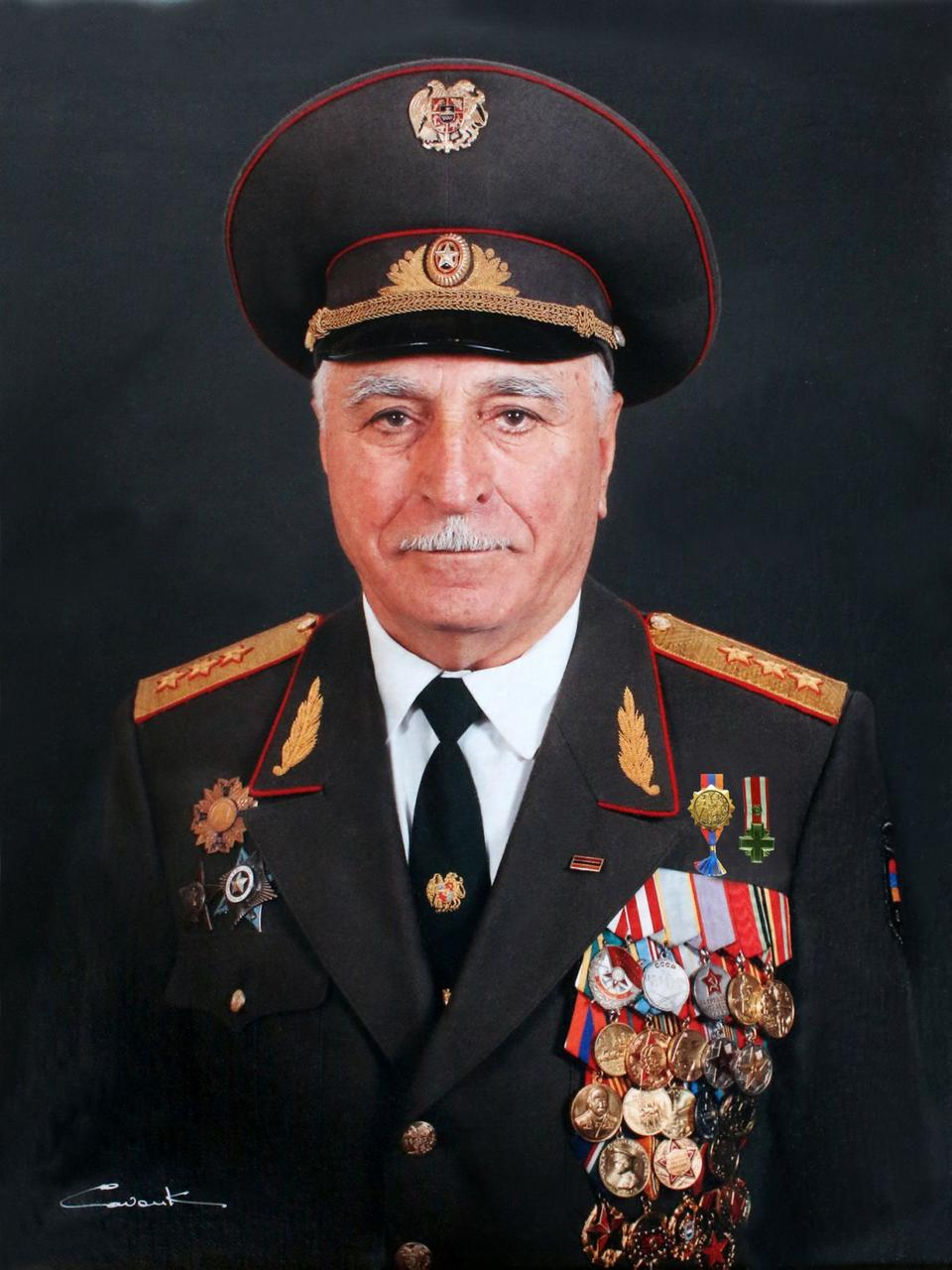
- Born: 5 June 1926; Ninotsminda, Transcaucasian SFSR, Soviet Union
- Died: 1 September 2015 (aged 89); Yerevan, Armenia
- Military career
- Allegiance: Soviet Union; Armenia
- Branch: Soviet Army; Armed Forces of Armenia
- Service years: 1947–2015
- Rank: Colonel-General
- Commands: 34th Infantry Regiment; 60th Infantry Division; 242nd Infantry Division
- Conflicts: First Nagorno-Karabakh War; Battle of Shusha; Battle of Kalbajar
- Awards: see below

Gurgen Harutyun Dalibaltayan (Armenian: Գուրգեն Հարությունի Դալիբալթայան; 5 June 1926 – 1 September 2015) was an Armenian military commander. He was the Chief of General Staff of Armenian Armed Forces during the 1992 Battle of Shusha, a battle to capture the city from Azerbaijan. He is credited with devising a strategy to assault the strongly fortified town of Shusha using diversionary attacks against adjacent villages to draw out the defenders of the town while the commander of troops, Arkady Ter-Tatevosyan, encircled the town and cut off reinforcements. His strategy is generally considered impossible, or at least implausible, as he was originally outnumbered. General military tactics suggest a force of three times the defender's size to successfully storm and win.

== Early life ==
Dalibaltayan was born in the Armenian-populated town of Bogdanovka (present-day Ninotsminda, Samtskhe-Javakheti, Georgia) to Armenian parents, near the border with Armenia. He attended the Secondary School of Gorelovka from 1934 to 1944. Upon graduating, he spent three years at the Tbilisi School of Infantry. Dalibaltayan then joined the ranks of the Soviet Army.

== Military career ==
=== Soviet Army ===
Dalibaltayan held various commanding positions in Echmiadzin, Yerevan, Perekeshkul, Prishib, Kirovabad, Abakan and Rostov-on-Don during his service in the Soviet Armed Forces. He was the commander of the 242nd Infantry Division of the Siberian Military District from 1969 to 1975. Outside of the USSR, he was Deputy Chief of Staff from 1975 to 1980 for the Southern Group of Forces in Budapest. He had also participated in higher academic courses for commanders at the Military Academy of the General Staff of the Armed Forces of the USSR (now Russia) in 1976 and 1978. Dalibaltayan held his final position starting in 1987 as Deputy Commander of the North Caucasus Military District for combat training in Rostov-on-Don. In 1991, he left the Soviet Armed Forces prior to the Fall of the Soviet Union.

=== Armenian Army ===
The Armed Forces of Armenia, the country of origin for Dalibaltayan, had soon afterward joined him amongst its ranks. Dalibaltayan was appointed Chief of Staff of the Defence Committee of the Council of Ministers of Armenia in 1991. Within the same year, he had been promoted to Chief of the General Staff of the Armenia and also became the first Deputy Defence Minister of Armenia. Dalibaltayan was one of the leaders of the Armenian military during the First Nagorno-Karabakh War. He was the commander of Armenian forces for the Battle of Shusha, with the assistance of Arkady Ter-Tadevosyan. All of the military factors were in the favor of the Azeri Army. The Azeris had advantage in terms of the quantity and the quality of military equipment. They held a numerical superiority and also held the high ground. Due to the strategic position of Shusha, the town could be easily defended. Therefore, a direct attack by Armenian forces was not a viable option for Dalibaltayan. Furthermore, according to military conventions and practices, for the operation to be successful, the Armenians would have to outnumber the Azeris by at least 3–4 times (even more when attacking an elevation), with no such manpower available at the time. Instead, together Dalibaltayan and Ter-Tadevosyan devised a strategy of launching several diversionary attacks against the adjacent villages to draw out the defenders of Shusha, while the Armenian forces would in the meantime encircle and cut off the town from further reinforcements. The capture was a success and proved to be a turning point in the war in favor of Armenia. The date Shusha was captured, 9 May 1992, is celebrated as Victory Day in Armenia, also coincidentally coinciding with the end of the Great Patriotic War during World War II.

Following the war, he worked as the Advisor to the President of Armenia and the chief military inspector from 1993 to 2007. As of 2007, he was the Senior Advisor to the Minister of Defense.

== Personal life ==
He was married to Shushanik Dalibaltayan (née Khachatryan). They have two children, a daughter Varduhi (b. 1952) and a son Varazdat (b. 1954). Dalibaltayan was an honorary citizen of Yerevan. He died on 1 September 2015 at the age of 89.

== Awards ==
- (Soviet Union) Order of the Red Banner
- (Soviet Union) Order of the Red Star
- (Soviet Union) Order for Service to the Homeland in the Armed Forces of the USSR, 3rd class
- (Armenia) Order of the Combat Cross, 1st degree (1998)
- (Armenia) Medal "For Services to the Fatherland"
- (Armenia) Medal "For Distinguished Service", 1st class
- (Armenia) Medal "For Distinguished Service", 2nd class
- (Armenia) Order of Nerses the Gracious
- (Republic of Artsakh) Order of the Combat Cross, 1st degree (2000)
- National Hero of Armenia (2021, posthumously)
