= Order of the Combat Cross =

Order of the Combat Cross Armenian: Մարտական խաչ շքանշան
- Order of the Combat Cross Second Class, First Class
- Type: Military order
- Awarded for: Exceptional courage, self-sacrifice and skill demonstrated while defending and ensuring the security of the Motherland
- Country: Armenia
- Presented by: President of Armenia
- Eligibility: Military personnel, military units, and other persons
- Clasps: Two classes
- Status: Active
- Established: 22 April 1994

Precedence
- Next (higher): Order of Tigran the Great
- Next (lower): Order of Saint Vardan Mamikonian

The Order of the Combat Cross (Armenian: Մարտական խաչ շքանշան) is a state award of Armenia. It is awarded mostly to members of the Armed Forces of Armenia among other for absolute courage, selflessness and skill in defending the Fatherland. The law on the Order of the Combat Cross has been in effect since April 22, 1994. The Battle Cross is worn on the left side of the chest, after the Order of the Fatherland. The family of a deceased person awarded the "Battle Cross" Order benefits from the privileges established by the legislation of the National Assembly of Armenia.

== Degrees ==
There are two degrees to the Order of the Combat Cross.

Order of Combat Cross
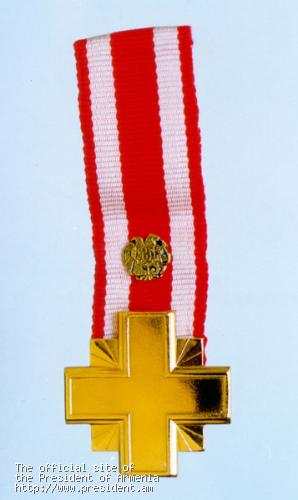
Order of Combat Cross of the First Degree (Medal)

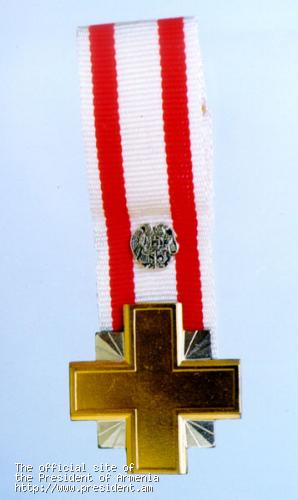
Order of Combat Cross of the Second Degree (Medal)

Order of Combat Cross of the First Degree (Ribbon)

Order of Combat Cross of the Second Degree (Ribbon)

=== 1st Degree ===
- Military personnel of the Republic of Armenia for absolute bravery and personal courage in defending the Fatherland, as well as other people for significant contribution to the defense of the country.
- Senior military commanders of the Republic of Armenia for significant success during military action.

=== 2nd Degree ===
- The military personnel and senior commanders of the Republic of Armenia for skillfully carrying out their military orders, as well as to other people for significant contribution the carrying out of military orders.
- Employees of Ministries of Internal Affairs, National Security and the Customs Service, as well as other people for personal courage in preservation of public order.

== Recipients ==
- Seyran Ohanyan
- Arkady Ter-Tadevosyan
- Nikolai Patrushev
- Gurgen Dalibaltayan
- Jirair Sefilian
- Leonard Petrosyan
- Norat Ter-Grigoryants
- Movses Hakobyan
- Yuri Khatchaturov
- Albert Bazeyan
- Kristapor Ivanyan
- Kyaram Sloyan
- Vitaly Balasanyan
- Levon Mnatsakanyan
- Hrachya Andreasyan

== See also ==
- Orders, decorations, and medals of Armenia
