= Skyrocket Light Project =

Syrian campaign against sexual violence

- Website: http://zaatarilights.tumblr.com/

The Skyrocket Light Project was created to bring attention to sexual violence against Syrian women. At the 'Al Zaatari Refugee Camp', solar-powered LED lights were placed near bathrooms and supplemental school supplies were provided to support the camp's student population. It was crowdfunded on Rockethub by Max Holland and Ben Decker in November 2013, and lights were installed beginning in January 2014.

== Background, fundraising and implementation ==
=== Background and fundraising ===
The project development came in the face of the Syrian Civil War, which has displaced over two million people since 2011. The Zaatari refugee camp in neighboring Jordan holds ~80,000–150,000 individuals, many of whom are women and children. Trauma centers and washrooms in the camp do not have electricity and are unsafe areas for women at night. Holland and Drecker collaborated via e-mail to create a philanthropic effort helping displaced Syrians, deciding to focus on women and students through lights and school supplies. Crowdfunding on RocketHub commenced in November 2013 and ended on December 1 with 104 funders raising over $4,000.

=== Implementation ===
Holland and Decker began working with Elliot Talbert-Goldstein, and they met with NGO officials to discuss implementation. International Rescue Committee, United Nations High Commissioner for Refugees, OXFAM, Save the Children, and International Relief and Development Inc. collaborated on the installation of solar lights. Lights were installed in January 2014 in three community tents, 42 "Child-Friendly Spaces" run by Save the Children, and a children's library run by the IRD. As of February, no lights have been broken or stolen.

== News coverage ==
Decker and Holland authored an article for EAWorldView, regarding their experiences in the camp.

The Atlantic Post wrote an article describing the project, in a piece written by Justin Salhani.

Jadaliyya included the Skyrocket Light Project in a Media Roundup, on January 3.
