= Artashavan =

Village in Aragatsotn, Armenia

Artashavan Արտաշավան
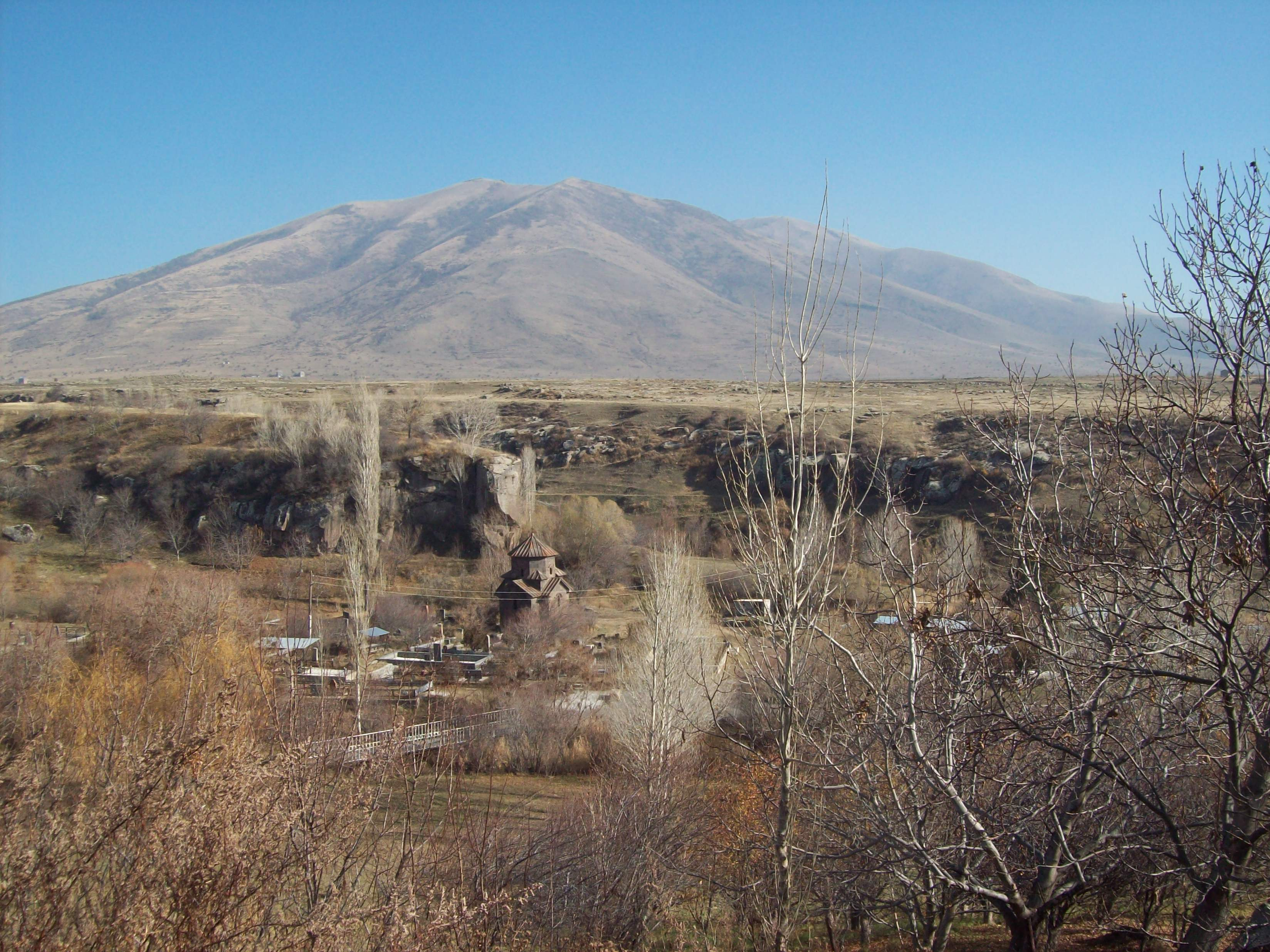
- S. Amenaprkich Church (7th c.) in Artashavan

- Location within Armenia Location within Aragatsotn
- Coordinates: 40°23′37″N 44°22′53″E
- Country: Armenia
- Province: Aragatsotn
- Municipality: Ashtarak
- Elevation: 1,630 m (5,350 ft)

Population (2011)
  - Total: 589
- Time zone: UTC+4
  - Summer (DST): UTC+5

Artashavan (Armenian: Արտաշավան) is a village in the Ashtarak Municipality of the Aragatsotn Province of Armenia. In the village to the northeast, is the restored 7th-century Surp Amenaprkich Church. The villages of Lusaghbyur and Nigatun are also within the community of Artashavan.

== Gallery ==
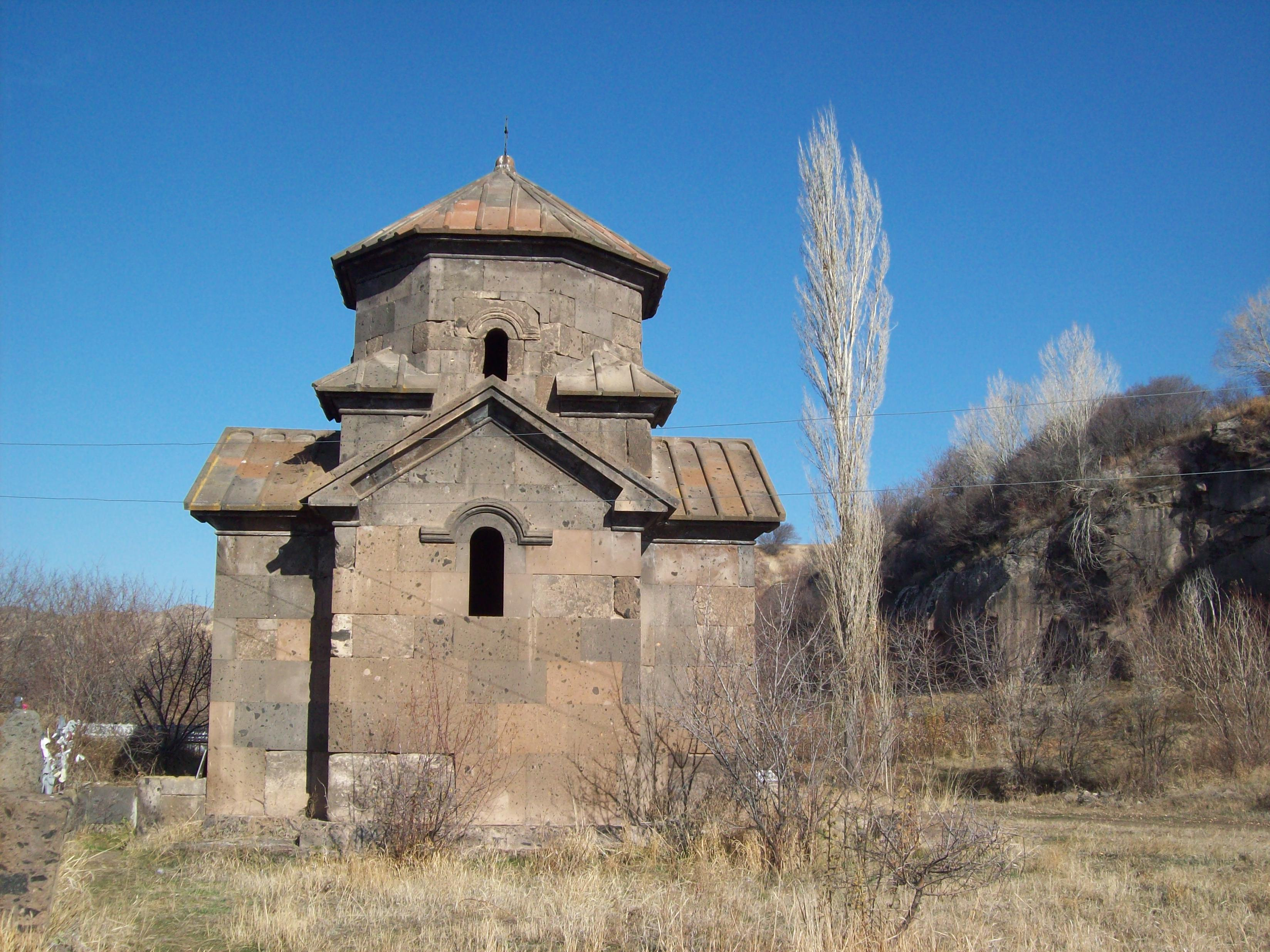
S. Amenaprkich Church

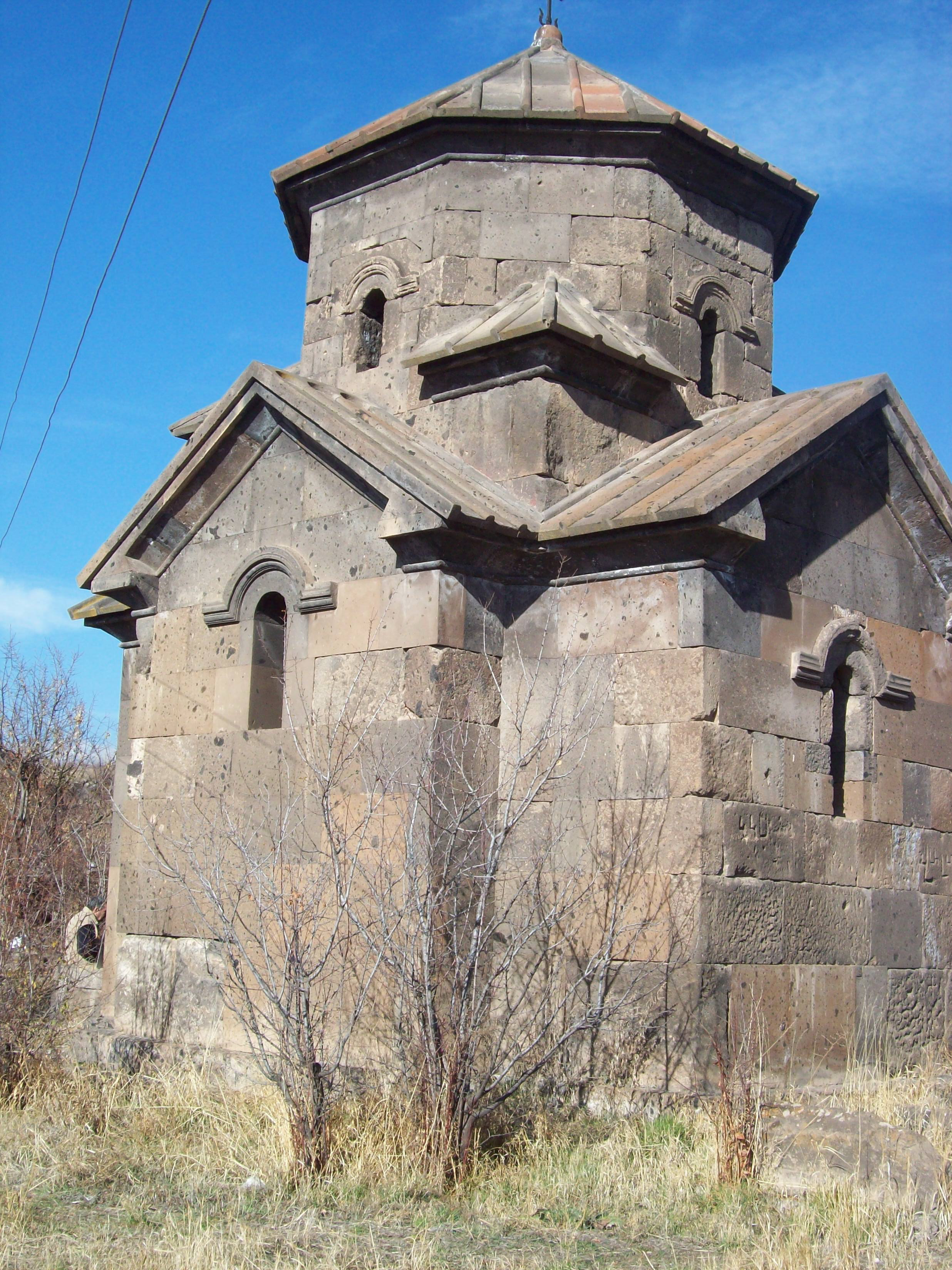
S. Amenaprkich Church

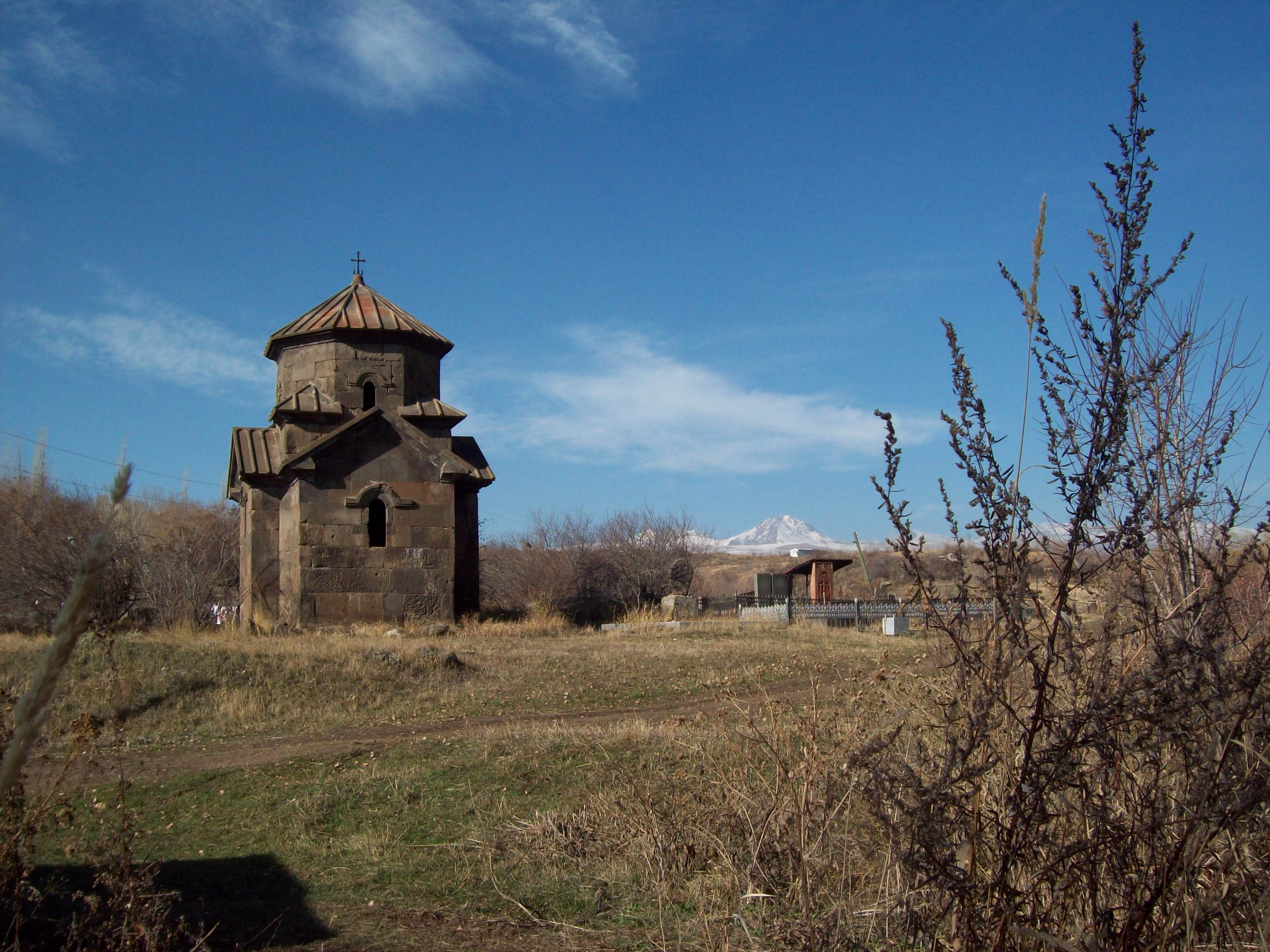
S. Amenaprkich Church

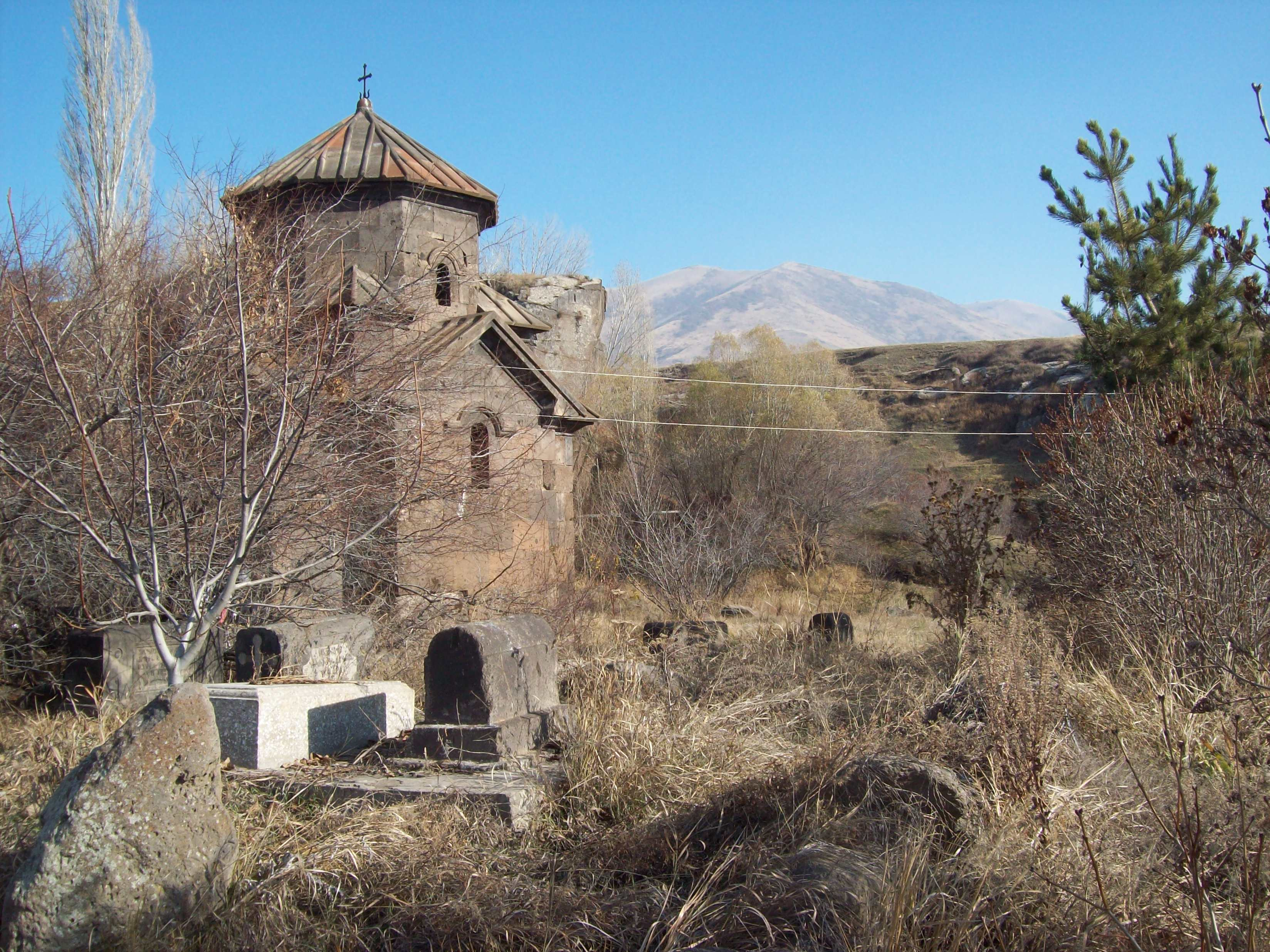
S. Amenaprkich Church

== Notable people ==
- Kyaram Sloyan
