= Sergey Ambartsumian =

Sergey Ambartsumian OL OOR OTG OF ORBL OBH
- Սերգեյ Համբարձումյան
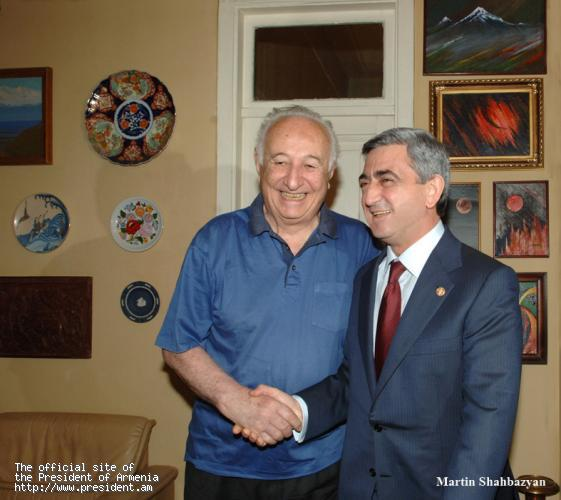
- Ambartsumian with Serzh Sargsyan on 30 April 2008
- Born: 17 March 1922; Gyumri, Armenia SSR, Transcaucasian SFSR
- Died: 4 August 2018 (aged 96); Yerevan, Armenia
- Education: National Polytechnic University of Armenia
- Scientific career
- Fields: Mechanics
- Workplaces: Armenian National Academy of Sciences; Yerevan State University

Sergey Aleksandrovich Ambartsumian (Armenian: Սերգեյ Համբարձումյան; 17 March 1922 – 4 August 2018), was a Soviet and Armenian scientist in the field of mechanics, academic and politician, Honored Scientist of the Armenian SSR in 1985.

== Biography and career ==
Sergey Aleksandrovich Ambartsumian was born on 17 March 1922 in the Soviet city of Alexandropol (Gyumri). In 1938 he graduated from secondary school in Yerevan and in 1942 from the Faculty of Construction Mechanics of the Yerevan Polytechnic Institute, where he taught between 1943 and 1948. In 1946 he defended the tesis for Candidate of Sciences and became Doktor nauk in 1952. Between 1946 and 1955 he was the Senior Researcher, Head of Sector, deputy director of the Institute of Building Materials and Structures of the Armenian SSR Academy of Sciences.

In 1953 he received the title of professor, becoming member of the Academy of Sciences of the Armenian SSR in 1956. Between 1959 and 1970 he was Director of the Institute of Mathematics and Mechanics of the Armenian SSR Academy of Sciences. He was also deputy Chairman of the State Prize Committee since 1970 to 1992.

In 1977 he was elected rector of Yerevan State University, office he held until 1991.

As a politician, he was member of the Supreme Soviet of Armenian SSR at IX convocation (1975–1980) and of the Supreme Soviet of the Soviet Union between 1979 and 1984 at the X convocation.

== Membership ==
- Member of the International Academy of Astronautics.
- Academician of the International Engineering Academy.
- Honorary member of the Philosophical Academy of Armenia.
- Member of the International Academy of Sciences of Education of Industry and Art.
- Professor of the Institute of Informatics and Business of Penninsulaia.
- Honorary Doctor of Bratislava University.
- Honorary Professor of Yerevan Architectural and Construction University.
- Member of the American Society of Mechanics.
- Member of the Russian National Committee for Theoretical and Applied Mechanics.
- Honorary member of the Society of Mechanics of the Slovak Academy of Sciences.
- Member of the Society of Mechanics of Armenia.

== Awards ==
- Order of Tigran the Great (2012)
- Order of Friendship (2007).
- Order of Lenin (1981).
- Order of the October Revolution (1986).
- Order of the Red Banner of Labour (1976).
- Order of the Badge of Honour (1971).
- Medal "For Labor Valor" (1955).
- Honored Scientist of the Armenian SSR (1985).
- Order of the Armenian Apostolic Church "Saints Saak and Mesrop."
- Medal of SI Vavilov.
- Medal of Jan Amos of Comenius (1984).
- Medal "Fighter for Peace" of the Soviet Union for the Protection of Peace.
- Gold medal of Yerevan State University.
- Gold Medal of the University of Montpellier (1986).
- The Big Gold Medal of the International Engineering Academy.
- The big silver medal is the International Engineering Academy.
- Honorary citizen of Yerevan (2012).
- Honorary citizen of Gyumri.
- Honorary Citizen of Montpellier (1986).
