= University of Aleppo =

Public university in Syria

Coordinates: 36°12′40″N 37°07′06″E

- جَامِعَة حَلَب
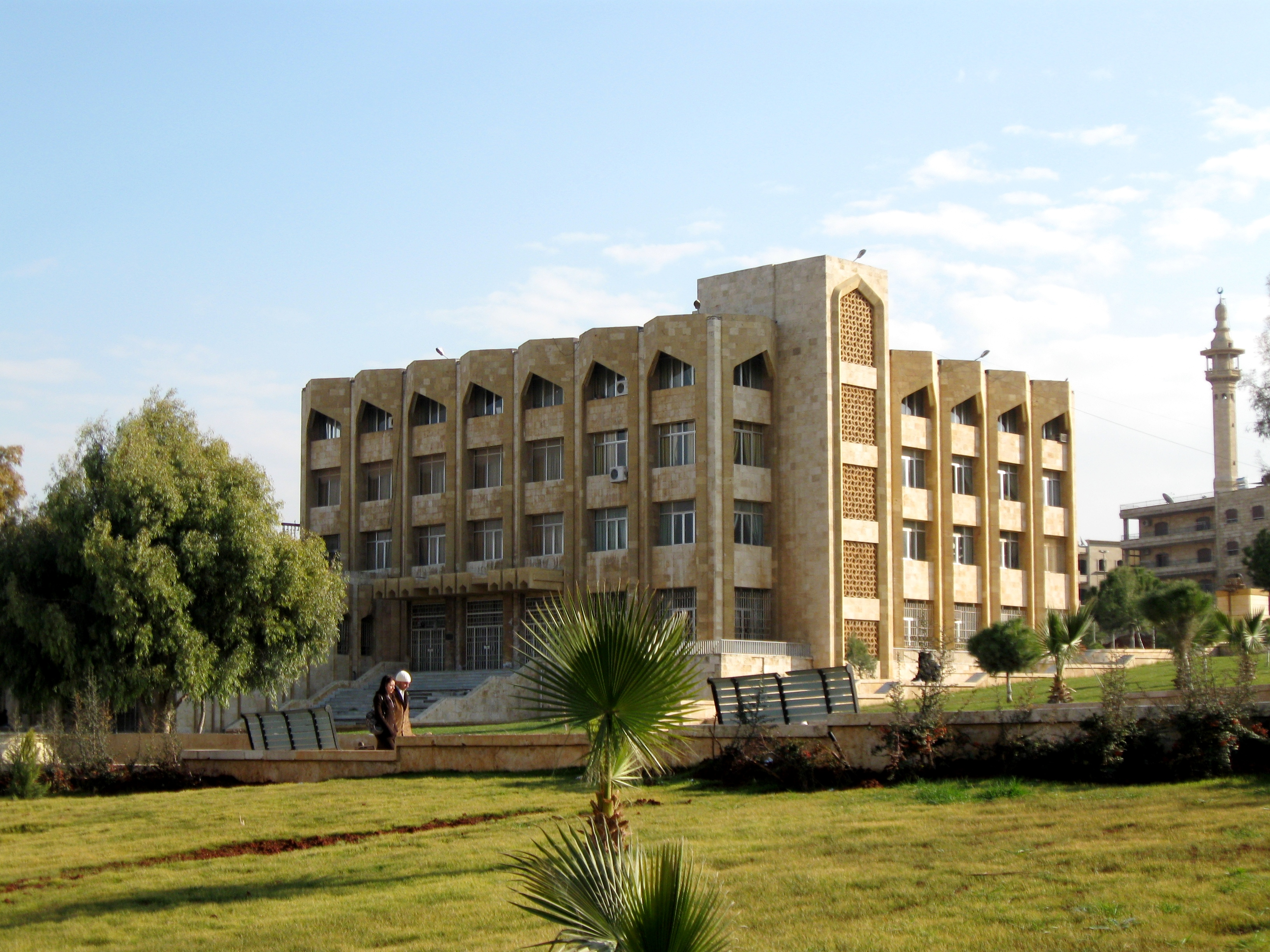
- Type: Public
- Established: 1958
- Academic affiliations: UNAI; UNIMED
- Rector: Dr. Mohammed Osama Raadon
- Undergraduates: 55,732
- Postgraduates: 4,386
- Doctoral students: 1,525
- Location: Aleppo, Syria
- Campus: Urban
- Website: alepuniv.edu.sy

University of Aleppo (Arabic: جَامِعَة حَلَب, romanized: Jāmiʿat Ḥalab, also called Aleppo University) is a public university located in Aleppo, Syria. It is the second largest university in Syria after the Damascus University.

During 2005–06, the university had over 61,000 undergraduate students, over 1,500 post graduate students and approximately 2,400 faculty members. The university has 25 faculties and 10 intermediate colleges.

Two branches of University of Aleppo were opened in 2015, in Azaz and Mare' by the Syrian opposition. They were integrated into the University in 2025.

== History ==
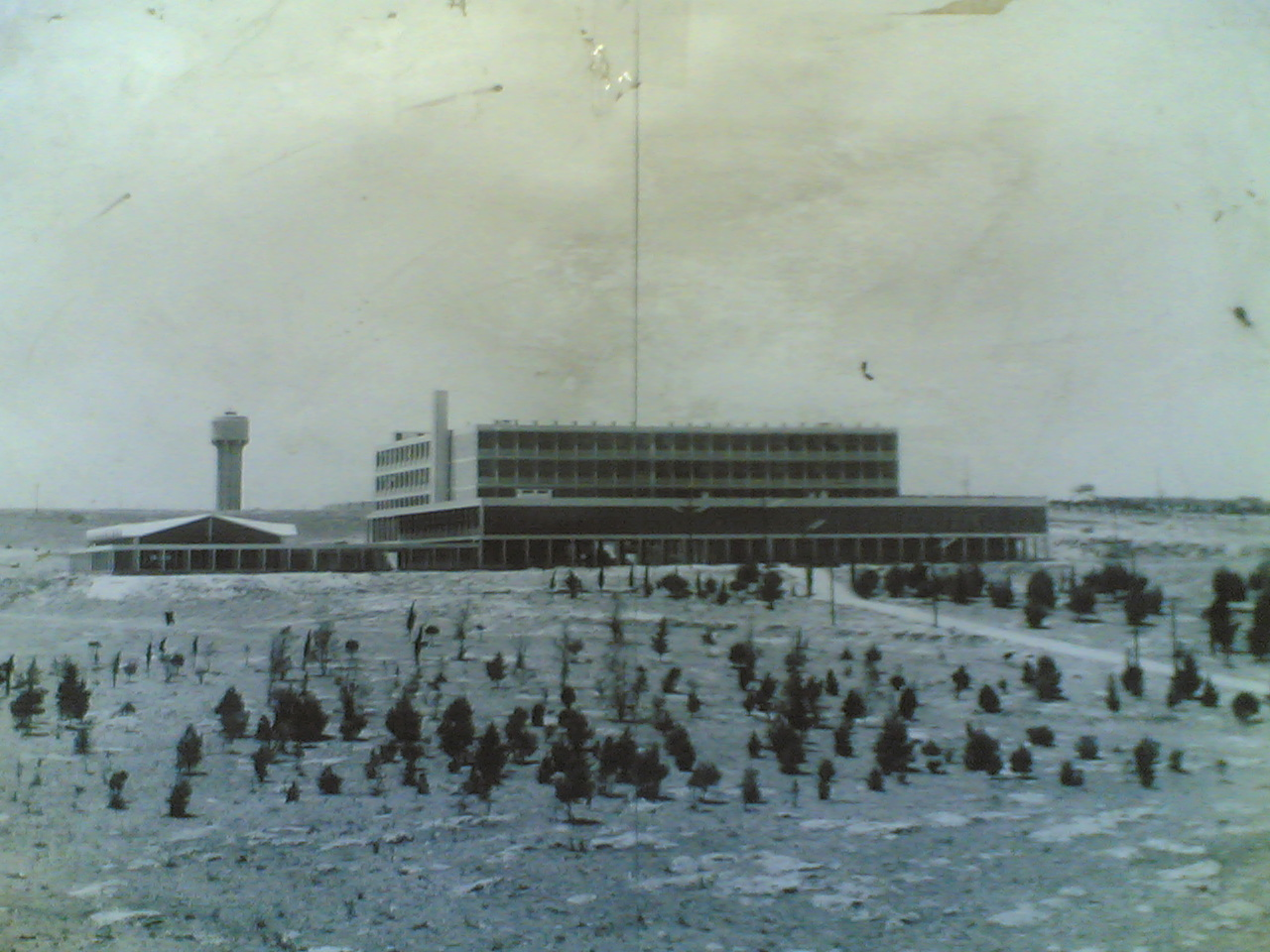
The university during the 1960s

What was to become the University of Aleppo consisted of a Faculty of Engineering in Aleppo opened in 1946 and affiliated to what is now the University of Damascus (Syrian University at that time). After the end of French rule in 1946, the newly independent Syria only had one university.

In 1958, the Syrian government passed a law that created the University of Aleppo as the second university in the country. When the new university opened its doors in 1960, it consisted of two faculties (Civil Engineering and Agriculture). The university grew rapidly in the subsequent decades, formed respected programmes in engineering, sciences, and literature, as well as a strong emphasis on languages, offering courses on German, Russian, French, and English.

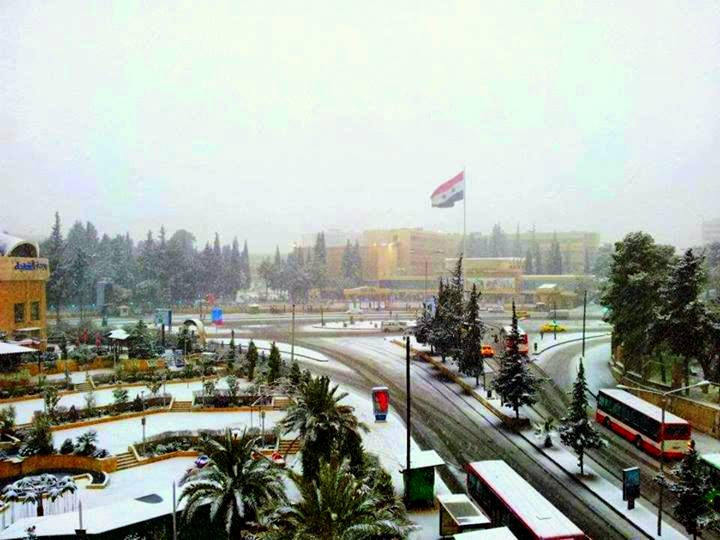
The main entrance to the University of Aleppo

The university is member of the EuroMed Permanent University Forum (EPUF), the Mediterranean Universities Union (UNIMED) and the Regional Corporation Confremo. During 2008, the University of Aleppo marked its golden jubilee.

On 15 January 2013, 82 people were killed during the Aleppo University bombings. The blasts reportedly struck an area between Aleppo University's halls of residence and the architecture faculty. The initial death toll was 52, but Aleppo's governor later revised the number.

On 29 November 2024, a shelling attack in the student dormitories killed four people, including two students.

On 27 December 2024, Idlib University was officially separated from University of Aleppo, and Idlib Section of UOA was subsequently abolished.

== Structure ==
=== Hospitals ===
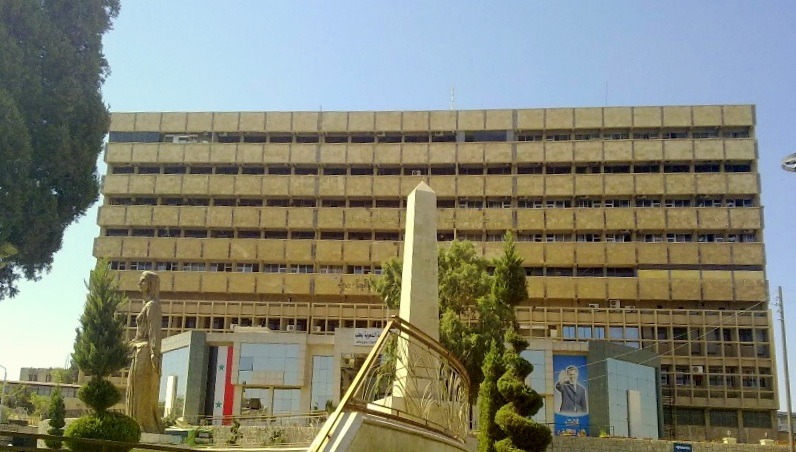
Aleppo University Cardiovascular Surgical Centre

The university runs six hospitals in the city of Aleppo:

- Aleppo University Hospital (AUH)
- Aleppo University Cardiovascular Surgical Centre
- OB/GYN Hospital
- Oral and Maxillofacial Surgical Centre (Inside Faculty Of Dentistry)
- Nursing School Hospital (Affiliated with Faculty of Medicine)
- Al-Kindi Hospital (currently not operating)

=== Other structures ===
The university is home to one of the biggest libraries (Central Library of the University) in Syria with more than 1.5 million units. In addition, there are 17 academic centres, a publishing and printing house, and 20 units in the campus, designated to host more than 12 thousand students.

The university publishes its scientific journal periodically which is called Aleppo University Researches.

On 7 February 2010, the university announced the opening of its Radio & TV Centre, which is the first of its type among Syrian universities and the third in the Middle East.

== Presidents ==
- Dr. Tawfik Al-Munajed (1960–68)
- Dr. Mustafa Ezzat Al-Nassar (1968–69)
- Dr. Shaker Fahham (1969-73)
- Dr. Ahmad Y. al-Hassan (1973–79)
- Dr. Mohammad Ali Hourieh (1979–2000)
- Dr. Mohammad Saeed Farhoud (2001–04)
- Dr. Mohammad Nizar Akil (2004–10)
- Dr. Nidal Shehadeh (2010-2012)
- Dr. Abed Yakan (2012)
- Dr. Kheder Ourfali (2012)
- Dr. Mahmoud Dahhan (2013–14)
- Dr. Mustafa Afiouni (2015–2020)
- Dr. Maher Karman (2020-2024)
- Dr. Mohammed Osama Raadon (2024-present)

== Notable alumni ==
- Wajih Azaizeh, Jordanian politician
- Mohammad Nidal al-Shaar, Syrian politician and economist
- Muhammad bin Jamil Zeno, Islamic scholar
- Zuhair Masharqa, Syrian politician
- Sufian Allaw, Syrian politician
- Heba Haj Aref, Syrian human rights activist
- Ibtisam Ibrahim Teresa, award-winning Syrian novelist
- Khaled Khalifa, award-winning Syrian novelist
- Abdulrazak Eid, Syrian writer and thinker
- Muhammed Abu Maatouk, Syrian playwright
- Darin Ahmad, Syrian artist, poet and writer
- Fathallah Omar, writer
- Muhamad Aly Rifai, Syrian American internist and psychiatrist
- Mazloum Abdi, Syrian Kurdish PKK and SDF commander
- Waad Al-Kateab Academy Award nominated film director of For Sama (2019)
- Kenan Yaghi, former Finance Minister of Syria
- Mohammad al-Bashir, former Prime Minister of Syria
- Hrayr Hovakimyan, cardiac surgeon, National Hero of Armenia
