= Aleppo University bombings =

2013 civilian attack

- Part of the Syrian Civil War
- Location: Aleppo, Syria
- Date: 15 January 2013 (UTC+3)
- Attack type: School bombing
- Weapon: Missiles
- Deaths: 87
- Injuries: 160

The Aleppo University bombings took place on 15 January 2013, during the Syrian Civil War. The bombings killed at least 87 people at the Aleppo University, including students and children. The explosions reportedly struck an area between the University of Aleppo's halls of residence and the faculty of architecture, on the first day of exams. Both sides blamed each other for the explosions. While the university has been a center of antigovernment demonstrations, it is also in a government-held area, with neither side seemingly having had an obvious reason to strike. It was also a refuge for over 30,000 civilians fleeing the fighting in Aleppo.

Syrian officials and media claimed rebels had launched two rockets at the campus from al-Lairamoun area, adding that similar rockets fired from there also hit the Bani Zaid area the same day. Aleppo's governor Mohammed Wahid Akkad called the rocket strikes a "terrorist attack that targeted students on their first day of exams."

The United States blamed airstrikes by government forces for the deaths, and condemned the "despicable attack". The opposition accounts claimed that warplanes had targeted the university in two separate missile attacks three minutes apart, they claim that it is backed by "statements of eyewitnesses and video footage". On 24 January, amateur video footage of a second explosion was released where the roar of over-flying jet, after missile hit, can be heard. Unnamed experts quoted by EA Worldview identified the missile as air-to-ground, as opposed to ballistic missile that Syrian government claimed to hit the university.

CNN claims that most university students blamed the attack on the Syrian government, one student said that the explosions were more accidental. The student said that insurgent fighters just outside Aleppo who apparently were armed with a heat-seeking missile fired it at a MIG fighter, and that the pilot dropped a heat balloon as an evasive tactic, and that the missile followed the balloon and then exploded adjacent to the university dormitories. Other students also reported seeing what they described as heat balloons before the explosions. This does not however explain the second explosion.

The government-affiliated National Union of Syrian Students condemned the terrorist attack on Aleppo University. It said that "armed terrorist groups started to target universities after targeting the infrastructure of the national economy, the public and private institutions, factories, facilities, bakeries and the research centers". The union expressed pride in "the sacrifices of the Syrian Arab Army, wishing mercy upon the martyrs of Syria and the University of Aleppo".

Minister of Higher Education Mohammad Yahya Mu'ala said that President Bashar al-Assad gave his instructions to rehabilitate what has been destroyed in Aleppo University as soon as possible to ensure the process of the education and exams at the university, and rehabilitate all universities and institutions affected and damaged at the hands of "terrorism which targets Syria and its people".
