= Order of Glory (Armenia) =

Order of Glory Armenian: Պատվո Շքանշան
- Order of Glory
- Type: Order of chivalry
- Awarded for: Significant contributions to strengthening international relations, peacebuilding, and cooperation with the Republic of Armenia
- Presented by: President of Armenia
- Eligibility: Armenian citizens, foreign citizens and stateless persons
- Status: Active
- Established: December 22, 2010
- Service ribbon

Precedence
- Next (higher): National Hero of Armenia
- Next (lower): Order of Tigran the Great

The Order of Glory is a state Award of the Republic of Armenia, was created and signed by the President of the Republic of Armenia on January 11, 2011. With the "Bord of Honor" law, which came into force on January 29 (the law expired on August 9, 2014). According to the Law of the Republic of Armenia "On State Awards and Honorary Titles of the Republic of Armenia", which came into force on the same day, August 9. As a result of changes in legislation, the status of the medal, the list of awardees and the order of wearing it remained unchanged.

== Award status ==
The Order of Glory is awarded for significant contributions to the strengthening and development of interstate relations, peace and international security, the protection of human rights and fundamental freedoms, the development of economic relations, and the protection of moral and cultural values.

According to paragraph 16 of Article 55 of the Constitution of Armenia, the medal is awarded by the President of the Republic of Armenia. The President issues an order regarding the reward.

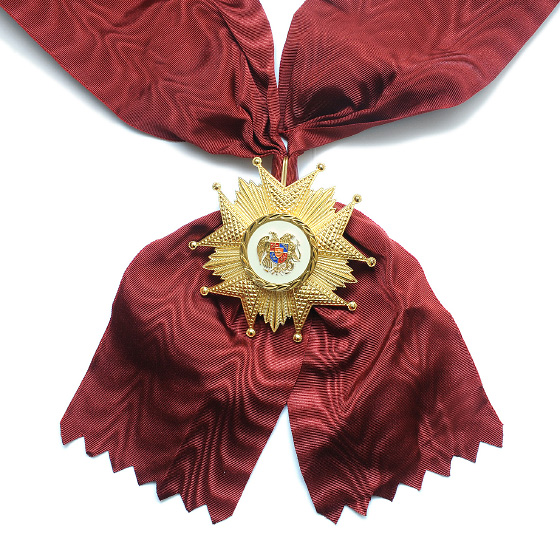
AR Order of Glory

== Determined reward method ==
Foreign heads of state and government, heads of international organizations, spiritual leaders (religious figures) are awarded with this decoration.

According to the law adopted in 2011, there was no established procedure for awarding the Order of Glory.

As of August 9, 2014, the President will be able to award medals both on his personal initiative and in line with the petitions of the authorities regarding the award. Decree of the President of the Republic of Armenia dated September 16, 2014 No. NH-396-N "On Regulation of Relations with State Awards and Titles of Honor of the Republic of Armenia", the exclusive right of the Prime Minister of the Republic of Armenia to apply for the Order of Glory of the Republic of Armenia.

== Dressing procedure ==
The Medal of Honor is worn from right to left on a ribbon that extends from the right shoulder to the left hip.

== Description of the medal ==
Description and sample of the medal, sample of the certificate, description and sample of the medal plaque are approved by the President of the Republic of Armenia.

The definition of the Order of Honor of the President of the Republic of Armenia as determined by the decree dated September 16. The medal of honor is made of 925 sterling silver alloy with a diameter of 97 mm. It is a convex isosceles pentagon and all its rays are convex towards the center. The wings of the five-pointed star are covered with small pyramidal elements, and in the space between them there are ray-shaped figures. In the center of the medal is a circular platform covered with a tricolor coat of arms depicting the coat of arms of the Republic of Armenia. The edges of the coat of arms are surrounded by laurel leaves, and the area between the coat of arms and the laurel wreath is covered with white enamel. The medal is plated with 999 gold. The medal is numbered on the back. There is a special fastener in the middle of the back of the medal to attach it to the ribbon. The band is dark red, width: 110 mm. The bar of the medal is made of sheet metal measuring 25 mm x 10 mm. The rod is dark red, a rectangular base with an eight-pointed star is fixed in the center.

== Reward statistics ==
- 2011: 2,
- No medals were awarded in 2012 and 2013
- 2014: 2.

== List of recipients ==
- Dmitry Medvedev, President of Russia (October 4, 2011)
- Nicolas Sarkozy, President of France (5 October 2011)
- François Hollande, President of France (May 12, 2014)
- Tomislav Nikolic, President of Serbia (October 11, 2014)
- Matthew Festing, Prince and Grand Master of the Sovereign Military Order of Malta (24 October 2016)
- Sergio Mattarella, President of Italy (July 30, 2018)
- Konstantinos Tasoulas, President of Greece (13 February 2026)
- Emmanuel Macron, President of France (4 May 2026)

== See also ==
- Orders, decorations, and medals of Armenia
