= Kasakh =

Kasakh Քասախ
- Location within Armenia
- Coordinates: 40°14′03″N 44°27′09″E
- Country: Armenia
- Province: Kotayk
- Municipality: Nairi
- Elevation: 1,175 m (3,855 ft)

Population (2011)
  - Total: 5,186

Kasakh (Armenian: Քասախ) is a village in the Kotayk Province of Armenia.

== Notable people ==
- Vahagn Asatryan, National Hero of Armenia
- Hripsime Khurshudyan, European champion in weightlifting
