= Vahagn Asatryan =

Armenian military figure (1977–2020)

National Hero of Armenia Vahagn Asatryan Վահագն Ասատրյան Colonel
- Վահագն Ասատրյան
- Born: January 14, 1977; Kasagh, Armenian SSR, Soviet Union
- Died: October 12, 2020 (aged 43); Hadrut Province, Republic of Artsakh
- Burial place: Yerablur Military Pantheon
- Military career
- Allegiance: Armenia; Artsakh
- Service: Armed Forces of Armenia
- Rank: Colonel
- Commands: N Military Unit of Special Operations
- Conflicts: First Nagorno-Karabakh War; Second Nagorno-Karabakh War; Battle of Hadrut †
- Awards: National Hero of Armenia

Signature
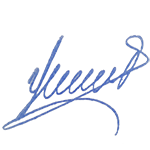

Vahagn Felixi Asatryan (Armenian: Վահագն Ֆելիքսի Ասատրյան; 14 January 1977 – 12 October 2020) was an Armenian military leader, Colonel of the Armed Forces of Armenia, and National Hero of Armenia.

== Biography ==
=== Military service ===
==== Second Nagorno-Karabakh War ====
Vahagn Asatryan took part in the armed conflict in Nagorno-Karabakh, where he was killed in action at the Battle of Hadrut. He was posthumously awarded the title of National Hero of Armenia for his distinction in military activity.

==== Funeral ====
On 15 October 2020, Asatryan was buried in the Yerablur Military Pantheon.

== Awards and honors ==
On October 15, 2020, the Prime Minister of Armenia Nikol Pashinyan submitted a petition to the President of the Republic to posthumously confer the title of National Hero to Colonel Vahagn Asatryan. On the same day, by the decree of the President of Armenia Armen Sarkissian, Vahagn Asatryan was posthumously awarded the Order of the Fatherland for outstanding services in the defense and security of the Motherland, dedication during hostilities and was awarded the title of National Hero of Armenia.

== Personal life ==
He was married and raised two sons.
