= Scott Lucas =

Scott Lucas is the name of:

- Scott W. Lucas (1892–1968), U.S. Senator and Senate Majority Leader from Illinois
- Scott Lucas (footballer) (born 1977), Australian footballer
- Scott Lucas (musician) (born 1970), founding member of Local H
- Professor Scott Lucas, Ireland-based political science scholar and editor of EA WorldView
