= Prishib =

Prishib (Russian: Пришиб) is the name of several rural localities in Russia.

Modern localities

- Prishib, Astrakhan Oblast, a selo in Prishibinsky Selsoviet of Yenotayevsky District in Astrakhan Oblast; 47°41′N 46°28′E
- Prishib, Republic of Bashkortostan, a selo in Alexeyevsky Selsoviet of Blagovarsky District in the Republic of Bashkortostan
- Prishib, Omsk Oblast, a selo in Prishibsky Rural Okrug of Azovsky Nemetsky National District in Omsk Oblast
- Prishib, Rostov Oblast, a khutor in Voznesenskoye Rural Settlement of Morozovsky District in Rostov Oblast
- Prishib, Voronezh Oblast, a selo in Krasnobratskoye Rural Settlement of Kalacheyevsky District in Voronezh Oblast

Renamed localities

- Prishib, name of Leninsk, a town in Leninsky District of Volgograd Oblast, until 1919
