= Hripsime Khurshudyan =

Armenian weightlifter (born 1987)

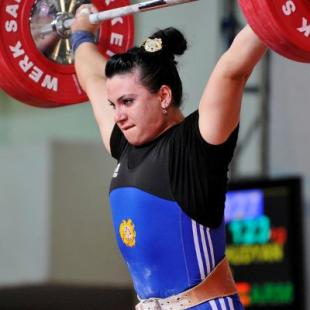

Personal information
- Born: 27 July 1987 (age 38) Kasakh, Armenia
- Height: 1.73 m (5 ft 8 in)
- Weight: 88 kg (194 lb)

Sport
- Country: Armenia
- Sport: Weightlifting
- Event: +75 kg
Medal record
Women's weightlifting
Representing Armenia
Olympic Games
| Disqualified | London 2012 | +75 kg |
World Weightlifting Championships
| Disqualified | 2009 Goyang | 75 kg |
European Weightlifting Championships
| Gold medal – first place | 2007 Strasbourg | 75 kg |
| Silver medal – second place | 2006 Władysławowo | 75 kg |
| Bronze medal – third place | 2023 Yerevan | 87 kg |
| Bronze medal – third place | 2024 Sofia | 87 kg |
| Disqualified | 2009 Bucharest | 75 kg |
| Disqualified | 2011 Kazan | +75 kg |
| Disqualified | 2010 Minsk | 75 kg |
| Disqualified | 2016 Førde | +75 kg |

Hripsime Khurshudyan (Armenian: Հռիփսիմե Խուրշուդյան, born July 27, 1987, in Kasakh, Armenian SSR) is an Armenian weightlifter.

== Early life ==
Hripsime was born in the village Kasakh in the Nairi region of Armenian SSR.

She has been training in weightlifting since she was 15 under the honored coach of Armenia, Sarmen Yesayan.

== Career ==
Khurshudyan won a silver medal at the 2006 European Weightlifting Championships. She became the first woman weightlifter from the independent Republic of Armenia to win a medal at the European Weightlifting Championships. The following year, she and Meline Daluzyan became the first Armenian female weightlifters to become European Champions at the 2007 European Weightlifting Championships. Khurshudyan also became a Junior World Champion in 2007.

Khurshudyan competed at the 2008 Summer Olympics in the 75 kg weight class, finishing in 11th place. She was a late substitute for Meline Daluzyan, who suffered from an acute attack of pancreatitis and was forced to withdraw from the Olympics. Since she was not prepared to take part in this competition, Khurshudyan could not perform to the best of her ability.

In 2010, Khurshudyan was unable to fit within the weight category of 75 kg and was forced to move up in weight class.

She participated in the women's +75 kg weight class at the 2012 Olympic Games in London, though weighing in at only 76 kg. She originally won the bronze medal, finishing behind Tatiana Kashirina and Zhou Lulu. She snatched 128 kg and jerked an additional 166 kg for a total of 294 kg. Khurshudyan originally became not only the first Armenian woman to win an Olympic medal in weightlifting, but also the first Armenian woman to win an Olympic medal.

In 2016, the International Weightlifting Federation (IWF) revealed that she was one of 11 weightlifters who failed a doping test. Actual retests of her samples from 2008 revealed the presence of stanozolol, and she was officially disqualified. Actual retests of her samples from 2012 revealed the presence of dehydrochlormethyltestosterone and stanozolol. In November 2016, she was stripped of the Olympic medal.

== Personal life ==
Following the 2012 Olympics, Khurshudyan got married and took some time off from the sport of weightlifting.
