= Hrayr Hovakimyan =

Armenian doctor and cardiac surgeon

National Hero of Armenia Hrayr Hovakimyan
- Հրայր Հովակիմյան
- Born: Hakob Sahak Hovakimyan (Հակոբ Սահակի Հովակիմյան)
- Education: University of Aleppo
- Occupation: Surgeon
- Awards: National Hero of Armenia; Order of St. Mesrop Mashtots

Hakob Sahak Hovakimyan (Armenian: Հակոբ Սահակի Հովակիմյան), better known as Hrayr Hovakimyan (Armenian: Հրայր Հովակիմյան), is an Armenian doctor and cardiac surgeon who was awarded the title of National Hero of Armenia.

== Biography ==
Hovakimyan graduated from the Medical Faculty at the University of Aleppo in 1977, then spent several years training in the United States. He worked at Beckman University in New York from 1977 to 1984; Providence St. Vincent Medical Center in Oregon (cardiopulmonary surgery direction) from 1984 to 1988; and at the Children's Hospital of Philadelphia from 1988 to 1989.

In 1990, Hovakimyan participated in the creation of the Biotronic EDP-30 pulse generator. Between 1992 and 1993, he worked at Yerevan's Mickaelyan Institute of Surgery, then founded the Department of Pediatric Cardiac Surgery at the Nork-Marash Medical Center. In 1996, a department of cardiac surgery for adults was also opened. He has been Chief Cardiac Surgeon of the Nork-Marash Medical Center and throughout his career has trained a large number of Armenian doctors in the field of cardiac surgery.

== Awards and honours ==
- Honorary Citizen of Yerevan (1997)
- Honorary Doctor of the National Academy of Sciences of Armenia (1999)
- Member of associations of a number of foreign medical companies
- 1st Place in Respiratory Surgery, Oregon Medical University
- Order of St. Mesrop Mashtots (2008)
- Medal of the II degree "For Services to the Fatherland" (Armenia) (2014)
- The title of the National Hero of Armenia, awarded the Order of Fatherland (2020) - for many years of selfless work to save many lives
