= Muhammed Abu Maatouk =

Syrian playwright

Muhammed Abu Maatouk (Arabic: محمد أبو معتوق; born 1950) is a Syrian playwright, screenwriter and novelist. He was born in Aleppo, and studied Arabic at Aleppo University. He has written numerous plays, novels, short stories and screenplays. His first novel The Tree of Speech was published in 1990, while The Bottle and the Genie (2008) was longlisted for the Arabic Booker Prize in 2009.

Abu Maatouk wrote the screenplay of Abu Zayd al-Hilali, an epic TV series based on the life of the 11th-century Arab leader which was first shown on Abu Dhabi TV in 2004.
