= Order of Saint Vardan Mamikonian =

State order of Armenia

Order of St. Vardan Mamikonian Armenian: Սուրբ Վարդան Մամիկոնյանի շքանշան
- The Order St. Vardan Mamikonian
- Type: Military order
- Awarded for: Exceptional courage while fulfilling military duty to the motherland; outstanding services in army building; ensuring military combat training; increasing combat readiness of the armed forces
- Country: Armenia
- Presented by: President of Armenia
- Eligibility: Senior and top military officers of the Armenian Armed Forces and other Forces
- Status: Active
- Established: June 12, 2002
- First award: April 9, 2008

Highlights
- Total: 18
- Service ribbon

Precedence
- Next (higher): Order of the Combat Cross
- Next (lower): Order of St. Mesrop Mashtots

Order of Saint Vardan Mamikonian (known as the Order of Vardan Mamikonian between 2002 and 2014) is a state award of the Republic of Armenia. It was established by the law "On the Order of Vardan Mamikonian," adopted by the National Assembly on May 20, 2002, signed by the President on June 12, 2002, and came into force on June 26, 2002.

== Status ==
The Order is awarded for exceptional courage in the performance of military duty to the homeland, as well as for outstanding services in army building and ensuring combat readiness of the troops.

According to Article 55, paragraph 16 of the Constitution of Armenia, the Order is conferred by the President of the Republic of Armenia. The President issues a decree on each awarding.

== Recipients ==
=== 2002–2006 ===
According to the original 2002 law, the Order was awarded to senior and high-ranking officers of the Armed Forces of the Republic of Armenia and other military units.

=== 2006–2014 ===
On May 2, 2006, the law was amended to allow awarding the Order also to military units of the Armed Forces and other troops.

=== Current status ===
Since the law effective August 9, 2014, the Order of Saint Vardan Mamikonian is awarded to senior and high-ranking officers of the Armenian Armed Forces and other troops, as well as to military units of the Armenian Armed Forces and of allied or partner states.

== Nomination procedure ==
=== 2002–2014 ===
Between 2002 and 2014, nomination requests for awarding the Order were submitted by the Government of Armenia, the Ministry of Defense, the Police, and the National Security Service.

=== Current procedure ===
According to the President's Decree No. NH-396-N dated September 16, 2014, the right to submit nomination requests for the Order belongs to the Ministers of Defense, Emergency Situations, Justice, the Chief of Police, and the Director of the National Security Service.

== Wearing ==
The Order of Saint Vardan Mamikonian is worn on the right side of the chest, immediately after the Order of Tigran the Great.

== Description ==
=== 2002–2014 design ===
The design and sample of the Order were approved by the Government of Armenia on October 3, 2002, and ratified by the President on October 16, 2002. The Order is an equal-armed cross with semicircular openings 5 mm long and deep on each side. The cross measures 55 mm diagonally and weighs approximately 50 grams. It is made of 925 sterling silver, with the portrait of Vardan Mamikonian made of gold.

The decoration is set with nine blue sapphires of varying sizes. At the center of the cross, inside a 15.6 mm diameter circle with a silver background, is the portrait of Vardan Mamikonian facing right. Surrounding the medallion, on a 6 mm wide gold-plated background, are inscriptions in 925 silver: "SPARAPET" (Commander) above and "VARDAN MAMIKONIAN" below.

The frame of 27 mm diameter around the medallion is divided into four sections, each decorated with laurel branches. The space between the laurel branches and the edge is covered with a light sky-blue enamel layer. From the bottom tip of the cross extends a double ribbon running diagonally upwards and to the left from the right arm. At the ends of the right, left, and bottom arms, there are three-ringed loops resembling spearheads.

Within the three large loops (5 mm diameter) are two sapphires each, and within the two smaller loops (4 mm diameter) is a one-carat sapphire. The entire edge of the cross is outlined with a 1.5 mm gold band. The reverse side of the Order is smooth, with the serial number engraved above the fastening button.

The ribbon bar measures 24 x 12 mm and has a silver background with an 8 mm apricot-colored stripe in the center.

=== Current design ===
Since August 9, 2014, the design of the Order has been defined by a Presidential decree. The current description remains largely the same: an equal-armed cross with 5 mm long and deep semicircular openings on each side, measuring 55 mm diagonally and weighing 50 grams. Made of 925 sterling silver, the gold-plated portrait of Vardan Mamikonian is at the center on a silver medallion with the inscriptions "SPARAPET" above and "VARDAN MAMIKONIAN" below.

The 27 mm diameter frame with laurel branches and light sky-blue enamel remains unchanged. The double ribbon with three spearhead-shaped loops at the ends is still present, with sapphires set similarly. The edges have a 1.5 mm gold band. The reverse side is numbered. The ribbon bar is metal, 25 x 10 mm, silver with an 8 mm apricot stripe in the center.

== Award statistics ==
Since April 9, 2008, under the presidency of Serzh Sargsyan, 18 individuals have been awarded the Order: 17 senior officers and 1 mid-level officer.

Among these 18 officers, 1 held the rank of Colonel General, 6 Lieutenant Generals, 10 Major Generals, and 1 Colonel at the time of awarding.

Awards by year:

- 2008 – 1 recipient
- 2009 – 2 recipients
- 2010 – 1 recipient
- 2011 – 3 recipients
- 2012 – 7 recipients
- 2013 – 1 recipient
- 2014 – none
- 2015 – 2 recipients
- 2016 (as of February 12) – 1 recipient

== See also ==
- Orders, decorations, and medals of Armenia
