= Ibtisam Ibrahim Teresa =

Syrian novelist and short story writer (born 1959)

Ibtisam Ibrahim Teresa (Arabic: ابتسام ابراهيم تريسى) (born 1959) is a Syrian novelist and short story writer. She studied Arabic at Aleppo University. She has published five novels and two short story collections. Her novel The Eye of the Sun was longlisted for the Arabic Booker Prize in 2011.
