= Fathallah Omar =

Syrian writer (born 1966)

- Born: 1966 (age 59–60); Jableh, Latakia province, Syria
- Education: Aleppo University, PhD
- Occupations: Writer, novelist, dramatist, screenwriter

Fathallah Omar (born 1966) is a Syrian writer and novelist.

== Early life ==
Omar was born in Jableh, Latakia Governorate in Syria. He earned his PhD in communications engineering from Aleppo University.

== Career ==
Omar started his literary career as a novelist, later writing dramatic texts. He wrote scripts for a number of Syrian television shows, including the historical drama Ash-Shatat (The Diaspora), Al-Wahmoun, Wasmat Aar, and Last Gariya.

== Selected works ==
=== Novels ===
- Madaan Aleltehab (Dar Al Furat, 2014)
- Alqarabeen Alzaafa
- Raqset Albidaq (Beirut: Arab Scientific Publishers, 2015)

=== Movies ===
- Lel-adala Kalema Akhera (2009)

=== Television shows ===
- Ash-Shatat (The Diaspora), (2003)
- Al-Wahmoun (2006)
- Wasmat Aar (2007)
- Mawasem Alkhatar (2008)
- Al-Ghaliboun (2011)
- Darb Al-Yasmine (2015)
- Wojwooh Waraa Alwojooh (2015)
- Lasto Jarya (2016)
- Boh Alsanabel (2018)
- Marayia Alzaman (2020)
