= Order of Tigran the Great =

State order of Armenia

Order of Tigran the Great Armenian: Տիգրան Մեծ շքանշան
- The Order of Tigran the Great
- Type: Civil and military order
- Awarded for: Exceptional services rendered to the Republic of Armenia
- Country: Armenia
- Presented by: President of Armenia
- Eligibility: Statesmen, senior military officers, military units, and other persons
- Status: Active
- Established: June 12, 2002
- Service ribbon

Precedence
- Next (higher): Order of Glory (Armenia)
- Next (lower): Order of the Combat Cross

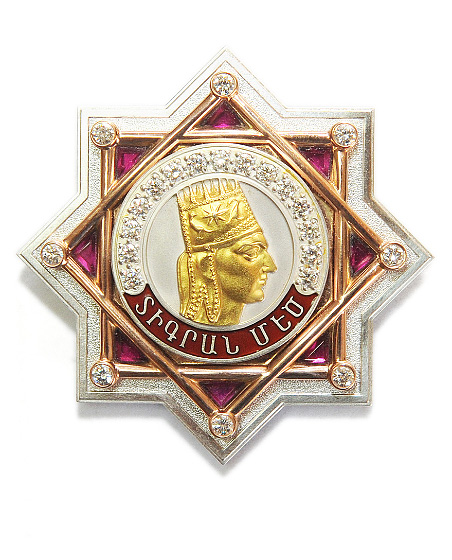
Tigran Mets Order

The Order of Tigran the Great (Armenian: Տիգրան Մեծի շքանշան) is a state award of Armenia. It was established on May 20, 2002 and is awarded for exceptional services to Armenia. The Order of Tigran the Great is awarded to statesmen of the Republic of Armenia, military personnel of the high command of the Armed Forces and other troops "for exceptional services" rendered to the state. The law on the Tigran Mets Order has been in effect since June 12, 2002. It is named after Tigranes the Great, King of Armenia from 95 BC to 55 BC.

== List of recipients ==
- Serzh Sargsyan (2006)
- Sergey Ambartsumian (2012)
- Seyran Ohanyan
- Bako Sahakyan
- Arkadi Ghukasyan (September 15, 2017)
- Gagik Harutyunyan (September 17, 2016)
- Vazgen Manukyan (September 17, 2016)

== See also ==
- Orders, decorations, and medals of Armenia
