= Hrachya Andreasyan =

Armenian military commander (1926–2015)

National Hero of Armenia Hrachya Andreasyan
- Born: 29 January 1932; Krasnodar, Russian SFSR, Soviet Union
- Died: 9 November 1999 (aged 67); Moscow, Russia
- Military career
- Allegiance: Soviet Union; Armenia
- Branch: Soviet Army; Armenian Ground Forces
- Service years: 1943-1994
- Rank: Lieutenant-General
- Conflicts: First Nagorno-Karabakh War; Battle of Shusha; Battle of Kalbajar
- Awards: see below

Hrachya Andreasyan (Armenian: Հրաչյա Հմայակի Անդրեասյան, romanized: Hrachya Hmayaki Andreasyan, Russian: Грач Амаякович Андресян, romanized: Grach Amayakovich Andresyan; 29 January 1932 – 9 November 1999) was an Armenian military commander. He was the Chief of General Staff of Armenian Armed Forces during the First Nagorno-Karabakh War.

== Early life ==
Andreasyan was born in the Russian town of Krasnodar to Armenian parents. His ancestors were refugees from Western Armenia who found refuge in Russia during the Armenian Genocide. He attended the Novocherkassk Suvorov Military School from 1943 to 1950, where he graduated with a gold medal.

Upon graduating, he spent three years at the Tbilisi School of Infantry. Andreasyan then joined the ranks of the Soviet Army. He attended the Frunze Military Academy and the Voroshilov Military Academy of the General Staff, graduating in 1966 and 1972 respectively.

From 1978, Major General Andreasyan Commander of the 6th Guards Combined Arms Army of the Leningrad Military District. In 1981, by now a Lieutenant General, he became Chief of Staff and First Deputy Commander, as well as a member of the Military Council of the North Caucasus Military District. His service in the Soviet Armed Forces ended with him being the Representative of the Supreme Commander of the Unified Armed Forces of the Warsaw Treaty Organization to the Chief of the General Staff of the Czechoslovak People's Army.

== In Armenia ==
From April 1992, he was appointed First Deputy Minister of Defense of Armenia to Vazgen Sargsyan, and in 1993, gained the additional role of Chief of the General Staff. In July 1992, he organized of defense in the Noyemberyan, Ijevan and Berdsk districts and took part in Operation Kalbajar in the fall. After the signing of the Bishkek Protocol on 12 May 1994, he resigned and left Armenia. He died on 9 November 1999 in Moscow.

== Awards and recognition ==
Andresyan was awarded many orders and medals of the USSR, the German Democratic Republic and a number of other countries.

- Order "For Service to the Homeland in the Armed Forces of the USSR" 1st, 2nd, and 3rd Class
- Jubilee Medal "In Commemoration of the 100th Anniversary of the Birth of Vladimir Ilyich Lenin"
- Medal "Veteran of the Armed Forces of the USSR"
- Medal "For Impeccable Service" 1st, 2nd, and 3rd Class
- Jubilee Medal "70 Years of the Armed Forces of the USSR"
- Jubilee Medal "60 Years of the Armed Forces of the USSR"
- Jubilee Medal "50 Years of the Armed Forces of the USSR"
- Jubilee Medal "40 Years of the Armed Forces of the USSR"

In May 2000, President Robert Kocharyan posthumously awarded the Order of the Combat Cross, 1st degree, which was presented to his widow, Zhanna Agasyevna Andresyan on the anniversary of the general's death during the unveiling of a monument on his grave. On Army Day in 2021, he was posthumously recognized as a National Hero of Armenia. A memorial plaque was installed on the house in Rostov-on-Don where Andresyan lived. In May 2008, a bust of Andresyan was erected in Vardenis, and a street was named after him.
