= Arkady Ter-Tadevosyan =

Armenian general and military commander (1939–2021)

National Hero of Armenia Arkady Ter-Tadevosyan
- Արկադի Տեր-Թադևոսյան
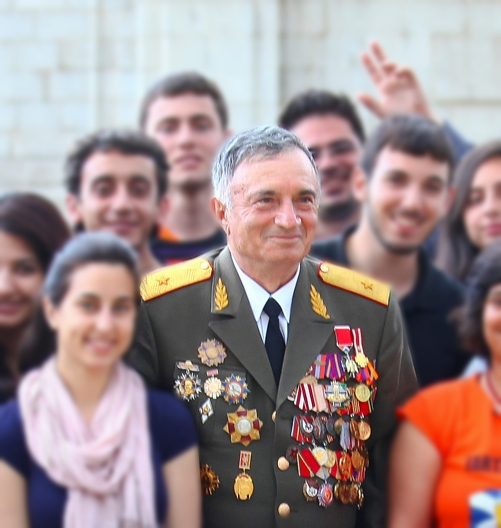
- Ter-Tadevosyan in 2012
- Born: Artush Tadevosyan; 22 May 1939; Tbilisi, Georgian SSR, Soviet Union
- Died: March 31, 2021 (aged 81); Yerevan, Armenia
- Military career
- Allegiance: Soviet Union (Republic of Artsakh) Artsakh; Armenia
- Branch: Soviet Army; Artsakh Defense Army; Armed Forces of Armenia
- Rank: Major General (1992)
- Nicknames: Komandos (in Nagorno-Karabakh); Mountain Fox (in Afghanistan)
- Commands: Nagorno-Karabakh Defense Army
- Conflicts: Soviet–Afghan War; First Nagorno-Karabakh War: Battle of Shushi
- Awards: see below

Arkady Ivani Ter-Tadevosyan (Armenian: Արկադի Իվանի (Հովհաննեսի) Տեր-Թադևոսյան; Russian: Аркадий Иванович Тер-Тадевосян; May 22, 1939 – March 31, 2021), also known by his nom-de-guerre Komandos (Armenian: Կոմանդոս), was a Soviet and Armenian Major General, a military leader of the Armenian forces during the First Nagorno-Karabakh War and Armenia's former Deputy Minister of Defense. Ter-Tadevosyan is best known as the commander of the operation to capture the town of Shushi on 8–9 May 1992.

== Biography ==
Arkady Ter-Tadevosyan was born Artush Oganesovich Tadevosyan in Tbilisi, Georgian SSR. After graduating from a high school in Tbilisi, he decided to become an officer. He attended the Baku Combined Arms Command School and later the Leningrad Military Academy of Rear Services and Transportation. He served in Afghanistan where he earned the nickname "Mountain Fox." He continued his military service in the Soviet Army in Leninakan (modern-day Gyumri), East Germany, Czechoslovakia, Belarus, and Yerevan. He also served as a lecturer at the Armenian State Agrarian University. With the breakup of the Soviet Union and the brewing conflict in Nagorno-Karabakh, Ter-Tadevosyan took part in organizing in 1990 the defense of Armenian villages straddling the borders of Soviet Azerbaijan. He joined the Sasuntsi Davit Detachment to defend villages from constant attacks launched by Azerbaijani militants.

== First Nagorno-Karabakh War ==
Thereafter, he went to Nagorno-Karabakh to train soldiers. Ter-Tadevosyan was appointed Head of Training Corps Defense Committee in 1991. In 1992 he was named commander of the operation (dubbed "Operation Wedding in the Mountains") to seize the strategic town of Shushi, the capture of which on 9 May 1992 marked the first significant military victory by Armenian forces during the First Nagorno-Karabakh War. Ter-Tadevosyan is known in Armenia as the "mastermind of the liberation of Shushi." He participated in the formation of the Armed Forces of Armenia and assisted it to overcome significant challenges before it could emerge as a well-developed institution. On 25 May 1992, Ter-Tadevosyan was awarded the rank of Major General for his accomplishments during the First Nagorno-Karabakh War. He also received the Order of the Combat Cross (1st class).

== Later life and death ==
In May 2000, Ter-Tadevosyan left the Yerkrapah veterans union and founded the Veterans of the War of Liberation organization, although he left it in July of that year, expressing personal grievances about those who had joined it.

The President of the Nagorno-Karabakh Republic, Bako Sahakyan, awarded him the Order of the Golden Eagle and the title of Hero of Artsakh on the 17th anniversary of the Capture of Shushi in 2009. The region continued to hold much meaning for Ter-Tadevosyan, who spent at least one week each month there.

During the later years of his military career Ter-Tadevosyan supervised the training of specialists in the Armenian armed forces. He died in Yerevan on 31 March 2021. Condolences were sent by Prime Minister Nikol Pashinyan, President Armen Sarksyan and former president Robert Kocharyan. A requiem service for the commander took place on 2 April at the Karen Demirchyan Complex and a religious ceremony was also held on 3 April at the St. John's Church in Yerevan. Upon his request, he was buried at the family cemetery in Davitashen District.

== Legacy ==
On 8 May 2021, which is the Shushi Liberation Day, Ter-Tadevosyan was posthumously named National Hero of Armenia Prime Minister Nikol Pashinyan also awarded Ter-Tadevosyan with the Order of the Motherland, which he handed over to his son Hayk Ter-Tadevosyan. A house museum is planned for Ter-Tadevosyan.

== Awards ==
- (Soviet Union) Order of the Red Banner
- (Soviet Union) Order of the Badge of Honour
- (Soviet Union) Medal "Veteran of the Armed Forces of the USSR"
- (Soviet Union) Jubilee Medal "Twenty Years of Victory in the Great Patriotic War 1941–1945"
- (Soviet Union) Jubilee Medal "50 Years of the Armed Forces of the USSR"
- (Soviet Union) Jubilee Medal "60 Years of the Armed Forces of the USSR"
- (Soviet Union) Jubilee Medal "70 Years of the Armed Forces of the USSR"
- (Soviet Union) Jubilee Medal "50 Years of Victory in the Great Patriotic War 1941–1945"
- (Soviet Union) Medal "For Impeccable Service", 1st class
- (Soviet Union) Medal "For Impeccable Service", 2nd class
- (Soviet Union) Medal "For Impeccable Service", 3rd class
- (Armenia) Order of the Combat Cross, 1st class
- (Republic of Artsakh) Hero of Artsakh (2009)
- National Hero of Armenia (2021, posthumously)
