= Hatsik, Shirak =

Hatsik Հացիկ
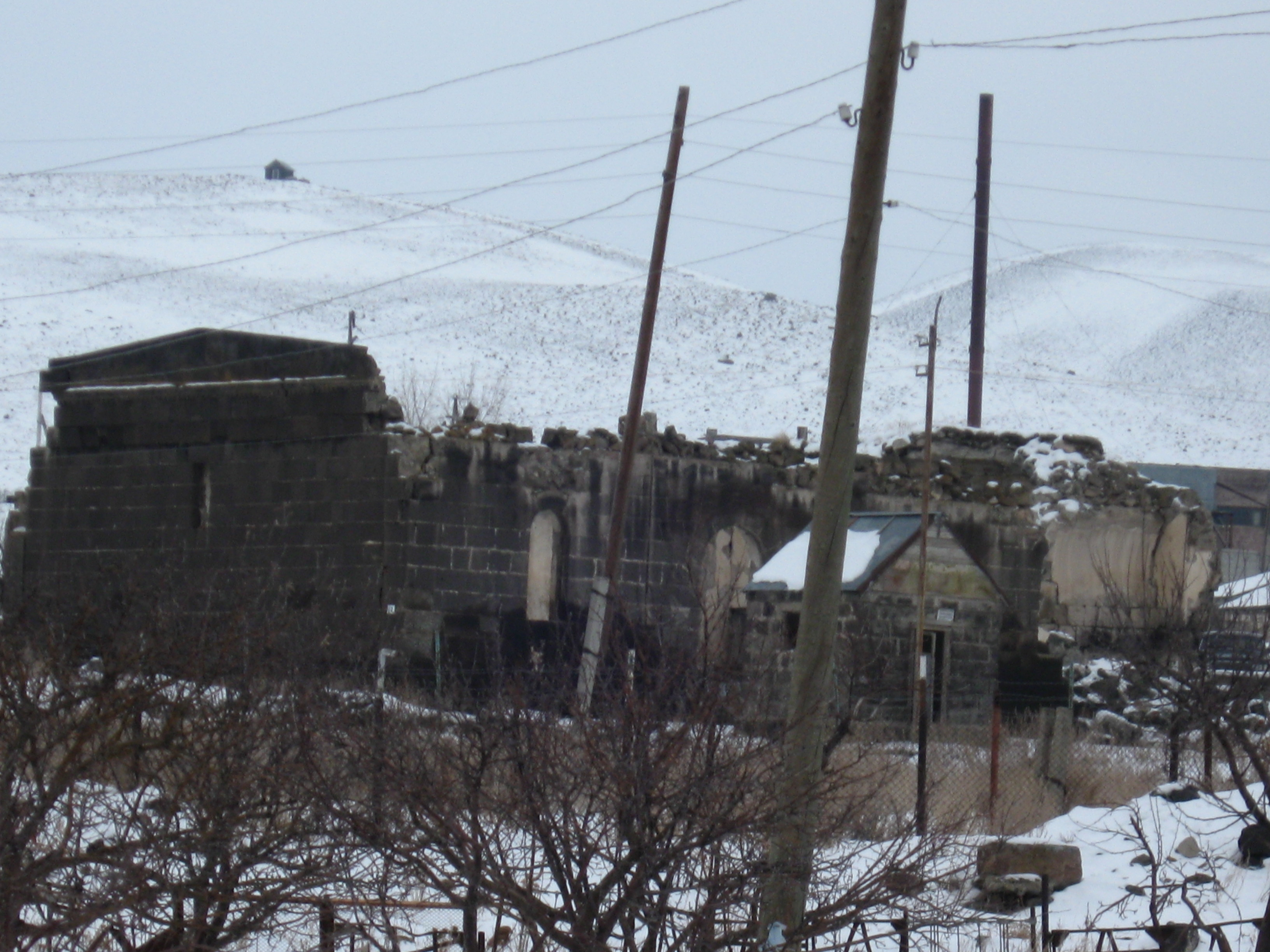

- Location within Armenia Location within Shirak
- Coordinates: 40°50′51″N 43°52′27″E
- Country: Armenia
- Province: Shirak
- Municipality: Akhuryan
- Elevation: 1,650 m (5,410 ft)

Population (2011)
  - Total: 937
- Time zone: UTC+4

Hatsik (Armenian: Հացիկ) is a village in the Akhuryan Municipality of the Shirak Province of Armenia.

== Demographics ==
Historical population
Year	Pop.	±% p.a.
1831	327	—
1897	864	+1.48%
1926	888	+0.09%
1939	1,068	+1.43%
1959	879	−0.97%
1970	894	+0.15%
1979	820	−0.96%
1989	925	+1.21%
2001	1,081	+1.31%
2011	937	−1.42%

== Natural conditions ==
The climate is temperate. Winters are long and cold. There are severe winds snow storms. The annual precipitation is about 500 to 600 mm (20 to 24 in). Blach tuff and coal reserves are in the area. The village is located 4.5 km (2.8 mi) northeast of the regional capital of Gyumri. It is 1,650 m (5,410 ft) above sea level. The lowest temperature of -25% to +35%. The village is in a seismic zone where earthquakes are frequent.
