= Nigatun =

Nigatun Նիգատուն
- Location within Armenia Location within Aragatsotn
- Coordinates: 40°25′53″N 44°21′46″E
- Country: Armenia
- Province: Aragatsotn
- Municipality: Ashtarak
- Elevation: 1,850 m (6,070 ft)
- Time zone: UTC+4

Nigatun (Armenian: Նիգատուն) is an abandoned village in the Ashtarak Municipality of the Aragatsotn Province of Armenia.
