= Scrag end =

Cut of lamb and mutton

Diagram of cuts of lamb in the United Kingdom. Scrag end is shown in yellow.

Scrag end is a primal cut of lamb and mutton taken from the neck and common in the United Kingdom and the Commonwealth.

== Value ==
Scrag end is one of the cheaper cuts of meat, and is often used in soups and stews. In the United States, scrag end is known as the neck. Unlike scrag end, cutlets come from the part of the neck considered best, known as the middle neck.
