= Prishib, Astrakhan Oblast =

Prishib Пришиб
- Selo
- Location within Astrakhan Oblast Location within Russia
- Coordinates: 47°40′N 46°28′E
- Country: Russia
- Region: Astrakhan Oblast
- District: Yenotayevsky District
- Time zone: UTC+4:00

Prishib (Russian: Пришиб) is a rural locality (a selo) and the administrative center of Prishibinsky Selsoviet of Yenotayevsky District, Astrakhan Oblast, Russia. The population was 1,096 as of 2010. There are 13 streets.

== Geography ==
Prishib is located 70 km northwest of Yenotayevka (the district's administrative centre) by road. Nikolskoye is the nearest rural locality.
