= Prishib, Republic of Bashkortostan =

Prishib Пришиб
- Selo
- Location within Bashkortostan Location within Russia
- Coordinates: 54°50′N 55°09′E
- Country: Russia
- Region: Bashkortostan
- District: Blagovarsky District
- Time zone: UTC+5:00

Prishib (Russian: Пришиб) is a rural locality (a selo) and the administrative centre of Alexeyevsky Selsoviet, Blagovarsky District, Bashkortostan, Russia. The population was 907 as of 2010. There are 8 streets.

== Geography ==
Prishib is located 31 km northeast of Yazykovo (the district's administrative centre) by road. Moiseyevo is the nearest rural locality.
