= Relief of Fevers =

Relief of Fevers (Armenian: Ջերմանց Մխիթարություն, Jermants Mkhitarutiun) is an encyclopedic study written by medieval Armenian physician Mkhitar Heratsi in 1184, which has survived in full. The author uses the word fever to designate diseases that cause fever, such as malaria, yellow fever, and typhoid, which seem to have been common in the lowlands of Cilicia at the time. The fact that the book is written not in Classical Armenian (grabar) but in the vernacular is evidence that the author wanted to make it available to ordinary people. Heratsi speaks at lengths on the symptoms of various fevers; for example, he gives a clinical prognosis of three types of malaria, namely, quotidian (miorya), tertan (alternate days, yerekorya), and quartan (three days apart, chorekorya).

The manuscript was discovered in 1727 in Constantinople and was purchased by the National Library of Paris. It appeared in print for the first time in 1832 in Venice. Later in the century, it was brought to the attention of Western scholars by a number of German researchers who published some excerpts in German. Excerpts were also published in French by Vahram Torkomian in 1899. The whole work was translated into German by Ernst Seidel in 1908. A Russian translation was published in Yerevan in 1955.
