= Hatsik, Armavir =

Village in Armavir, Armenia

Hatsik Հացիկ
- Location within Armenia
- Coordinates: 40°09′51″N 43°56′27″E
- Country: Armenia
- Province: Armavir
- Founded: 1933

Population (2011)
  - Total: 2,331
- Time zone: UTC+4 ( )
  - Summer (DST)

Hatsik (Armenian: Հացիկ, also Romanized as Hats’ik and Atsik; until 1963, Sovkhoz Imeni Voroshilova, from 1963 to 1991, Nairi) is a village in the Armavir Province of Armenia. It was founded in 1933 as center of a sovkhoz named in honor of Kliment Voroshilov, a Soviet politician, and later called Nairi from 1963 to 1991. Population is 2973.

== See also ==
- Armavir Province
