= Mkhitar Heratsi =

Armenian physician

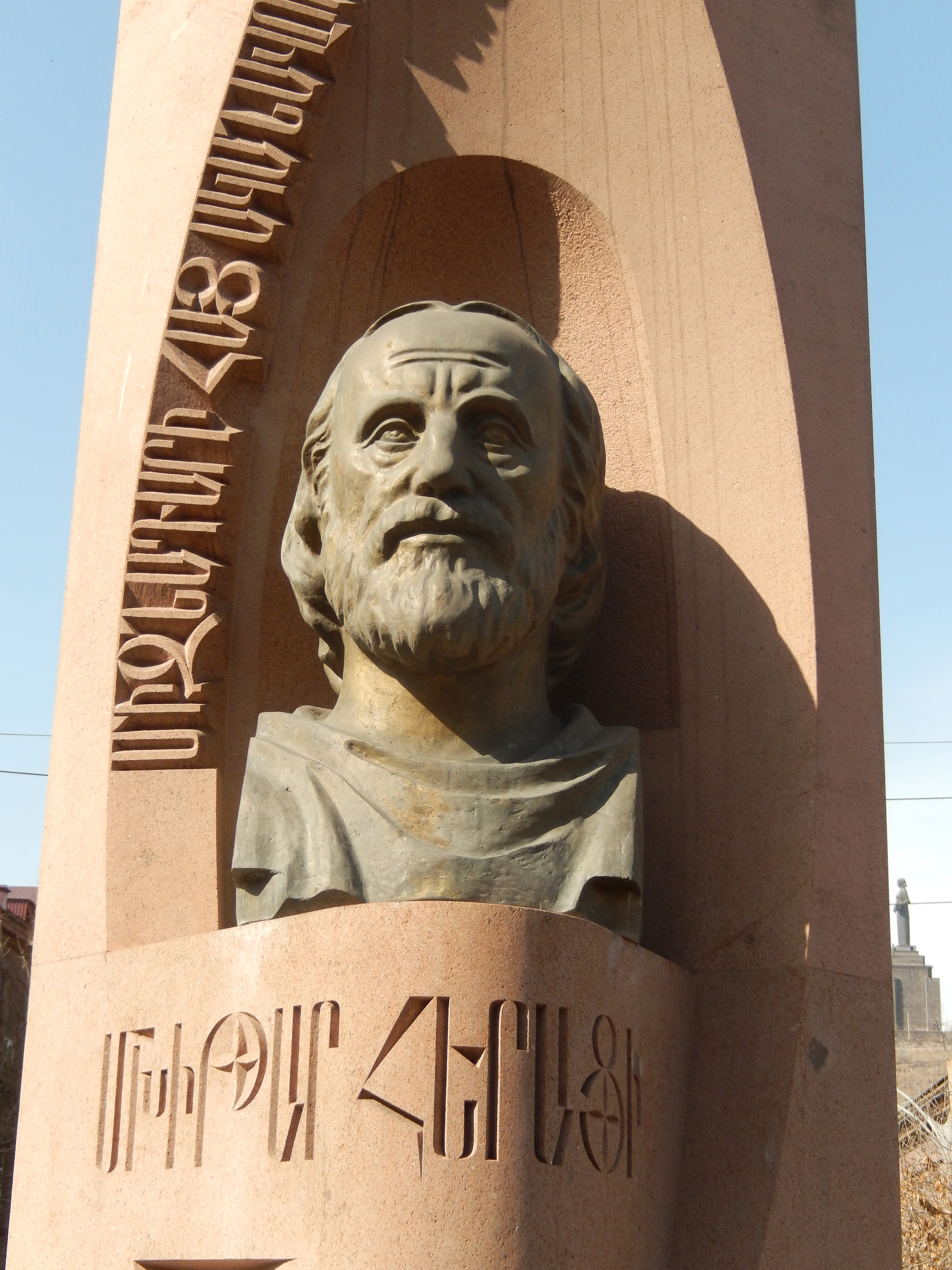
Bust of Mkhitar Heratsi

Mkhitar Heratsi (Armenian: Մխիթար Հերացի) was a 12th-century Armenian physician. He was born in Khoy (present-day northwestern Iran). He was well versed in the Persian, Greek, and Arabic languages. Heratsi, often considered the father of Armenian medicine, was the author of the Relief of Fevers, an encyclopedic work in which he discussed, among other subjects, surgery, diet and psychotherapy.

== Legacy ==
A complete manuscript of the Relief of Fevers was discovered in Constantinople in 1727 and acquired by the French National Library in Paris. A complete translation of the work was first published in German by Ernst Seidel in 1908. Yerevan State Medical University has been named after Mkhitar Heratsi since 1989 and awards the "Mkhitar Heratsi Scholarship" to excellent students.
