= Orders, decorations, and medals of Armenia =

National Hero of Armenia

Awards and decorations of Armenia are military and civil decorations of Armenia which are bestowed by various agencies of the Armenian government for acts of accomplishment benefiting the government and the Armenian nation as a whole.

== National Hero of Armenia ==
National Hero of Armenia is the highest title in Armenia.

The law on the title of the "National Hero of Armenia" has been in effect since April 22, 1994.

"National Hero of Armenia" is awarded for outstanding services of national importance to Armenia in defense and strengthening of the state system and creation of important national values. Those who are awarded the title of the "National Hero of Armenia" also receive an Order of Fatherland.

Famous recipients are:

- Vazgen I, Patriarch and Catholicos of All Armenians
- Charles Aznavour, world-famous French-Armenian singer

== Order of the Combat Cross ==
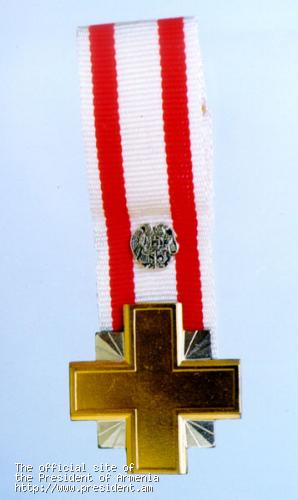
Order of Combat Cross of the Second Degree

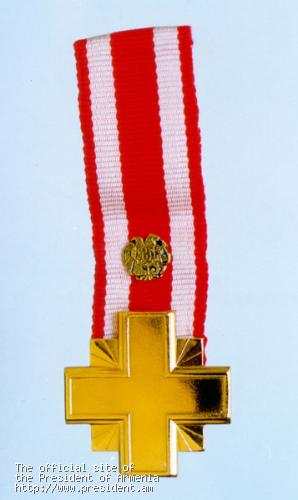
Order of Combat Cross of the First Degree

- The Order of the Combat Cross is awarded for absolute courage, selflessness and skill in defending the Fatherland. There are two degrees to the Order of the Combat cross: The Order of the Combat Cross of the First Degree and The Order of the Combat Cross of the Second Degree. The law on the Order of the Combat Cross has been in effect since April 22, 1994.
  - Order of the Combat Cross of the First Degree is awarded to
    - Military personnel of the Republic of Armenia for absolute bravery and personal courage in defending the Fatherland, as well as other people for significant contribution to the defense of the country.
    - Senior military commanders of the Republic of Armenia for significant success during military action.
  - Order of the Combat Cross of the Second Degree is awarded to
    - The military personnel and senior commanders of the Republic of Armenia for skillfully carrying out their military orders, as well as to other people for significant contribution the carrying out of military orders.
    - Employees of Ministries of Internal Affairs, National Security and the Customs, as well as other people for personal courage in preservation of public order.

== Civil orders of Armenia ==
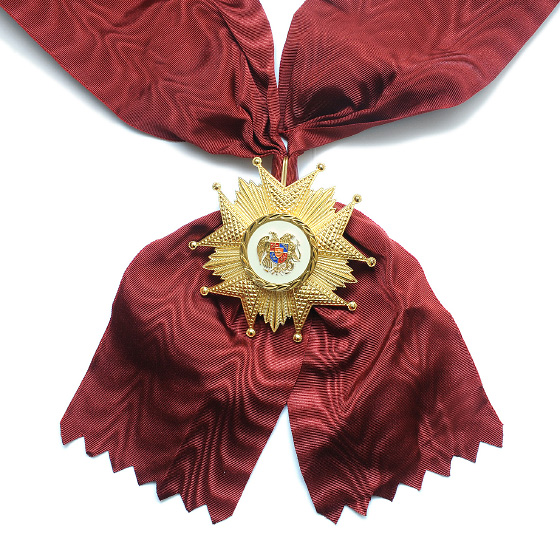
Order of Glory

The Order of Glory was founded on 22 December 2010 and is awarded to:

- Foreign heads of state
- Heads of foreign government
- heads of international organizations,
- Religious leaders

It is awarded for significant contribution to strengthening and development of bilateral relations, for the preservation of peace and security, for the protection of human rights and fundamental freedoms, in activities which encourage the development of economic relations, preservation of spiritual values and cultural activities.

The ribbon of the order is crimson red.

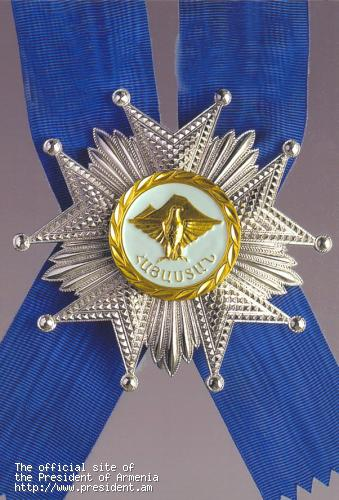
Order of Honour

The Order of Honour is offered for special services to the protection of the state and national interests of Armenia, to its independence and to the strengthening of democracy, as well as for significant contribution to the establishment, strengthening and development of friendship with Armenia and the promotion of peace between nations. The law on the Order of Honour has been in effect since July 27, 2000. The Order of Honour is awarded to:

- Heads of states and governments of foreign countries
- Diplomatic representatives of foreign countries
- Foreign political, economic, cultural and public figures, philanthropists
- Representatives of international organizations who are not citizens of Armenia
- Foreign religious figures

The ribbon of the order is azure blue.

== Tigran Mets Order ==
Tigran Mets Order

Tigran Mets Order is awarded for exceptional services to the Republic of Armenia. The law on the Tigran Mets Order has been in effect since June 12, 2002. It is named after Tigranes the Great. The Tigran Mets Order is awarded to:

- State officials of the Republic of Armenia and top military commanders of the Armenian Armed Forces and other forces of the Republic of Armenia.

== Order of Saint Vardan Mamikonian ==
Vardan Mamikonian Order

Order of Saint Vardan Mamikonian is awarded for exceptional courage on military duty, as well as for notable services in army development and increasing the combat readiness of the armed forces. The law on the Vardan Mamikonian Order has been in effect since June 12, 2002. It is named after Vardan Mamikonian. The Vardan Mamikonian Order is awarded to:

- Senior and top military officers of the Armenian Armed Forces and other forces.

== Order of St. Mesrop Mashtots ==
Order of St. Mesrop Mashtots

Order of St. Mesrop Mashtots is awarded for significant achievements in economic development of the Republic of Armenia, natural and social sciences, inventions, culture, education, healthcare, and public service, as well as for activities promoting scientific, technological, economic and cultural cooperation with foreign countries. The law on the St. Mesrop Mashtots Order has been in effect since July 26, 1993. It is named after Mesrop Mashtots.

== Order for Services to the Fatherland ==
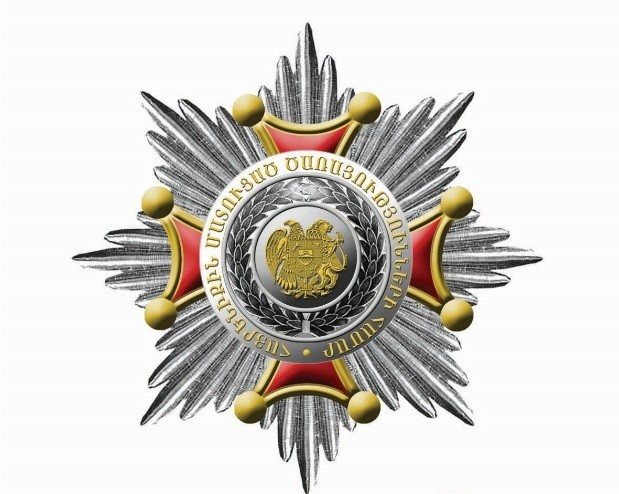
Order for Services to the Fatherland first-degree

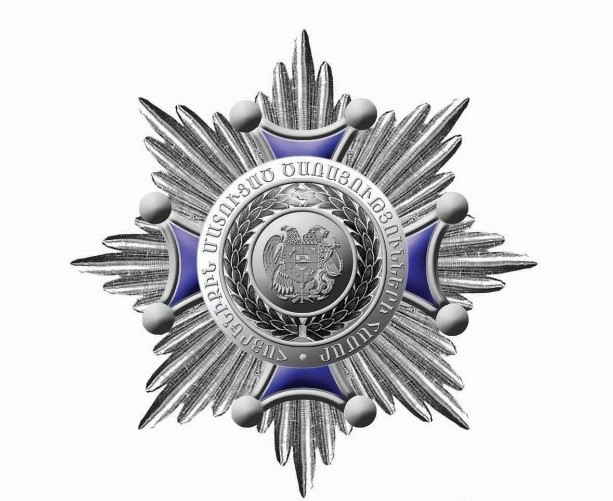
Order for Services to the Fatherland second-degree

The Order for Services to the Fatherland is awarded for state, social and political activity and significant achievements in the spheres of economy, the defense of the fatherland, national security, as well as in humanitarian sphere and for other outstanding services.

The Order for Services to the Fatherland has two degrees:

- The first-degree Order for Services to the Fatherland;
- The second-degree Order for Services to the Fatherland.
- The highest degree of the Order for Services to the Fatherland is the first degree.

== Order of Friendship ==
Order of Friendship

The Order of Friendship is awarded for significant services in promoting mutual understanding in the political, scientific and educational, cultural and religious spheres, as well for strengthening and bolstering friendly ties between peoples.

== Medal for Courage ==
Medal for Courage

Medal for Courage is awarded for courage in defending the Fatherland, protecting the public order, as well as in rescue operations and for performing duties in life-threatening conditions. The Medal for Courage is awarded to employees of the Armenian military forces, the Ministries of Internal Affairs and National Security, the Department of Emergency Situations and the Customs services, as well as to other people. The law on the Medal for Courage has been in effect since July 26, 1993.

== Medal for Combat Service ==
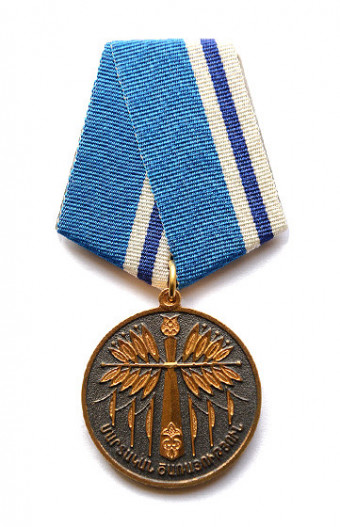
Medal for Combat Service

Medal for Combat Service is awarded for skillful, original and brave action in performance of military duties, for keeping the army in military preparedness and for service rendered in protection of the country's borders. The Medal for Combat Service is conferred upon Armenian military personnel, as well as other persons. The Law on the Medal for Combat Service has been in effect since July 26, 1993.

== Anania Shirakatsi Medal ==
Anania Shirakatsi Medal

Anania Shirakatsi Medal is awarded for notable activities in economy, engineering, science and technology, as well as for significant inventions and discoveries. The law on the Anania Shirakatsi Medal has been in effect since July 26, 1993. The law was amended on November 15, 2000. It is named after Anania Shirakatsi.

== Mkhitar Heratsi Medal ==
Mkhitar Heratsi Medal

Mkhitar Heratsi Medal is awarded for services to the development of healthcare in Armenia, high professionalism, practical work, as well as for significant philanthropic activities. The Mkhitar Heratsi Medal is awarded to civilian and military doctors, junior and middle medical personnel, pharmacist, as well as philanthropists and other persons. The law on the Mkhitar Heratsi Medal has been in effect since July 26, 1993. It is named after Mkhitar Heratsi.

== Mkhitar Gosh Medal ==
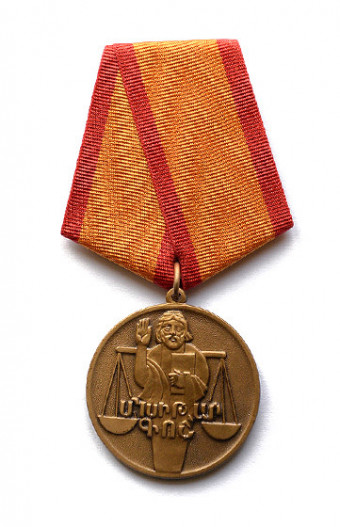

Mkhitar Gosh Medal is awarded for notable state, public and political activities, as well as significant services in the areas of diplomacy, law and political science. The law on the Mkhitar Gosh Medal has been in effect since July 26, 1993. It is named after Mkhitar Gosh.

== Movses Khorenatsi Medal ==
Movses Khorenatsi Medal

Movses Khorenatsi Medal is awarded for notable creative achievements in Armenian culture, arts, literature, education and the humanities. The law on the Movses Khorenatsi Medal has been in effect since July 26, 1993. It is named after Movses Khorenatsi.

== Honorary Titles in the Republic of Armenia ==
According to the September 12, 2001 "Law on Honorary Titles of the Republic of Armenia in the Areas of Science, Education, Journalism, Culture, Arts, Healthcare, Physical Culture and Sports," the following Honorary Titles have been created for notable contribution to and exceptional achievements in the areas of science, education, journalism, culture, arts, healthcare, physical culture and sports:

- Merited Scientist of the Republic of Armenia
- Merited Educator of the Republic of Armenia
- Merited Journalist of the Republic of Armenia
- Merited Culture Worker of the Republic of Armenia
- Merited Arts Worker of the Republic of Armenia
- Merited Artist of the Republic of Armenia
- People's Artist of the Republic of Armenia
- Merited Painter of the Republic of Armenia
- People's Painter of the Republic of Armenia
- Merited Architect of the Republic of Armenia
- Merited Doctor of the Republic of Armenia
- Merited Lawyer of the Republic of Armenia
- Merited Physical Culture and Sports Worker of the Republic of Armenia

== Historical ==
- Order of Saint Blaise, 12th century order, took its name from Saint Blaise, patron saint of the Armenian kingdom

== See also ==
- Orders, decorations, and medals of the Republic of Artsakh
