= EA WorldView =

News portal

- Screenshot
- Website type: Intelligence
- Available in: English
- Editor: Scott Lucas
- Website: eaworldview.com
- Commercial: No
- Registration: No
- Launched: 2008; 18 years ago
- Current status: Online

EA WorldView is a website specializing in news coverage and analysis of Iran, Syria, and the wider Middle East.

== History ==
The site, originally known as Enduring America, was created in 2008 by Scott Lucas when he taught International Politics and American Studies at the University of Birmingham, England. During the 2009 Iranian presidential election protests, it liveblogged the demonstrations. EA later liveblogged the civil uprising phase of the Syrian Civil War.

== Organization ==
Its partners include the University of Birmingham's Political Science and International Studies department which hosts its podcast Political WorldView and University College Dublin's Clinton Institute.
