= National Hero of Armenia =

Highest title in Armenia

National Hero of Armenia Armenian: Հայաստանի ազգային հերոս
- The Order of Fatherland
- Awarded for: Outstanding services of national importance to the Republic of Armenia in defense and strengthening of the state system and creation of important national values
- Country: Armenia
- Presented by: President of Armenia
- Eligibility: Armenian citizens, foreign citizens and stateless persons
- Status: Active
- Established: April 1, 1994
- First award: July 28, 1994

Highlights
- Total: 27
- Service ribbon

Precedence
- Next (lower): Order of Glory

National Hero of Armenia (Armenian: Հայաստանի ազգային հերոս, romanized: Hayastani azgayin heros) is the highest title in Armenia. The law on the title was signed by President Levon Ter-Petrosyan on 22 April 1994. It is awarded "for outstanding services of national importance to the Republic of Armenia in defense and strengthening of the state system and creation of important national values." Along with the title, its recipients receive the Order of Fatherland. It was created as the Armenian successor to the Hero of the Soviet Union award, which was abolished upon independence of Armenia.

The first recipient of the title was Catholicos Vazgen I, the head of the Armenian church, who received it on 28 July 1994.

== Recipients ==
This is a table of persons who were awarded the 'National Hero of Armenia':

Date	Recipient	Occupation
27 May 2004	Kirk Kerkorian	businessman, philanthropist
27 May 2004	Charles Aznavour	singer, philanthropist
5 December 2008	Nikolai Ryzhkov	politician
9 October 2017	Eduardo Eurnekian	business, philanthropist
30 December 2017	Ohannes Tchekidjian	conductor, composer
18 August 2020	Ruben Sanamyan	military commander
27 August 2020	Hrayr Hovakimyan	cardio-surgeon
15 October 2020	Vahagn Asatryan	military commander
22 October 2020	Tiran Khachatryan	military commander
22 October 2020	Andranik Piloyan	military commander
27 January 2021	Tatul Ghazaryan	military commander
27 January 2021	Hrachia Andreasyan	military commander
27 January 2021	Gurgen Dalibaltayan	military commander
8 May 2021	Arkady Ter-Tatevosyan	military commander

== See also ==
- Orders, decorations, and medals of Armenia
- Hero of Artsakh
