= Blockade of Nagorno-Karabakh =

Part of the Nagorno-Karabakh conflict

- Part of the Nagorno-Karabakh conflict
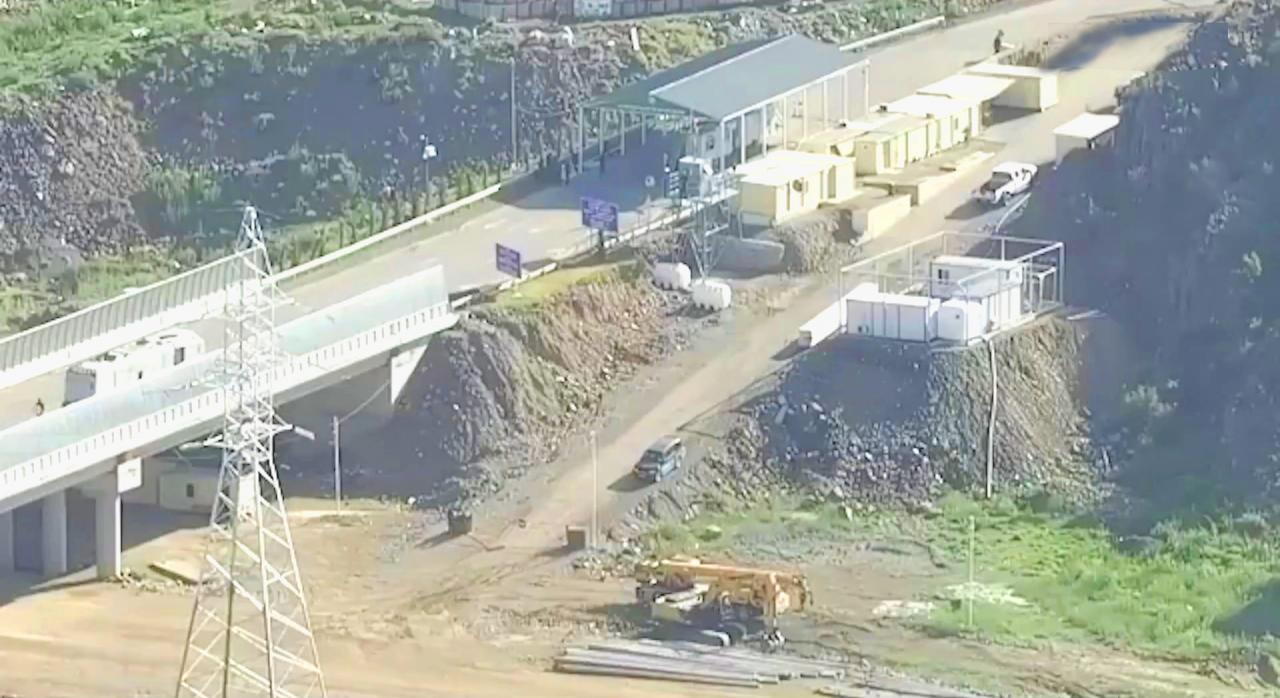
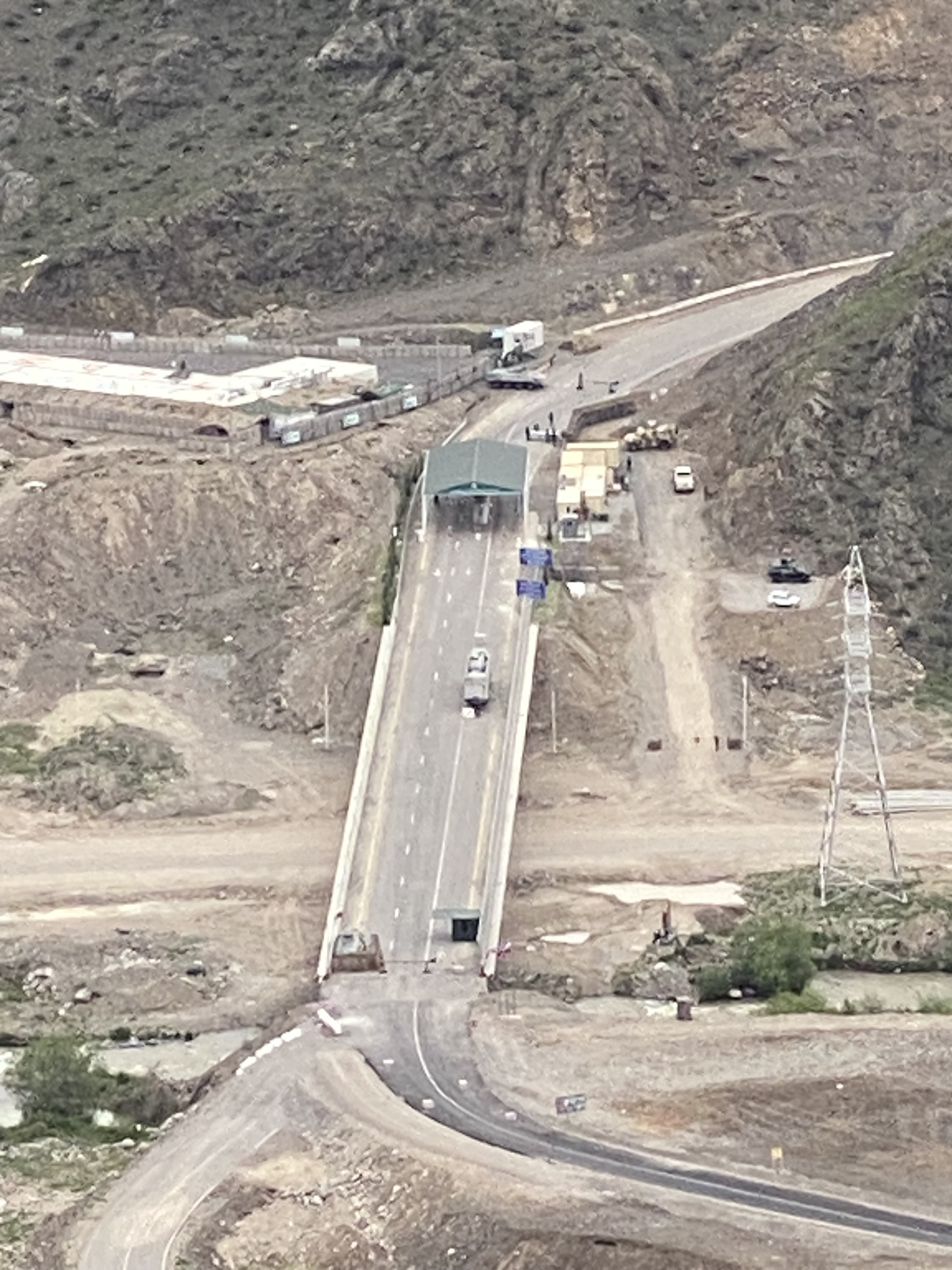
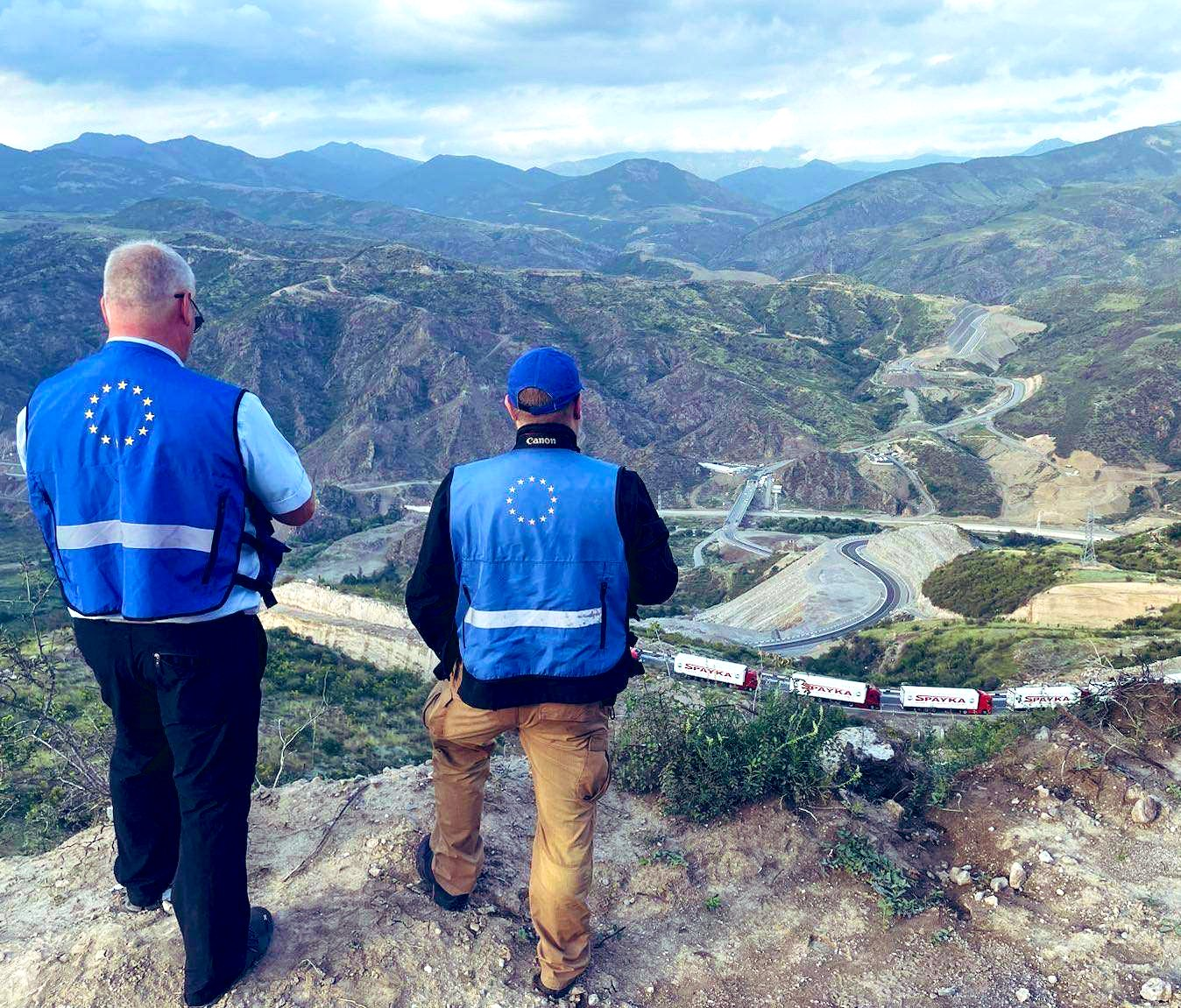
- Azerbaijan's military checkpoint on the Lachin corridor (top and bottom left), which was the only road connecting Artsakh to the outside world. EUMA monitors view the military checkpoint in the distance and the emergency aid convoy of trucks that Azerbaijan has blocked from entering (bottom right).
- Date: 12 December 2022 – 30 September 2023 (9 months, 2 weeks and 4 days)
- Location: Nagorno-Karabakh
- Goals: Delegitimize and undermine the government of the self-proclaimed Republic of Artsakh; Annex the region to Azerbaijan; Ethnically cleanse the region of ethnic Armenians; Obtain concessions from Armenia
- Methods: Blockade of multiple roads; Barred entry and exit of food, supplies, and people; Damage or cuts to public utilities (Internet, gas, electricity) and prevention of their repair; Erection of military checkpoint; False environmentalism
- Result: Scarcity and rationing of food, medical supplies, and electricity; Separation of families; Hundreds of people unable to receive surgeries; Scarcity of electricity and gas; Depletion of water reservoirs; Detention of independent media personnel; Disregard for international legal rulings; Closure of all schools; Azerbaijan launching an offensive against Artsakh in September 2023

Parties
Azerbaijan	(Russia) Russian peacekeepers	Artsakh

Lead figures
(Azerbaijan) Ilham Aliyev (Note: Azerbaijani Foreign Minister Jeyhun Bayramov also specified a condition for lifting the blockade initiated by the "eco-protestors".)	(Russia) Kirill Kulakov (3–30 September 2023) (Russia) Alexander Lentsov (25 April – 2 September 2023)	(Republic of Artsakh) Samvel Shahramanyan (10–30 September 2023) (Republic of Artsakh) Arayik Harutyunyan (until 1 September 2023)

Material consequences for individuals
- Deaths: 4 civilians (Note: a patient who could not be transferred to Armenia for medical care, two children, and one man)
- Detained: 2 independent journalists, 5 civilians
- Workers laid off: 11,000, including over 50% of private sector workers

The blockade of Nagorno-Karabakh was an event in the Nagorno-Karabakh conflict. The region was disputed between Azerbaijan and the breakaway Republic of Artsakh, internationally recognised as part of Azerbaijan, which had an ethnic Armenian population and was supported by neighbouring Armenia, until the dissolution of the Republic of Artsakh on 28 September 2023.

On 12 December 2022, under the guise of environmental protests, the Azerbaijani government launched a blockade of the Republic of Artsakh by sending citizens claiming to be eco-activists to block the Lachin corridor, a humanitarian corridor which connected Artsakh to Armenia and the outside world. Disguised military personnel, civil servants, members of pro-government NGOs, and youth organisations were among the so-called activists. The Azerbaijani government consolidated its blockade by seizing territory around the Lachin corridor both within Artsakh and Armenia, blocking alternative bypass routes, and installing military checkpoints. Azerbaijan also sabotaged critical civilian infrastructure of Artsakh, crippling access to gas, electricity, and internet access.

The blockade led to a humanitarian crisis for the population in Artsakh; imports of essential goods, humanitarian convoys of the Red Cross and the Russian peacekeepers were blocked, trapping the 120,000 residents of the region. Shortages of essential goods – including electricity, fuel, and water reserves – were widespread and emergency reserves were rationed, along with mass unemployment, and closures of schools and public transportation. Azerbaijan claimed its actions were aimed at preventing the transportation of weapons and natural resources; it also said its goal was for Artsakh's "integration" into Azerbaijan, despite opposition from the population, and threatened military action.

Numerous countries, international organizations, and human rights observers condemned the blockade and considered it to be a form of hybrid warfare and ethnic cleansing, with possible risks of genocide. Multiple international observers also considered the blockade and the inaction of the Russian peacekeepers to be violations of the tripartite ceasefire agreement signed between Armenia, Azerbaijan, and Russia, which ended the Second Nagorno-Karabakh War and guaranteed safe passage through the Lachin corridor. Azerbaijan ignored calls from various countries and international organizations to restore freedom of movement through the corridor. The blockade ended on 30 September 2023, following an Azerbaijani military offensive and the subsequent expulsion of Armenians from Nagorno-Karabakh.

== Background ==
The Republic of Artsakh, also known as the Nagorno-Karabakh Republic, was a de facto state located on territory that is internationally recognized as part of Azerbaijan. The vast majority of Artsakh's inhabitants are ethnic Armenians; the mainland of Armenia is located to the west of Azerbaijan. The Republic of Artsakh was not recognized by any country, including Armenia; however, for the past 30 years, international mediators had emphasized the right of self-determination for the local Armenian population.

Despite being offered Azerbaijani citizenship, Artsakh residents did not trust Azerbaijan's guarantees of security due to the country's history of human rights abuses, Armenophobia, and lack of rights to ethnic minorities. Since the Second Nagorno-Karabakh War in 2020, Azerbaijan no longer promised any special status or autonomy to its ethnic Armenian residents. The Republic of Artsakh also became increasingly dependent on Armenia since territories with vital agricultural, water, and energy resources were surrendered to Azerbaijan as per the ceasefire agreement. Before the blockade, Artsakh imported 90% of its food from Armenia. As per the 2020 ceasefire agreement, Armenian forces were removed from the region and Russian peacekeeping forces were given a mandate in the region until 2025. Up until the 2022 blockade, the Russian peacekeepers controlled entry and exit through the Lachin corridor and shared lists of people entering with Azerbaijan.

=== First blockade (1989–2023) and isolation from Armenia (1989–1992) ===
Artsakh and neighbouring Armenia were blockaded for the first time in August 1989, with Azerbaijan severing transport and economic links both between Armenia and Azerbaijan and between Artsakh and Armenia. This blockade was later joined by Turkey in support of Azerbaijan and has continued into the present day. The national assembly of Nagorno-Karabakh voted to reunite with Armenia, resulting in Azerbaijan attempting to revoke its autonomy and sieging its capital for 6 months. The complete isolation of Artsakh from the outside world lasted for 3 years until Armenian forces opened a humanitarian corridor known as the Lachin corridor to Armenia in May 1992.

In its attempt to isolate the region, the Azerbaijani government blacklists individuals from humanitarian organizations and journalists who work in Artsakh. As a result of this, the only international organizations who work within Artsakh are HALO and the ICRC. The Parliamentary Assembly of the Council of Europe, Reporters Without Borders, and the International Federation of Journalists, have called on Azerbaijan to allow entry of independent organizations, including United Nations agencies. The political isolation and existential threats that Artsakh residents experience from Azerbaijan have cultivated a siege mentality in public life.

=== Threats to public utility infrastructure and entry ===
Because the Lachin corridor remains the only transportation route in and out of Artsakh, it is considered a humanitarian corridor and essential "lifeline" to Artsakh residents. The Lachin corridor is also used to supply the region with all of its electricity, Internet, telephone infrastructure, and natural gas. In 2017, a second and faster highway was built between Artsakh and Armenia (the Vardenis–Martakert highway), but this alternative route has been closed since Azerbaijan took control of the Dadivank-Sotk section (in Kalbajar) during the Second Nagorno-Karabakh War (2020). There has not been regular air transit into and out of Artsakh since the Stepanakert Airport was closed in 1990 during the First Nagorno-Karabakh War. The Artsakh government has attempted to re-open the commercial airport multiple times since it was reconstructed in 2011 but has been blocked by Azerbaijan, who warns that airplanes flying over Nagorno-Karabakh will be destroyed.

In the first month after the end of the 2020 Nagorno-Karabakh War, residents complained about unstable cellular communications and problems with the Internet. The problem was somewhat rectified with the replacement of damaged sections of fiber-optic cable in the Lachin corridor through the mediation of Russian peacekeeping forces. However, beginning in August 2021, the problem arose again, with the problem being more acute during the daytime and for communities located close to the Line of Contact. Artsakh officials and experts stated that Azerbaijan had also installed mobile jamming devices which interfere with communications.

The gas connection to Artsakh has been severed three times by Azerbaijan in 2022, with the longest shutoff period lasting 3 weeks. Officials from the Parliamentary Council of Europe, Armenia, and Artsakh have said that Azerbaijan can disrupt the gas supply to Artsakh on demand by means of a control valve that Azerbaijan installed in March 2020 during repair works. A PACE report said that the observation that gas does not go beyond the village of Pekh indicates that a control valve was installed.

After Azerbaijan closed the Vardenis–Martakert highway in 2020, Artsakh residents expressed fear that Azerbaijan would eventually close the Lachin corridor and in 2021 unsuccessfully petitioned the Russian peacekeeping forces to reopen an alternative route. With the Vardenis–Martakert highway closed, Stepanakert is now a six-hour drive from the nearest accessible international airport in Yerevan, the capital city of Armenia. Meanwhile, Azerbaijan has built two new airports in Zangilan and Fuzuli, located in the Nagorno-Karabakh region, since Artsakh forces surrendered them in 2020.

In September 2021, following increased tension with Iran, Azerbaijan accused Iranian drivers of delivering supplies to Artsakh and later arrested two drivers for "illegally" entering Azerbaijan.

In February 2022, Aliyev and Putin signed a "Declaration of Allied Interaction" which elevated ties between their countries on the basis of "mutual respect for ... territorial integrity and inviolability of the borders of the two countries." The agreement also obliges Azerbaijan and Russia to "refrain from any actions, including those carried out through third states, directed against each other."

In August 2022, Azerbaijani forces took control of territory within and around the Lachin District, excluding the five km-wide Lachin corridor, which at the time was controlled by Russian peacekeepers. As part of the ceasefire agreement, parts of the highway were moved to avoid the cities of Lachin and Shusha, but still to be controlled by Russian peacekeeping forces. Artsakh authorities gave the residents of the villages along the corridor 20 days notice to evacuate. While Aliyev promised that long-term Armenian Lachin residents would be treated as citizens, he branded the remaining residents as "illegal settlers" and demanded that they be removed. Several analysts consider it unlikely that Azerbaijan will allow electricity, gas, and Internet infrastructure which currently exists along the Lachin corridor to be built along the new highway.

=== Prelude ===
In December 2022, the Azerbaijan government inaugurated its "Great Return" program, which ostensibly promotes the settlement of ethnic Azerbaijanis who once lived in Armenia and Nagorno-Karabakh. As part of this program, a natural gas pipeline will be built between Agdam and Stapanakert and begin operation in 2025, which is also when the Russian peacekeeping forces' mandate in Nagorno-Karabakh ends.

Azerbaijan has drawn parallels between the Lachin corridor and the "Zangezur corridor," a concept for an extraterritorial corridor through Armenia which Azerbaijan claims was part of the 2020 ceasefire agreement. Since the end of the Second Nagorno-Karabakh War, Azerbaijan has increasingly promoted irredentist claims to Armenian territory which it describes as "Western Azerbaijan" and has occupied sections of Armenia proper (distinct from Artsakh). Various analysts consider these actions, along with the blockade itself, to be a coercive bargaining strategy aimed at extorting Armenians to relinquish control of Artsakh and concede the Zangezur corridor.

Speaking about Azerbaijan's demand for the Zangezur corridor, a senior Azerbaijani official reported to Eurasianet in November 2022, "What if we were to install a [border] post at the entrance of Lachin and finish the whole process? How can you breathe with no air?" Two weeks before the ongoing blockade started, the prime minister of Armenia said at a cabinet meeting, "The President of Azerbaijan is trying to create fictitious grounds for closing the Lachin Corridor, encircling the Armenians of Nagorno-Karabakh, and subjecting them to genocide and deportation under the pretext that Armenia is not fulfilling its obligations."

== Blockade timeline ==
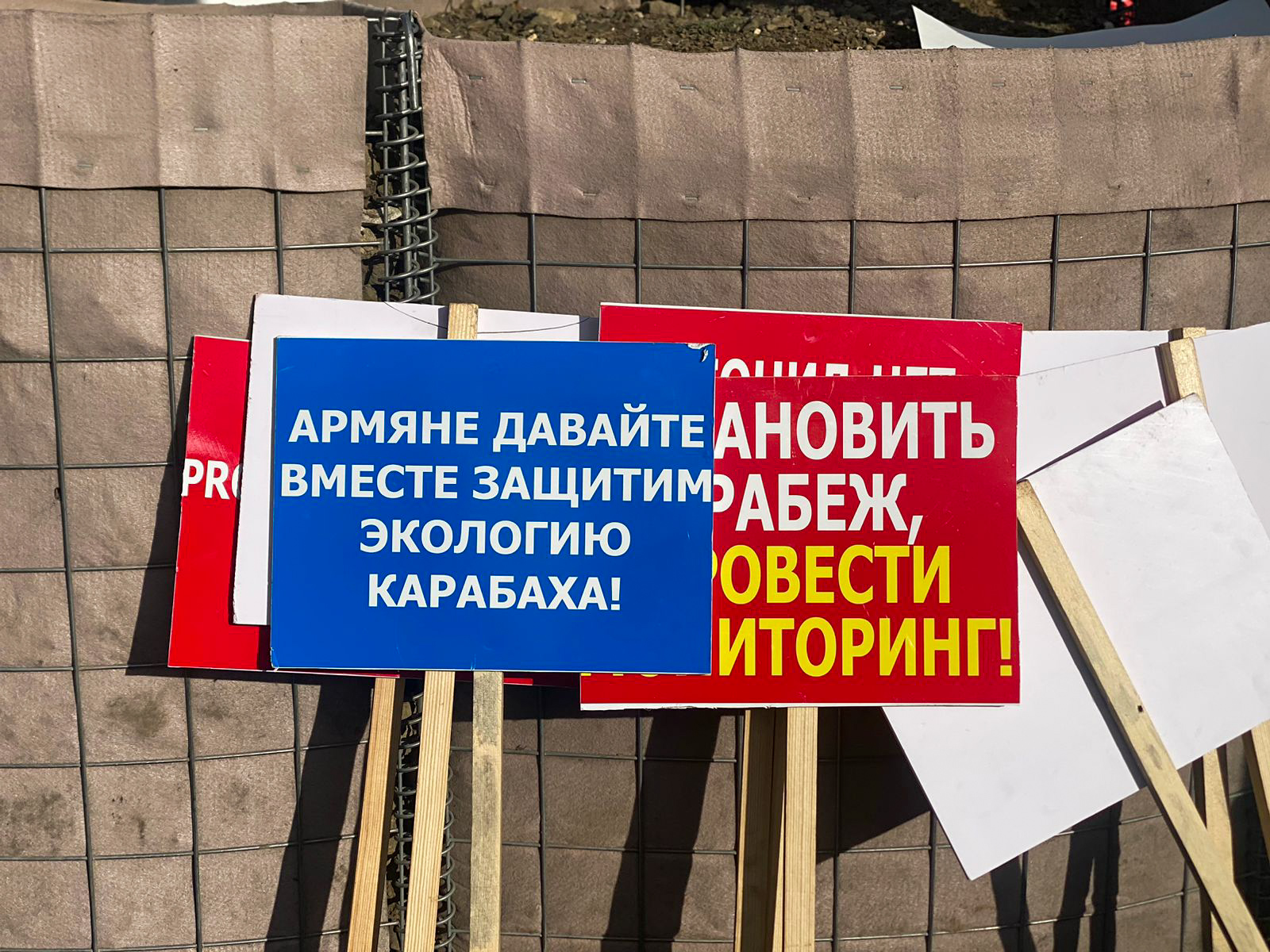
Russian-language signs used by eco-activists during the blockade

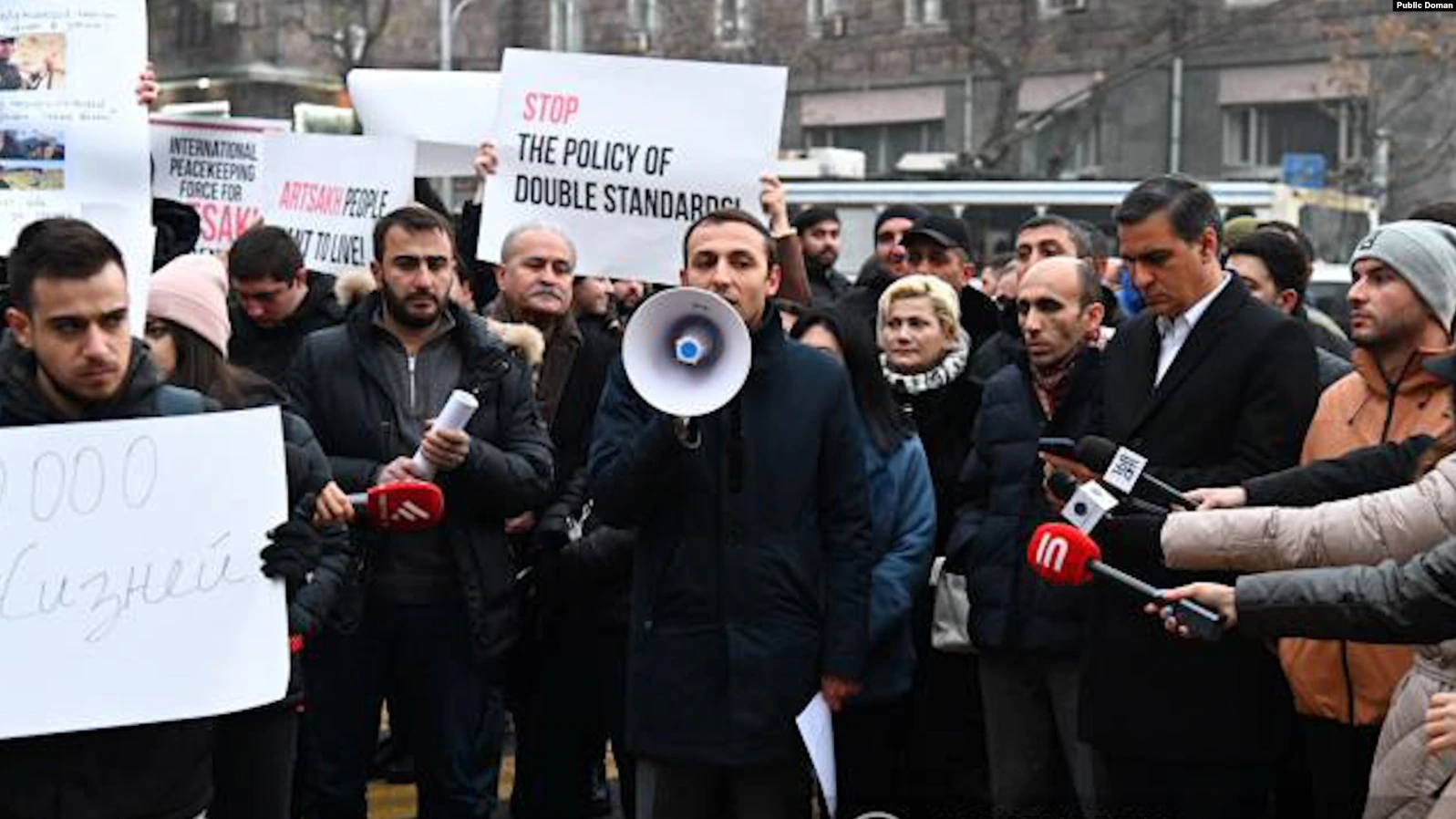
Armenians protesting in front of the UN office in Yerevan

=== 2022 events ===
3 December – Artsakh information headquarters reported that a group of Azerbaijanis blocked the Lachin corridor between Stepanakert and Goris at the intersection around Shusha–Dashalty. The road was later reopened after being closed for four hours, but Azerbaijan announced that it would send specialists to the location of the Russian peacekeepers.

10 December – the Ministries of Economy and Environmental Protection and Natural Resources of Azerbaijan issued a joint statement indicating that they would be initiating environmental monitoring in the territory of the Republic of Artsakh. On the same day, a group of Azerbaijanis tried to enter the Kashen mine, but the mine's security staff did not allow it.

12 December – a group of Azerbaijanis calling themselves environmentalists blocked the Lachin corridor. According to the group, they are protesting the "illegal exploitation" of mineral deposits in the region. The participants placed tents in the middle of the road. According to Azerbaijani media, environmental groups protested after being denied access to the Drmbon and Kashin mines and demanded a meeting with the commander of the Russian peacekeepers at the time, Andrei Volkov. Human Rights Watch reported that Russian peacekeeping forces also barricaded the road to prevent further escalation of the situation if the participants were to advance to the mines in Artsakh.

13–16 December – Azerbaijan cut off the gas supply from Armenia to Artsakh. The Azerbaijani gas supply agency Azeriqaz denied involvement. On the evening of 13 December Azerbaijani media reported that Internal Troops of the Ministry of Internal Affairs of Azerbaijan and the police arrived to the area of the protests to "ensure the security of the participants of the action".

14 December – Azerbaijani authorities claimed that it was the Russian peacekeeping forces which were blockading the corridor.

16 December – the alleged "ecoactivists" added to their list of demands "restoration of control by all state structures of Azerbaijan, including the Ministry of Internal Affairs, the State Border Service, and the State Customs Committee" along the Lachin corridor. One of the Azerbaijani self-described protesters Dilara Efendiyeva created a hotline to appeal for assistance in crossing the blockade; however, this has been dismissed as ingenuine or propaganda by many Armenians. On the same day, 40,000–70,000 Artsakh residents rallied in the capital Stepanakert in protest of the blockade, making it one of the largest protests in Nagorno-Karabakh since the 1988 Karabakh movement.

26 December – Armenia's Security Council secretary Armen Grigoryan stated that "Armenia is being forced to provide an extraterritorial corridor [referring to the Zangezur Corridor] and join the Union State," a view which Moscow later denied. This perception was echoed by other Armenian politicians and political analysts who claimed that Russia was using the blockade to obtain concessions from Armenia.

27 December – Azerbaijan specified that the blockade would be lifted if state monitors were permitted entry into the mining sites used by Artsakh.

28 December – Artsakh authorities halted mining operations at Kashen, pending an "international ecological examination" to disprove Azerbaijani claims of environmental damage. The Kashen mine, operated by Base Metals, is Artsakh's largest corporate taxpayer and private employer.

29 December – the Armenian prime minister criticized the Russian peacekeeping forces for not maintaining open transport in and out of Artsakh and suggested the role be delegated to a United Nations peacekeeping mission, a suggestion that Azerbaijan rejected.

31 December – efforts to get the United Nations Security Council to issue a joint statement on the blockade were not successful. The exact reason was unknown, with responsibility being variously attributed to Azerbaijan, France, and Russia: however, Azerbaijan's ambassador to Belgium and the European Union, Vaqif Sadiqov, credited additional parties for not approving the resolution: "Words of gratitude go to Albania, Russia, UAE & UK! A great job of AZ diplomats!" he wrote in a tweet.

=== 2023 events ===
5 January – the parliament of Artsakh called on the US, France and Russia to take action to open the corridor or begin the operation of an airlift to Stepanakert's airport to prevent an "urgent humanitarian crisis". Artsakh's state minister, Ruben Vardanyan, said "Pressure from international organizations, European countries and the United States would have great significance. The only solution which will allow us to live normally in this situation in the winter months is the possibility of opening an air bridge."

8 January – authorities in Artsakh announced that kindergartens and schools with extended hours will be shut down indefinitely beginning on 9 January due to shortages caused by the blockade.

9 January – Artsakh announced that coupons would be issued to people in order to purchase scarce supplies. The government issued a rationing system to commence on 20 January of buckwheat, rice, sugar, pasta and cooking oil.

10 January – Armenian prime minister Pashinyan denied claims that Moscow had pressured Armenia to join the Union State of Russian and Belarus but said "the reality isn't as simple as it seems. Sometimes, it's not the text but the subtext that needs to be considered." On the same day, Ilham Aliyev, the President of Azerbaijan, in a press conference talking about Lachin corridor stated that: "whoever does not want to become our citizen, the road is not closed, it is open. They can leave, they can go by themselves, no-one will hinder them."

10 January – the electricity operator of Artsakh reported that the high-voltage power line supplying electricity to Artsakh from Armenia was damaged on the Aghavno-Berdzor section of the corridor under Azerbaijani control and that Azerbaijan is hindering restoration works on the line. In addition, the Armenian Prime Minister announced that the planned CSTO military exercises would not be held in Armenia due to the situation, while Moscow downplayed Armenia's refusal to host the alliance.

12 January – there were widespread Internet outages in Artsakh that lasted an hour and caused fear among local residents. In a Stepanakert-Yerevan online conference, then State Minister Vardanyan stated "We have three choices: to become citizens of Azerbaijan, to leave, or to overcome this situation. This is the struggle for life, we must do everything in our power."

17 January – Artsakh's InfoCenter reported that the only gas pipeline delivering gas to Artsakh from Armenia was interrupted again.

18 January – Artsakh's ombudsman reported that Azerbaijanis halted a car escorted by Russian peacekeepers that was carrying children returning to Stepanakert. The Azerbaijanis broke into the car while filming the incident, causing a commotion with one of the children fainting.

19 January – the European Parliament adopted a resolution condemning the blockade, describing it as a humanitarian crisis and a violation of the 2020 ceasefire declaration. It also called for Azerbaijan to "protect the rights of Armenians living in Nagorno-Karabakh and refrain from its inflammatory rhetoric that calls for discrimination against Armenians and urges Armenians to leave Nagorno-Karabakh." The resolution also "condemns the inaction of Russian 'peacekeepers'; considers that their replacement with OSCE international peacekeepers, under a UN mandate, should be negotiated urgently"

8 February – the Russian Foreign Ministry rejected suggestions that EU or UN peacekeepers could be brought in.

18 February – a panel discussion was held on the sidelines of the 2023 Munich Security Conference. The Prime Minister of Armenia Pashinyan discussed the humanitarian consequences of Azerbaijan's blockade. The live streaming broadcast was interrupted on various official Azeri state media channels right after Pashinyan talked about how the elections in Armenia after the second Nagorno-Karabakh War were held in a democratic and free competitive environment.

22 February – the International Court of Justice ordered that Azerbaijan take all measures at its disposal to ensure unimpeded movement of persons, vehicles and cargo along the Lachin Corridor in both directions.

13 March – the former Prime Minister of Denmark and NATO Secretary General, Anders Fogh Rasmussen, visited the Lachin corridor stated that the Azerbaijani government is backing the blockade while using the pretext of an environmental protest. He proposed European and American military support to Armenia as an emerging democracy "to prevent another significant conflict or even ethnic cleansing in the our [the West's] backyard."

25 March – in violation of the ceasefire agreement, Azerbaijani forces occupied new positions in Nagorno-Karabakh and closed an alternative dirt road that certain Armenians were using to bypass the blockade at the Lachin corridor. Azerbaijan ignored calls from the Russian peacekeepers for Azeri forces to return to their original positions.

29 March – Laurent Wauquiez, the president of the Auvergne-Rhône-Alpes Regional Council of France, visited the Lachin corridor as part of a French delegation to Armenia. He said the blockade marks the return of pan-Turkism to the 21st century. Wauquiez said he intends to send a blockade-busting humanitarian convoy to Nagorno-Karabakh, as a joint initiative by his region of Auvergne-Rhone-Alpes and the Armenian community of France.

30 March – Azerbaijani forces seized land in internationally recognized Armenia around the new southern section of the Lachin road leading from the villages of Tegh and Kornidzor towards Artsakh. Azerbaijani forces also blocked the old sections of the Lachin corridor.

23 April – in violation of the ceasefire agreement, Azerbaijani forces installed a military checkpoint at the Lachin corridor, at the Hakari/Kornidzor bridge next to a Russian peacekeeping base, a move that drew concerns and criticism from the Russian Federation, PACE, the United States, France, UK, and Canada. Video footage showed Russian peacekeepers not intervening as construction of the Azerbaijani military checkpoint was underway.

28 April – the alleged "eco-protestors" suspended their action, following a meeting with Aydin Karimov, a special representative of the Azerbaijani president, who asked them to disperse. Pro-government Azerbaijani state media reported that the activists were "very happy with the establishment of a border control mechanism" by the Azerbaijani government.

15 June – Azerbaijani forces crossed the Hakari bridge and attempted to raise an Azerbaijani flag but were repelled by the Armenian border guards who opened fire. After the incident, Azerbaijan blocked all passage through the Lachin corridor, including humanitarian convoys from the Red Cross and Russian peacekeepers. Video footage showed Azerbaijani forces placing concrete road blocks on the bridge.

26 July – Azerbaijan blocked an emergency food convoy of 19 trucks (400 tons) sent to Artsakh and called it a "provocation."

1 August – Reports emerged of Azerbaijani forces abducting Artsakh citizens, with two incidents being confirmed: Azerbaijani forces detained a 65-year-old Artsakh patient who was being transported by the Red Cross. Azerbaijan alleged that the man was guilty of "war crimes" and that an international search warrant had been previously issued. Independent news outlet, Eurasianet said they could not find any evidence to substantiate Azerbaijan's claim. Another 55-year-old man was detained at the military checkpoint for "illegally" crossing into Armenia.

== Humanitarian crisis ==
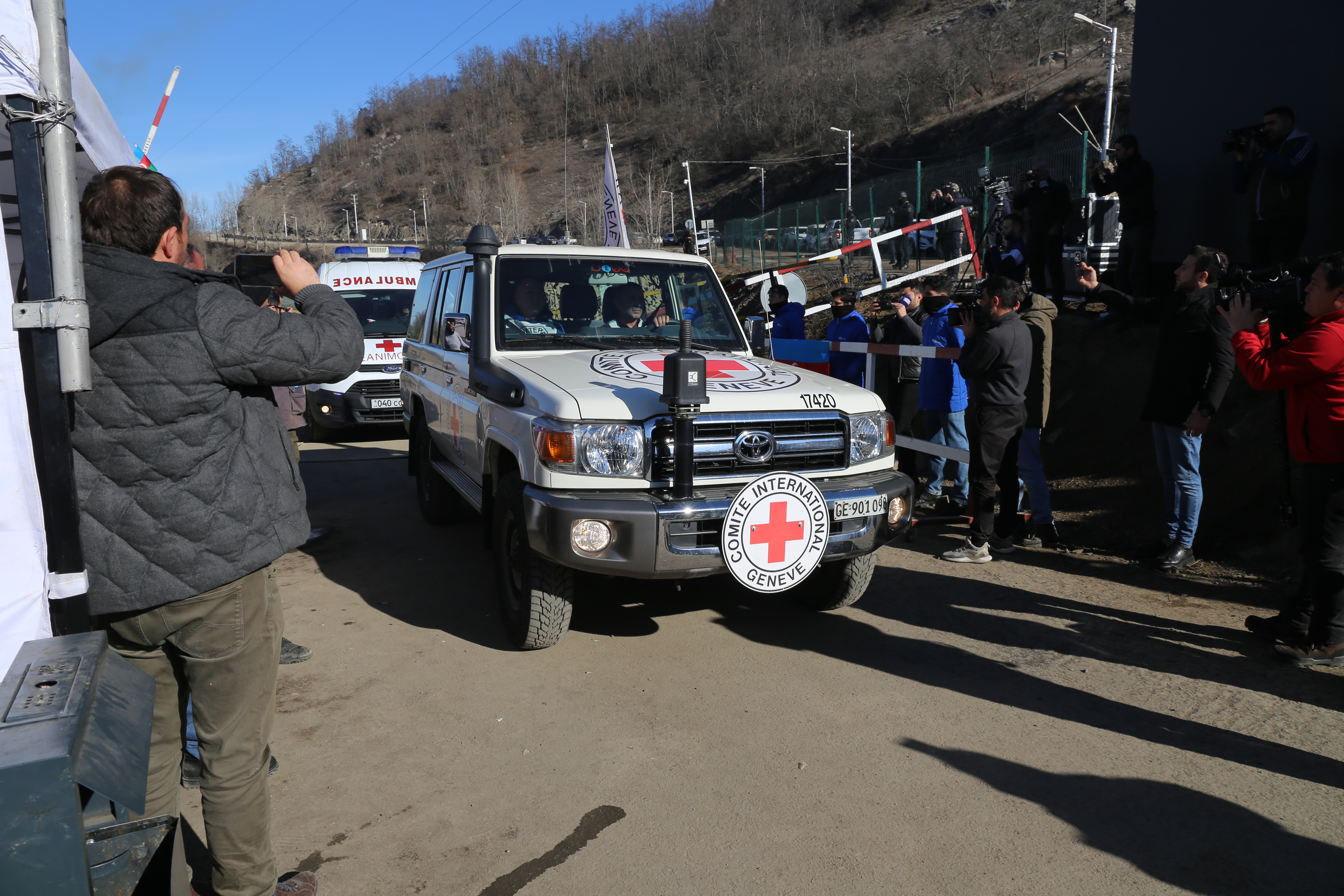
ICRC vehicle facilitating the transfer of a patient in need of urgent medical assistance across the Lachin road to Armenia.

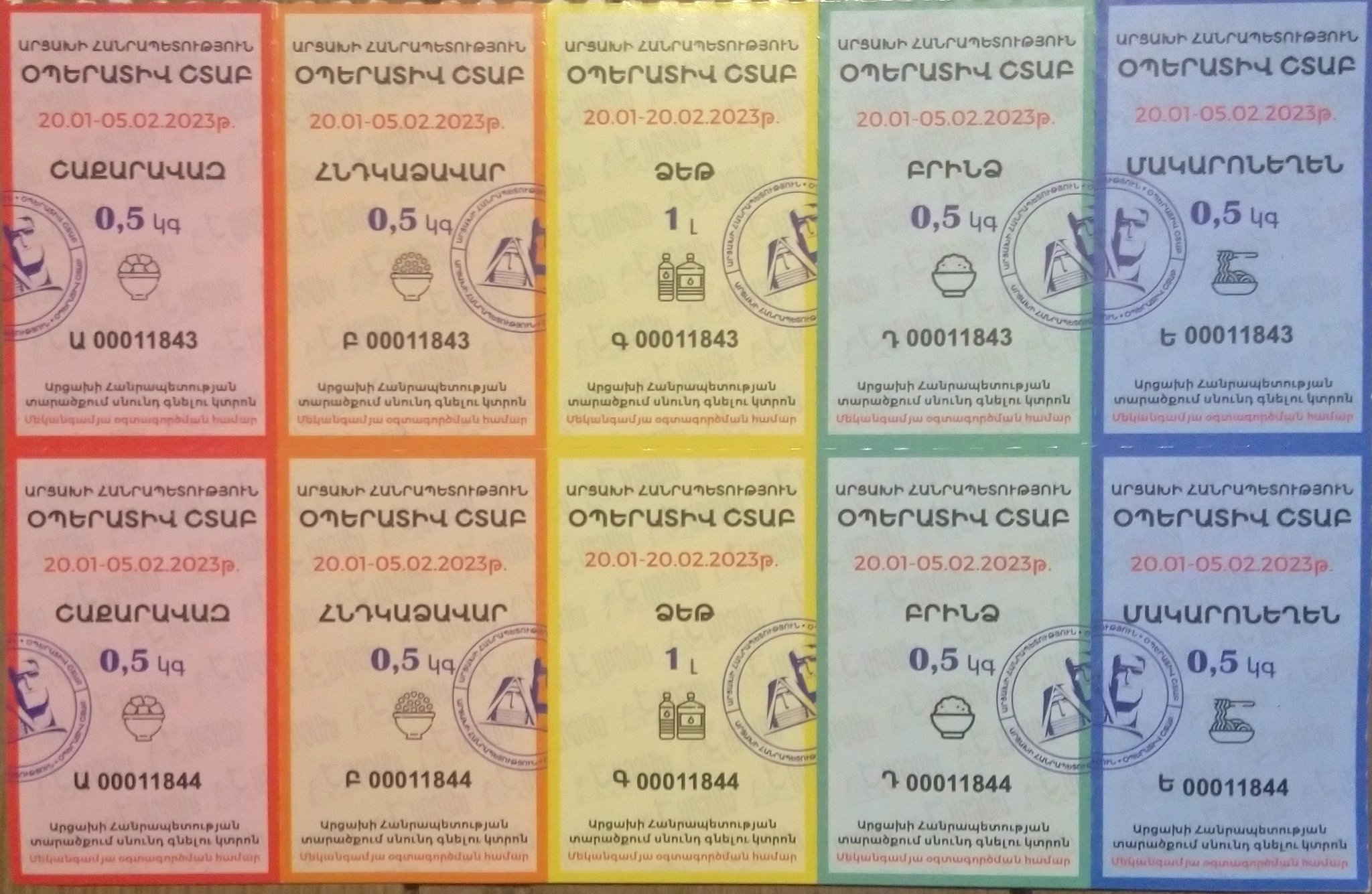
Ration stamps for sugar, buckwheat, vegetable oil, rice and pasta, provided by Artsakh Government in January 2023.

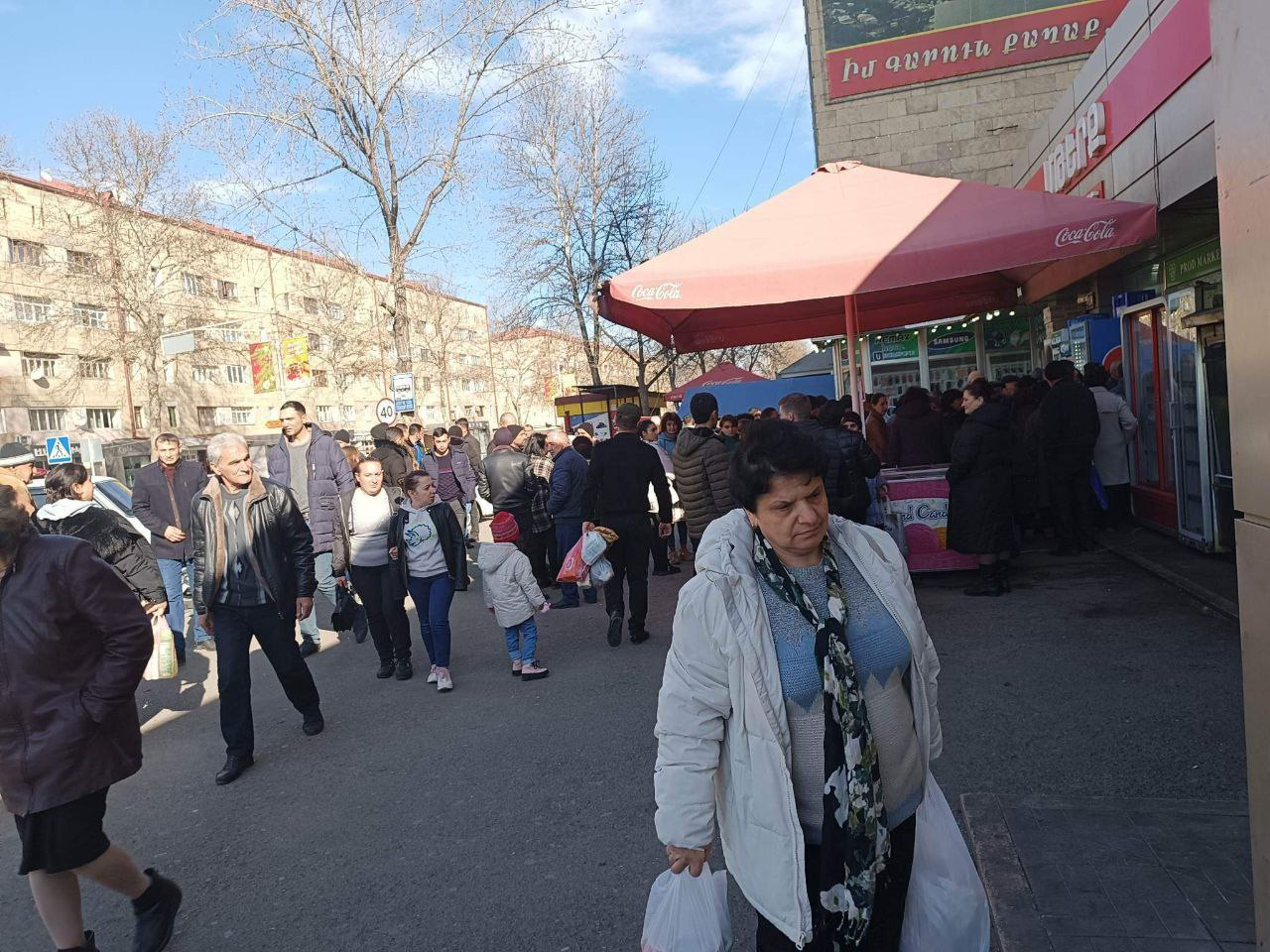
Food queue in Stepanakert

The blockade is creating a humanitarian crisis due to the Republic of Artsakh losing regular supplies of food, fuel and medicine; before the blockade, the territory received 400 tons of food and medicine daily. During the blockade, Azerbaijan has deliberately damaged or cut various critical civilian infrastructure which supplies Artsakh: including gas, electricity, and Internet. Artsakh officials also have reported that Azerbaijan's disruption of power and gas supplies has created long-term environmental issues due to the depletion of water reservoirs and the unplanned deforestation of thousands of trees.

Artsakh has been without gas supply since 22 March 2023 (3 years and 8 months).

On the night that the blockade began (12 December), more than 1,100 Artsakh citizens were stranded on the roads in cold winter conditions. Among the stranded citizens are 270 children, many of whom were returning from attending the Junior Eurovision Song Contest 2022 in Yerevan; they have been grounded in Armenian territory and are unable to return home. Hundreds of families have been divided. Schools and other educational institutions have been suspended. Among the 120,000 people blockaded are 30,000 children, 20,000 elderly, and 9,000 disabled people.

Local Artsakh farmers are also scared of farming since Azerbaijani forces have been routinely firing at workers in their fields, and those that do have trouble transporting their goods because of the acute fuel shortages.

=== Lack of access to supplies and medical care ===
Shortages of food, fuel, and medicine are widespread, and emergency reserves are being rationed. Most residents have just one meal a day, often consisting only of a couple pieces of bread. David Ignatius, a journalist for the Washington Post, says that US officials believe people are only surviving because of their backyard gardens which will not be sustainable in winter.

Being the only road to the outside world and to Armenia, Artsakh residents depend on the Lachin corridor for supplies of food, medicine, fuel and other essential goods. Before the blockade, the region received 400 tons of food and medicine from Armenia daily. There is massive unemployment: Nearly one fifth of all businesses in Artsakh have suspended operations due to the blockade. Miscarriages have also tripled due to malnutrition and stress.

Several isolated communities along the corridor to the west of the road blockade have been cut off from both Armenia and the rest of Artsakh, rendering them completely isolated: Mets Shen, Hin Shen, Yeghtsahogh, and Lisagor. It has become impossible to deliver food and other basic necessities to these communities from either Armenia or the rest of Artsakh.

On 20 January, Artsakh authorities announced a coupon-based food rationing system that allocates one kilogram of pasta, buckwheat, rice, and sugar and a litre of cooking oil per month. By 4 July 2023, it was announced that oil and sugar rations would be provided only to families with underage children.

A BBC News article from 6 January stated that the only product left for sale at the main market was dried thyme, that shop shelves were empty in all of Stepanakert, and that all basic medication had run out, even at the hospital. The stress, poor nutrition, and lack of medication has caused an increase in miscarriages and premature births.

The transfer of critically ill patients from Artsakh to Yerevan remains nearly impossible, with one death resulting from the situation. Hospitals in Artsakh report that all non-essential surgeries have been postponed.

==== Limited supplies transported by the Red Cross and the Russian peacekeepers ====
Since 12 December 2022, only vehicles belonging to the International Committee of the Red Cross (ICRC) and the Russian peacekeepers have been permitted to pass through the Lachin corridor. They have transported patients in need of medical care and provided limited humanitarian supplies. However, Azerbaijan has also blocked passage of the ICRC and the Russian peacekeepers on various occasions and for weeks at a time.

On 15 June 2023, Azerbaijan blocked all passage of food, fuel, and medicine from the Red Cross and the Russian peacekeepers through the Lachin corridor. Ten days later, Azerbaijan lifted the ban on Red Cross vehicles but banned their passage again on 11 July 2023. On 25 July 2023, the ICRC called on "the relevant decision makers" to allow the organization to resume its humanitarian operations.

Before Azerbaijan banned passage of the ICRC, the organization said that the military checkpoint had worsened its ability to carry out humanitarian operations, with each convoy from the ICRC requiring approval from Azerbaijan before it passes through.

The humanitarian aid delivered by the ICRC and the Russian peacekeepers is insufficient to meet demand.

The Red Cross has distributed food, medical supplies, and hygiene items across the corridor, including to eight hospitals, a physical rehabilitation center harboring 300 destitute elderly people, and a center supporting children from vulnerable families. Since December 2022, the Red Cross has reported evacuating 600 patients, and transferred 422 people across the Lachin Corridor to reunite separated families. The Red Cross also reported delivering 3,500 food and hygiene parcels between 1 January and 20 March 2023.

Between 22 January and 15 June 2023, Russian peacekeeping forces delivered humanitarian cargo, including food parcel and fuel, through the Lachin corridor. As the only supplier of fuel to the region, Azerbaijan's ban on the passage of Russian peacekeepers has created a severe fuel shortage and a prohibition on selling fuel. Artsakh locals and government officials also reported that the Russian peacekeepers had profited off the situation by charging several thousand dollars per vehicle of essential goods.

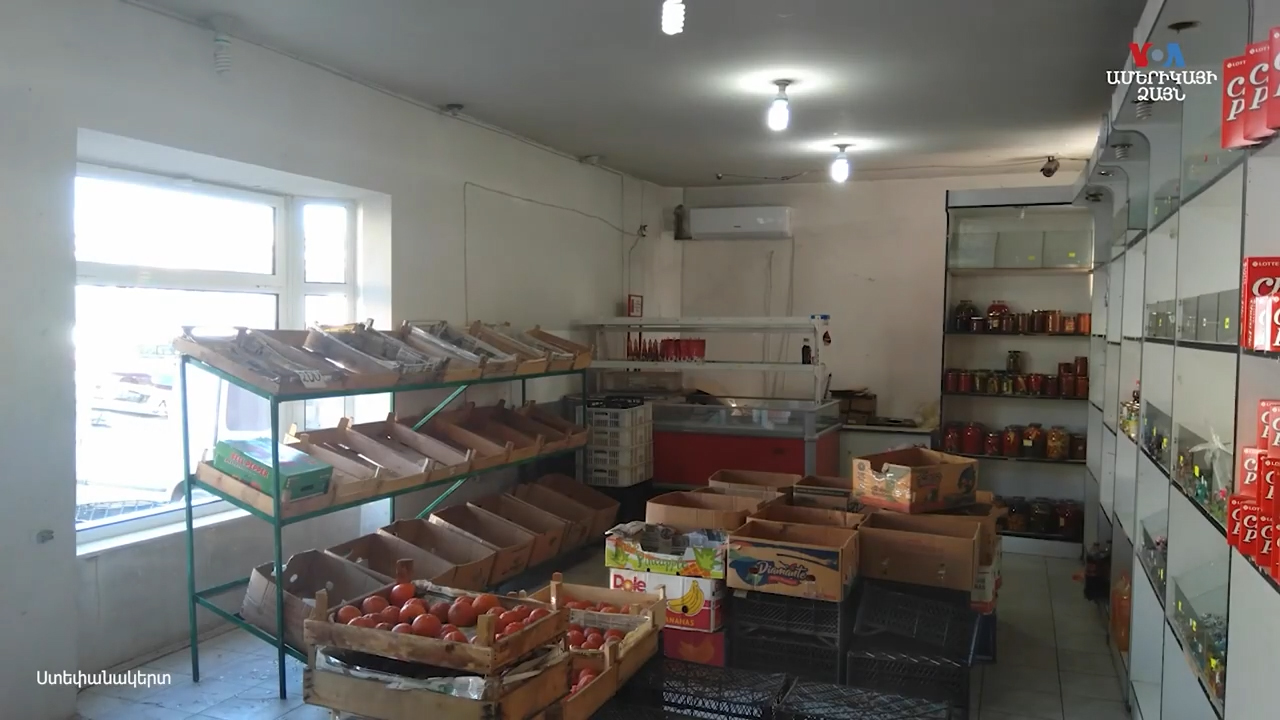

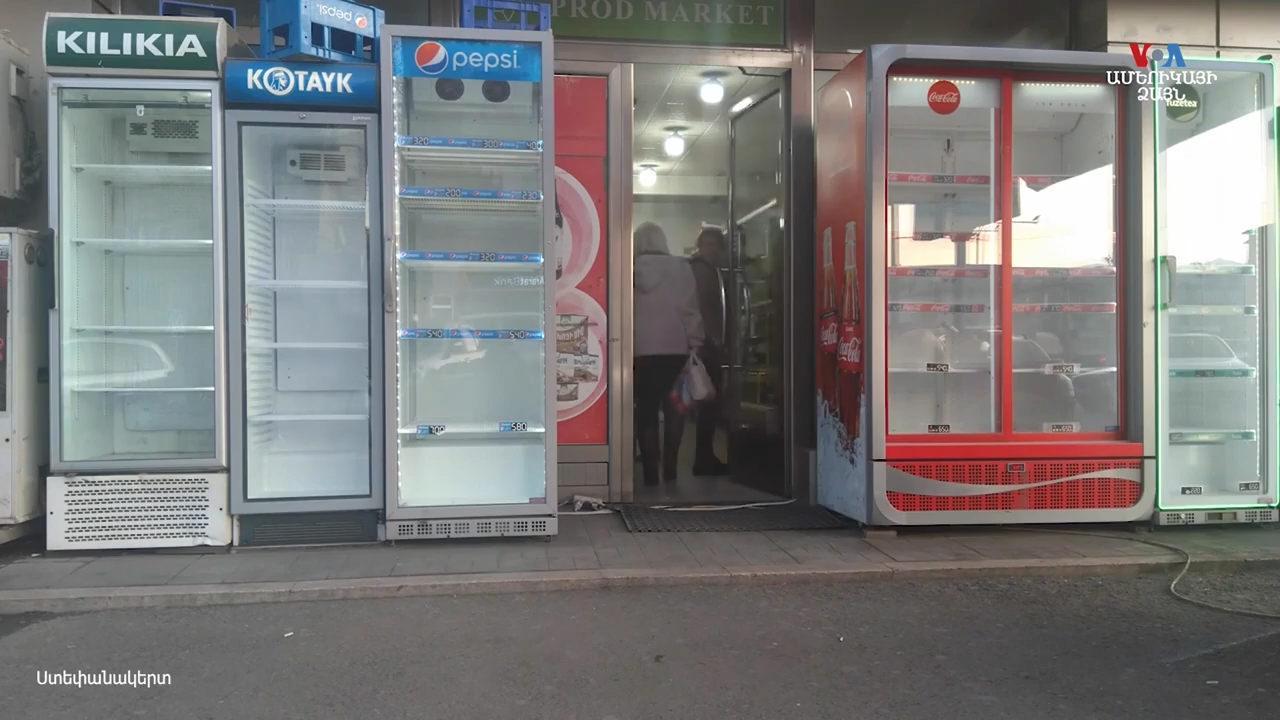
Empty grocery stores in Stepanakert during the blockade

=== Damage to infrastructure ===
During the blockade, Azerbaijan has sabotaged or cut various critical civilian infrastructure of Artsakh: including gas, electricity, and Internet. Artsakh has been without adequate electricity supply since 10 January 2023 (3 years, 10 months, 1 week and 5 days) and without gas supply since 22 March 2023 (3 years and 8 months).

Azerbaijan has cut the only gas supply to Artsakh numerous times; first between 13 and 16 December 2022, and again on 17 January, 28 January, 6 February, and 10 March 2023. Officials from the Parliamentary Council of Europe, Armenia, and Artsakh have said that Azerbaijan can disrupt the gas supply to Artsakh on demand by means of a control valve that Azerbaijan installed in March 2020 during repair works. A PACE report said that the observation that gas does not go beyond the village of Pekh indicates that a control valve was installed.

On 10 January, the only high-voltage power line from Armenia to Artsakh was damaged, with Azerbaijan preventing repair teams from accessing the damaged section. As a result, Artsakh authorities announced that daily blackouts would be instituted (lasting on average 6-hours) to ration the limited local hydroelectricity-production. Since then, Artsakh has been entirely dependent on its own hydrogeneration capacity; power plants have been operating at full capacity and their water reservoir levels are reaching critically low levels.

On 12 January, internet access in Artsakh was disrupted due to damage to the only broadband internet cables leading into the region, with Artsakh officials accusing Azerbaijan of deliberately severing the connection. The internet was restored after Armenian specialists repaired the damage the next day. Azerbaijan's cuts to the electricity supply have also interfered with Internet and telephone connections.

Public transportation has also completely shutdown due to Azerbaijan's interruption of the gas supply.

== Genocide risk factors ==
Human rights organizations, academics specializing in genocide studies, and politicians consider the blockade to be a form of ethnic cleansing and have warned of the risk of genocide. The founding prosecutor of the International Criminal Court, Luis Moreno Ocampo, describes the blockade as a genocide, under Article II, (c) of the Genocide Convention: "Deliberately inflicting on the group conditions of life calculated to bring about its physical destruction," adding that "President Aliyev has Genocidal intentions: he has knowingly, willingly and voluntarily blockaded the Lachin Corridor even after having been placed on notice regarding the consequences of his actions by the ICJ's [International Court of Justice] provisional orders."

A coalition of international observers wrote "All 14 risk factors for atrocity crimes identified by the UN Secretary-General's Office on Genocide Prevention are now present. “... The current Azerbaijani aggression against the Armenians of Nagorno-Karabakh conforms to a long pattern of ethnic and religious cleansing of Armenian and other Christian communities in the region by the government of Azerbaijan, the Republic of Turkey, the Ottoman Empire, and their partisans." Another group of genocide scholars at the 2022 Global Forum Against the Crime of Genocide declared: "we believe that the actions of the Azerbaijani government pose a threat of genocide to Armenians in the region." A group letter authored published in Le Monde described Artsakh as "an open-air prison, where, on a daily basis, the inhabitants lack everything."

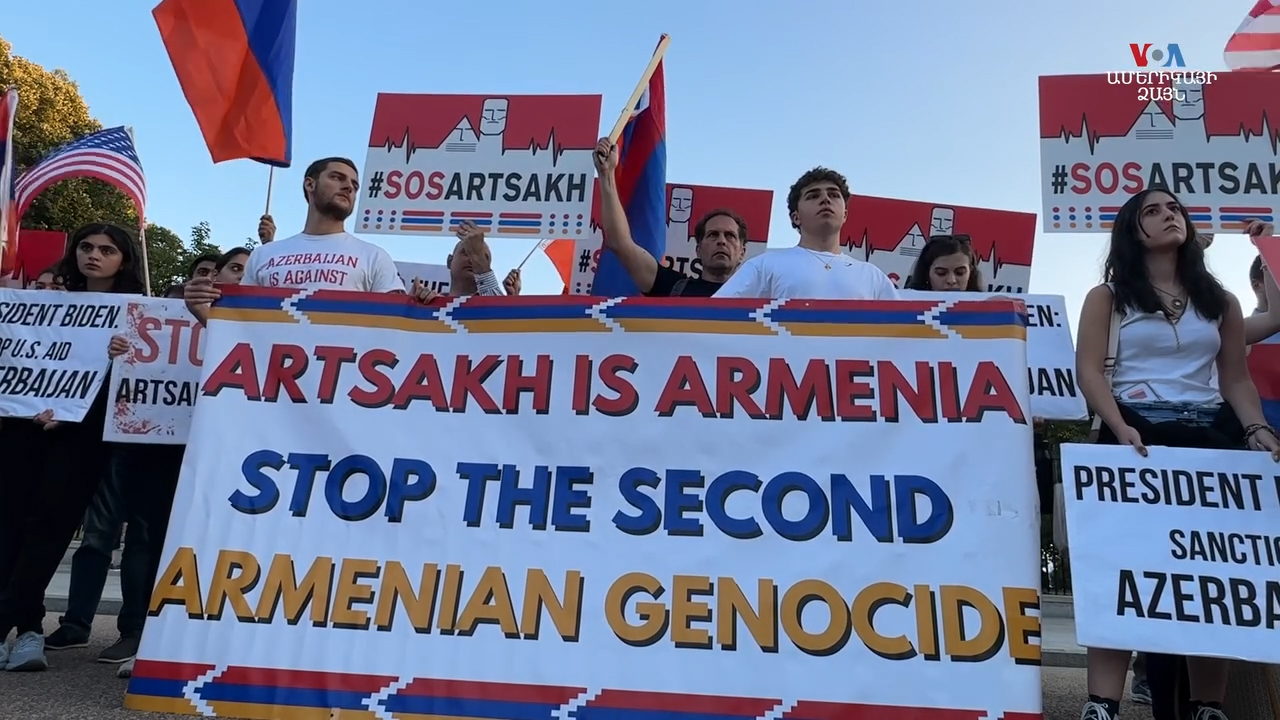
Armenians in Washington protest in front of the White House, 21 September 2023

Thomas de Waal, a senior fellow with Carnegie Europe, specialising in the Caucasus, says that "Armenians fear that this is a prelude to an Azerbaijani attempt to fully drive them all out of their homeland." Anders Fogh Rasmussen, former prime minister of Denmark and a NATO secretary general, wrote "All eyes are rightly fixated on Russia's war in Ukraine. But that is no excuse for ignoring another crisis that is brewing on Europe's doorstep. ... The intent [of the blockade], clearly, is to make life as difficult as possible for the Armenian population, and there is a serious risk of imminent ethnic cleansing. We must not divert our gaze from what is happening."

Many observers do not believe that Artsakh Armenians can live safely under President Aliyev's regime. Caucasus expert Laurence Broers draws parallels between "the Russian discourse about Ukraine as an artificial, fake nation, and the Azerbaijani discourse about Armenia, likewise claiming it has a fake history" which elevates the conflict to an "existential level." Broers also wrote "the blockade renders irrelevant any talk of the civil integration of Karabakh Armenians. It vindicates the worst fears of the Karabakh Armenian population." If Azerbaijan takes control over the region, political analysts predict that Azerbaijan will arbitrarily detain and torture civilians, under the pretext of their association with the Artsakh government or with previous wars.

Independent journalist Susan Korah wrote, "the international community, should seriously consider applying the principle of R2P [Responsibility to Protect] to stop ethnic cleansing in Artsakh." The Global Center for the Responsibility to Protect issued an "atrocity alert" in which it says Azerbaijan's "intentional and unlawful denial of humanitarian assistance may constitute war crimes and crimes against humanity." Political analysts and former US officials, Sam Brownback and Michael Rubin, describe the situation as "becoming the new Srebrenica [massacre]."

- The Lemkin Institute for Genocide Prevention issued several "Red Flag Alerts" on Azerbaijan since the blockade began, describing it as "a criminal act which intends to create terror and unbearable conditions of life for the population of Artsakh. These events are not isolated events; they are, instead, being committed within a larger genocidal pattern against Armenia and Armenians by the Azerbaijani regime." The group also wrote "The genocidal intent of Baku has never been clearer and the actions carried out up to the moment highly predict this outcome." The group wrote a letter to the EU council, warning that the European Union "is turning a blind eye to the Azerbaijani dictatorship for geopolitical and resource reasons" and that Azerbaijan's "intentions are clear: to wipe out all traces of Armenian life and of an Armenian presence in this region. Azerbaijani President, Ilham Aliyev, has consistently and repeatedly stated that he intends to eradicate the indigenous Armenians dwelling in Artsakh." The Lemkin Institute also wrote several letters warning EU and US officials that they will be complicit in genocide and should be tried in an international court if they broker a transfer of ethnic Armenians from Artsakh to Armenia proper. The Lemkin Institute said that sponsoring a transfer would constitute a violation of the right to self-determination and crime against humanity, and could fall within the crime of genocide, according to Article III(e) of the Genocide Convention. In August 2023, following news of Armenians in Artsakh dying of starvation, the Lemkin Institute issued an active genocide alert regarding the blockade.
- The International Association of Genocide Scholars condemned the blockade and Azerbaijan's "deliberate attacks on ... [Artsakh's] ... critical infrastructure." The group noted "significant genocide risk factors exist in the Nagorno-Karabakh situation concerning the Armenian population." The government of Azerbaijan, encouraged by its ally Turkey, has long promoted official hatred of Armenians, has fostered impunity for atrocities committed against Armenians, and has issued repeated threats to empty the region of its indigenous Armenian population."
- Genocide Watch issued an alert stating "Due to its unprovoked attacks and genocidal rhetoric against ethnic Armenians, Genocide Watch considers Azerbaijan's assault on Armenia and Artsakh to be at Stage 4: Dehumanization, Stage 7: Preparation, Stage 8: Persecution, and Stage 10: Denial." The group described the blockade as “a clear attempt by the Azerbaijani government to starve, freeze, and ultimately expel Armenians from Nagorno-Karabakh."
- A group of scholars wrote an open letter to the UN Secretary-General António Guterres, the UN High Commissioner for Human Rights Volker Türk, the Special Adviser of the UN Secretary-General on the Prevention of Genocide Alice Wairimu Nderitu, and to the Member States of the UN Security Council regarding the potential for genocide in Artsakh (Nagorno-Karabakh) on 9 August 2023. In the open letter they "call upon the United Nations to activate its early warning mechanism, as stipulated within its mandates, to expeditiously address the tangible and imminent threat of genocide in Artsakh".

Historian Elyse Semerdjian highlights similarities between Azerbaijan's attack on Nagorno-Karabakh and Israel's attack on Gaza, saying that both employ tools of "genocidal warfare", namely aerial bombardment and starvation.

== Inaction of the Russian peacekeepers ==
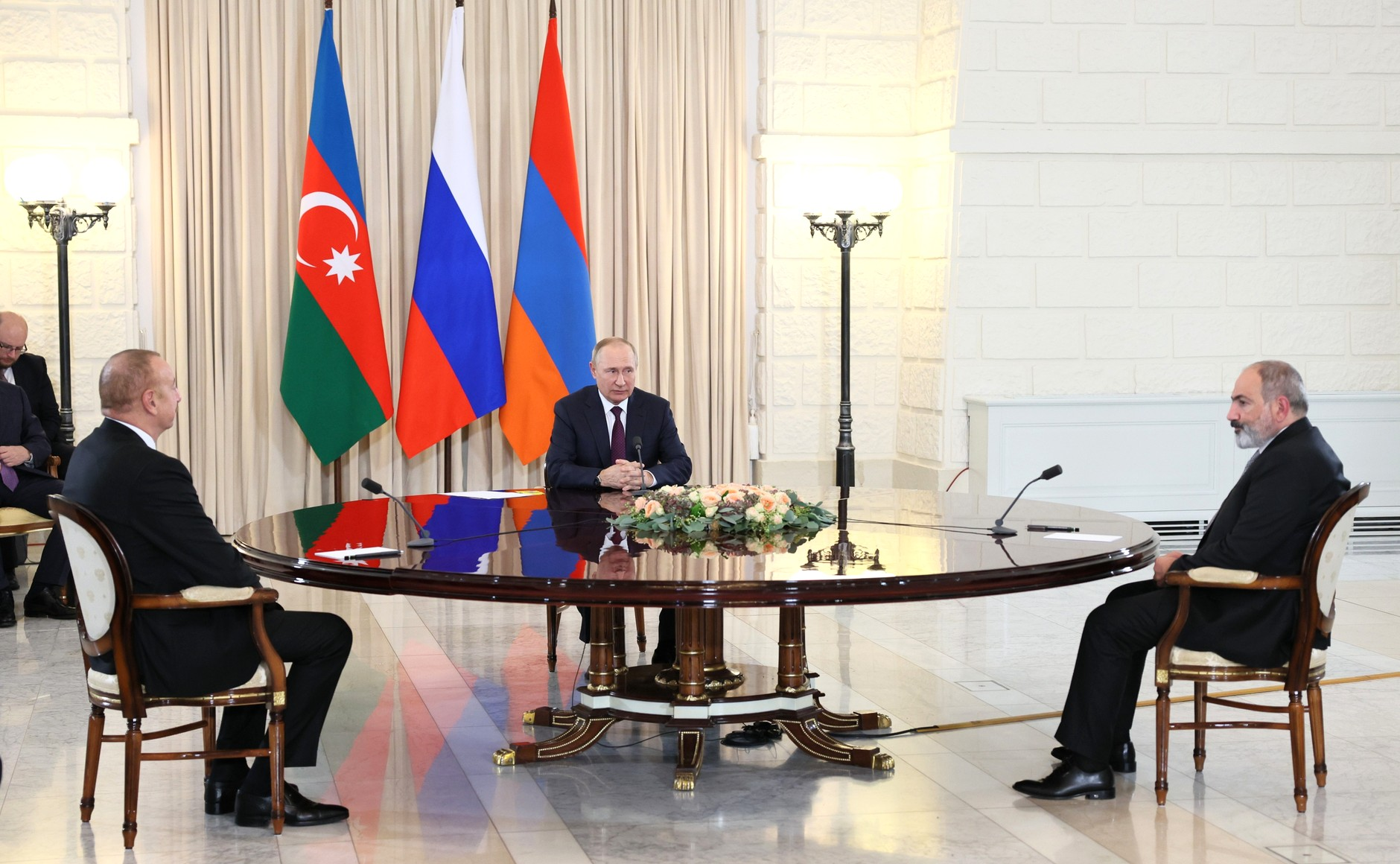
Russian President Vladimir Putin at the trilateral talks with Armenian Prime Minister Nikol Pashinyan and Azerbaijan's President Ilham Aliyev in Sochi, Russia, 31 October 2022

Observers accused the Russian peacekeepers of not fulfilling their mandate to protect free passage through the Lachin corridor. The peacekeepers witnessed but did not intervene as Azerbaijan installed its military checkpoint within meters of their position. The peacekeepers also did not escort the 400 tons of emergency aid that were blocked by Azerbaijan on 26 July 2023., or intervene when Azerbaijan kidnapped three Artsakh students from a Russian-organized peacekeeping convoy that passed through the Lachin corridor.

Nerses Kopalyan, a political scientist, wrote that "The Russian peacekeepers function more like an impotent observation mission than an armed contingent." Armenian prime minister Pashinyan has described the peacekeeping force a "silent witness to the depopulation of Nagorno-Karabakh." Bedross Der Matossian, scholar in middle east history, describes the Russian peacekeepers as "inept" and compares them to the Belgian and Dutch peacepeekers before the Rwandan and Srebrenica genocides.

Azerbaijan has indicated that it plans to end the peacekeeping mission by 2025, whereas the president of Artsakh, Harutyunyan, has said that he would like the peacekeepers to remain in the region permanently. Analysts predict a new conflict to emerge in 2025 when the peacekeepers' mission comes up for renewal. According to International Crisis Group, the Russian peacekeeping mission is too small to enforce the ceasefire conditions and protect civilians throughout Artsakh. Azerbaijan has also refused to agree on a clear definition of the peacekeeper's mandate, which analysts have said have contributed to their inaction.

Many countries, supranational entities, and human rights observers have criticised the inaction of the Russian peacekeepers and proposed they be replaced with peacekeepers from the UN, OSCE, or EU.

Earlier in the blockade, before Azerbaijan barred their passage through the Lachin corridor, the Russian peacekeepers were criticised for profiting off the blockade by charging locals several thousand dollars per vehicle of essential goods. Artsakh locals are also frustrated with the fact that the Russian peacekeepers are free to transport supplies for themselves via helicopter, while actual residents of the region face a scarcity of supplies and public transportation.

Certain analysts have put the inaction of the peacekeepers in Artsakh within the larger trend of Russia increasingly failing to assist Armenia in general. Despite officially being Armenia's security guarantor, Russia did not intervene during Azerbaijan's September 2022 attacks on Armenia and following Azerbaijan's occupation of Armenian territory (both distinct from Nagorno-Karabakh). Certain analysts and have said that Russia's invasion of Ukraine, or Russia's economic interests in Azerbaijani oil may be contributing to the inaction of the peacekeepers.

== Proposed solutions ==
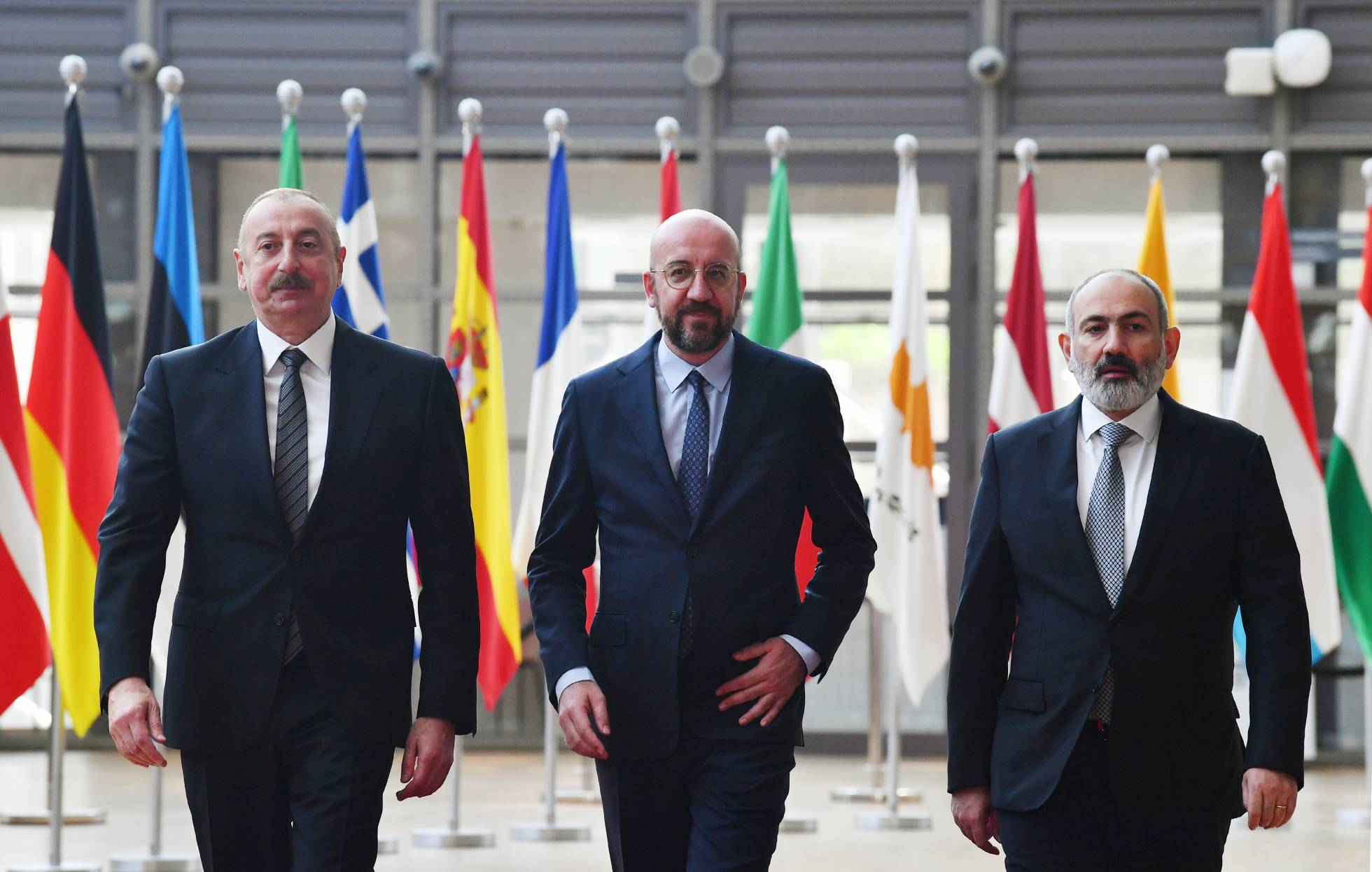
Nikol Pashinyan, Ilham Aliyev and President of the European Council Charles Michel in Brussels, 14 May 2023

Various solutions have been proposed to either pressure Azerbaijan to end its blockade or to provide humanitarian relief to the struggling Armenian population.

Initially, Azerbaijan used false environmentalist narratives as a guise to justify its blockade and it demanded the entry of environmental monitors as a condition to lift the blockade. Artsakh officials proposed the involvement of international environmental inspectors as a solution to dispel the allegation of that environmental standards were being violated; however, Azerbaijani officials consistently refuse to communicate with the Artsakh government.

Officials from Russia and the EU suggested that X-ray scanners or other "technical means" could be used to dispel allegations that the Lachin corridor was being used for military purposes, despite the fact that the ceasefire agreement does not limit the use of the road to humanitarian needs. In March 2023, Artsakh government officials approved the idea, provided that the X-ray machines would be controlled by the Russian peacekeepers. Azerbaijan, instead, unilaterally installed a military checkpoint in violation of the ceasefire agreement with American-made Smiths Detection X-ray scanners.

Other solutions that have been proposed include a humanitarian air-corridor that is reminiscent of the Berlin airlift and a land-based blockade-busting humanitarian convey. Officials from the EU, PACE, and Armenia have suggested that the Russian peacekeepers be replaced with international peacekeepers, a proposal which Russia and Azerbaijan have rejected.

The former Prime Minister of Denmark and NATO Secretary General, Anders Fogh Rasmussen, proposed European and American military support to Armenia as an emerging democracy to deter a large-scale conflict and/or ethnic cleansing in Artsakh.

The application of economic and Magnitsky sanctions against Azerbaijan has also been proposed by US and EU officials, as well as by political analysts, academics, and human rights organizations. Political analysts and former US officials, Sam Brownback and Michael Rubin, say that the US should also enforce the Humanitarian Corridors Act, which prevents the US from providing assistance to countries that restrict the transport of humanitarian aid. Genocide Watch and the Lemkin Institute for Genocide Prevention named several Western entities which should halt military and economic support to Azerbaijan: including NATO, the EU, US, Canada, Israel, and Ukraine. Genocide Watch and the Lemkin Institute also proposed that the US re-institute the 907 Freedom Support Act which was waived by the Biden administration that had previously banned US military assistance to Azerbaijan. EU officials and genocide scholars have emphasized self-determination, both as a human right internationally recognized and as a form of genocide prevention, given the extreme Armenophobia within Azerbaijan.

Armenian officials have proposed a demilitarized zone around Artsakh with an "international presence" that guarantees the safety and rights of the ethnic Armenian population. The Artsakh government has appealed to UN members to recognize the region's independence according to "remedial secession," a legal concept employed to justify Kosovo's independence from Serbia. According to the principle of remedial secession, a group of people can unilaterally secede in order to protect themselves from the parent state's oppressive regime.

Azerbaijani President Aliyev said that he will not yield to international pressure, commenting "Nobody can influence us." He also said that Artsakh residents will not receive any special status or autonomy and must be "reintegrated" as "normal citizen[s] of Azerbaijan" and threatened military action if the Artsakh government does not disband.

== Authenticity of the "environmental activism" claims ==
The authenticity of the "environmental activism" of the blockade participants between 12 December 2022 and 28 April 2023 was scrutinised and condemned by many countries, international organisations, and political analysts. It is widely suspected that the eco-protest component of the blockade was orchestrated by the Azerbaijani government. There is little evidence to suggest that there was a specific environmental issue within Artsakh that justified the protests. The Azerbaijani government has since formalised its blockade by shutting down an alternate dirt-path that was being used by people to try and bypass the blockade and by installing a military checkpoint at the Lachin corridor on 22 April 2023.

Critics argued that the Azerbaijani government was linked to the eco-protest: emphasizing that many of the protesters had government connections, were government-sponsored, the protest occurred in an area that is officially prohibited to the public and to independent journalists, and Azerbaijani authorities usually shut down spontaneous protests. The foreign minister of Azerbaijan, Jeyhun Bayramov also said that the demands of the eco-protesters needed to be met in order to lift the blockade. The alleged activists suspended their action following the installation of a military checkpoint to Artsakh and after a meeting with Aydin Karimov—a special representative of the Azerbaijani president—who asked them to disperse.

Azerbaijan also paid public relations firms to produce expert-signed op-eds which recited Azerbaijani propaganda that environmental concerns motivated the blockade. The motivations of the eco-activists was scrutinized, with critics saying that pollution in other parts of Azerbaijan has been ignored while the government leases mining operations within Artsakh and elsewhere, and many of the eco-activists demonstrated nationalistic or anti-Armenian behavior.

=== Involvement of the Azerbaijani government ===
According to media outlet Eurasianet, there was "plenty of evidence" to indicate that the Azerbaijani government was involved in the "eco-activist" component of the blockade, such as the fact that some of the participants worked for Azerbaijani state-affiliated organizations and were promoted by the Azerbaijani government. The Azerbaijani government provided the protesters with tents and food. The foreign minister of Azerbaijan, Jeyhun Bayramov also said that the participants' demands needed to be met in order to lift the blockade.

On 25 March, in violation of the ceasefire agreement, Azerbaijani forces occupied new positions in Nagorno-Karabakh and closed an alternative dirt road that certain Armenians were using to bypass the blockade at the Lachin corridor.

On 23 April, Azerbaijan formalised its blockade by installing an illegal military checkpoint at the Lachin corridor. The activists dispersed following a meeting with Aydin Karimov, a special representative of the Azerbaijani president, saying that they were "very happy with the [Azerbaijani Government's] establishment of a border control mechanism" which has reinforced the blockade.

Azerbaijan has an economic interest in the mines located within Artsakh; on 22 July 2022 the Azerbaijani government signed a $3 billion deal that leases mines located in Artsakh to the company Anglo Asian Mining. Businesses connected to the family of Azerbaijan's President Aliyev are stakeholders in the mining operation. The Azerbaijan government has also paid public relations firms to produce expert-signed op-eds, which recited Azerbaijani propaganda that environmental concerns motivated the ongoing blockade.

=== Involvement of state employees and civil servants ===
Judging by videos from the scene, those among the ranks of the participants were employees of state-owned companies, military servicemen, and workers from Turkish companies. Mikroskop Media analyzed about 50 videos of the blockade and concluded that among those involved were government-funded Azerbaijani NGOs and representatives from the ruling New Azerbaijan Party who "have nothing to do with ecology and [the] environment." Some of the participants were bused in and out from the Kharibulbul Hotel in Shusha. According to Arif Yunusov, a department head of Azerbaijan's Institute for Peace and Democracy, the government bused students to the blockade site as an incentive to make up for poor school grades. An Azerbaijani student rights activist also said that students at Baku State University were promised "benefits" for participating in the blockade at the Lachin corridor.

=== Inaccessibility of Nagorno-Karabakh to the public and independent journalists ===
The protest by the eco-activists occurred in a region officially inaccessible to the public and to independent journalists. Azerbaijan considers entering Nagorno-Karabakh and surrounding territories without permission from authorities a criminal offense. In 2021, six Azerbaijani citizens were arrested for entering these territories without permission. President Aliyev had previously appealed to Azerbaijani citizens to not enter these territories. Journalists and critics argued that the protesters were therefore officially endorsed by the government as they must have passed through this officially inaccessible region in order to reach the Lachin road.

With a handful of exceptions, only Azerbaijani journalists from state or pro-government media can directly cover the blockade going on in the Lachin corridor. A Spanish journalist was escorted to the blockade by "guides" from an Azerbaijani state-owned government group; however, the journalist was not permitted to speak with the Russian peacekeepers and was deliberately and grossly misquoted by Azeri state media as saying that vehicles could pass freely when, in fact, he said the exact opposite. The journalist's article was titled "The false ecologists who besiege a city and don't let anyone enter" but Azertac reported him as saying "Vehicles pass here without any problems. You just see people demonstrating to protect nature." The Council of Europe described Azerbaijan's "refusal to allow an independent third-party fact-finding mission...[as] fuel[ing] defiance and mistrust."

Meydan TV reported that two of its employees and an independent journalist were "detained by civilians and black masked men while going to prepare a report" from the blockade location. Before being escorted to Baku, their cameras were confiscated and their footage was deleted.

=== Scrutiny of the "protesters" and their alleged environmental concerns ===
With regards to the liberal nature of the civil protest, critics have noted that freedom of assembly is not a civil right normally practiced in Azerbaijan, where protests are quickly stopped by authorities. While Azerbaijan permitted the self-declared "eco-protest" on the Lachin corridor for several months, it simultaneously violently repressed genuine protests in other places in its country, including protests motivated by actual environmental concerns. Sheila Paylan, international human rights lawyer, points out that "Azerbaijan's sudden change of heart in respect of these particular protests is therefore per se discriminatory as they exclusively target Armenians."

The participants of the blockade did not have an extensive history of eco-activism. The blockade action appeared more political than environmental. The participants and certain government officials claim that the Artsakh government is illegally mining metal and refuse requests for the environmental impact to be inspected. Artsakh officials proposed the involvement of international environmental inspectors as a solution; however, Azerbaijani officials consistently refuse to communicate with Artsakh representatives, demanding the entry of Azerbaijani inspectors as a condition for lifting the blockade.

Critics have argued that Azerbaijan is weaponizing environmentalism in order to achieve its goals. Other critics have said that the environmental pollution created by Azerbaijan's own extraction of fossil fuels – which generates a third of the country's GDP and 88% of its export revenue – has been ignored while the government and the protesters focus on Nagorno-Karabakh. In a Time article, Simon Maghakyan described Azerbaijan as a "petro-aggressor", writing that "[making] a mockery of the existential crisis we face as a species, [the blockade] serves to further corrode Azerbaijan's civil society." He also argues that the Absheron Peninsula of Azerbaijan, considered by local scientists to be "the ecologically most devastated area in the world" has been ignored during the blockade. According to investigative journalist Charlotte Dennett, the alleged environmental concerns of the Azeri activists are "rather dubious ... since Azerbaijan hosts some of the largest oil-polluting operations in the region, if not the world." Mikroskop Media has pointed out that Azerbaijan itself has recently leased the extraction of minerals in Kalbajar, a region Artsakh surrendered to Azerbaijan in 2020.

A number of inconsistencies have been observed between the visible attitudes of the participants and the demands that an environmentalist mobilization usually raises. For example, the participants have carried a large flag of Azerbaijan, and many of them have wrapped national flags around themselves. Furthermore, several participants wore fur coats, which sparked motivations about the authenticity of their environmentalism.

Nationalist slogans took the place of environmental ones, and the participants were photographed making the hand symbol of the Gray Wolves, a Turkish ultra-nationalist organization with a history of committing violence against minorities in Turkey, including Armenians. The participants were recorded shouting Azerbaijani military chants, such as "the best soldier is the Azerbaijani soldier."

Early in the blockade, the participants released white doves (i.e. pigeons) to symbolically represent peace among nations; however, one of the pigeons was accidentally strangled to death by a woman in a fur coat as she gripped the bird and shouted through a loudspeaker. The suffocated pigeon became a symbol for the intentions of the blockade to Armenians, with hashtags such as "#WeAreThePigeon" being posted on social media. One resident told OC Media: "They say we should live peacefully together, but they want to suffocate us like that pigeon she strangled to death. It was a hint, many just didn't get it. They just want to do the same with us."

== Lawsuits ==
=== International Court of Justice ===
Armenia applied to the International Court of Justice with a request to oblige Azerbaijan to stop organizing and supporting the alleged demonstrations that have blocked free movement in both directions through the Lachin corridor. The hearing was part of a larger case that Armenia filed in 2020 alleging Azerbaijan "has breached a convention against racial discrimination".

On 22 February 2023 the court reached a legally binding ruling after a 13–2 vote, thereby satisfying the request from Armenia and ordering Azerbaijan to "take all measures at its disposal to ensure unimpeded movement of persons, vehicles and cargo along the Lachin corridor in both directions," The court declined Armenia's request to order Azerbaijan to "cease its orchestration and support of the alleged 'protests' in Lachin corridor," considering this further measure unwarranted given the previously approved directive.

The court also stated that Armenia had not provided sufficient evidence that Azerbaijan is disrupting the supply of natural gas to ratify Armenia's additional request to direct Azerbaijan to "immediately fully restore and refrain from disrupting or impeding the provision of natural gas and other public utilities to Nagorno-Karabakh." On the same day the court unanimously rejected the counterclaim filed by Azerbaijan, requesting for provisional measures against Armenia on alleged transportation and placing of mines. To date, Azerbaijan has ignored the ICJ order.

=== European Court of Human Rights ===
On 14 December 2022, Armenia applied to the ECHR requesting it to order Azerbaijan to unblock Lachin corridor. In turn, Azerbaijan applied to the ECHR on 22 December, demanding to annul the decision to apply measures against itself and to impose interim measures against Armenia. PACE monitors independently concluded that despite Azerbaijan's denial of the existence of a blockade, the movement of persons, vehicles and cargo along the Lachin corridor is severely obstructed, describing it as “unlawful and illegitimate”. The mirror application that Azerbaijan brought against Armenia was rejected by the ECHR.

On 17 January, the ECHR sent an urgent notice on the issue of the Lachin corridor to the Committee of Ministers of the Council of Europe satisfying the request made by Armenia and also rejected Azerbaijan's request to take measures against Armenia.

== Reactions ==
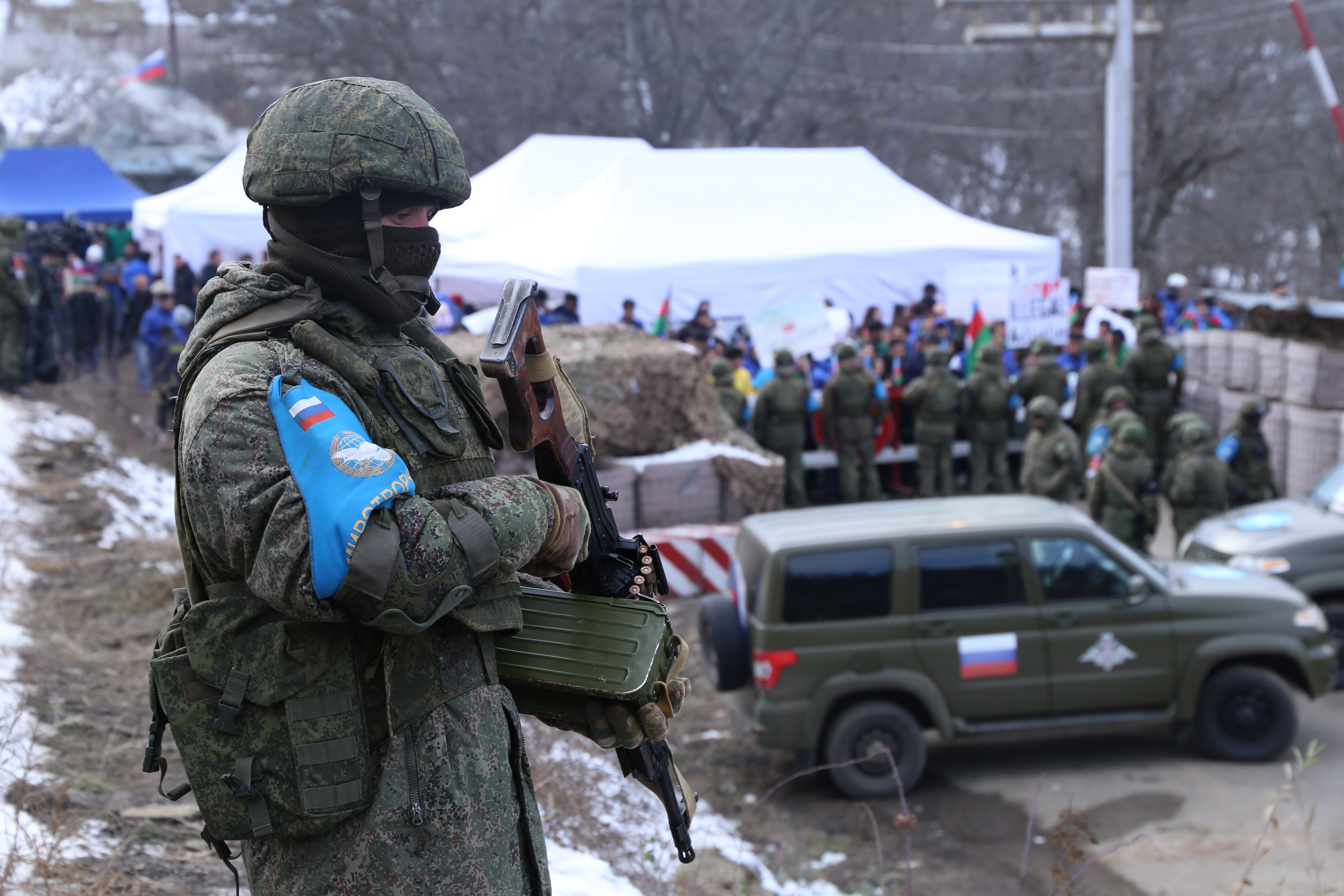
Soldiers of the peacekeeping contingent of the Russian Defense Ministry during the blockade

Numerous countries, supranational organizations, and human rights observers have condemned Azerbaijan's blockade and consider it to be a form of hybrid warfare and ethnic cleansing.

Various critics argue that the conflict is not being presented in the West in the same light as Russia's invasion of Ukraine, despite the fact that Armenia and Artsakh are making democratic reforms against Azerbaijan's increasingly authoritarian state. Freedom House wrote "there are abundant indications that an expansion of Baku's control over Nagorno-Karabakh and parts of Armenia would eliminate the freedoms and security of local people in much the same way [as Moscow's seizure of Ukrainian territory]." However, unlike Ukraine, analysts have noted that the Armenians of Nagorno-Karabakh are alone in this humanitarian crisis and that the international response has been limited to statements against the blockade instead of meaningful action.

Thomas de Waal, a political analyst and author of several books on the Nagorno-Karabakh conflict, wrote that the environmental activists were "evidently sent there by the [Azerbaijani] government" and are comparable to the "little green men" used by Russia to occupy Crimea in 2014, adding that "the eco-activists give Baku 'plausible deniability.'"

Armin Rosen, a senior writer for Tablet magazine, wrote Artsakh "is on pace to be the latest round in over a century of dispossession for [Armenians]," following the loss of Mount Ararat to Turkey (following the Armenian genocide) and the loss of Shushi to Azerbaijan (following the Second Nagorno-Karabakh War). Tigran Grigoryan, a political analyst, argues that "Azerbaijan cannot be allowed to normalise its Lachin checkpoint" given Azerbaijan's "track record of intimidating Karabakh civilians." Grigoryan described a video published by Azerbaijan which showed Artsakh residents using the military checkpoint as a "propagandist ... attempt to present an image of normalcy."

According to various political observers, Azerbaijan's supply of natural gas to Europe amid the Russian invasion of Ukraine has undermined the EU's ability to apply pressure. Bashir Kitachayev, an independent Azerbaijani journalist, says that by branding the blockade as a "civil protest", Azerbaijan can "claim there is freedom of speech in Azerbaijan. ... European officials need not be ashamed to buy fossil fuels from Baku even though they indirectly sponsor the Karabakh conflict and state repression."

Nathalie Loiseau, a French MEP and chair of the European Parliament's Subcommittee on Security and Defense said "the blockade is illegal, cruel and contradictory with Baku's claims that the territory belongs to Azerbaijan. Which country would intentionally prevent its own people from receiving food or medicine?" Michael Rubin, senior fellow at the American Enterprise Institute (AEI) and ex-Pentagon official wrote "Azerbaijani President Ilham Aliyev's attempt to starve, if not eradicate, Armenian Christians was predictable...Dictators precipitate famines when they believe they can murder opponents without consequence."

The blockade has threatened the ongoing peace process between Azerbaijan and Armenia. Lara Setrakian, a journalist and President of the Applied Policy Research Center, wrote that the blockade "sets a dangerous precedent for future conflicts, setting in motion a coercive negotiation tactic that resembles humanitarian blackmail ... [and] ... erodes faith in Baku as a genuine partner for peace." Laurence Broers, a leading scholar on the Azerbaijan–Armenia conflict, wrote that "the starvation of the Armenian population will leave a new legacy of unforgiving distrust, cancelling any hopes of reconstituting community relations."

=== Involved parties ===
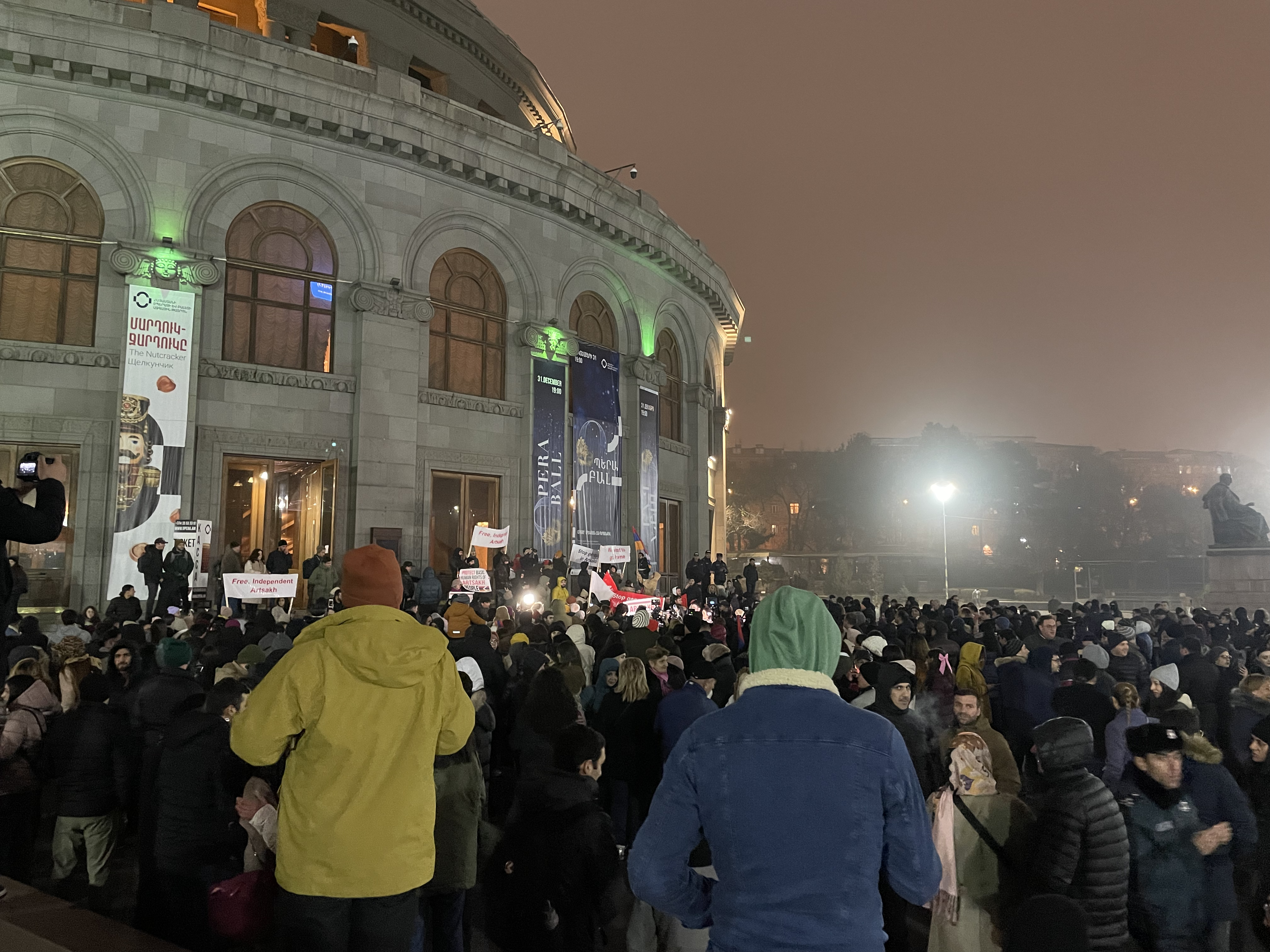
Demonstration in Yerevan demanding the opening of the Lachin corridor on 20 December.

- Armenia – The Ministry of Foreign Affairs of Armenia stated that the provocative actions of Azerbaijan may lead to a large-scale humanitarian disaster The prime minister of Armenia criticised Russian forces whose mandate is to secure transport in and out of the region as "becoming a silent witness to the depopulation of Nagorno-Karabakh." Margaryan, Permanent Representative of Armenia, told the U.N. Security Council that "the ongoing blockade is not just one isolated case, but another demonstration of systematic violence used by the Azerbaijani authorities to subject the people of Nagorno-Karabakh to ethnic cleansing." Certain Armenian officials have suggested that Russia is using the blockade to obtain concessions from Armenia. President of Armenia Vahagn Khachaturyan stated that by closing the Lachin road, Azerbaijan is not fulfilling its obligations and that while 300–400 vehicles used to pass this road daily, transporting vital necessities for the population of Nagorno-Karabakh, only 400 vehicles carrying humanitarian goods have since passed in 40 days.
- Artsakh – The President of Artsakh, Arayik Harutyunyan said Artsakh "is the only area in the world which is under complete siege. It can now be considered a concentration camp," adding that "The time has come [for the world] to take unilateral action as a last resort to prevent mass crimes." Vagram Balayan, leader of the Dashnak parliamentary faction of Artsakh, said "the Azeris actually do not want any negotiations, they just want us to disappear from history." Ruben Vardanyan, the former state minister for Artsakh said "The message that Azerbaijan is sending with these eco-activists is either you leave or you accept our rule of law, or you will starve and die because nobody cares about you all." Artak Beglarian, advisor to the Artsakh government said "Since we are being falsely accused of importing weapons, we have proposed installing devices to scan all entering vehicles. They [Azerbaijan] have not accepted that, either. What they are looking for is ethnic cleansing." Artur Tovmasyan, the speaker of Artsakh's Parliament, said: "Democratic values are on one side of the scale, oil and gas are on the other. If, in fact, democratic values were more important to the big players, the road would have been unblocked long ago."
- Azerbaijan – The government continues to deny the existence of the blockade claiming that "civilian transport can move freely in both directions" and voiced its "readiness to meet humanitarian needs of ethnic Armenians living on Karabakh". The spokesperson for the ministry, Ayxan Hajizade, called claims of a blockade "fake news". Azerbaijan's president Ilham Aliyev praised the individuals blockading Nagorno-Karabakh, saying that "they show the whole world how high-quality the Azerbaijani youth are" and stated "it is simply unfair to call the events happening on the Lachin – Khankendi road a blockade." Aliyev said that "Armenians living in Karabakh must either accept Azerbaijani citizenship or look for another place to live" adding that "I am sure that the majority of the Armenian population living in Karabakh today is ready to accept Azerbaijani citizenship. It's just that these leeches, these wild animals, the separatists [referring to the de facto Republic of Artsakh representatives] don't allow it."
- Russia – The Russian Foreign Affairs spokeswoman Maria Zakharova stated on the third day of the blockade that "Russia's defense ministry and the Russian peacekeeping contingent have been actively working to de-escalate the situation and we expect full transport links to be restored in the very near future." On 12 January 2023, Zakharova stated: "We continue to work on complete unblocking of the Lachin corridor in accordance with the tripartite statement of the leaders of Russia, Armenia and Azerbaijan of November 9, 2020." On 18 January 2023, Russia's foreign minister Sergei Lavrov stated that Russian defense officials are investigating Azerbaijan's allegations that Armenia was transporting land mines through the Lachin corridor. He also proposed that Russian peacekeepers could examine cargo transported via this road, adding that he believed the issue would be settled shortly. On 16 March 2023, Zakharova dismissed Yerevan's attempts to shift “responsibility for Karabakh" on the Russian peacekeeping forces.

=== International ===
- Australia – Ambassador Graeme Meehan deeply concerned about the humanitarian situation, called for the Lachin corridor to be reopened
- Brazil – Ambassador Ronaldo Costa Filho called for open channels of dialogue and said "any obstruction jeopardizes the well-being of the people of Nagorno-Karabakh and threatens the reconciliation process between Armenia and Azerbaijan."
- Canada – The Foreign Ministry called on Azerbaijan to open the Lachin corridor. The House of Commons also unanimously adopted a motion calling on Azerbaijan to open the Lachin corridor, guarantee the freedom of movement and avoid further deterioration of the humanitarian situation in the region of Nagorno-Karabakh. Azerbaijan's installation of a checkpoint was also condemned as undermining the peace process.
- Cyprus – The Foreign Ministry called on Azerbaijan to lift the blockade and restore gas supply. Christiana Erotokritou, an alternate member to PACE, said at session discussing the blockade, "The aim of this is, clearly, to force all Armenians living in Nagorno-Karabakh to abandon and flee their ancestral homes in order to achieve ethnic cleansing."
- Estonia – The Ministry of Foreign Affairs expressed concern about the blockade which poses "severe human suffering of the local population in Nagorno-Karabakh".
- France – The Foreign Ministry called for the unblocking of the Lachin corridor without any conditions and to respect the rights of the Armenians living in Nagorno-Karabakh. Speaker of parliament Yaël Braun-Pivet during her visit to Yerevan stated that her country is concerned about the blockade of Nagorno-Karabakh and the deepening humanitarian crisis, and that in order to achieve a peaceful and lasting solution, it is necessary to restore dialogue between Armenia and Azerbaijan. She also said that France will not impose sanctions on Azerbaijan.
- Germany – Commissioner for Human Rights and Humanitarian Assistance called for the restoration of free movement of people, vehicles and goods on the Lachin corridor as soon as possible, noting the risk of grave humanitarian effects for civilians in Nagorno-Karabakh. On 7 February 2023, Foreign Minister Annalena Baerbock called for immediate reopening of Lachin corridor, emphasizing the humanitarian consequences of the blockade.
- Greece – The Ministry of Foreign Affairs called on the Azerbaijani authorities to ensure freedom and security of movement and transport without any preconditions, and that the local population should be spared from hardships and distress.
- Iceland – Birgir Thórarinsson, Spokesperson for the European People's Party in PACE described the situation as "totally unacceptable," adding that "I hope that Azerbaijan will change its course and start showing that they have nothing to hide, start showing real humanity to their neighbours, start showing that they care for the needs of innocent people."
- Ireland – called on Azerbaijan to immediately and unconditionally restore freedom and security in the Lachin corridor.
- Lebanon – The Foreign Ministry said it deeply regrets the closure of the Lachin corridor and impact on the livelihood and humanitarian conditions in the area.
- Lithuania – The Ministry of Foreign Affairs expressed concern about the continuing blockade and its resulting severe humanitarian consequences for Nagorno-Karabakh.
- Luxembourg – The Foreign Minister Jean Asselborn called on Azerbaijan to ensure free and safe movement along the Lachin corridor stating that Nagorno-Karabakh is "the homeland of Armenians and nobody has the right to block this Lachin corridor and I hope that those who have the means to interfere that they will do it as effective as possible".
- Netherlands – The Ministry of Foreign Affairs called for the unblocking of the Lachin corridor, and for Armenia and Azerbaijan to restart peace negotiations. The Netherlands parliament adopted a resolution calling on the government to urge the European Council to pressure Azerbaijan to cease hostilities against the people of Artsakh and to open the Lachin Corridor. It also stated that: "Russian peacekeepers do not intervene in that area, and that this situation threatens to create a humanitarian emergency for the population of Nagorno-Karabakh."
- Norway – The Minister of Foreign affairs Mona Juul called on Azerbaijan to guarantee safe movement across the Lachin corridor: "It is in nobody's interest to trigger an avoidable humanitarian situation in Nagorno-Karabakh. ... The international community cannot just "weather the storm" in the hopes that [the situation] will go away"
- Poland – Its senate unanimously adopted a resolution, calling on Azerbaijan to lift the blockade and restore free movement on Lachin corridor without delay or preconditions.
- Spain – Its congress unanimously adopted a statement which "Calls on the Azerbaijani authorities to ensure the freedom and safety of movement along the corridor in accordance with the trilateral declaration of November 9, 2020. Restrictions on free movement cause great suffering to the population and can create a humanitarian crisis."
- Switzerland – Switzerland's representative to the UNSC stated "We call on the parties concerned to guarantee the rapid, safe and unimpeded delivery of humanitarian aid to those in need. We deplore the fact that humanitarian actors such as the ICRC are not always able to carry out their operations, as is currently the case across the Lachin corridor in the South Caucasus."
- Turkey – The Ambassador to Azerbaijan Cahit Bağcı, personally visited the blockade, writing on Twitter, "Karabakh is Azerbaijan."
- United Kingdom – the Minister of State for European Affairs Leo Docherty has expressed concern that the blocking of the Lachin corridor and disrupting gas supplies in winter risks severe humanitarian consequences.
- United States – Department of State spokesman Ned Price said that the closure of the corridor has serious humanitarian consequences and called on Azerbaijan to restore free movement through the Lachin corridor. Department Deputy Spokesperson Vedant Patel said on 16 December that closure of the Lachin corridor has potentially severe humanitarian implications, calling for the restoration of free movement through the corridor as soon as possible. Ambassador Robert A. Wood, Alternative Representative for Special Political Affairs, called on "the government of Azerbaijan and others responsible for the corridor's security to restore free movement, including for humanitarian and commercial use, as soon as possible" during the UN Security Council meeting on 20 December 2022. On 22 December 2022, US National Security Advisor Jake Sullivan expressed ongoing concern of the United States over impeded access to the Lachin corridor and the growing humanitarian implications of this situation, calling to fully restore the free movement through the corridor. Five USA congress members issued a separate statement: "It is disturbing that the only time the people of Azerbaijan are allowed to freely protest is when it threatens the lives of Armenians. ... We urge the United States and our European partners to use every diplomatic tool at their disposal to halt this clearly fabricated crisis created by Azerbaijan."
  - Los Angeles – On 4 January, the mayor sent a letter to President Biden urging the United States "come to the aid of the people of Artsakh". The mayor issued this statement after a cordon of Armenian truckers paralysed the traffic around her residence to bring attention to the brewing humanitarian crisis.
- Uruguay – Its senate called for the end of the blockade of Artsakh by Azerbaijan putting an end to the harassment of the civilian population, and expressed solidarity with the people of Artsakh.
- Vatican City – Pope Francis expressed concern about "precarious humanitarian conditions of the people, which are in further danger of deteriorating during the winter season", speaking of the "situation created in the Lachin corridor in the South Caucasus." On 29 January 2023, he reiterated his plea to find a peaceful solution to "grave humanitarian situation in the Lachin Corridor.", calling the conditions that the blockade created for the local population "inhumane".

=== Supranational ===
- European Union – "The EU calls on Azerbaijan to ensure freedom of movement, and that restrictions to such freedom of movement cause significant distress to the local population and creates humanitarian concerns." PACE co-rapporteurs for the monitoring of Azerbaijan and Armenia also released a joint statement urging for urgent restoration of freedom of movement along the Lachin corridor. Nathalie Loiseau, Chair of the European Parliament's Subcommittee on Security and Defence, said that the EU should use its economic ties to put pressure on Azerbaijan to end the blockade, saying "we mustn't shy away from defending universal values. If we don't do it, who will act?" Josep Borrell, High Representative for Foreign Affairs and Security Policy, stated that the EU is not considering imposing sanctions on Azerbaijan, and its efforts are focused on achieving solutions through dialogue. The EU also stated that Azerbaijan's suggestion that goods could be supplied through territory controlled by Azerbaijan "should not be seen as an alternative to the reopening of the Lachin corridor."
  - The Renew Europe Group of the EU Parliament called on Azerbaijan to unconditionally end the blockade. Nathalie Loiseau, the MEP that initiated the resolution, said "it is more than a blockade that he [President Aliyev] is imposing, more than blackmail, it is ethnic cleansing that he wants."
- Council of Europe – the organization has called for movement along the Lachin corridor to be restored multiple times. The Assembly also issued a report where it said that it "is extremely worried by the hostile and threatening rhetoric used against Armenians at the highest level of Azerbaijan's leadership and urges Azerbaijan to repudiate such rhetoric and take steps to tackle both hate speech, including by public and high-level officials, and hate crime," adding that "it urges Azerbaijan to restore electricity and gas supplies without delay or impediment." In the report PACE concluded "Peace is not only the absence of war. Peace is feeling free and safe in a society which gives you the opportunities to strive for happiness, development and fulfilment. So far, Azerbaijan has not demonstrated its readiness to guarantee such freedom and safety for the Armenians living on its territory and under its jurisdiction."
- United Nations – The blockade was discussed by the UN Security Council. All members of the Security Council who spoke called on Baku to ensure free and safe movement along the Lachin corridor; however, no resolution was adopted following the meeting. Experts from the UN Human Rights Council described the ongoing blockade as a "humanitarian emergency" and urged Azerbaijan to lift the blockade, and called on the Russian peacekeepers to protect the corridor under the terms of the ceasefire agreement.
- UNICEF – stated that: "Children are being impacted by the virtual closure of access to Nagorno-Karabakh via the Lachin corridor. The longer the situation persists, the more children will experience the lack of basic food items, while access to many of the essential services they need for their survival, healthy growth and well-being will become more challenging. Many children have also been deprived of parental care as they have been separated from their parents or legal guardians."
- Collective Security Treaty Organization – Secretary General Stanislav Zas stated that the problem at the Lachin corridor is outside of its responsibility.
- The U.S. Helsinki Commission issued a statement: "The blocking of trade and transit on the Lanchin corridor is contributing to a humanitarian catastrophe in Karabakh, and should be lifted immediately. Azerbaijan has a moral responsibility for ensuring the welfare of Karabakh Armenians."

=== Non-governmental organizations ===
- Christian Solidarity International – President John Eibner condemned the blockade, stating: "The process of the Armenian Genocide has been ongoing since the Ottoman massacres of the late nineteenth century. Now, by placing Nagorno-Karabakh under blockade, the dictatorship of Azerbaijan is clearly telegraphing its intent to carry out another phase of the Genocide". CSI also released a statement: "CSI stands in solidarity with the Armenian Christians of Nagorno-Karabakh. We support their right to govern themselves in their homeland, and we call on the United States, the United Kingdom, and the European Union, and the Russian Federation to compel Azerbaijan to end the siege of Nagorno Karabakh."
- Aurora Humanitarian Initiative – Members of the Aurora Humanitarian Initiative condemned Azerbaijan's government for the blockade and drew parallels between the humanitarian crisis it created and the 1948 Berlin blockade by Soviet Union.
- World Medical Association – Dr. Frank Ulrich Montgomery, Chair of the WMA Council, urged the Azerbaijan Government to ensure safe access through the Lachin corridor, a critical route for the delivery of vital food and medical supplies, to avoid this humanitarian crisis getting worse.
- Freedom House – wrote "we call on the international community to reiterate its support for negotiations without coercion. Azerbaijan must cease its blockage of the Lachin corridor." The organization also said "there are abundant indications that an expansion of Baku's control over Nagorno-Karabakh and parts of Armenia would eliminate the freedoms and security of local people in much the same way [as Moscow's seizure of Ukrainian territory]."
- Human Rights Watch – stated "whether the protesters have genuine environmental concerns or other grievances, Azerbaijan should ... ensure the road remains open and [that] the protest does not deny Nagorno-Karabakh residents their rights of access to essential services and goods, and to freedom of movement." In a subsequent report on hardships caused by the blockade of the "lifeline rode" it reiterated the importance of ensuring residents their rights "including the right of access to health, essential services and goods, and to freedom of movement".
- Amnesty International – stated "Azerbaijan must end the blockade of the Lachin corridor, which has left residents of Nagorno Karabakh without access to essential goods and services" after 1 month of the blockade. It issued another urgent call to immediately lift the blockade on the 60th day of the blockade, reporting that it's "putting thousands of lives in peril", causing serious hardship for access to healthcare, exacerbating human rights costs by causing food and fuel shortages and highlighted that Azerbaijan fails its human rights obligations by taking no action to lift the blockade.
- Socialist International – said in a statement that "We urge the Azerbaijan authorities to ensure freedom and security of movement along the corridor, in line with the trilateral statement of 9 November 2020. The humanitarian situation is critical and hence the SI strongly calls on the parties to dialogue and negotiation and prevent the humanitarian crisis the blocking may cause in the civil population."
- International Disability Alliance – issued a joint statement with the European Disability Forum (EDF), condemning the blockade of the "lifeline road", which "has led to a series of human rights violations as well as denial of humanitarian access that has a disproportionately negative impact on persons with disabilities. As a result of the blockade ... more than 9,000 persons with disabilities face grave human rights violations."
- The Interparliamentary Assembly on Orthodoxy – stated: "In the most unequivocal terms we condemn the unacceptable blockade of the Armenian population in Nagorno-Karabakh for over a month now, under false pretenses by organizations and the authorities of Azerbaijan, endangering the lives of 120,000 Armenian who remain in their ancestral homes. We call the international community to immediately intervene towards a solution of this peculiar siege of the Armenian population, which aims at their extermination or displacement."
- Reporters Without Borders – described Nagorno-Karabakh as "becoming a news and information black hole" due to the blockade and the fact that only Azerbaijani journalists from state or pro-government media are physically permitted past checkpoints. The organization "calls on the Azerbaijani authorities and Russian peacekeepers to allow reporters freedom of movement so that they can cover this blockade and its serious humanitarian impact." Jeanne Cavelier, the head of Reporters Without Borders's Eastern Europe and Central Asia desk commented on an instance where Azeri state media deliberately misquoted a journalist as falsely suggesting there was no blockade: "This barefaced lie by a government-controlled media outlet is further evidence of a desire on the part of the Azerbaijani authorities to manipulate national and international public opinion. They not only violate the 2020 ceasefire agreement by supporting these eco-activists but they also prevent any accurate coverage of the Lachin corridor blockade and its terrible humanitarian repercussions."

== See also ==
- 2023 Israeli blockade of the Gaza Strip
