= Fuad Isgandarov =

Azerbaijani diplomat (born 1961)

Fuad Isgandarov Azerbaijani: Fuad İsgəndərov
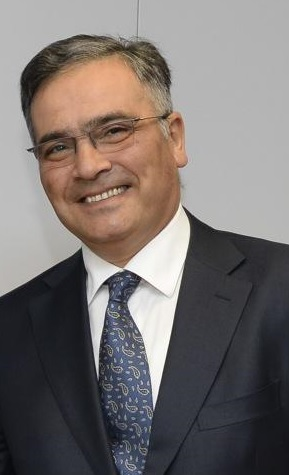

Azerbaijan Ambassador to Liechtenstein
- Incumbent
- Assumed office November 29, 2021

Azerbaijan Ambassador to Switzerland
- Incumbent
- Assumed office July 26, 2021

Azerbaijan Ambassador to Luxembourg
- In office December 11, 2012 – July 26, 2021
- Succeeded by: Vagif Sadigov

Azerbaijan Ambassador to Belgium
- In office September 25, 2012 – July 26, 2021
- Succeeded by: Vagif Sadigov

3 Azerbaijan Ambassador to the Netherlands
- In office February 22, 2007 – September 25, 2012
- Preceded by: Arif Mammadov
- Succeeded by: Mir-Hamza Efendiyev

Personal details
- Born: August 6, 1961 (age 65) Baku, Azerbaijan SSR, Soviet Union (now Azerbaijan)

Fuad Isgandarov (Azerbaijani: Fuad İsgəndərov, born August 6, 1961, in Baku, also spelled as Fuad Iskandarov) is the Ambassador Extraordinary and Plenipotentiary of the Republic of Azerbaijan to Switzerland and Liechtenstein since 2021.

== Education ==
In 1978, Isgandarov successfully completed his secondary education and has been graduated from the secondary school no. 174 in Baku. At the same year he has been admitted to the Institute of International Relations and International Law of Kiev University. In 1983, he obtained the bachelor's degrees from both International Economic Relations and English Interpretation. In addition, Isgandarov participated in various training courses. In November 1999, he attained the Executive Training Program on Crisis Management of International Law-Enforcement Academy held in Budapest, Hungary. Furthermore, he was a participant of the Black Sea executive program of John F. Kennedy School of Government, Harvard University in 2001. One year later in 2002, he took part at the executive courses on legislation organized by the U.S. Department of State, U.S. Department of Justice. Finally, Fuad Isgandarov involved in the seminar on the Role of National Military Strategy organized by George C. Marshall European Center for Security Studies in 2006.

== Teaching and scientific activity ==
In 1983–1986, Isgandarov worked as a post-graduate scientific researcher and assistant professor at the Chair of Political Economy, Azerbaijan State Economic University. Moreover, he was a part-time lecturer at the Chair of Theory of Translation, Azerbaijan University of Languages in 1984-1985 as well. After a long period, Isgandarov again worked as a part-time lecturer at the Chair of International Relations and International Law, Baku State University from 2000 to 2003.

== Professional experience ==
From 1986 to 1995, Fuad Isgandarov was in the military service. In April 1995, he started his professional career as the head of the Department of Information and Analysis at the Ministry of National Security of Azerbaijan. He remained in his post until he was appointed the Deputy Minister of National Security for political affairs in 2002. In 2006, Isgandarov became an ambassador-at-large of the Ministry of Foreign Affairs of Azerbaijan. In 2006–2007, he was the Secretary-General of the National Commission for UNESCO of the Republic of Azerbaijan.

Isgandarov was the Ambassador of Azerbaijan to the Kingdom of the Netherlands from 2007 to 2012, and the ambassador of Azerbaijan to the Kingdom of Belgium from 2012 to 2021.

At the same time, he was the head of the delegation of the Republic of Azerbaijan to the European Union.

Currently, he is the Ambassador of Azerbaijan to Switzerland and Liechtenstein since 2021
