= Vagif Sadigov =

Azerbaijani diplomat (born 1956)

Vaqif Sadıqov
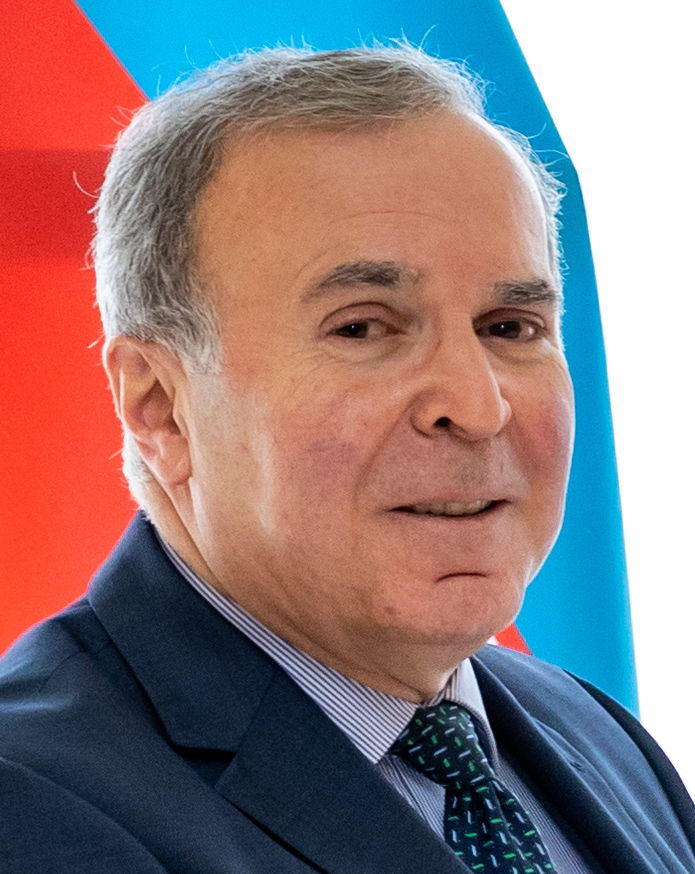
- Vaqif Sadıqov in 2020

Ambassador of Azerbaijan to the European Union, NATO and Belgium
- Incumbent
- Assumed office 26 July 2021
- Preceded by: Fuad Isgandarov

Ambassador of Azerbaijan to Italy
- In office 13 December 2010 – 23 December 2015

Ambassador of Azerbaijan to Austria
- In office 9 April 1995 – 11 May 2004

Deputy Minister of Foreign Affairs
- In office 11 May 2004 – 29 October 2010

Personal details
- Born: Vaqif İsmayıl oğlu Sadıqov; November 2, 1956 (age 70) Baku, Azerbaijan SSR, Soviet Union (now Azerbaijan)
- Children: 2
- Education: Azerbaijan University of Languages

Vaqif Sadıqov (born 2 November 1956) is an Azerbaijani diplomat currently serving as Azerbaijan's Ambassador to Belgium and the European Union.

== Background and education ==
Vaqif Sadıqov was born in Baku, Azerbaijan. He is married with two children. Vaqif Sadıqov was educated at the Azerbaijani Institute of Foreign Languages and obtained a master's degree in linguistics in 1978 and PhD degree in linguistics in 1986.

== Career ==
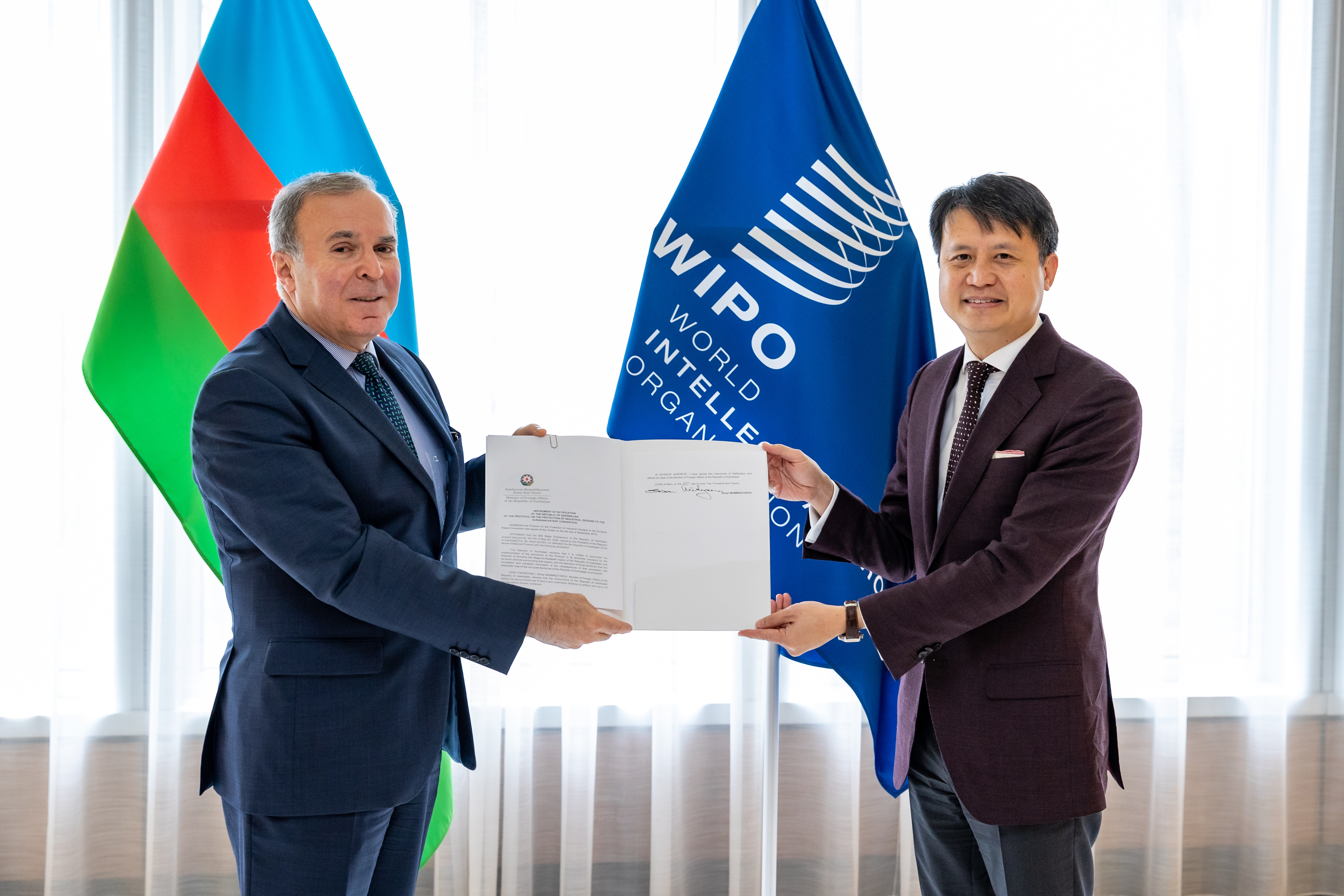
Ambassador Vaqif Sadiqov (left), Permanent Representative of Azerbaijan in December 2020

After completing his PhD degree, Vaqif Sadıqov was appointed an assistant professor in the Azerbaijani Institute of Foreign Languages, where he served until 1991. He joined the Ministry of Foreign Affairs in 1992 and became the head of the political-military affairs division from 1993 to 1995 when he was appointed Azerbaijan's Ambassador to Austria, and Permanent Representative to the United Nations Office at Vienna, UNIDO, and OSCE. He served as Permanent Representative to the Comprehensive Nuclear-Test-Ban Treaty Organization from 1998 to 2004, and to the International Atomic Energy Agency from 2001 to 2004. He participated in the negotiations on the adapted CFE Treaty and development of new CSBMs, the OSCE Charter for European Security, and the UN Conventions against Transnational Organized Crime and against Corruption.

Vaqif Sadıqov was appointed Deputy Foreign Minister in 2004 with a portfolio covering Azerbaijan's relations with the UNESCO and the Organization of the Islamic Conference. ln 2010, he was appointed Azerbaijan's Ambassador to Italy and served simultaneously as Permanent Representative to the United Nations Food and Agriculture Organization, World Food Programme, International Fund for Agricultural Development based in Rome. He was also accredited as the ambassador to Malta and San Marino.

In 2016 - 2021, he served as the Permanent Representative to the United Nations Office at Geneva. In that period, he participated in many UN conferences and events on human rights, migration, labour issues, humanitarian law, development. During that period, Vaqif Sadıqov was elected ILO Government Group chairperson, UNCTAD Trade and Development Board vice-president, and chairman of UNECE 2020 Regional Forum on Sustainable Development. Since 2019 when Azerbaijan assumed the chairmanship in the Non-Aligned Movement, Vaqif Sadıqov became a chairman of the NAM's Geneva Chapter. Since 2021, Vaqif Sadıqov has been Azerbaijan's ambassador to Belgium, and also the ambassador to Luxembourg, and Head of the Mission to the European Union.
