= Eurasianet =

American news organisation

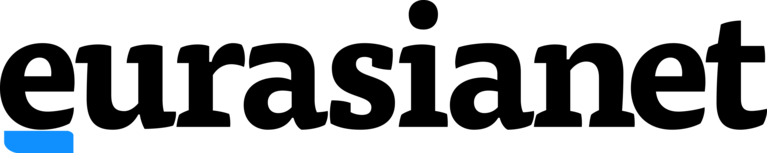
- Formation: 2000; 26 years ago
- Headquarters: Harriman Institute
- Official language: English
- Website: Official website

Eurasianet is a news organisation based at Columbia University's Harriman Institute, the United States, that provides news, information and analysis on countries in Central Asia, the Caucasus region, Russia and Southwest Asia. Launched in 2000, it operated under the auspices of the Eurasia Project of the Open Society Foundations (OSF). Eurasianet spun off in 2016 to become a tax-exempt non-profit news organization. The organisation receives support from Google, OSF, the Foreign, Commonwealth and Development Office, the Arnold A. Saltzman Institute of War and Peace Studies, the National Endowment for Democracy and other grant-making institutions.

Eurasianet has won EPpy Awards for its special feature website on the Kyrgyz Revolution Revisited (2007) and for Best News website with under 250,000 monthly visitors (2011). It has also received numerous citations from the Webby Awards.

In April 2026, the site was declared an undesirable organization in Russia.
