= American Hellenic Institute =

Greek American organization

American Hellenic Institute (AHI)

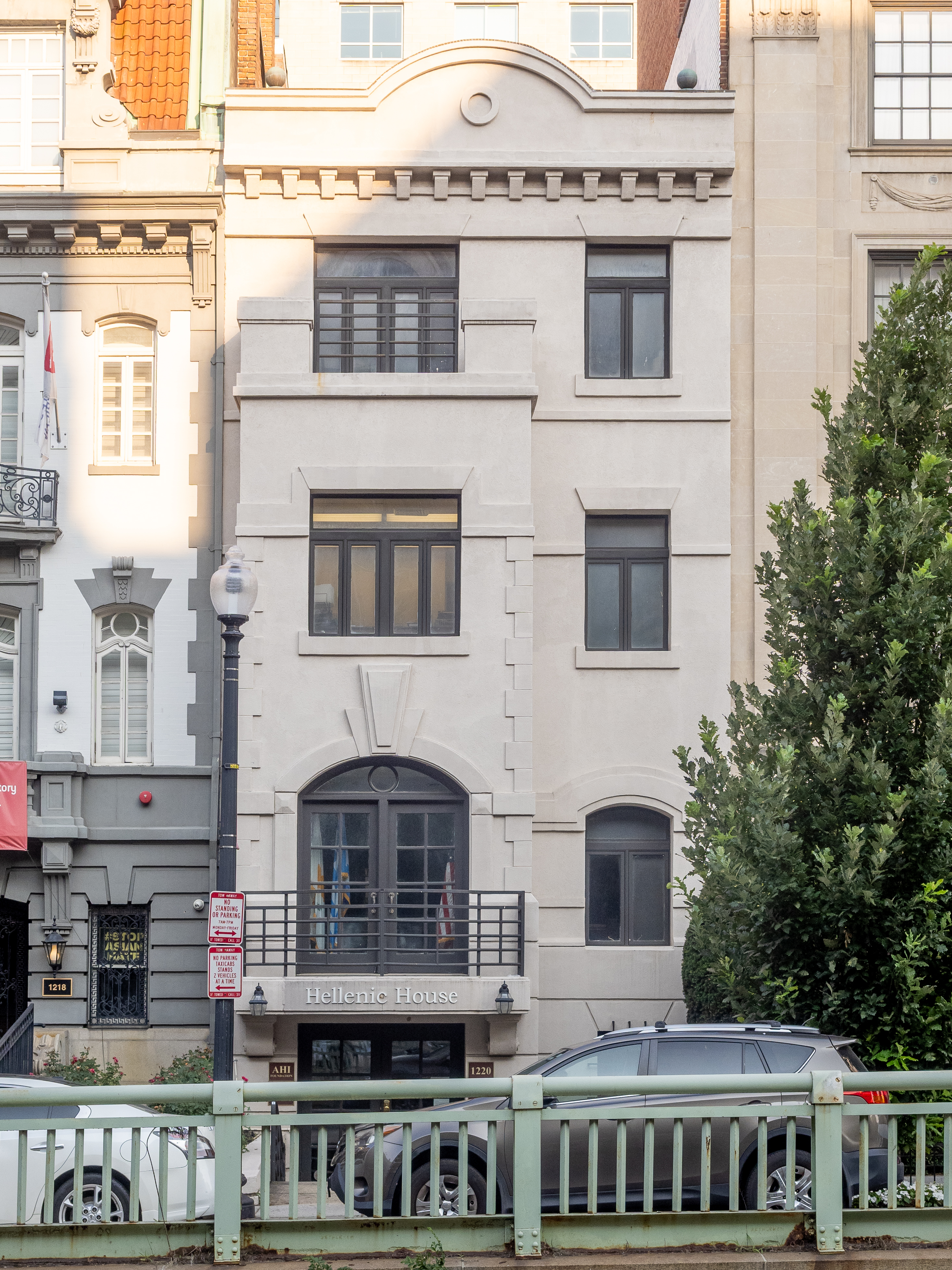
- Formation: August 1, 1974; 52 years ago
- Founder: Assistant Secretary of the Treasury Gene Rossides
- Purpose: Promoting U.S. foreign policy interests
- Headquarters: 1220 16th St NW, Washington, DC 20036
- Region served: Southern Europe and the Eastern Mediterranean
- President and CEO: Nick Larigakis
- Website: https://americanhellenicinstitute.org/

The American Hellenic Institute (AHI) is an advocacy organization and policy center founded by United States Assistant Secretary of the Treasury Eugene Rossides in 1974. Its purpose is promoting United States foreign policy interests involving Southern Europe and the Eastern Mediterranean, with a focus on countries including Greece, the Republic of Cyprus, and Türkiye.

== History ==
The American Hellenic Institute was created on August 1, 1974, by United States Assistant Secretary of the Treasury Eugene Rossides in response to the Turkish invasion of the Republic of Cyprus. In its advocacy for a U.S. response to the invasion, AHI argued that Turkey had violated the US Foreign Assistance Act of 1961 and Foreign Military Sales Act by using U.S. weapons for actions other than legitimate self-defense purposes. Under continued pressure from AHI, Congress passed an arms embargo on Turkey in December of 1974. That same month, AHI initiated a $25 million congressional aid package to the Republic of Cyprus.

Throughout its over half a century of advocacy, AHI expanded beyond promoting U.S. policy regarding the invasion of the Republic of Cyprus and has since evolved into a standard foreign policy advocacy organization, with a focus on Southern Europe and the Eastern Mediterranean.

== Associated Organizations ==
Other groups include:

- American Hellenic Institute Foundation, Inc. (AHIF, a non-profit think tank created in 1975)

== Notable Members ==
- United States Assistant Secretary of the Treasury Eugene Rossides, founder of the American Hellenic Institute. Rossides received the Homeric Award in January 2008 from the Chian Federation, an organization of Greek-Americans from the island of Chios, in honor of his achievements in promoting United States interests in Greece and supporting human rights. Rossides was a lawyer at Rogers & Wells.
- Nick Larigakis, President and CEO of AHI.

== Regions of Focus ==
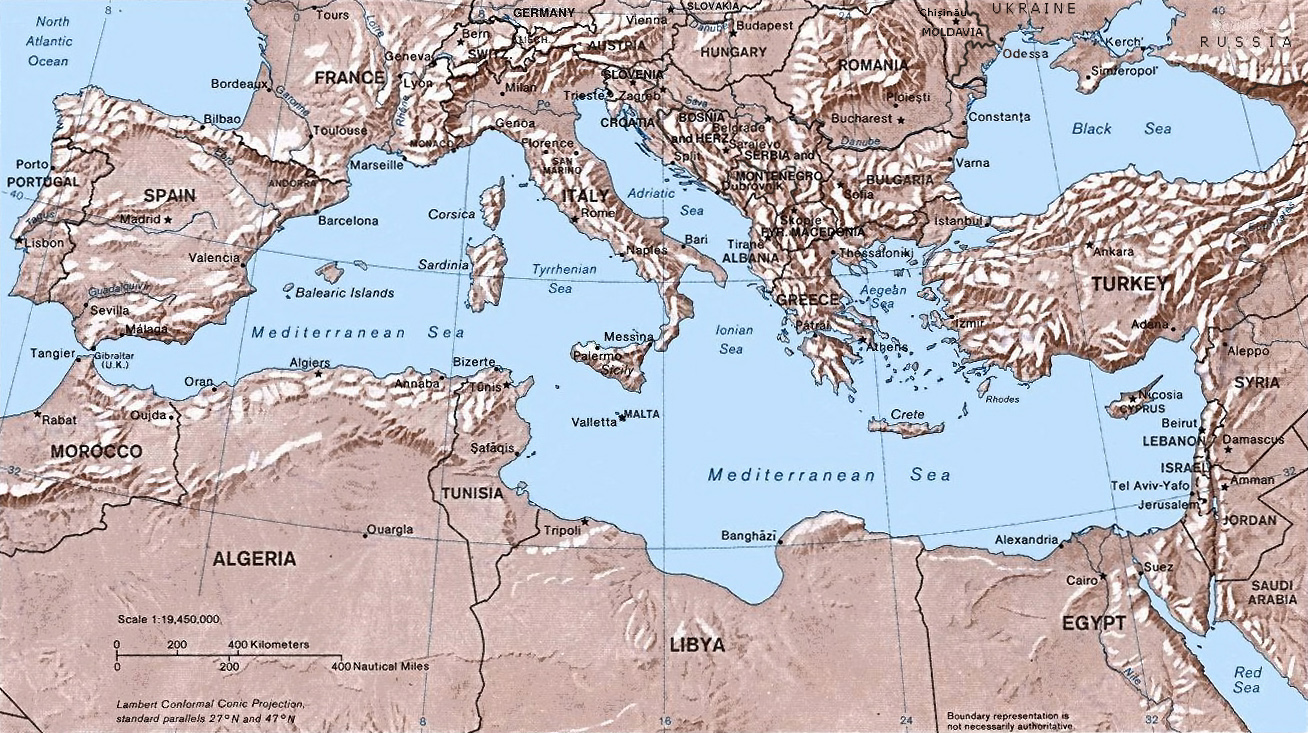
AHI is active in foreign policy issues affecting Cyprus, Greece, Albania, Turkey, and North Macedonia, among others.

AHI has been a part of many political activities and lobbying actions to promote U.S. foreign policy interests regarding Southern Europe and the Eastern Mediterranean, primarily involving countries including Greece, the Republic of Cyprus, Türkiye, Israel, Syria, Albania, North Macedonia, and Serbia.

AHI has also been involved in promoting U.S. policy interests involving countries in West Asia, such as Armenia and Azerbaijan, mostly regarding the U.S. response to Türkiye's involvement in the Nagorno-Karabakh conflict.

In addition to specific regions, AHI also focuses on promoting U.S. foreign policy interests related to the European Union and NATO.

AHI frequently partners with Jewish American and Armenian American lobbying groups to promote policy related to U.S. interests in Israel and Armenia. This has included the Anti-Defamation League (ADL), B'nai B'rith, Conference of Presidents of Major American Jewish Organizations, the American Jewish Committee (AJC), Jewish Institute for National Security of America (JINSA), Foundation for Defense of Democracies (FDD), the Armenian Assembly of America, and others.

== Major Activities ==
=== Policy Advocacy ===
AHI has been involved in the creation of the following policies and initiatives:

1974: An arms sale embargo on Turkey following its invasion of the Republic of Cyprus. A $25 million Congressional aid package to the Republic of Cyprus.

1989: Following discussions on the topic of the occupation of the Republic of Cyprus, AHI received a letter from then-Senator Joe Biden stating "we must send a signal to Turkey that until it has removed every last soldier from Cyprus, it will never be recognized as a full member of the international community."

1998: Section 2804 of the FY1998 Omnibus Emergency Supplemental Appropriations Act, which "Expresses the sense of the Congress that the United States should use its influence to suggest that the Government of Turkey: (1) recognize the Ecumenical Patriarchate (in Turkey) and its nonpolitical, religious mission; and (2) reopen the Ecumenical Patriarchate's Halki Patriarchal School of Theology."

2024: A letter from Members of Congress to Secretary of State Antony Blinken and Director of National Intelligence Avril Haines to request a classified briefing on Turkey's support of Hamas and other US-designated terrorist organizations.

=== Congressional Commemorations ===
AHI facilitates multiple annual congressional commemorations in conjunction with the Congressional Caucus on Hellenic Issues, including the yearly Congressional Commemoration of the Invasion of the Republic of Cyprus and the Congressional Salute to Greek Independence Day.

=== Conferences and Seminars ===
In order to provide education on its policy areas to lawmakers and stakeholders, AHI regularly hosts conferences with panels that typically includes members of the U.S. Department of State, the U.S. National Security Council, the U.S. Congress, and various academic institutions.

== Policy Areas ==
=== Defense Cooperation ===
The most active area of policy advocacy of AHI involves defense cooperation between the United States and Greece, the United States and the Republic of Cyprus, and various multilateral structures, including NATO.

AHI provides annual testimony to the House of Representatives Appropriations Committee and the Senate Appropriations Committee regarding defense cooperation in the Southern European and Eastern Mediterranean regions. This includes topics such as International Military Education and Training (IMET) and Foreign Military Financing (FMF). AHI also publishes fact-sheets and resources guides on the defense cooperation between the United States and Greece and between the United States and the Republic of Cyprus for the use of Members of Congress and their staff.

AHI specifically highlights the benefits of U.S. Naval Support Activity Souda Bay and the Hellenic Crete Naval Base at Souda Bay, Crete. This base features the only deep water port in Southern Europe and the Mediterranean Sea that is suitable and capable of maintaining the largest aircraft carriers. AHI also promotes the strategic importance of Crete hosting the NATO Maritime Interdiction Operational Training Centre (ΝMIOTC) and the NATO Missile Firing Installation (NAMFI).

=== Energy Development ===
AHI also has done significant advocacy regarding U.S. policy toward energy development in the Eastern Mediterranean. This includes supporting energy production initiatives that would counter Russia in the European energy sector. A key policy in this area includes advocating for U.S. protection of the exclusive economic zone (EEZ) of Greece and the Republic of Cyprus, which has come under repeated dispute and disruption from Turkey.

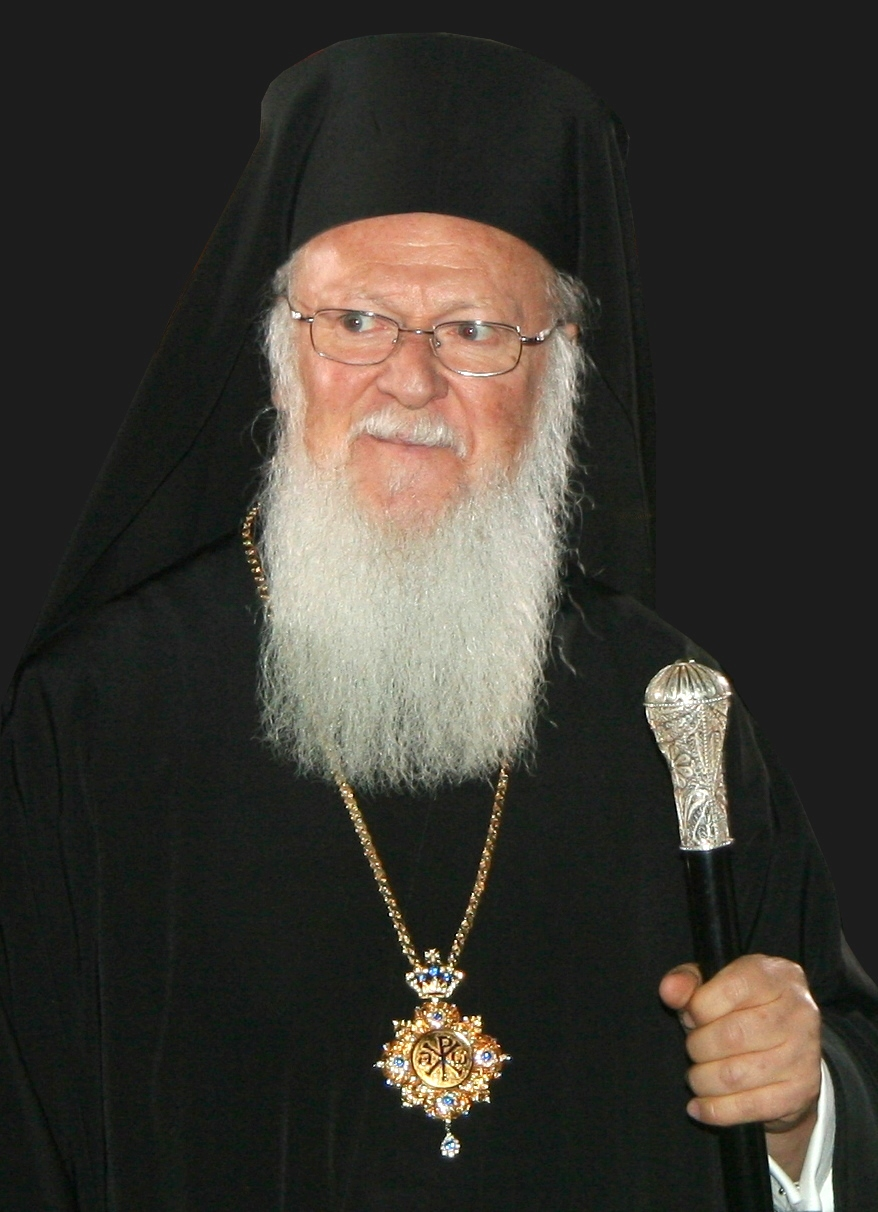
The Ecumenical Patriarch of Constantinople, Bartholomew I

=== Other Issues ===
AHI has been a longtime supporter of the United States recognizing genocides committed by Turkey, specifically the Greek Genocide, including the Pontic Genocide, and the Armenian Genocide. In 2019, the United States Congress officially recognized all such genocides.

AHI has provided testimony at the state legislature level to encourage the adoption of the Greek Genocide in genocide education curriculums.

== Media Coverage ==
Advocacy work by AHI has been covered by mainstream U.S. media, including The Washington Post, Time, CNN, The Hill, and Politico. Additionally, AHI is covered by Greek American media such as To Vima (partnered with the Wall Street Journal), Ekathimerini, and the National Herald.

== See also ==
- American Hellenic Educational Progressive Association
- Cyprus dispute
- Lobbying in the United States
- Greek American
- Diaspora politics in the United States
- Macedonia naming dispute
