= Greek American lobby in the United States =

Pro-Greece groups and individuals in the U.S.

The Greek American lobby in the United States refers to the lobbyists, lawyers, and public relation specialists that work to promote U.S. interests in Greece by strengthening the bilateral relationship between the two countries. Such efforts include a decades long presence of public advocacy directed at the U.S. Congress, the Department of State, the White House, and other government institutions.

The oldest Greek American organization specifically dedicated to promoting public policy is the American Hellenic Institute (AHI), founded in 1974 by United States Assistant Secretary of the Treasury Eugene Rossides. Public advocacy is also done by the American Hellenic Educational Progressive Association (AHEPA), which is oldest Greek American organization, being founded in 1922 with a focus on counteracting attacks on Greek Americans by the Ku Klux Klan.

The Greek American lobby has a history of cooperation with other national lobbies in the United States, most notably being the Jewish American lobby and to a lesser extent the Armenian American lobby.

== Role of Greek American public officials ==
Over the course of American history, Greek Americans have served in many different areas of the government, such as former Vice-president Spiro Agnew, Senators Olympia Snowe, Paul Sarbanes and Paul Tsongas, former CIA Director George Tenet, and 1988 Presidential candidate and former Massachusetts Governor Michael Dukakis.

The Greek American lobby has focused its efforts on building relationships with Greek American public officials and frequently collaborate on different initiatives. For example, the American Hellenic Institute works in conjunction with the Congressional Caucus on Hellenic Issues to co-host an annual Congressional Salute to Greek Independence Day and an annual Congressional Commemoration of the Invasion of the Republic of Cyprus.

There are currently 7 Greek Americans serving in the U.S. Congress:

- Representative Chris Pappas
- Representative Gus Bilirakis
- Representative Dina Titus
- Representative Nicole Malliotakis
- Representative Mike Haridopolos
- Representative Maggie Goodlander
- Representative Jimmy Patronis.

== Working in cooperation with the Jewish American lobby ==
Since the 20th century, the Greek American and Jewish American lobbies in the US have worked in parallel in order to prevent any rise in tensions in the unstable Eastern Mediterranean and promote U.S. foreign policy interests in this region.

Following the attack on Israel by Hamas on October 7, 2023, cooperation between the Greek American and Jewish American lobbies has greatly increased due to the U.S. utilizing Greece and Cyprus in its response to the conflict, such as evacuating U.S. citizens from Israel to Cyprus and using Cyprus as a military staging ground. Additionally, both lobbies assert that US-Turkey relations need to be reevaluated following Turkey's growing hostility to Israel, Greece, and the Republic of Cyprus following October 7, along with Turkey's support of Hamas.

This increase in cooperation has been reflected in shared public advocacy efforts, including the American-Hellenic-Israeli Eastern Mediterranean Counterterrorism and Maritime Security Partnership Act of 2025, was initiated by the American Hellenic Institute and has received support from the American Israel Public Affairs Committee (AIPAC), B'nai B'rith International, the Jewish Institute for National Security of America (JINSA), the Foundation for Defense of Democracies (FDD), the American Hellenic Educational Progressive Association (AHEPA), and The Hellenic American National Council (HANC).

== See also ==
- American Hellenic Institute (AHI)
- American Hellenic Educational Progressive Association (AHEPA)
- Greece–United States relations
- Greece-Israel relations
- Cyprus-Israel relations
- Lobbying in the United States
- Energy Triangle
