= Ioannis Pavlopoulos =

Vice Admiral Ioannis G. Pavlopoulos (Greek: Ιωάννης Γ. Παυλόπουλος) is a Hellenic Navy special operations and line officer, and since 2017 the Chief of the Fleet Headquarters, the Hellenic Navy's main operational command.

== Biography ==
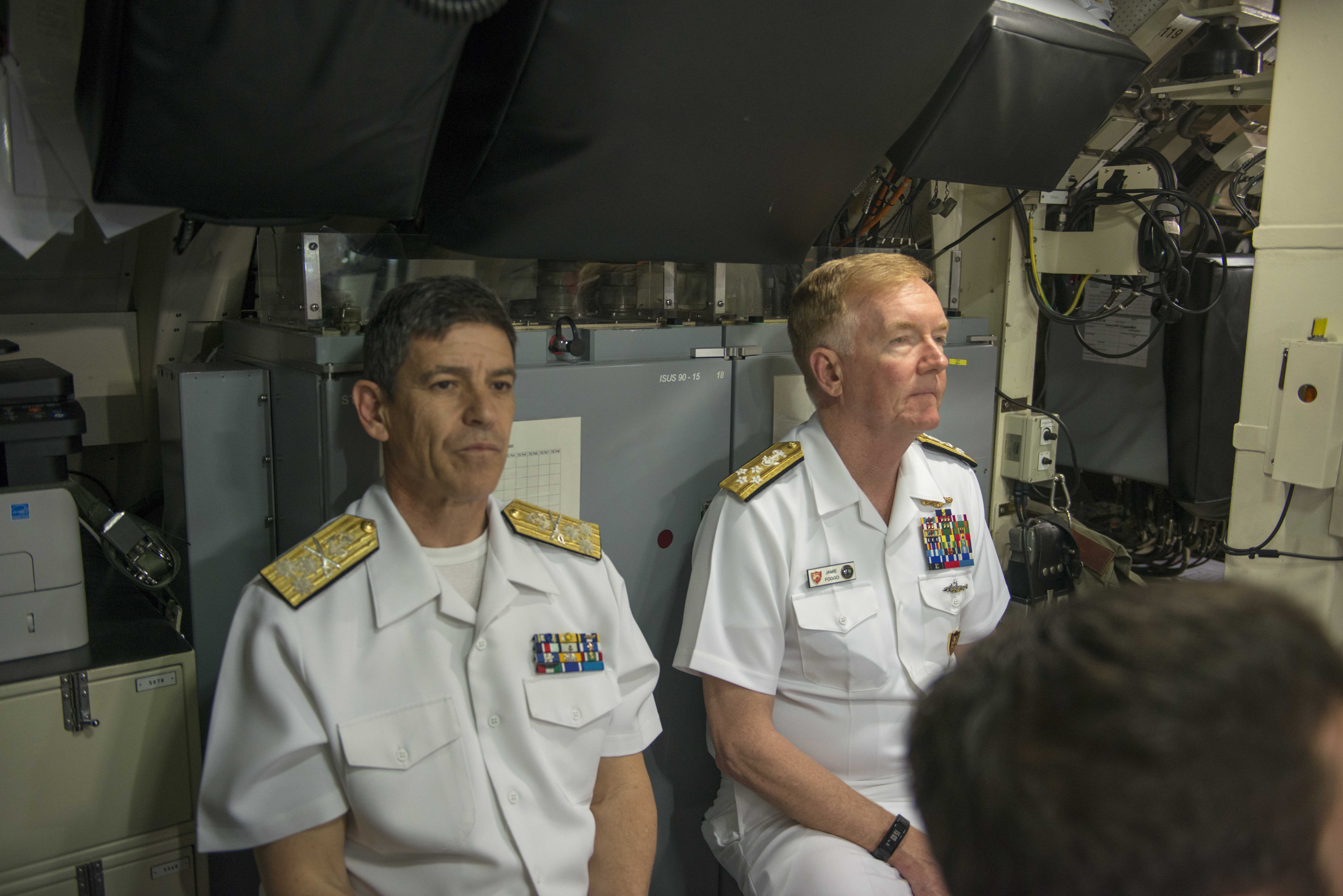
180510-N-MZ309-341 SALAMIS NAVAL BASE (May 10, 2018) Adm. James G. Foggo III, commander, U.S. Naval Forces Europe-Africa and commander, Allied Joint Force Command Naples, Italy, and Vice Adm. Ioannis Pavlopoulos, commander in chief of the Hellenic Fleet Command, receive a brief aboard Hellenic Navy submarine HS Matrozos (S 122) at a Salamis Naval Base in Greece, May 10, 2018. U.S. Naval Forces Europe-Africa, headquartered in Naples, oversees joint and naval operations, often in concert with allied and interagency partners, to enable enduring relationships and increase vigilance and resilience in Europe and Africa. (U.S. Navy photo by Mass Communication Specialist 1st Class Ryan Riley/Released)

Ioannis G. Pavlopoulos was born in Thessaloniki in 1961. He entered the Hellenic Navy Academy in 1979, and graduated in 1983 as a Line Ensign.

He served aboard various ships as a junior officer, and in 1989–1994 served in the Navy's elite Underwater Demolition Command (OYK/DYK). He graduated from various Hellenic Army, US, and NATO parachute and special forces schools and courses, as well as the Hellenic Navy's General Training School (with specialization in Communications), the Navy Staff Officers School, and the Navy War School. As part of his OYK service, he participated in Operation Desert Shield against Iraq in 1990, and in Operation Sharp Guard during the Bosnian War in 1992 and 1994 as head of naval boarding detachments. In 1991, he served as a volunteer under UN forces in Iraqi Kurdistan for six months. In 1993, he was responsible for the security teams protecting the visiting US military chiefs, and the former Soviet president, Mikhail Gorbachev, during their visits to Greece.

He subsequently served as executive officer on the destroyer Kimon, captain of the landing ship Rodos (1995–1997), head of administration and of the cadet battalion at the Navy Academy (1997–1999), Amphibious Operations Director of the Landing Ship Command (1999–2000), Director Current Operations at the Hellenic Navy General Staff (2000–2002), Naval Attaché in the Greek embassy in Paris (2002–2005), captain of the landing ship Samos (2005–2006), commander of the Underwater Demolition Command (2006–2008), Deputy Director of the Navy's Staff Officer School (2009–2010), and Director of the Athens Multinational Sealift Coordination Center (2010–2012).

Promoted to Commodore, in 2012–2015 he commanded the NATO Maritime Interdiction Operational Training Centre in Souda Bay. Promoted to rear admiral in March 2015, he was appointed director of the Strategy and Policy Branch at the Hellenic National Defence General Staff, as well as taking charge of Greek cooperation with the European Defence Agency and NATO Allied Command Transformation. On 16 January 2017, by decision of the Government Council for Foreign Affairs and Defence, he was promoted to vice admiral and appointed Chief of Fleet Headquarters.

In September 2019 he was appointed as the National Military Representative of Greece to the Military Committee of NATO and the European Union Military Committee.

Vice Admiral Pavlopoulos is married and has two children. He speaks English and French.

== Awards ==
In addition to the usual Greek medals and awards accorded to his rank and positions, Vice Admiral Pavlopoulos has also been awarded medals by the governments of Kuwait and Saudi Arabia for his participation in the Gulf War, as well as a UN peacekeeping medal and a US Army marksmanship award. In 2006, he was named a Knight of the French National Order of Merit for his tenure as naval attaché in France.
