= Greece–United States relations =

- Greece: United States

Diplomatic mission
- Greek Embassy, Washington, D.C.: United States Embassy, Athens

Envoy
- Ambassador Antonis Alexandridis: Chargé d'affaires ad interim Josh Huck

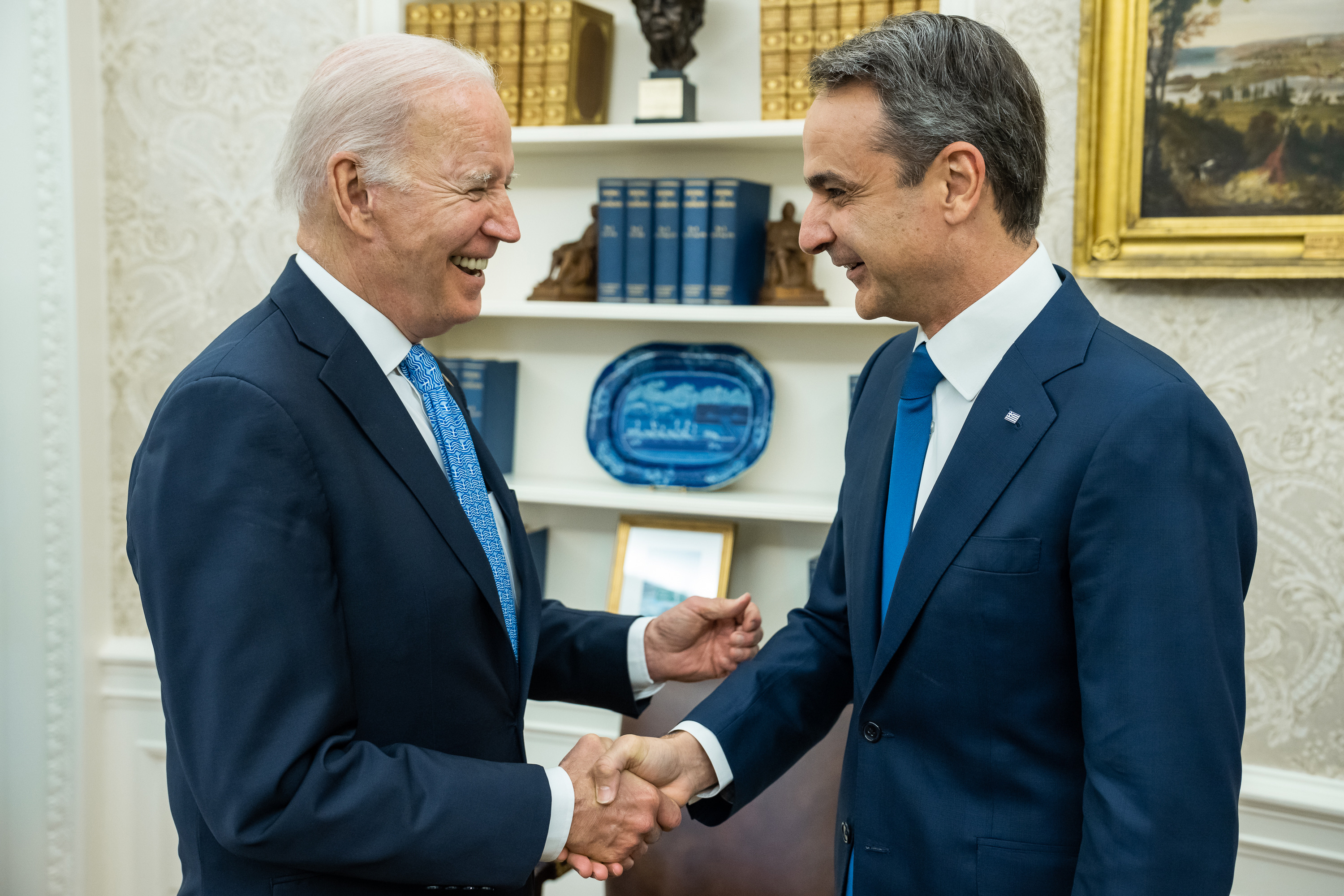
Greek Prime Minister Kyriakos Mitsotakis with President Joe Biden in the White House, May 2022.

Greece and the United States today enjoy strong diplomatic relations and consider each other an ally.

Diplomatic relations between Greece and the United States were established in the 1830s after the Greek War of Independence. Greece and the United States have long-standing historical, political, and cultural ties based on a common western heritage, and participation as Allies in global conflicts including World War I, World War II, the Cold War and the war on terror. The governments of the two countries cooperate closely in the areas of finance, energy, commerce, technology, academics, sciences, judiciary, intelligence and military, as well as through many multilateral organizations such as the Organization for Security and Co-operation in Europe (OSCE), the Organisation for Economic Co-operation and Development (OECD), the North Atlantic Treaty Organization (NATO), and the United Nations; they are both founding members of the latter.

From 2013 to 2023, the United States was the 6th largest source of foreign direct investment in Greece.

== History ==
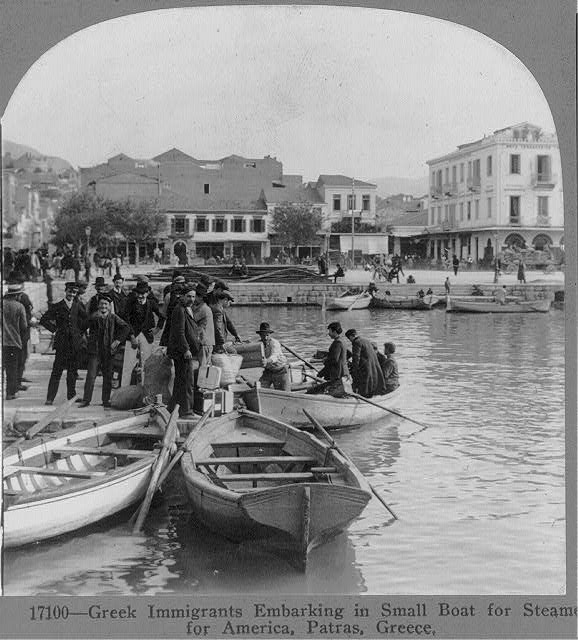
Greek immigrants embarking in a small boat for a steamer for America from the port of Patras, 1910

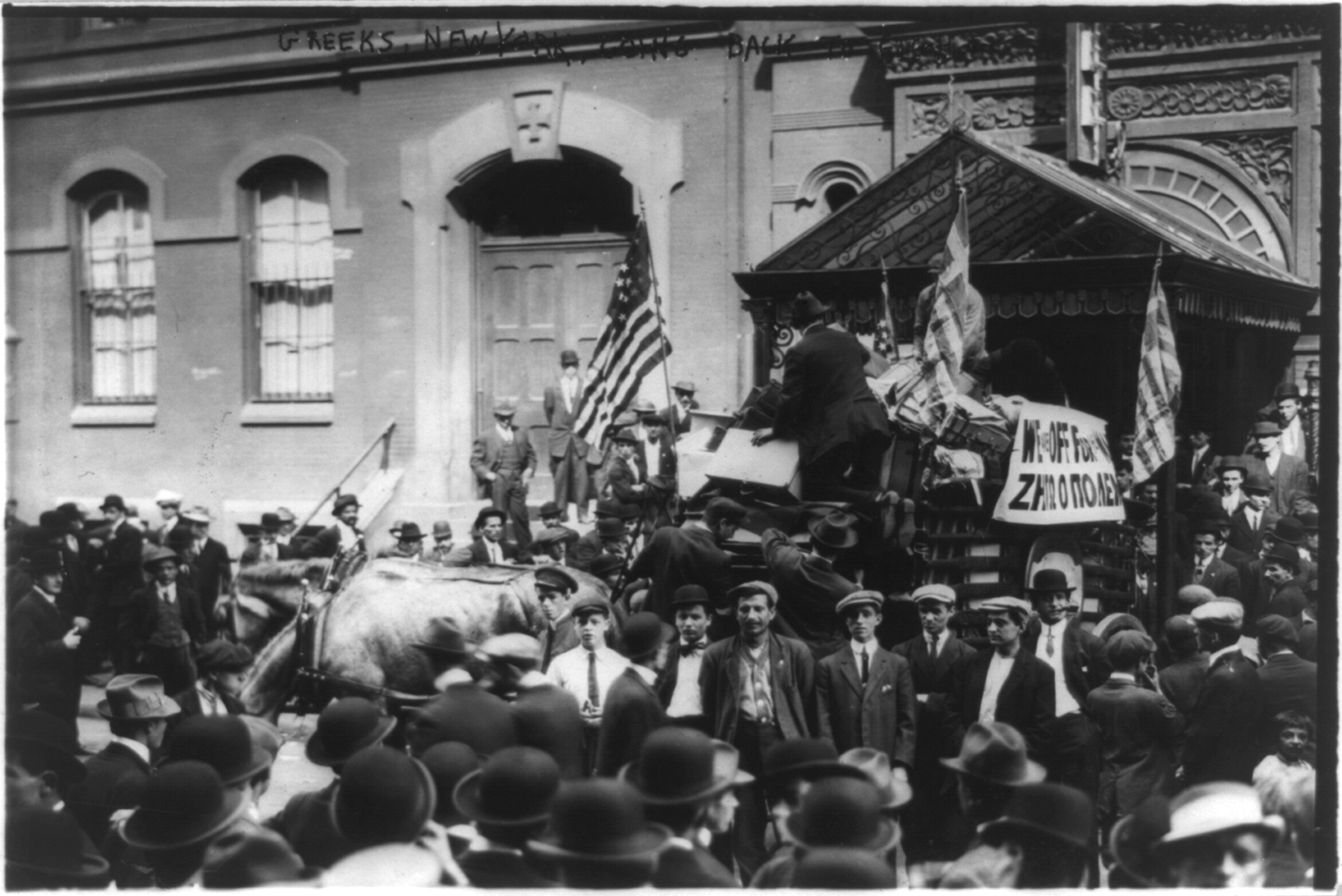
Greek Americans return as volunteers to Greece on the outbreak of the First Balkan War, New York, October 1912.

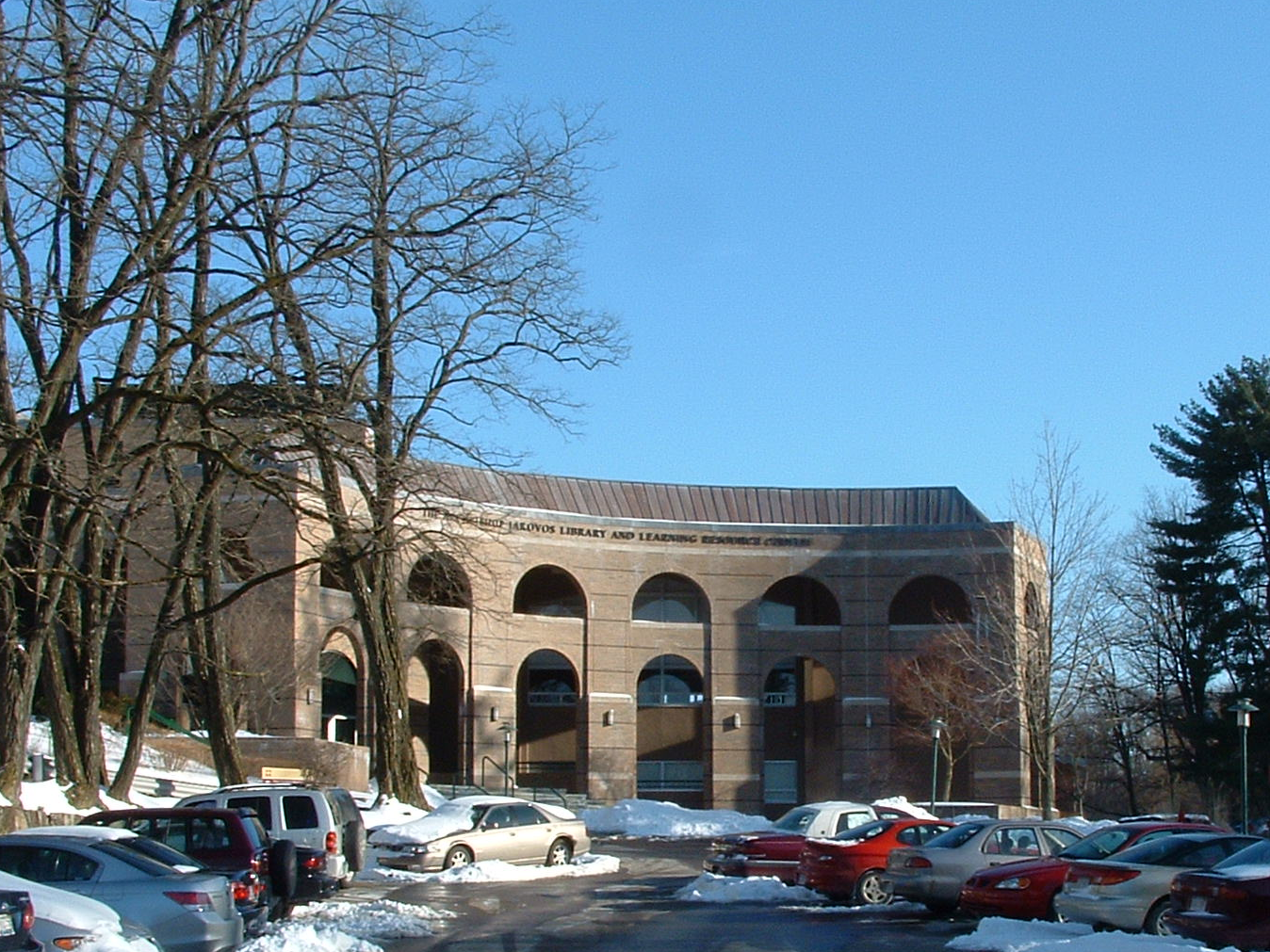
Archbishop Iakovos Library, Hellenic College and Holy Cross Greek Orthodox School of Theology, Brookline, Massachusetts, USA.

From 1825 to 1828, the U.S. Navy conducted anti-piracy operations against Greek pirates in the Aegean Sea.

The first draft of the Monroe Doctrine in 1823 included praise of the Greek rebels in their revolt against the Ottoman Empire. American opinion strongly supported Greece. However, Secretary of State John Quincy Adams strongly objected and that passage was dropped. The final text indicated the U.S. government had no intention of interfering in European affairs. However, as Angelo Repousis shows, private citizens including philanthropists, missionaries, and political activists, inspired by a vision of ancient Greece, were eager to become involved in Greek affairs.

On 9 November 1837, the United States recognized the independence of Greece when the American Minister at London signed a treaty of Commerce and Navigation with the Greek Minister at London. That act marked the first negotiation of the United States with Greece and represented the U.S. recognition of Greece as in the independent country in the early 1800s. The same year, the first American Consul Gregory Anthony Perdicaris took up his position in Athens. The mid-19th-century treaty established the Greek-U.S. relations in part to help liberate and establish Greece as a separate country from the Ottoman Empire.

=== World Wars ===
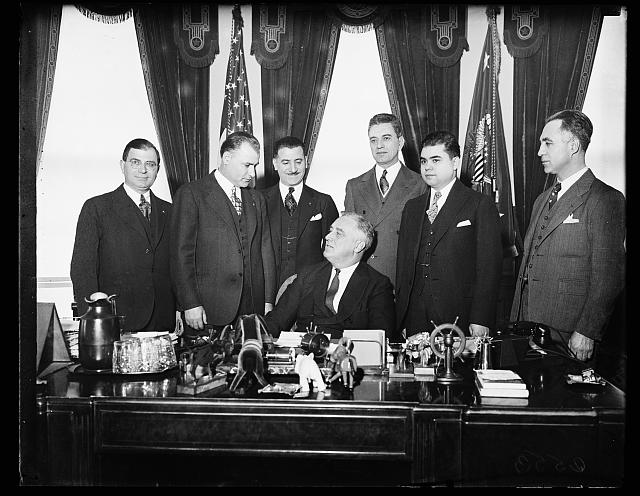
President Franklin Roosevelt in meeting with members of the order of AHEPA (American Hellenic Educational Progressive Association), 1936

In 1914, on the eve of the First World War, the U.S. Navy sold two war-ready battleships to Greece, the former U.S.S. Idaho and Mississippi, which were renamed the Kilkis and Lemnos. The ships ensured Greece kept its naval superiority in the Aegean against Turkey, which was threatening to reclaim the islands it had lost during the Balkan Wars. The sale of the ships was arranged by the Wilson Administration, including then Assistant Secretary of the Navy Franklin D. Roosevelt, with Congressional authorization.

The U.S. was active in providing humanitarian aid to Greece after the devastation it suffered in World War I.

During World War II, the U.S. opposed the British plan to restore King George II of Greece to the throne because he was closely associated with fascism. Instead, the U.S. helped to establish a regency but did not oppose British efforts to defeat the communist insurgents.

The British took a leading role in helping the Greek government fight the insurgency. When its financial crisis forced it to cut back, the British turned that role over to the U.S. in 1947, until the end of the Greek Civil War in 1949.

=== Truman Doctrine ===
The U.S. had largely ignored Greece since it was in the British sphere but lent $25 million on easy terms in 1946. However, it complained that its financial system was chaotic. The far left boycotted elections in March 1946 that were held under international supervision. The US judged them fair and supported the new conservative government, just like the plebiscite that brought back King George II. Behind the scenes, American diplomats tried to convince the government to end corruption. Fighting broke out in 1946, with the communist element receiving arms and bases of support across the border in Yugoslavia. London secretly informed Washington in February 1947 that its funding would run out in a matter of weeks. A crisis was at hand, and the U.S. decided to act decisively.

Administration leaders, believed that the Eastern Mediterranean was ripe for an armed communist takeover since Britain had to withdraw its forces and its money from Greece. In the Greek Civil War, communist partisans, who had been organized to fight the Germans, were by 1946 strongly supported by the Tito's Yugoslavia but received no support from the Soviet Union. If the Communists won, Turkey, with its large but weak and antiquated army, would be at very high risk.

Truman won bipartisan support in March 1947 for the Truman Doctrine, which gave $300 million in military and economic aid to Greece and $100 million to Turkey. They were grants, not loans. Truman declared to Congress on 12 March:

It must be the policy of the United States to support free peoples who are resisting attempted subjugation by armed minorities or by outside pressures.

In a larger sense, the Truman Doctrine formalized a policy of Soviet containment in which the United States would oppose the further spread of Communism. The policy meant rejecting any rollback strategy to end communist rule where it already existed.

The United States also contributed hundreds of millions of dollars to rebuild Greece's buildings, agriculture, and industry as part of the Marshall Plan.

Tito's split with Stalin and American aid helped the Greek government and Army to win the war; by 1949, the government forces had won the civil war. Greece joined NATO in 1952.

=== Postwar ===
The U.S. provided Greece with more than $11.1 billion in economic and security assistance after 1946. Economic programs were phased out by 1962, but military assistance continued. In the fiscal year 1995, Greece was the fourth-largest recipient of U.S. security assistance, receiving loans totaling $255.15 million in foreign military financing.

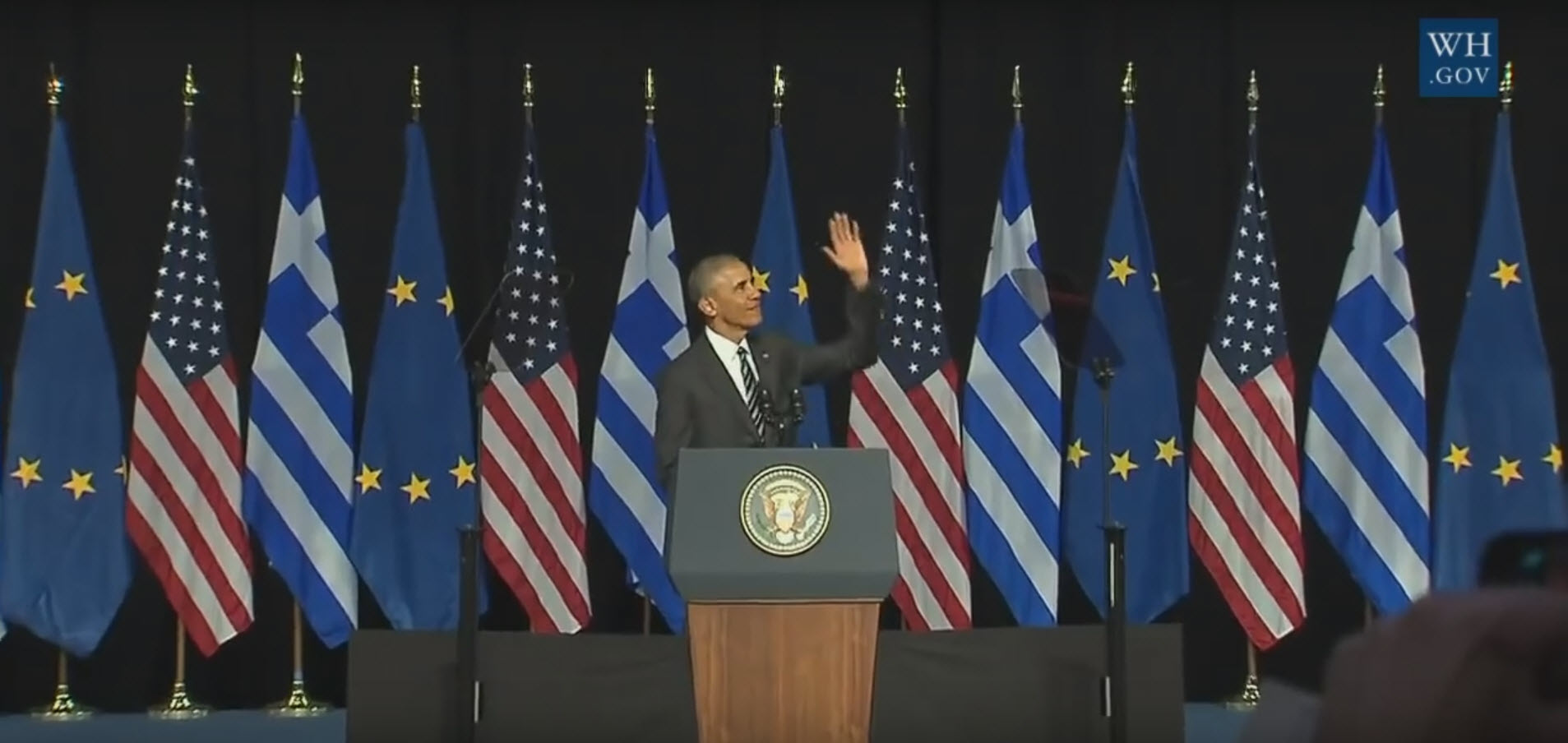
Barack Obama's visit in Athens, 2016

In 1953, the first defense cooperation agreement between Greece and the United States was signed, providing for the establishment and operation of American military installations on Greek territory. The current "mutual defense cooperation agreement" provides a continued U.S. military support to Greece and the operation by the U.S. of a major military facility at Souda Bay, Crete.

Relations between the two countries were later strained by the Cyprus dispute and after the end of the Greek junta, which particularly the Greek left considered to be backed by the U.S. In 1974, Greece temporarily left the military branch of NATO to protest the Turkish invasion of Cyprus. In 1980, it rejoined the military branch and remained a close (albeit not as close as pre-1974) US-ally during the remainder of the Cold War.

=== Truman statue in Athens ===
A 12-foot bronze statue of Harry S. Truman was erected in Athens in 1963, with the help from Greek-Americans. It is one of only eight statues of American presidents outside the United States. The statue has been a focal point of anti-Americanism in Greece. It has been toppled over several times, painted and vandalized. In March 1986, it was destroyed by a dynamite bombing by a group considering it as being a symbol of American imperialism. The statue was restored within a year by the government although it had originally been refused by the Athens City Council. More recently in April 2018, a group of students tried to topple the statue during a communist anti-American protest but were stopped by riot police.

== Trade and foreign direct investment ==
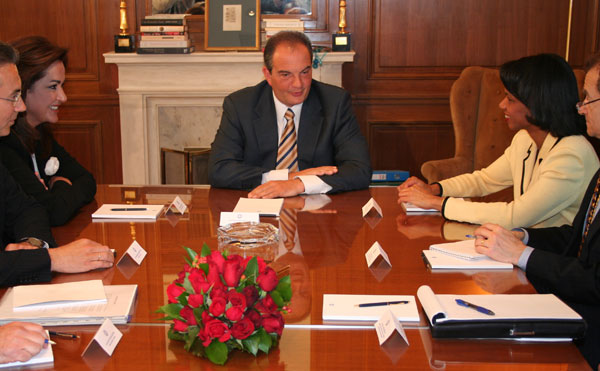
Meeting of the Secretary of State Condoleezza Rice, Greek Foreign Minister Dora Bakoyannis (left) and Greek Prime Minister Kostas Karamanlis (center) at Maximos Mansion in Athens

Mainly the Greek products exports to the United States involve petroleum products, cement, tobacco, fur products, olive oil, marble, clothing articles, steel products, pipes, and refractory products. On the other hand, U.S. imports to Greece mostly are industrial and agricultural products and machinery, telecommunications equipment, computers and electronic equipment, timber, medical and pharmaceutical items, machinery and parts, skins, and wood-pulp. Even though the United States imposed restrictions on the importation of certain fresh or processed agricultural products, there is full freedom of sale of Greek industrial products in the whole U.S. market. The EU-United States Agreement signed in May 1993 allows Greek enterprises access to U.S. public contracts. Trade between the two countries amounted to nearly a billion US dollars in 2010. Due to the Credit Crunch Crisis of 2008 that has negatively affected the Greek economy, thousands of U.S. firms have shifted their productive activities from other Balkan countries and Italy to Greece due to lower costs of production. The Greece-US Economic & Commercial Cooperation Committee (ECCC) is also currently working to bilaterally expand trade flow and cooperation, and widen their market in Southeastern Europe, the Black Sea and the Middle East.

== Military collaboration ==
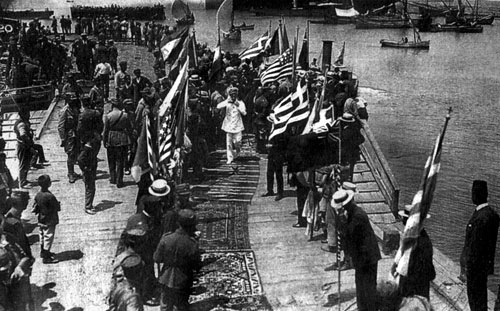
American and Greek troops landing at Panormos (July 1920) during the Greco-Turkish War

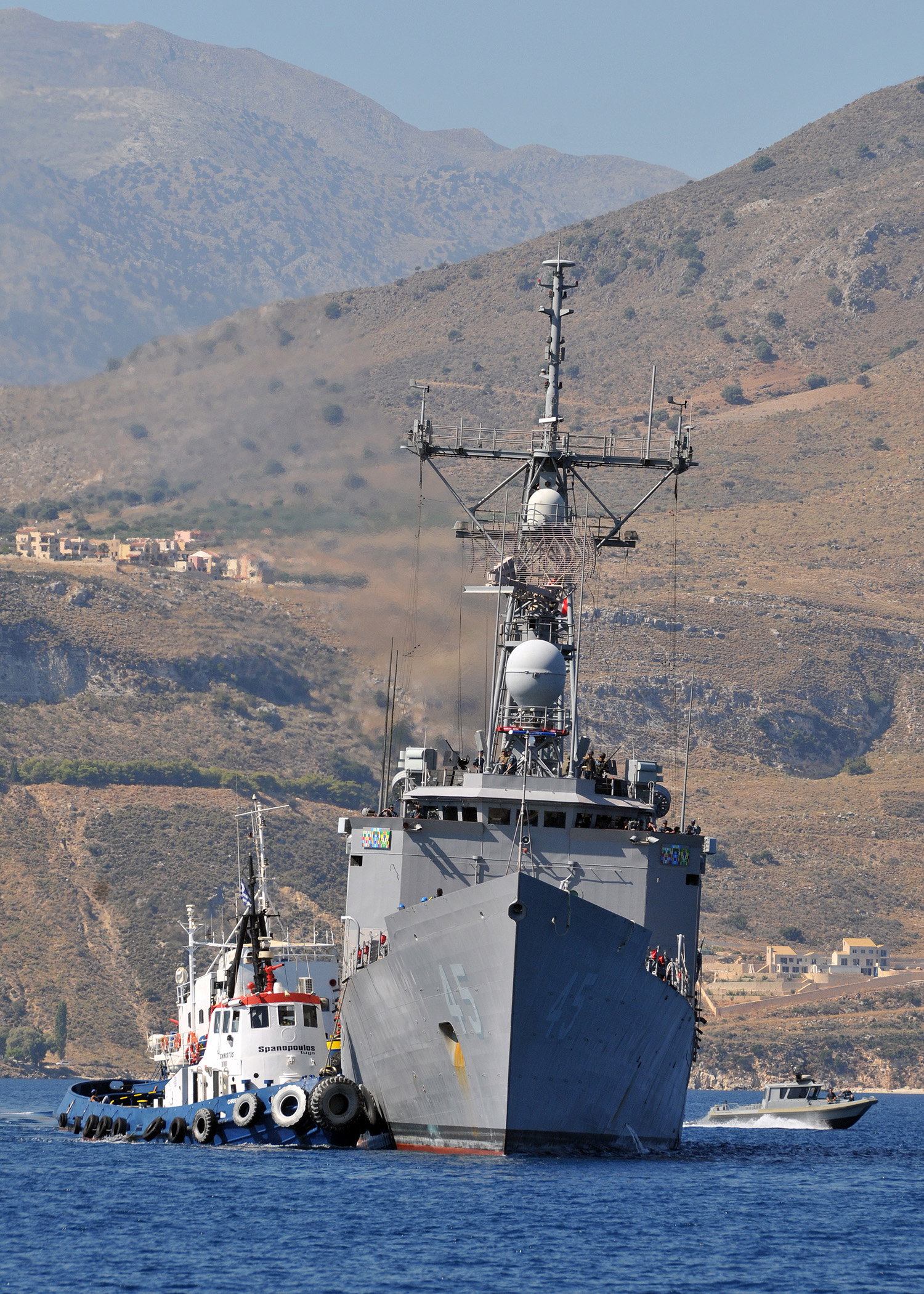
The Oliver Hazard Perry-class guided-missile frigate USS De Wert (FFG 45) arrives for a port visit to Crete on 24 August 2011

Bilateral Greek-U.S. military relations can be dated back to the early 19th century when Greeks were fighting for their independence against the Ottoman Empire. During the movement of philhellenism, the two nations found commonality under their values of freedom and democracy, while many American philhellenes went also to help in Greece.

Military collaboration stemming from wars like World War I and World War II have set the foundation for the two countries as firm allies. Greece and the U.S. have also been allies through the Cold War as well as conflicts in Bosnia, Kosovo, and Afghanistan within this past century.

The U.S.-Greek Defense Industrial Cooperation Agreement, which was signed on 8 September 1983, regulates defense and intelligence relations between Greece and the United States. A revised and expanded Defence Cooperation Agreement was signed in 2019, with the aim of enhancing the close defense ties between the two countries. During the Gulf War collaboration strengthened relations between Greece and the United States, as Greece sent military and medical assistance to the U.S. forces in the Gulf region. In May 1995 Greece Defence Ministry organized the "NEW SPIRIT 95" military exercises in the area of Karditsa as a mean to foster military cooperation between Greece, Albania, Romania, Bulgaria and the United States. In parallel, exchange of visits between high-level political and military officials to the two countries such as that of Condoleezza Rice to Athens reinforced cooperation between Greece and the United States in the areas of fighting against terrorism and the war against drugs. Additionally the port of Thessaloniki is open to NATO exercises in the Eastern Mediterranean and Greece has been a main contributor to NATO operations in Afghanistan, including counterterrorism and counter-piracy maritime efforts. Greece and the U.S. are also allies in the War of Terror and are closely cooperating in the coalition for the fight against the Islamic State, with Greece providing technical and arms support to the U.S.-led coalition in its efforts to drive out ISIL from Iraqi and Syrian territories.

The armies of the two countries, the United States Armed Forces and the Hellenic Armed Forces, also participate in large-scale military drills which are taking place in the Mediterranean region, while Crete's naval base at Souda Bay in Greece, serves as the largest and most prominent naval base for the United States in the eastern Mediterranean. Additionally, the Souda Bay base features the only deep water port in the entire Southern European and Mediterranean regions that is suitable and capable for maintaining the largest aircraft carriers, making it of vital importance for the broader security in the region, with the only other such options available for the US Navy being Norfolk in the United States and Dubai in the Persian Gulf. In 2019, the two have signed a revised defense pact, which American officials described as critical to responding to security challenges in the Eastern Mediterranean Sea. The deal provides for increasing joint U.S.-Greece and NATO activity at Larissa, Stefanovikio, and Alexandroupoli as well as infrastructure and other improvements at the Crete Naval Base.

On 6 November 2020, Greece raised an official request to the United States for the acquisition of 18-24 stealth multi-role F-35 fighter jets from the year 2021.

On 13 October 2021, Greece and the United States upgraded their defense pact, signing an agreement that allows expanded access for US troops to train and operate from four additional bases in Greece indefinitely. Greece also has a bilateral maritime defense pact with France, and the parties hold these to be complementary to NATO.

== Mutual membership to international organizations ==
Both Greece and the United States share membership in various international organizations with most important being the United Nations, NATO, Euro-Atlantic Partnership Council, Organization for Security and Cooperation in Europe, Organisation for Economic Co-operation and Development, International Monetary Fund, World Bank, and World Trade Organization. Additionally Greece has been a permanent observer to the Organization of American States.

== Greek-American community ==
External videos
- Greek Genocide memorial United Nations plaza 1993

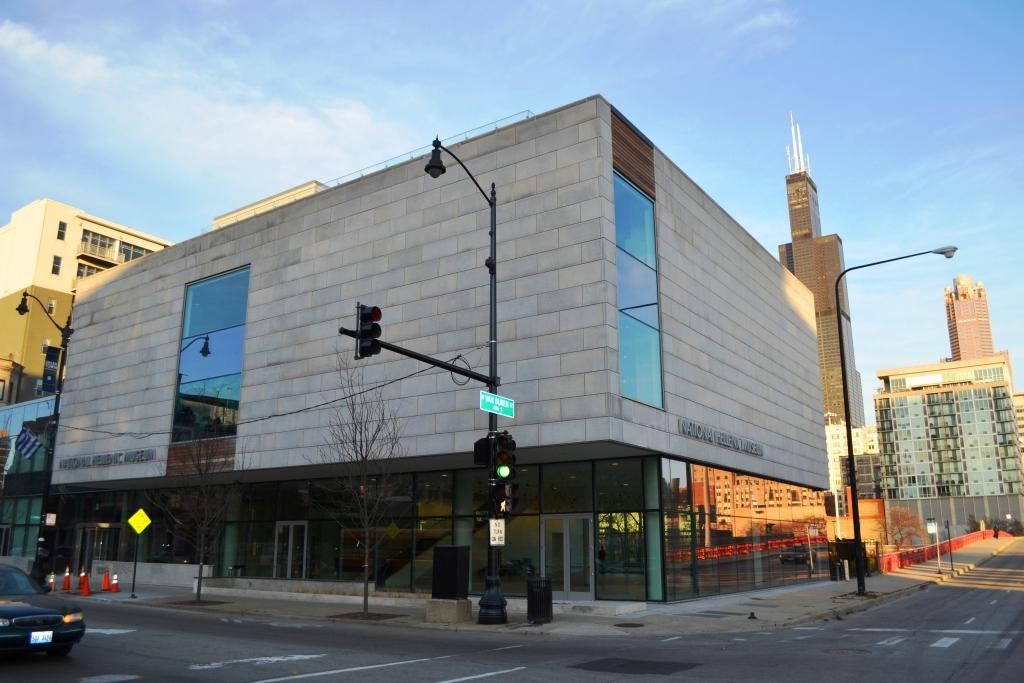
The new National Hellenic Museum, Chicago

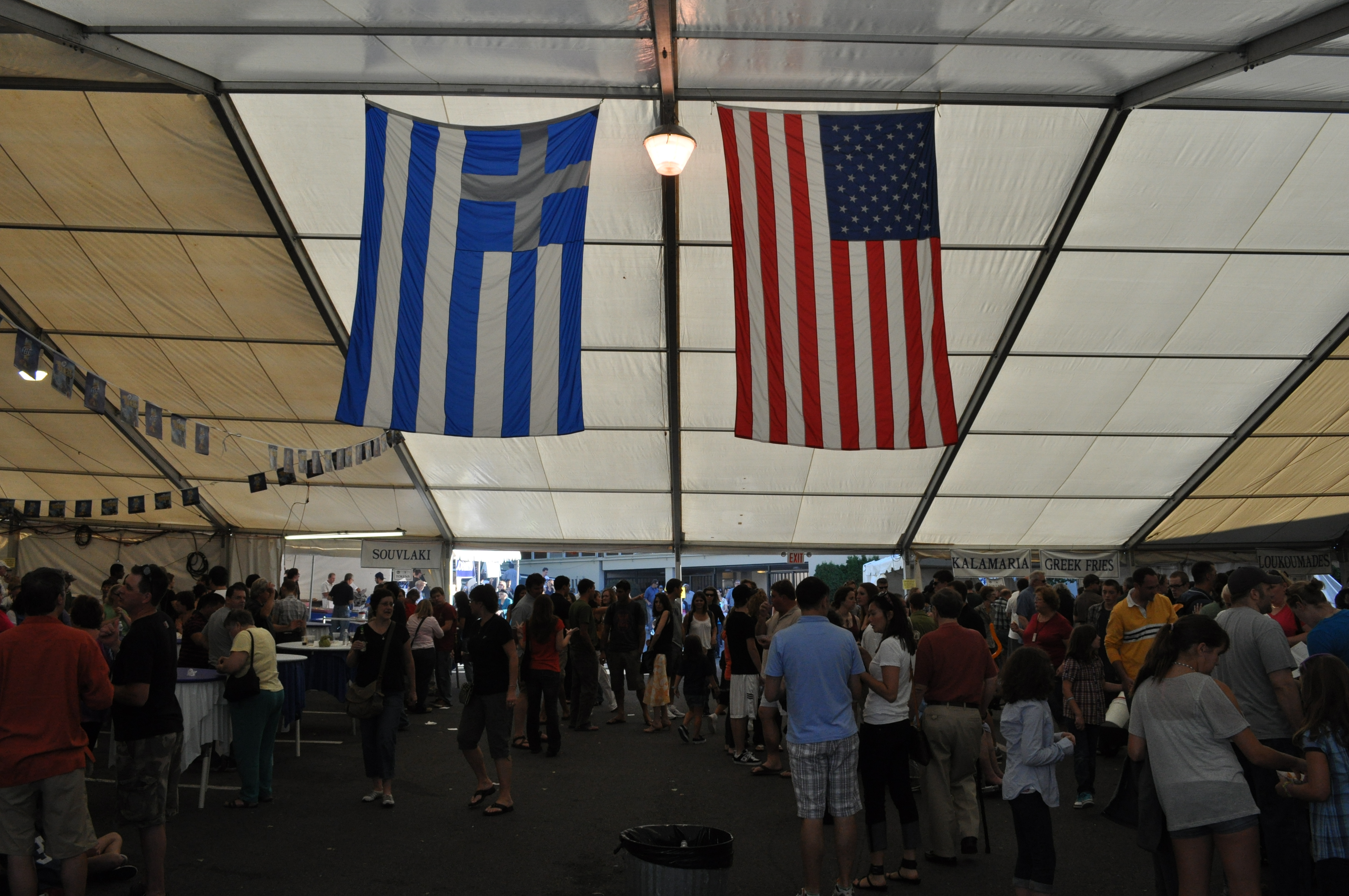
Greek festival in Seattle

The earliest Greek immigrants date back to the 1760s, although the first significant Greek community was not established until the 1850s in New Orleans, LA. The first Greek consulate and Greek Orthodox Church in the US were founded in New Orleans as well. Immigration of Greeks into the US was at its peak in 1945 after damage of the World Wars and Greek Civil War had left their economy in ruins. After admittance of Greece into the EU in 1981, immigration of Greeks into the US greatly decreased. As of 1999 there were 72,000 Greek-Americans who had migrated to Greece, but now those number might be minimal due to the current economic crisis in the EU and Greece. The 2000 US Census showed 1,153,295 Greeks living in the US. About 3 million Americans are of Greek ancestry.

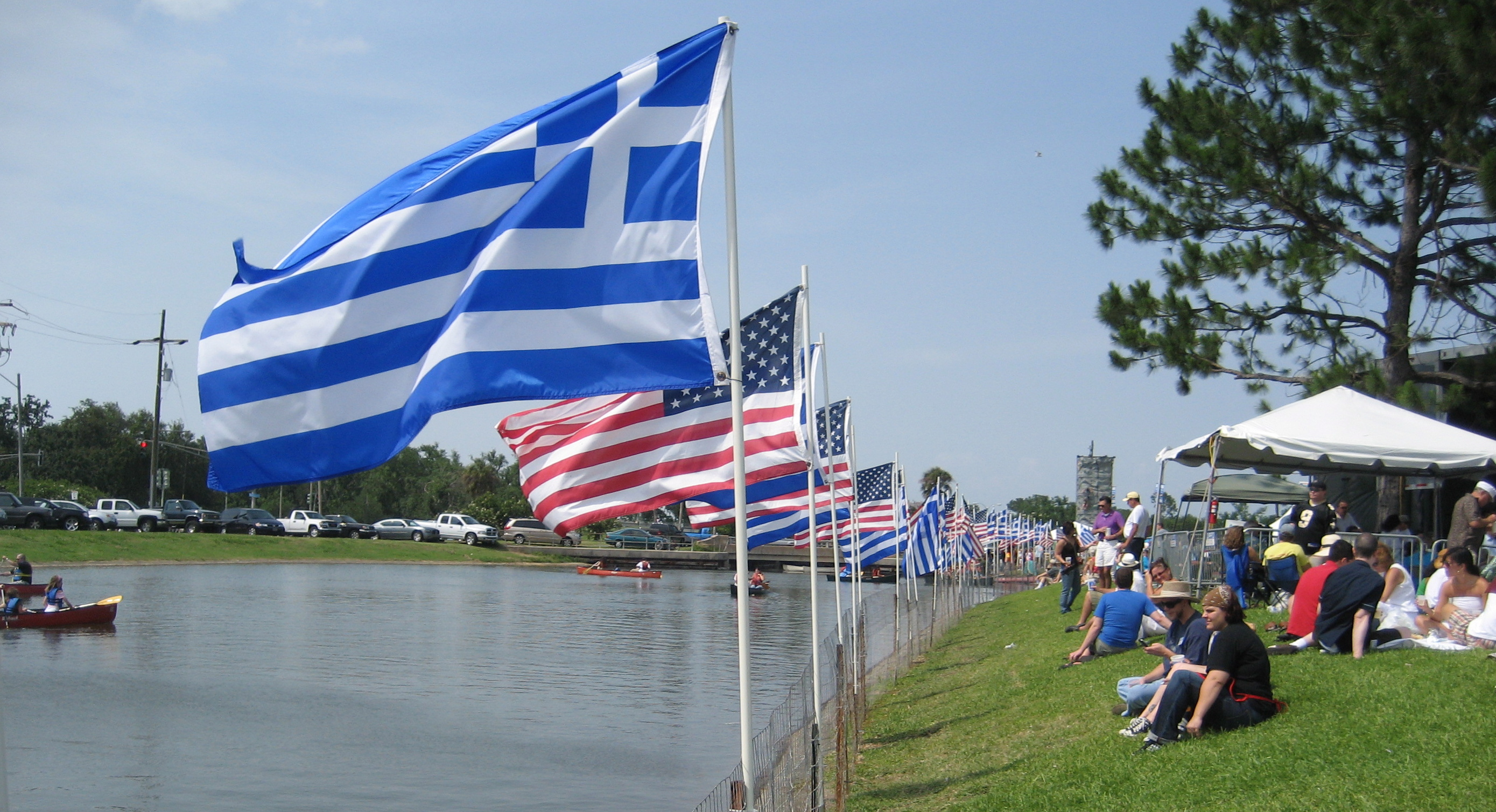
Greek festival in New Orleans

=== Greek American Public Officials ===
Greek-Americans are an established, well-organized community in the U.S. Several notable former politicians include former Vice-president Spiro Agnew, Senators Olympia Snowe, Paul Sarbanes and Paul Tsongas, and 1988 Presidential candidate and former Massachusetts Governor Michael Dukakis. There are currently 7 Greek Americans serving in the U.S. Congress: Representatives Chris Pappas, Gus Bilirakis, Dina Titus, Nicole Malliotakis, Mike Haridopolos, Maggie Goodlander, and Jimmy Patronis.

=== Greek American lobby in the United States ===
Greek American lawyers, lobbyists, public relations specialists work in various organizations in Washington, D.C. and across the nation, such as the American Hellenic Institute and AHEPA, to promote U.S. relations with Greece. This includes a decades long presence of public advocacy directed at the U.S. Congress, the Department of State, the White House, and other government institutions. The Greek American lobby has a history of cooperation with other national lobbies in the United States, most notably being the Israeli lobby and to a lesser extent the Armenian lobby.

== Heads of Governments visits ==
Guest	Host	Place of visit	Date of visit
(United States) President Dwight D. Eisenhower	(Greece) Prime Minister Konstantinos Karamanlis	Maximos Mansion, Athens	14–15 December 1959
(Greece) Prime Minister Konstantinos Karamanlis	(United States) President John F. Kennedy	White House, Washington, D.C.	April, 1961
(Greece) Prime Minister Georgios Papandreou	(United States) President Lyndon B. Johnson	White House, Washington, D.C.	June, 1964
(United States) President George H. W. Bush	(Greece) Prime Minister Konstantinos Mitsotakis	Maximos Mansion, Athens	18–20 July 1991
(Greece) Prime Minister Konstantinos Mitsotakis	(United States) President George H. W. Bush	White House, Washington, D.C.	17 November 1992
(Greece) Prime Minister Andreas Papandreou	(United States) President Bill Clinton	White House, Washington, D.C.	April, 1994
(United States) President Bill Clinton	(Greece) Prime Minister Costas Simitis	Maximos Mansion, Athens	19–20 November 1999
(Greece) Prime Minister Costas Simitis	(United States) President George W. Bush	White House, Washington, D.C.	January 2002
(Greece) Prime Minister Kostas Karamanlis	(United States) President George W. Bush	New York City	18–23 May 2004
(United States) Secretary of State Condoleezza Rice	(Greece) Foreign Minister Dora Bakoyannis	Maximos Mansion, Athens	April 2006
(Greece) Prime Minister George Papandreou	(United States) President Barack Obama	White House, Washington, D.C.	March 2010
United States Vice President Joe Biden	(Greece) Prime Minister Antonis Samaras	Maximos Mansion, Athens	June 2011
United States Secretary of the Treasury Jack Lew	(Greece) Finance Minister Yannis Stournaras	Athens	June 2013
(Greece) Prime Minister Antonis Samaras	(United States) President Barack Obama	White House, Washington, D.C.	August 2013
(Greece) Foreign Minister Evangelos Venizelos	(United States) Secretary of State John Kerry	State Department, Washington, D.C.	August 2013
(Greece) Prime Minister Alexis Tsipras	(United States) President Barack Obama	New York City	September 2015
(United States) Secretary of State John Kerry	(Greece) Foreign Minister Nikos Kotzias	Athens	December 2015
United States Secretary of the Treasury Jack Lew	(Greece) Finance Minister Euclid Tsakalotos	Athens	July 2016
(United States) President Barack Obama	(Greece) Prime Minister Alexis Tsipras	Maximos Mansion, Athens	15–16 November 2016
(Greece) Prime Minister Alexis Tsipras	(United States) President Donald Trump	White House, Washington, D.C.	17 October 2017
(Greece) Prime Minister Kyriakos Mitsotakis	(United States) President Donald Trump	White House, Washington, D.C.	January 2020
(United States) Secretary of State Mike Pompeo	(Greece) Foreign Minister Nikos Dendias	Thessaloniki	28 September 2020
(Greece) Prime Minister Kyriakos Mitsotakis	(United States) President Joe Biden	White House, Washington, D.C.	16–17 May 2022

== Resident diplomatic missions ==
of Greece in the United States

- Washington, D.C. (Embassy)
- Boston (Consulate-General)
- Chicago (Consulate-General)
- Los Angeles (Consulate-General)
- New York City (Consulate-General)
- San Francisco (Consulate-General)
- Tampa (Consulate-General)
- Atlanta (Consulate)
- Houston (Consulate-General)

of the United States in Greece

- Athens (Embassy)
- Thessaloniki (Consulate-General)

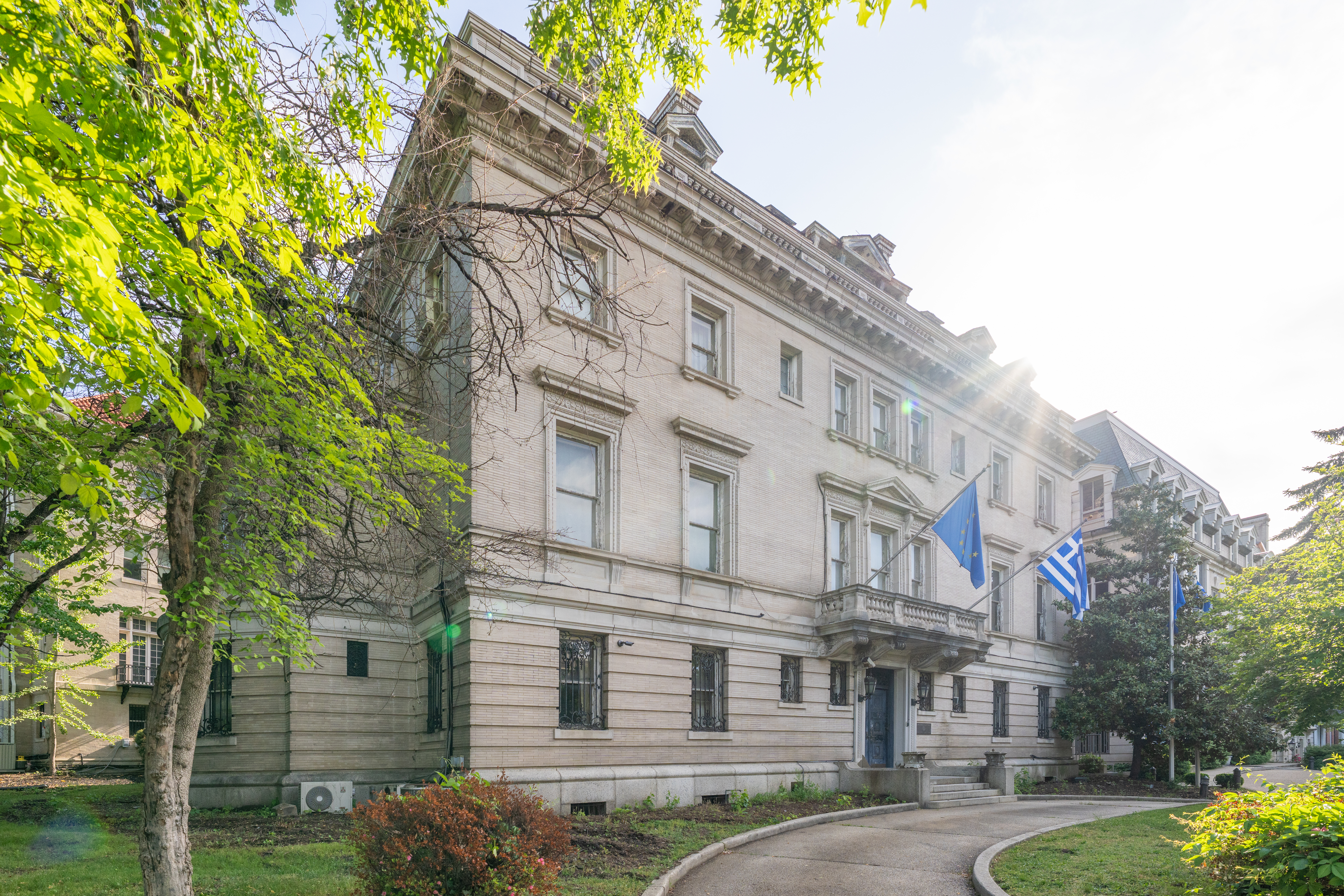
Embassy of Greece in Washington, D.C.

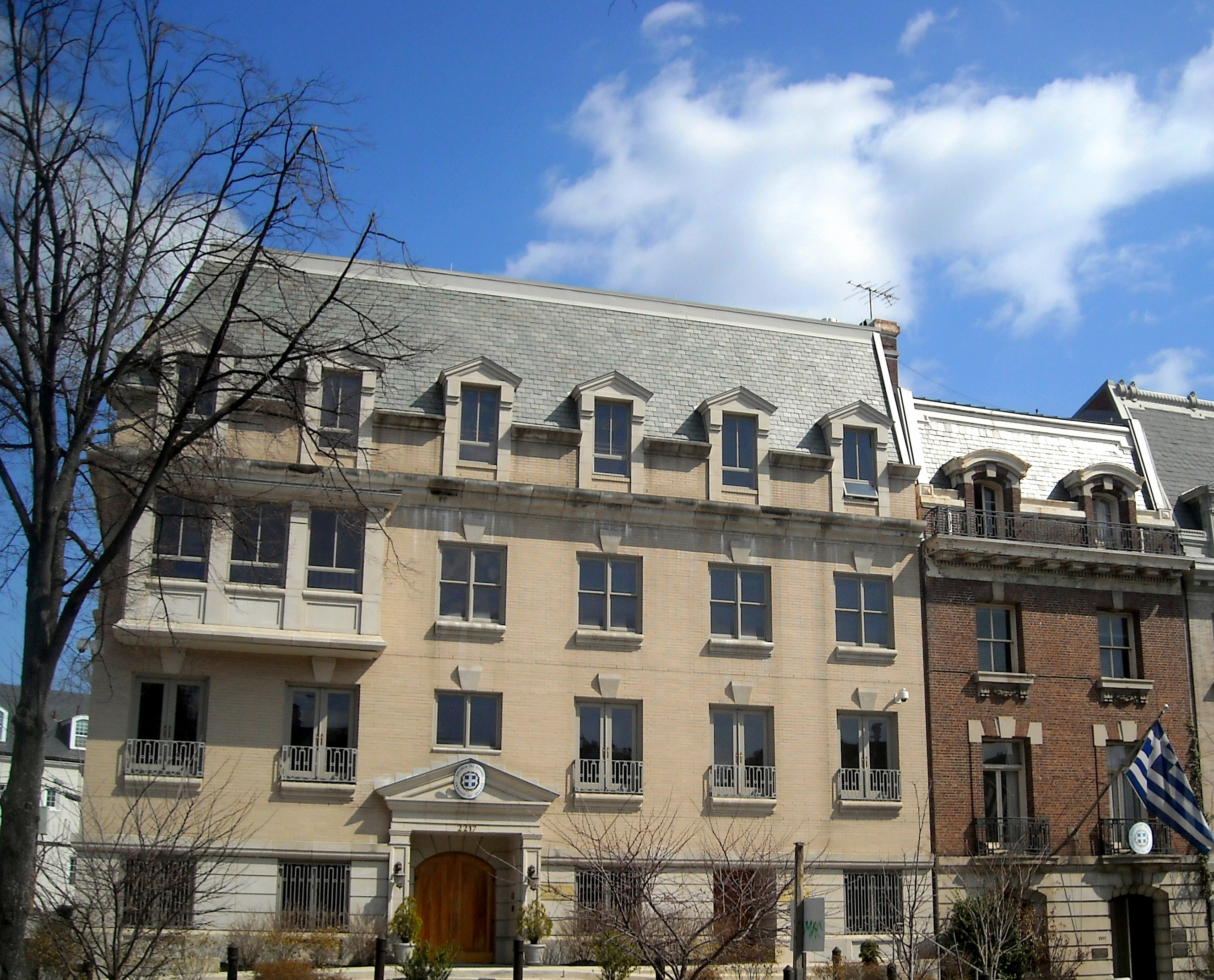
Consular Section of Greece in Washington, D.C.

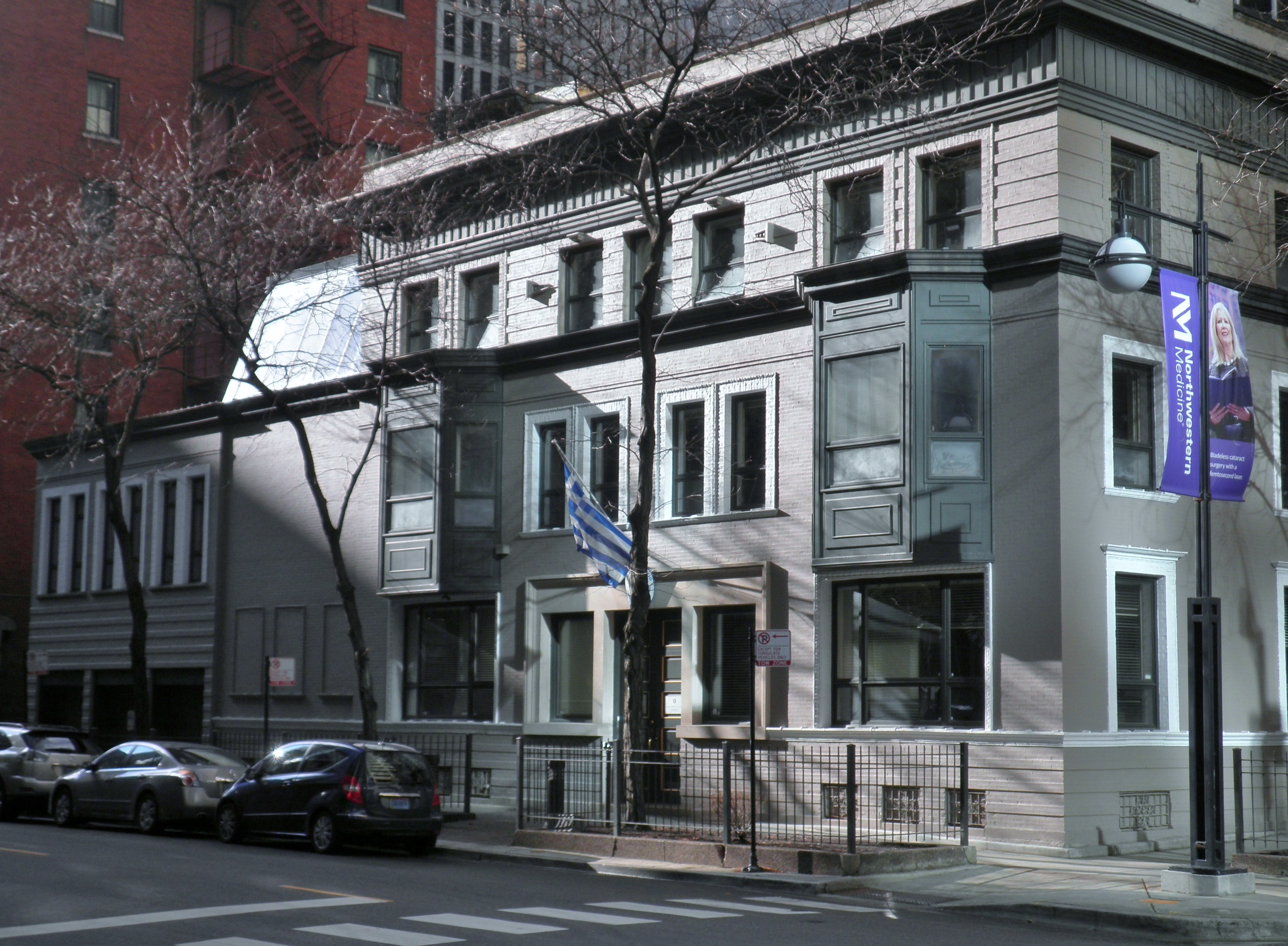
Consulate-General of Greece in Chicago

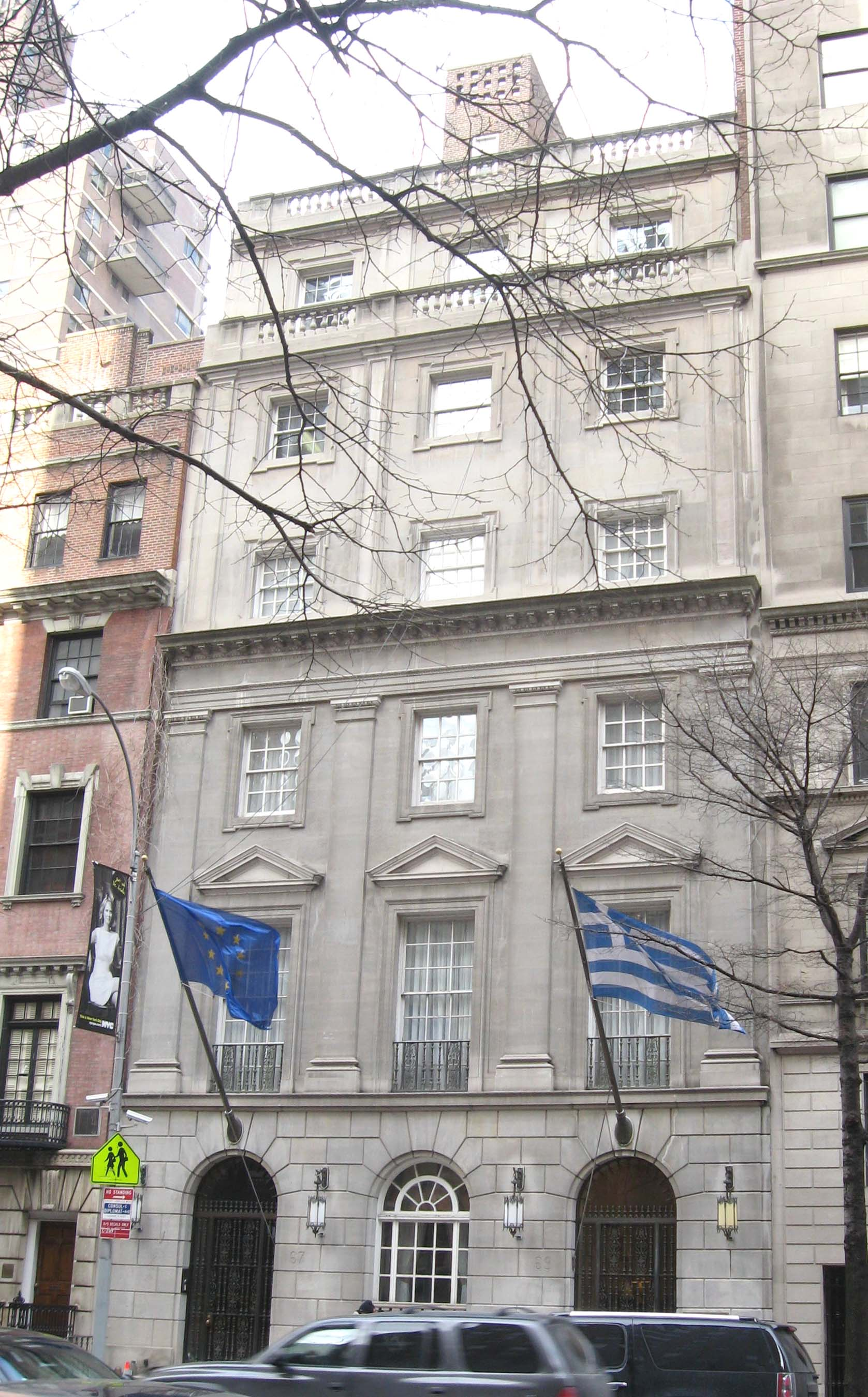
Consulate-General of Greece in New York City

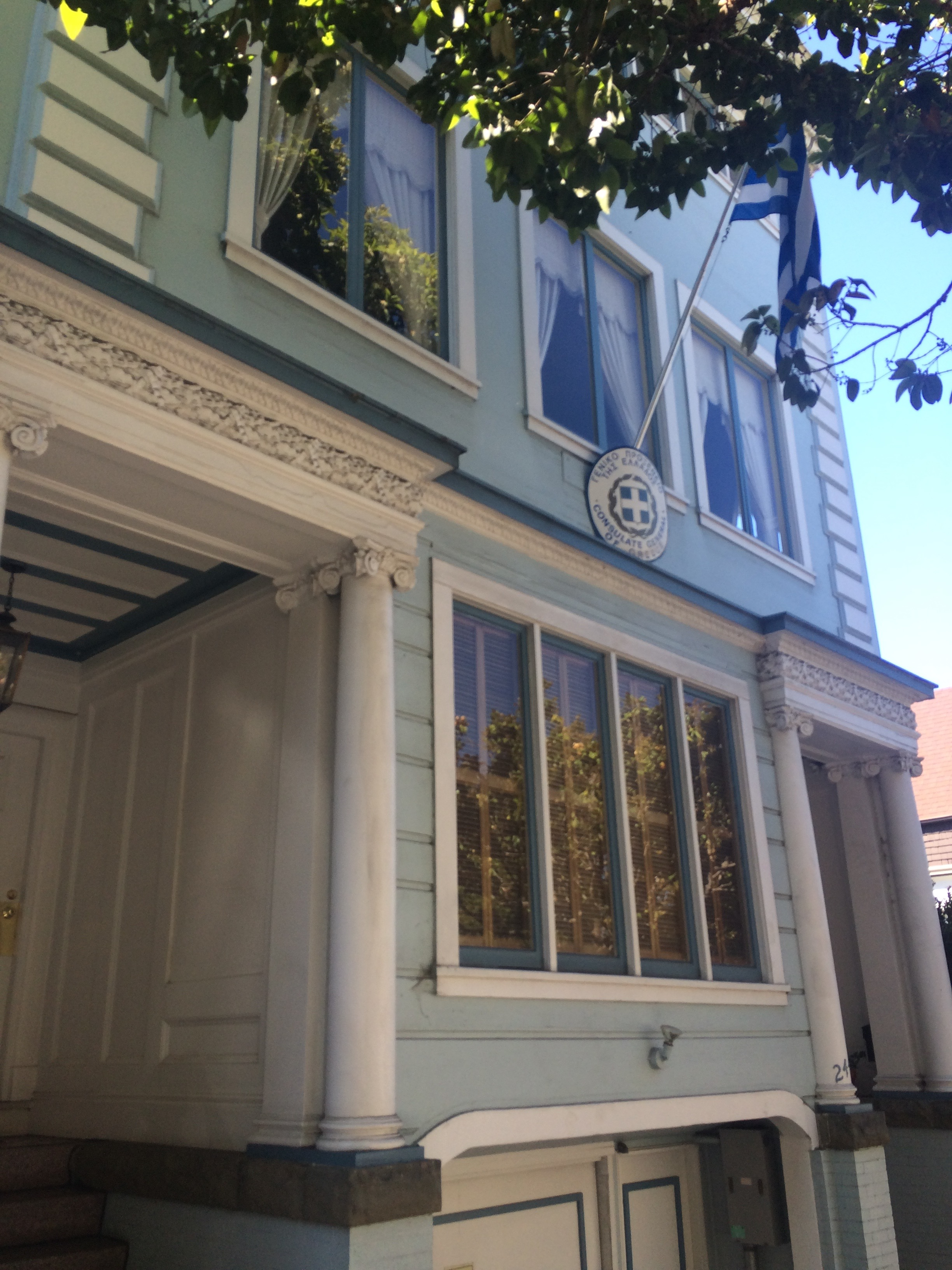
Consulate-General of Greece in San Francisco
Embassy of the United States in Athens

== "Peace Council" ==
In January 2026, Greece was formally invited by Donald Trump to be a founding member in the "Peace Council" for Gaza. In response to the invitation, Greek Foreign Minister Giorgos Gerapetritis said that Greece will revie the offer based on UN Security Council Resolution 2803 adding "we envision the Mediterranean not as a region doomed to conflict, but as a region of peaceful coexistence of all its peoples and future generations."

== Public opinion ==
In 2005 67% of Greeks viewed the United States favorably, in 2016 the figure was 76%. The poll also showed that consistently from 2005 to 2016 more than 90% of Greeks viewed American people positively, one of the highest figures in the world. A 2024 poll showed that a majority of Greeks viewed the role and stance of the United States of America towards Greece positively, making the U.S. more popular than in any of the other Western European countries surveyed by YouGov. According to a 2026 Pew Research Center survey, 37% of Greek people had a favorable view of the United States, while 60% had a negative view.

Americans view Greece very favorably too, with 67% viewing Greece positively while only 4% view it negatively. This makes Greece one of the most liked countries in America, placing it just 1% behind the United Kingdom but solidly above Germany and France.

On October 7, 2026, a protest against the visit of U.S. Secretary of State Marco Rubio to Greece was held in central Athens. About 1,500 people gathered to protest his visit and the war in Iran, chanting “American killers!”

== See also ==
- Foreign relations of Greece
- Foreign relations of the United States
- Greek Americans
- Greece lobby in the United States
- US–EU relations
- EU–NATO relations
