= Crete Naval Base =

Naval base of the Hellenic Navy and NATO in Greece

Crete Naval Base Ναύσταθμος Κρήτης
- Souda Bay, Crete, Greece
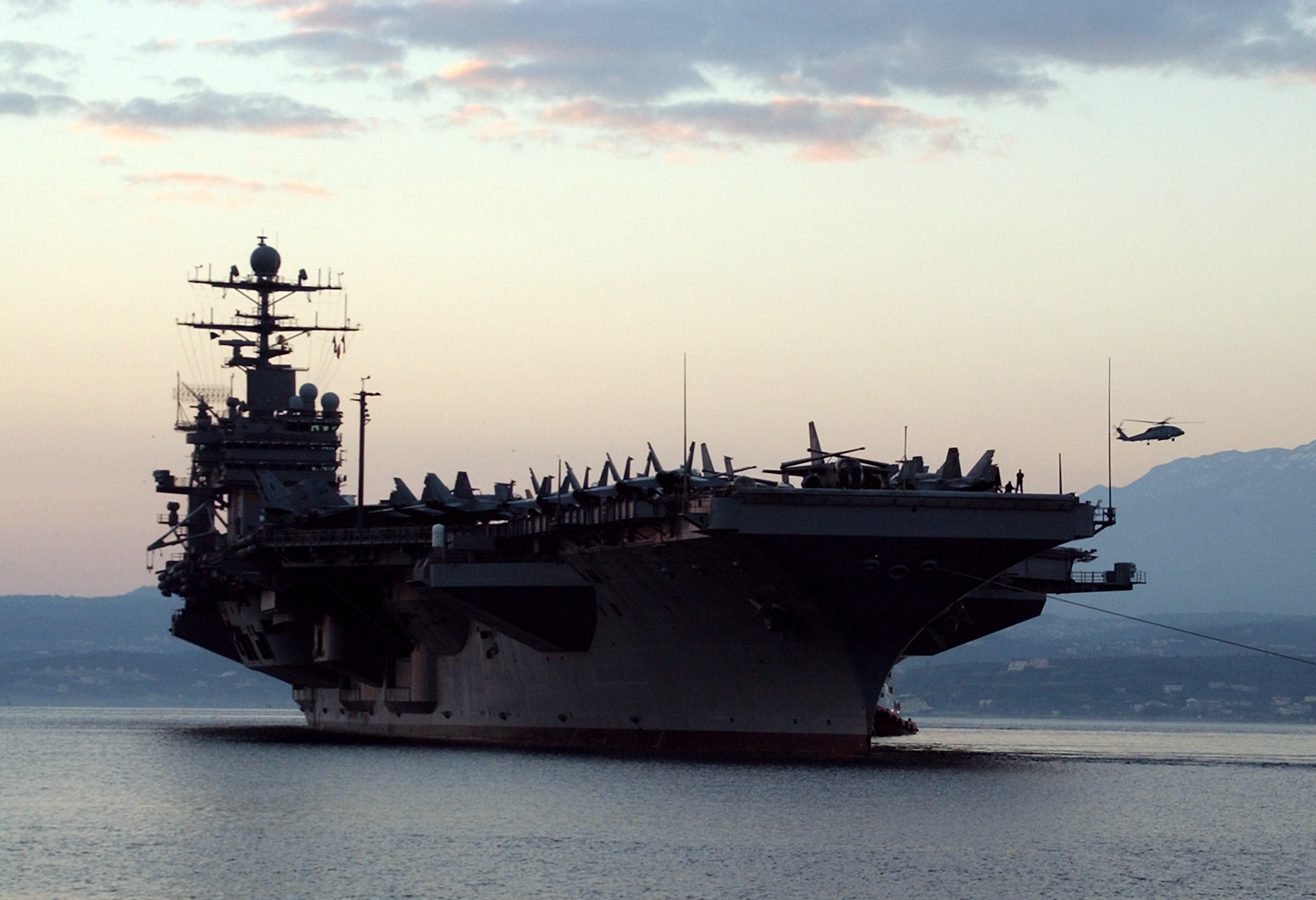
- The Nimitz-class aircraft carrier USS Theodore Roosevelt (CVN-71) arrives at Souda Bay, Greece.

- Logo of the Hellenic Navy's Crete Naval Base

Site information
- Owner: Greece
- Controlled by: Hellenic Navy Allied Maritime Command (NATO)

Location
- Location of Crete Naval Base, Greece
- Coordinates: 35°29′46.5″N 24°08′51.5″E

Site history
- Built: 1951
- Built by: Greek Government
- In use: 1951 – present

Garrison information
- Current commander: Commodore John Sarigiannis
- Garrison: 2nd Branch - DDΜΝ - Hellenic Navy General Staff

Crete Naval Base (Greek: Ναύσταθμος Κρήτης, Nafstathmos Kritis) is a major naval base of the Hellenic Navy and NATO at Souda Bay in Crete, Greece.

Formally known in NATO as Naval Support Activity, Souda Bay (NSA-Souda Bay), and more commonly in Greece as the Souda Naval Base (Greek: Ναυτική Βάση Σούδας, Naftiki Vasi Soudas), it serves as the second largest (in numbers of warships harboured) naval base of the Hellenic Navy and the largest and most prominent naval base for NATO in the eastern Mediterranean Sea. Additionally, it features the only deep water port in Southern Europe and the Mediterranean Sea that is suitable and capable of maintaining the largest aircraft carriers (class "supercarriers"). The only other such options available for the US Navy are Naval Air Station North Island in San Diego, California, and Norfolk Naval Station and Puget Sound Naval Shipyard in the United States and the Port of Jebel Ali, Emirate of Dubai, in the Persian Gulf.

== History ==
Souda bay's history dates back to the Minoan period, as it is located close to Aptera, that is mentioned in Linear B. The area remained significant throughout the Classical, Hellenistic, and Roman periods as the city overlooks Souda bay. The bay itself is deep and naturally protected harbor formed between peninsulas and surrounded by hills. The larger area around Aptera was given to the temple of Patmos at the end of the 1100s, becoming one of its most important lands. In the 1200s, after Crete was handed over to the Venetians, the Gulf of Souda was used to dispose of enemy armies.

From the 1200s to the 1800s, Crete, then known as Candia, was under Venetian and later Ottoman rule. During the period of the Republic of Venice, the island became an important naval outpost, with the Venetians fortifying nearby positions to defend the bay from pirates and competing empires. Following the Ottoman conquest of Crete, control passed to the Ottomans, who continued to use the bay as a strategic military harbor in 1872.

In the late 1800s, as the Ottoman Empire weakened, the Great Powers including Britain, France, Russia, and Italy, established a presence in Souda Bay. Crete eventually became part of Greece in 1913, and the bay soon emerged as one of the country's most important naval locations.

During World War II and the Battle of Greece, the harbor was the target of an Italian raid against the Allied navy as part of the Mediterranean Campaign.

After the war, the naval base was founded, around the same period with Greece's entry into the North Atlantic Alliance.

On 23 March 2026, it was reported that the USS Gerald R. Ford, following its operation in the 2026 Iran war, had returned to the naval port for maintenance, after two crew members were reported injured.

== Facilities ==
The Naval Base of Souda Bay occupies an area of 500 hectares (1,200 acres), including the old artillery barracks of the Hellenic Army's 5th Infantry Division as well as later land acquisitions. The facilities include a dry dock, workshops, a fuel depot and an ammunition depot. The Naval Station is commanded by a Commodore or Captain of the Hellenic Navy. The Forward Logistics Site Souda Bay (FLS Souda Bay) was under the operational control of NATO's Allied Naval Forces Southern Europe (COMNAVSOUTH), until 2013. Since then, it is under the control of the Allied Maritime Command (MARCOM) which replaced NAVSOUTH. The Hellenic Navy radio communications station SXH has also been located at Mournies, near Souda, since 1929. The Κ-14, a deep-water quay, is the only one of its kind in the Mediterranean Sea that allows the aircraft carriers to dock.

Since 2007, the Souda Bay Naval Base is host of the NATO Maritime Interdiction Operational Training Centre (ΝMIOTC), which is located at the Northern Sector of the base (Marathi).

== Based units ==
Since 2020, USS Hershel "Woody" Williams, a Lewis B. Puller-class expeditionary mobile base, of the United States Navy, is deployed to Crete Naval Base.

== Gallery ==
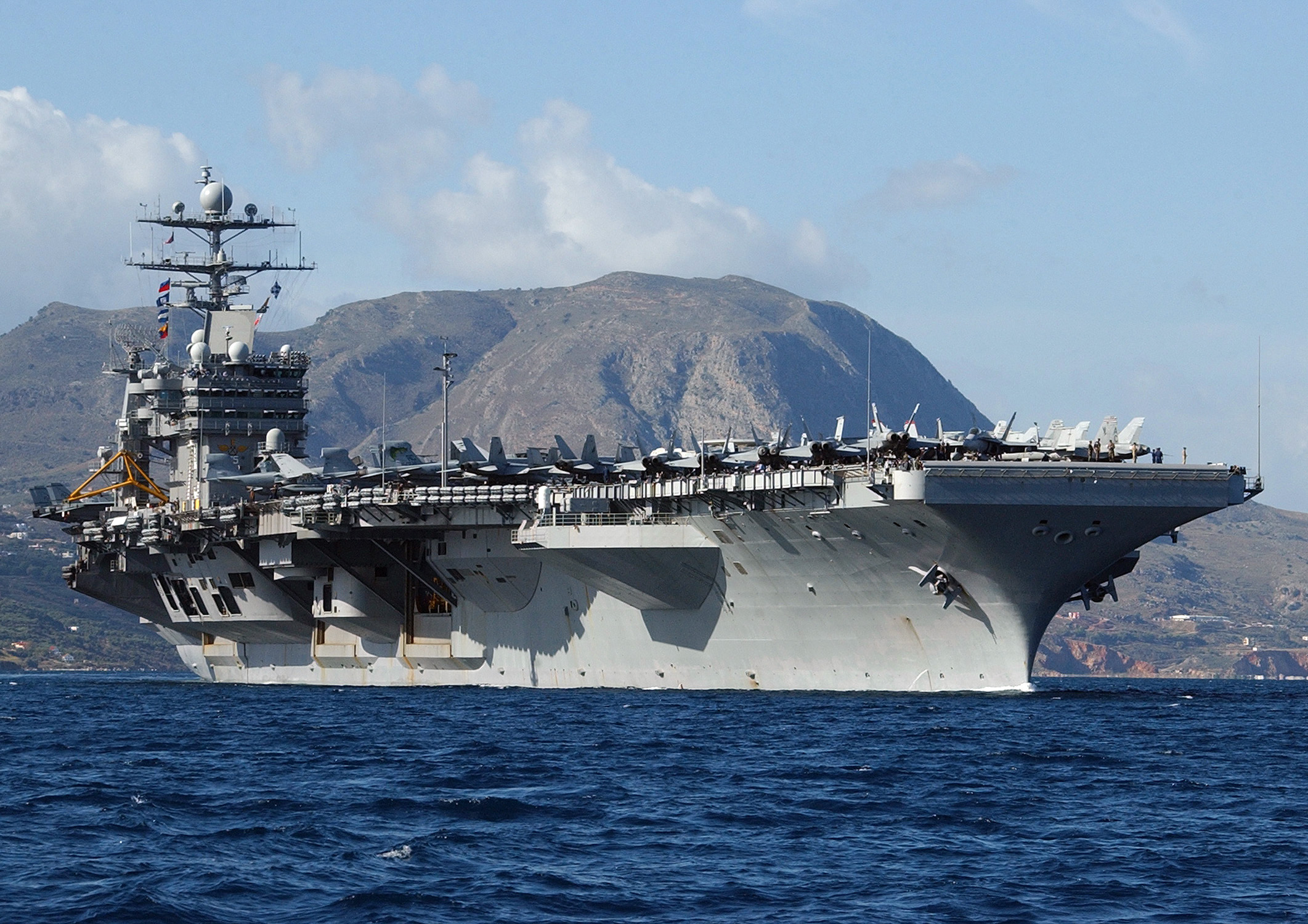
The American aircraft carrier USS Harry S. Truman (CVN-75) sails out of the Souda Bay harbor in Crete, Greece, following a four-day port visit to Greece's largest island.

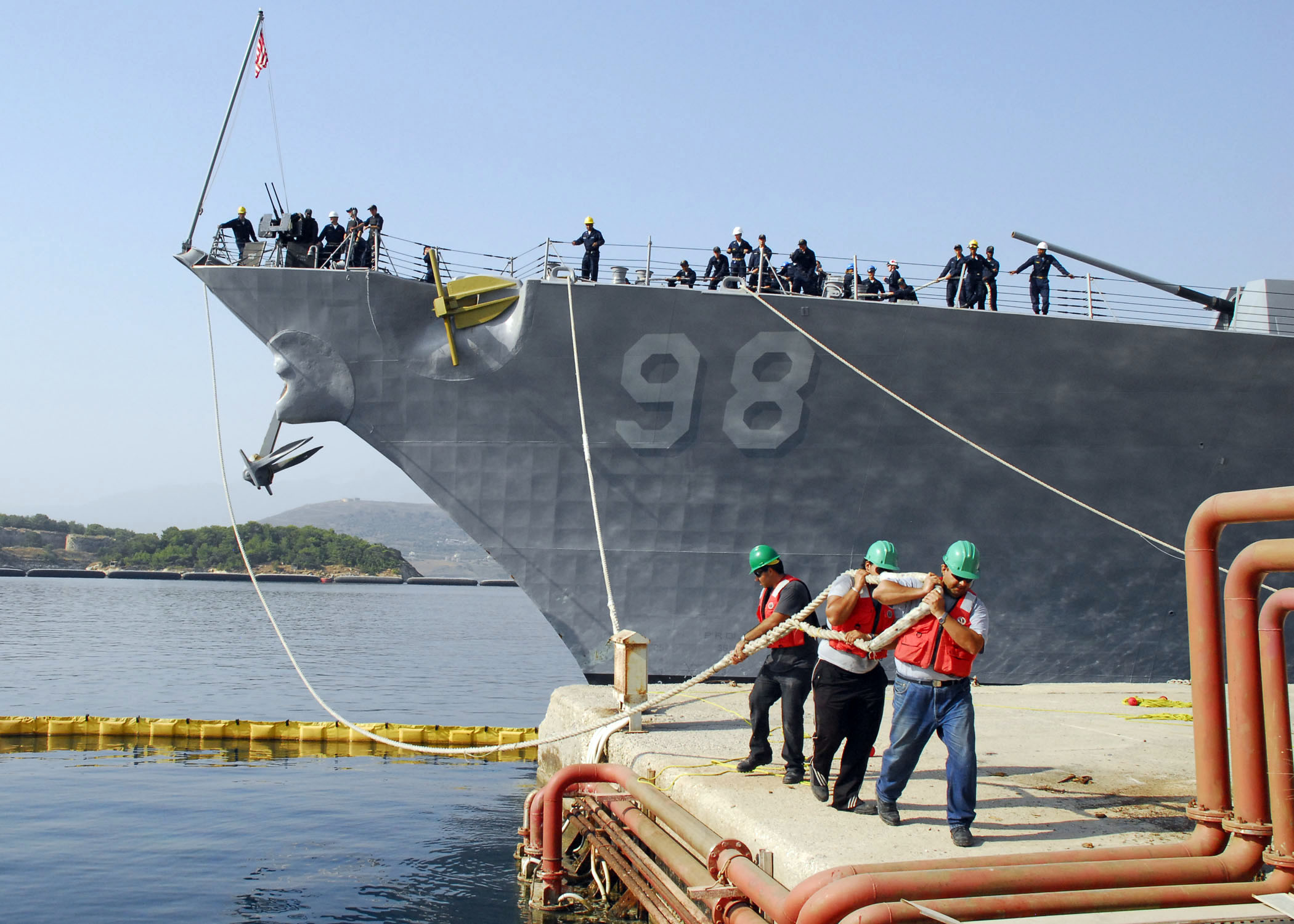
Greek line handlers assist as Arleigh Burke-class guided-missile destroyer USS Forrest Sherman (DDG-98) arrives in Greece for the first port visit of her maiden deployment.

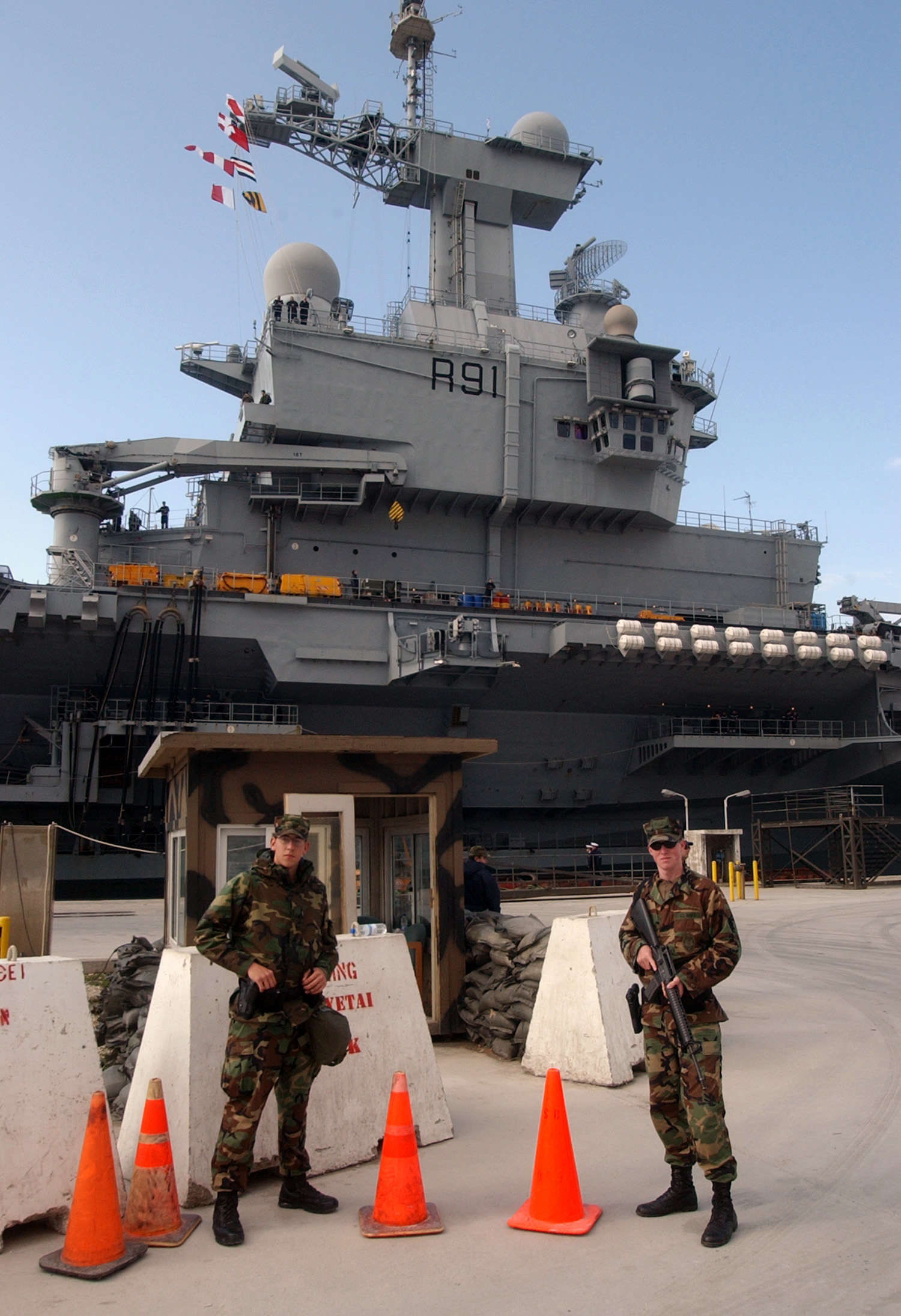
The Naval Support Activity Souda Bay's Security Department soldiers stand a security watch in front of the French aircraft carrier FS Charles DeGaulle (R 91) as it docks at the Marathi NATO pier facility in Souda Bay.

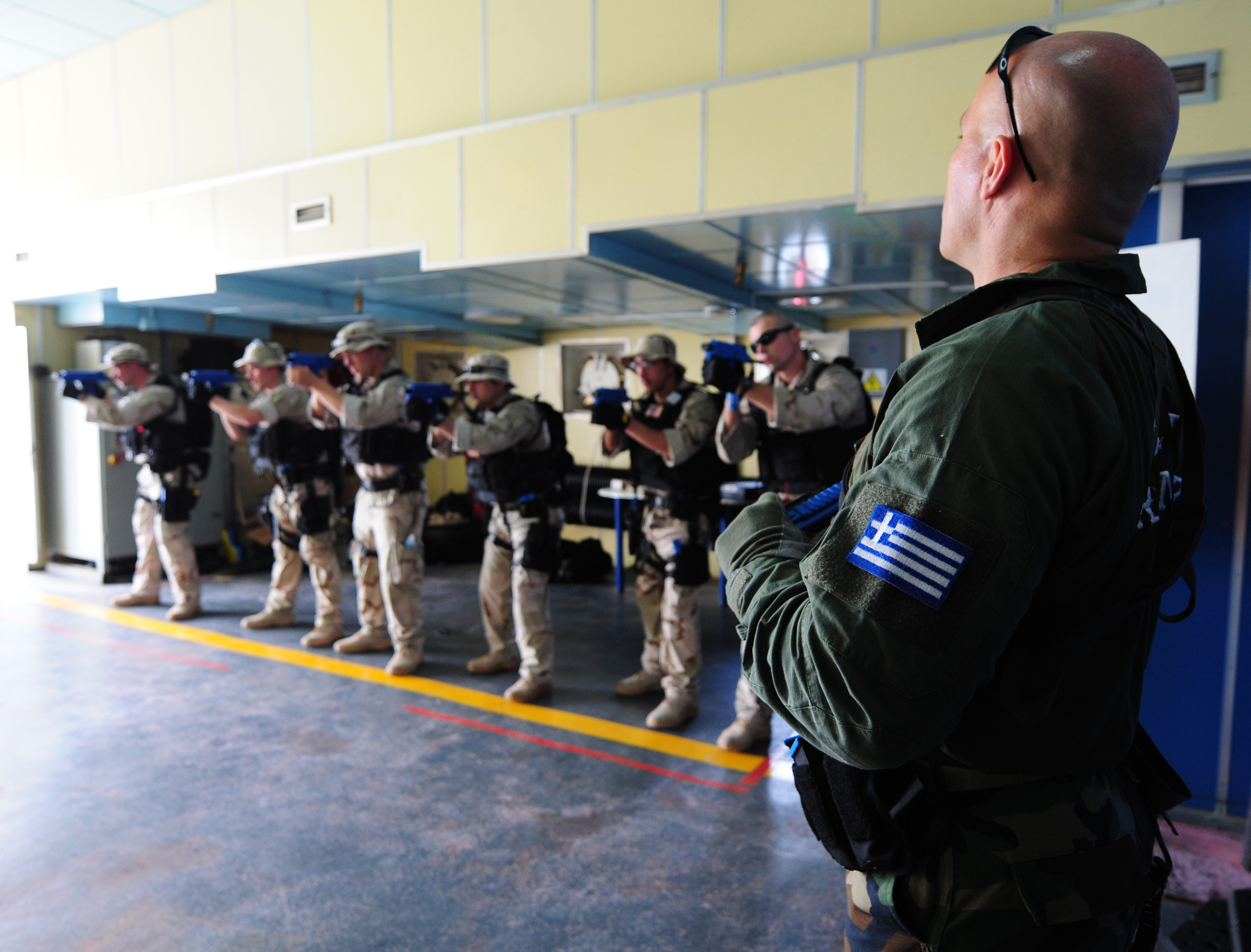
A Hellenic navy special operations forces instructor, right, conducts small arms training with U.S. Sailors aboard the Hellenic navy training ship Aris (A-74) at the NATO Maritime Interdiction Operational Training Centre in Souda Bay, Crete

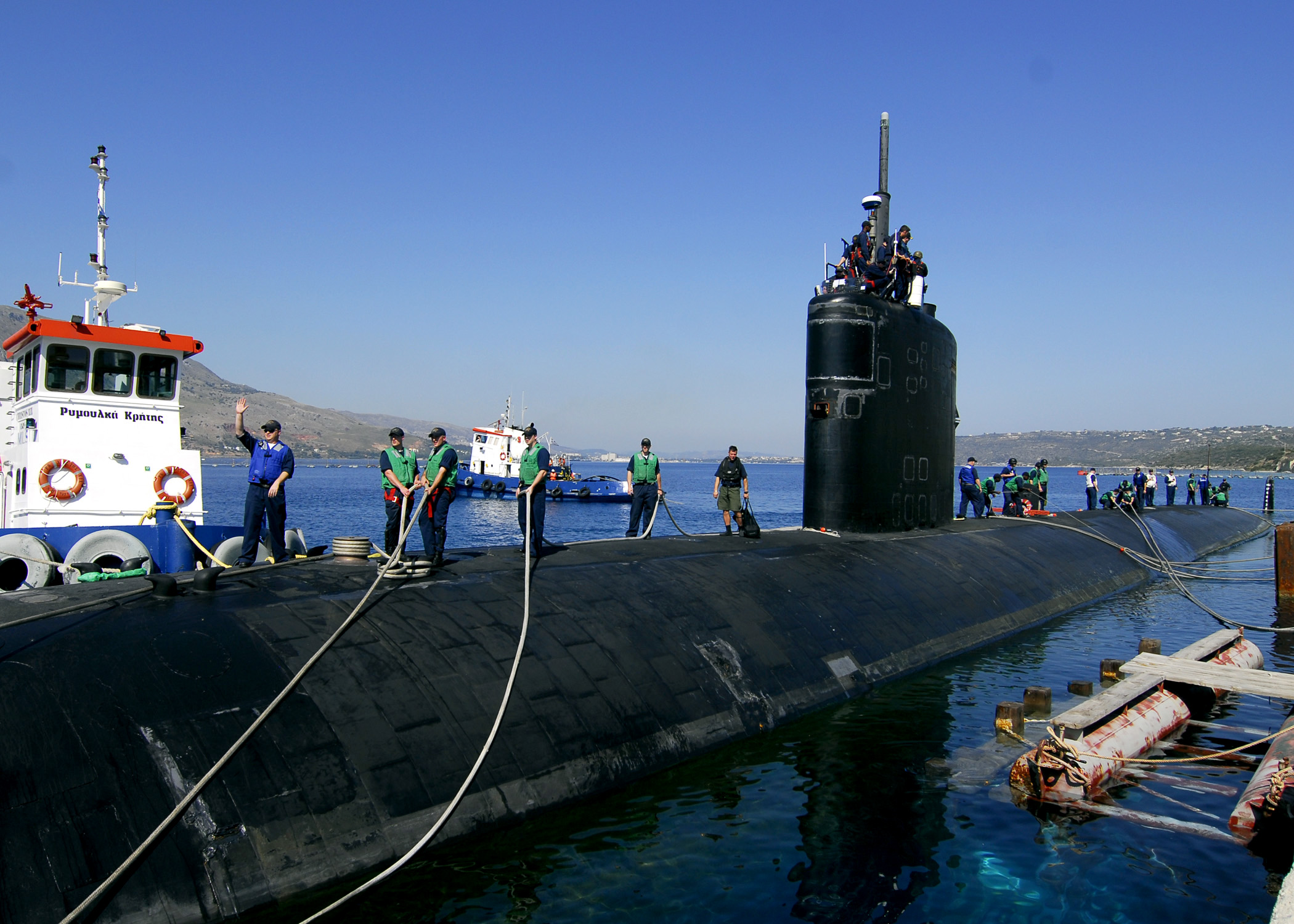
Sailors conduct mooring operations as the fast-attack submarine USS Albany (SSN-753) arrives in Souda Bay for a routine port visit.

== See also ==
- List of United States Navy installations
- Greece-United States relations
