= Gene Rossides =

American football player, lawyer, and politician (1927–2020)

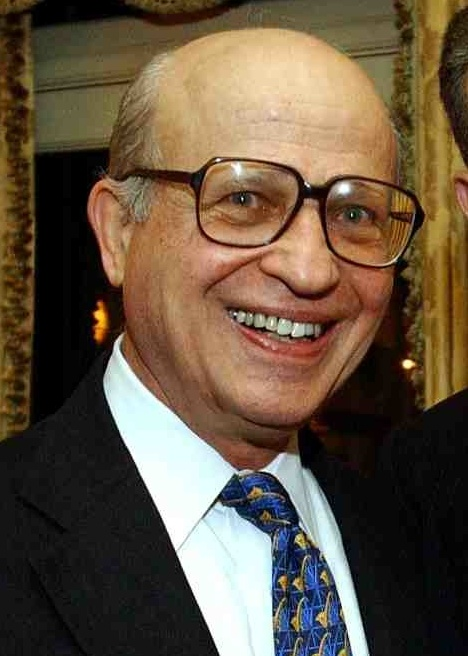

Assistant Secretary of the Treasury of Enforcement and Operations
- In office 1969–1973
- President: Richard Nixon

Personal details
- Born: October 23, 1927 Brooklyn, New York, U.S.
- Died: May 16, 2020 (aged 92) Washington, D.C., U.S.
- Relations: Gale Rossides (daughter); Eleni Rossides (daughter)
- Education: Columbia University (BA)

Gene Rossides (October 23, 1927 – May 16, 2020) was Assistant Secretary of the Treasury of Enforcement and Operations for the U.S. Department of the Treasury from 1969-1973 and was the founder of the American Hellenic Institute. Rossides was also an American football player who was drafted by the New York Giants in 1949. He was a lawyer by training and held political office in several administrations. For his success in various fields of government, sports, and journalism, the Greek Ministry of Foreign Affairs called him "one of the most emblematic figures of the Greek diaspora."

== Early life ==
He was born Eugene Telemachus Rossides in Brooklyn, New York on Oct. 23, 1927 to Greek and Cypriot parents. His father died when he was one month old, leaving his mother to support the family. He was a star football player at Erasmus Hall High School, as was his mentor Sid Luckman. Rossides was recruited to follow in Luckman's footsteps as a halfback at Columbia on a scholarship in 1944.

== Football career ==
Rossides presided over the Golden Era of Columbia Football from 1945 to 1948 when the program was known as a powerhouse. He entered Columbia College as halfback for Columbia's 1945 team as was nominated to the 1945 College Football All-America Team. He switched to playing quarterback as a junior after being tutored by Sid Luckman. He is most remembered for sealing Columbia's 21–20 victory over Army in October 1947 that snapped the Cadet's 32-game unbeaten streak. He still holds the school record for scoring during a single game with five touchdowns. He and teammate Leo Kusserow became widely known as the "Goal Dust Twins" and the Columbia quarterback team

In 1949, Rossides was drafted 95th overall by the New York Giants during the 10th round. However, he declined to join the team and took up a scholarship to attend Columbia Law School.

== Political career ==
After graduating from law school, he went into public practice. He first served as Assistant Attorney General of New York from 1956 to 1958, Assistant to the Undersecretary of Treasury in the Eisenhower Administration from 1958 to 1961, and as Assistant Secretary of Enforcement and Operations of the U.S. Treasury Department from 1969 to 1973, concurrently serving as the U.S. representative and vice president of Interpol.

As Assistant Secretary of the Treasury, Rossides was in charge of the Customs Service, the Secret Service, the US Mint, the Bureau of Engraving and Printing, the Tariff and Trade Office of Law Enforcement, the Federal Law Enforcement Training Center and the IRS law enforcement operations. He was also the first American of Greek descent to be confirmed by the US Senate to an Executive Branch office.

== Return to private practice ==
After leaving the administration, he worked at the law firm Rogers & Wells. He was the publisher of The National Herald, a Greek-American Newspaper, from 1976 to 1979.

In the wake of the Turkish invasion of Cyprus, Rossides founded the American Hellenic Institute in 1974 and his lobbying contributed to the US arms embargo against Turkey took effect on February 5, 1975, and remained in place until 1978.

== Personal life ==
Rossides died at his home in Washington on Saturday, May 16, 2020. He is survived by his wife, Aphrodite Rossides, his brother, Daniel Rossides, four children, and seven grandchildren.
