= Exclusive economic zone of Cyprus =

Map of the Exclusive Economic Zone of the Republic of Cyprus

The Exclusive Economic Zone of Cyprus covers 98,707 square km (38,100 square miles) in Eastern Mediterranean and is divided into 13 exploration squares.

== Agreements ==
January 2007 was the first time Cyprus and Lebanon talked about an agreement that will define an EEZ boundary, based on a median line between the two coasts. Cyprus agreed to the terms, but due to political tension, divisions, Lebanon's maritime dispute with Israel, and regional pressure over overlapping Eastern Mediterranean claims, it was stalled in parliament. During this time, Cyprus signed a separate EEZ agreement with Israel and Egypt, building its status in regional gas cooperation. The process of creating exclusive economic zones of Cyprus, Israel and Lebanon took place in Nicosia in 2010 with separate meetings between each country.

== Disputes ==
Cyprus and Turkey have been engaged in a dispute over the extent of their Exclusive Economic Zones, ostensibly sparked by oil and gas exploration in the area. Turkey objects to Cypriot drilling in waters that Cyprus has asserted a claim on. The present maritime zones dispute touches on the perennial Cyprus and Aegean disputes; Turkey is the only member state of the United Nations that does not recognise the Republic of Cyprus, and is one of the countries which are not signatory to the United Nations Convention on the Law of the Sea, which Cyprus has signed and ratified.

Turkey claims a portion of Cyprus' EEZ based on Turkey's definition that no islands, including Cyprus, can have a full 200 nautical mile EEZ authorized to coastal states, and should only be entitled to their 12 nautical mile territorial seas.

== Energy projects ==
Cyprus and Israel, as part of their broader cooperation, have agreed to start gas exploration with a joint US company, namely Noble Energy. The Cypriot and Israeli governments are discussing exporting their natural gas through the transport of compressed natural gas to Greece and then to the rest of Europe or through submarine pipelines starting from Israel and then leading to Greece via Cyprus.

== See also ==
- Geography of Cyprus
- Turkish invasion of Cyprus
- Exclusive economic zone of Greece
