= NATO Maritime Interdiction Operational Training Centre =

Training facility for NATO

NATO Maritime Interdiction Operational Training Centre (NMIOTC) is a training facility for NATO, at Crete Naval Base, in Souda Bay, Crete, Greece.

Located at the Northern Sector of the base (Marathi), it enables the NATO forces to better execute surface, sub-surface, aerial surveillance, and special operations activities that are necessary for the support of Maritime Interdiction Operations (MIO).

== History ==
NATO's Defence Ministers granted permission for NMIOTC's establishment on June 12, 2003, and the first personnel were assigned to its offices in November 2005.

== Training ==
NMIOTC's role is to offer training for NATO and NATO Partner nations in the following areas:

- Command Team MIO Issues
- Boarding Team Theoretical and Practical Issues
- Final training Tactical Exercise (FTX)
- Maritime Operational Terminology-MOTC
- Weapons of Mass Destruction (WMD) in MIO
- MIO in support of Counter Piracy
- C-IEDS Considerations in Maritime Force Protection
- Legal Issues in MIO
- MIO in support of International Efforts to Counter Human Trafficking Activities at Sea
- Autonomous Vessel Protection Detachment (VPD) Training
- C-IED Considerations in MIO
- MIO in Support of Migration Related Operations-Command Team and Practical Issues
- Maritime-Improvised Explosive Devise Disposal (M-IEDD)
- Maritime Aspects of Joint Operations
- Train the Trainers Technical Instructor Course
- Maritime Biometrics Collection and Tactical Forensic Site Exploitation
- Cyber Security Awareness in Maritime Environment

== Gallery ==
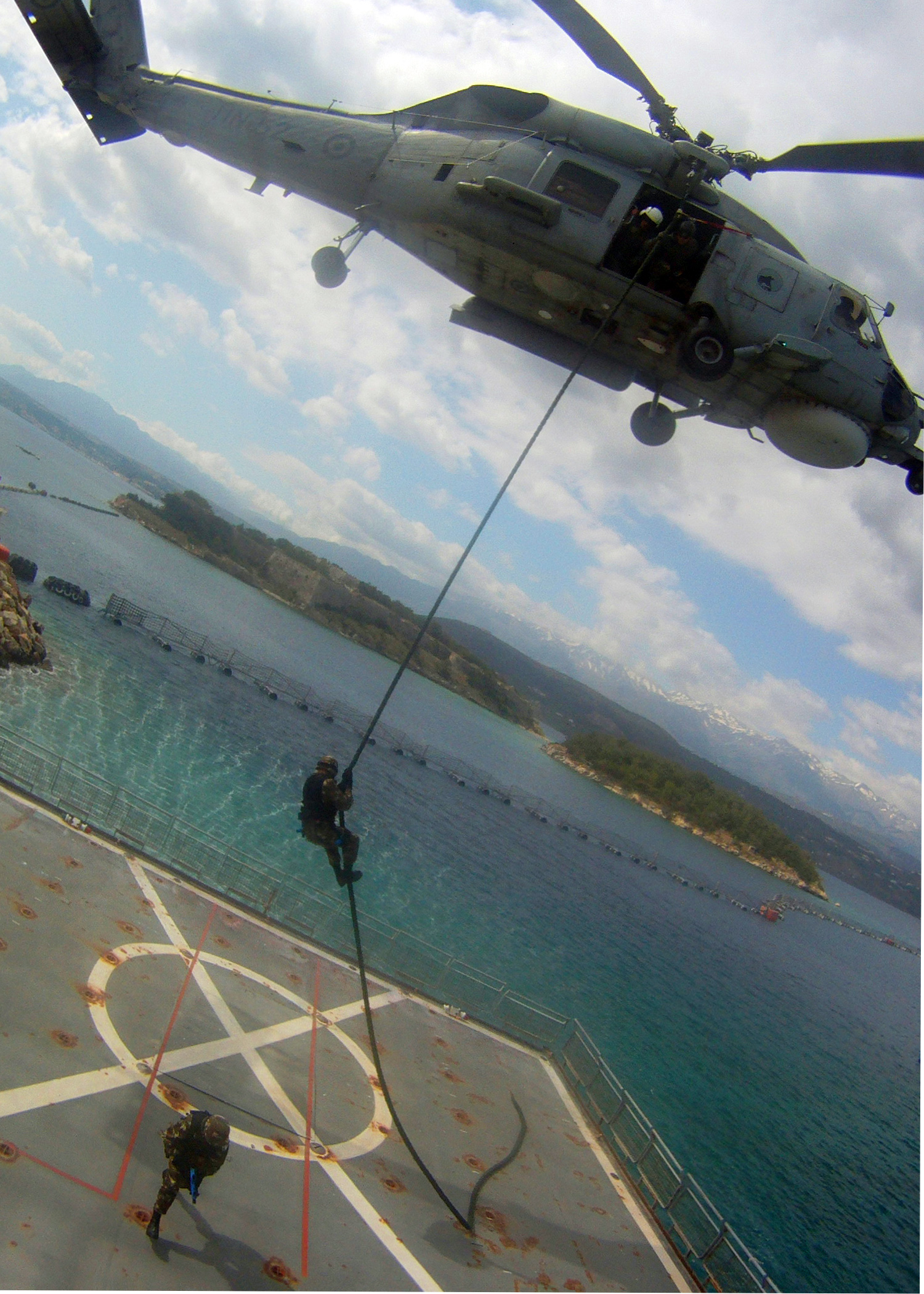
A member of an Algerian navy boarding team fast-ropes out of a Hellenic Navy S-70B-6 Aegean Hawk helicopter assigned to the 2nd Squadron onto the training ship Aris (A 74) at the NMIOTC

At NMIOTC, U.S. Navy Capt. Bradley D. Martin addresses a multinational audience during a pre-sail conference for exercise Phoenix Express 2012, a two-week exercise designed to strengthen maritime cooperation among partners from Africa, Europe and United States.

Members of a Moroccan navy participating in small-arms training aboard the training ship HS Aris (A 74), at the NMIOTC in Souda Bay, Greece.

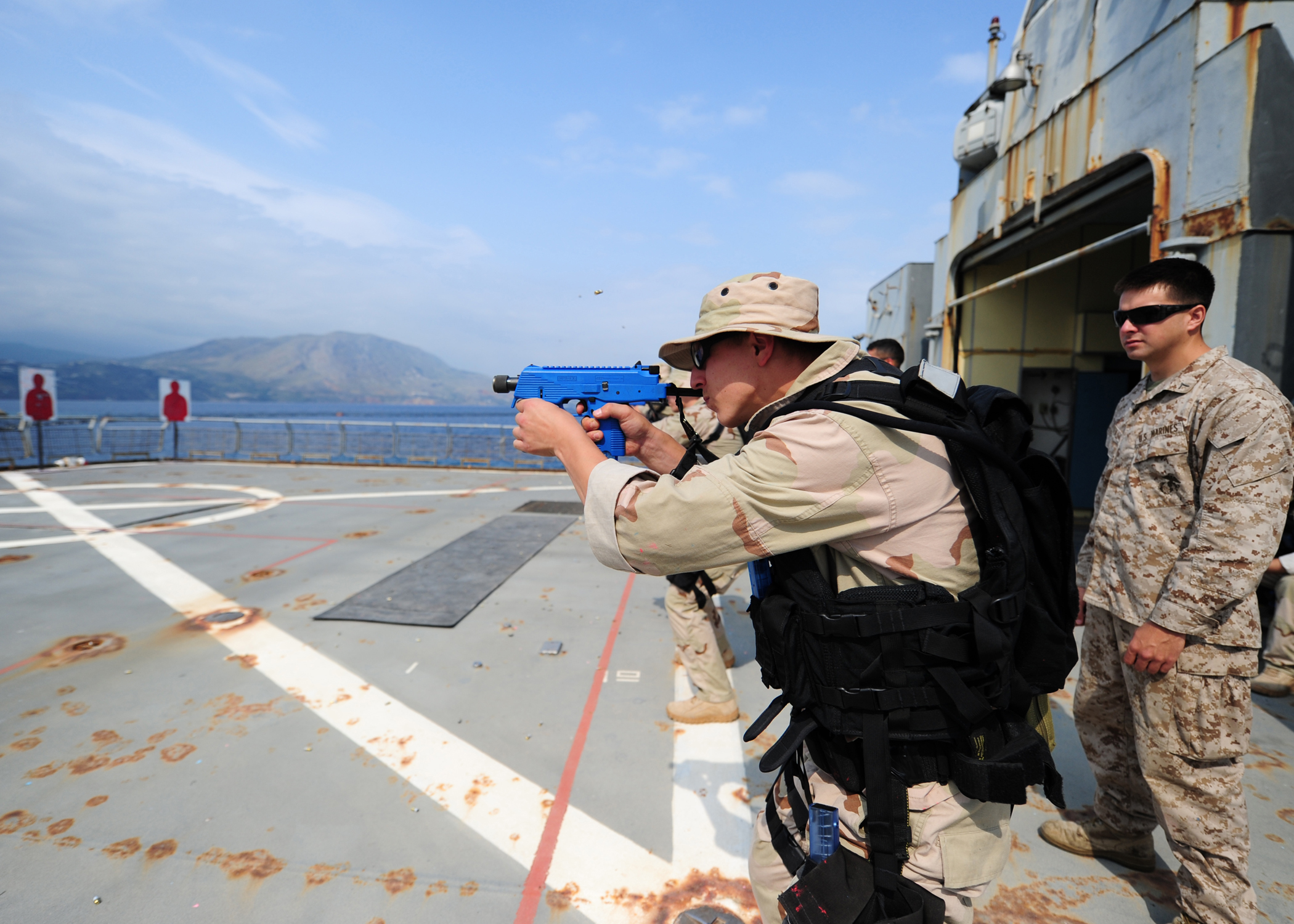
An Operations Specialist practices small-arms tactics, aboard the training ship Aris (A 74) at the NATO Maritime Interdiction Operational Training Center

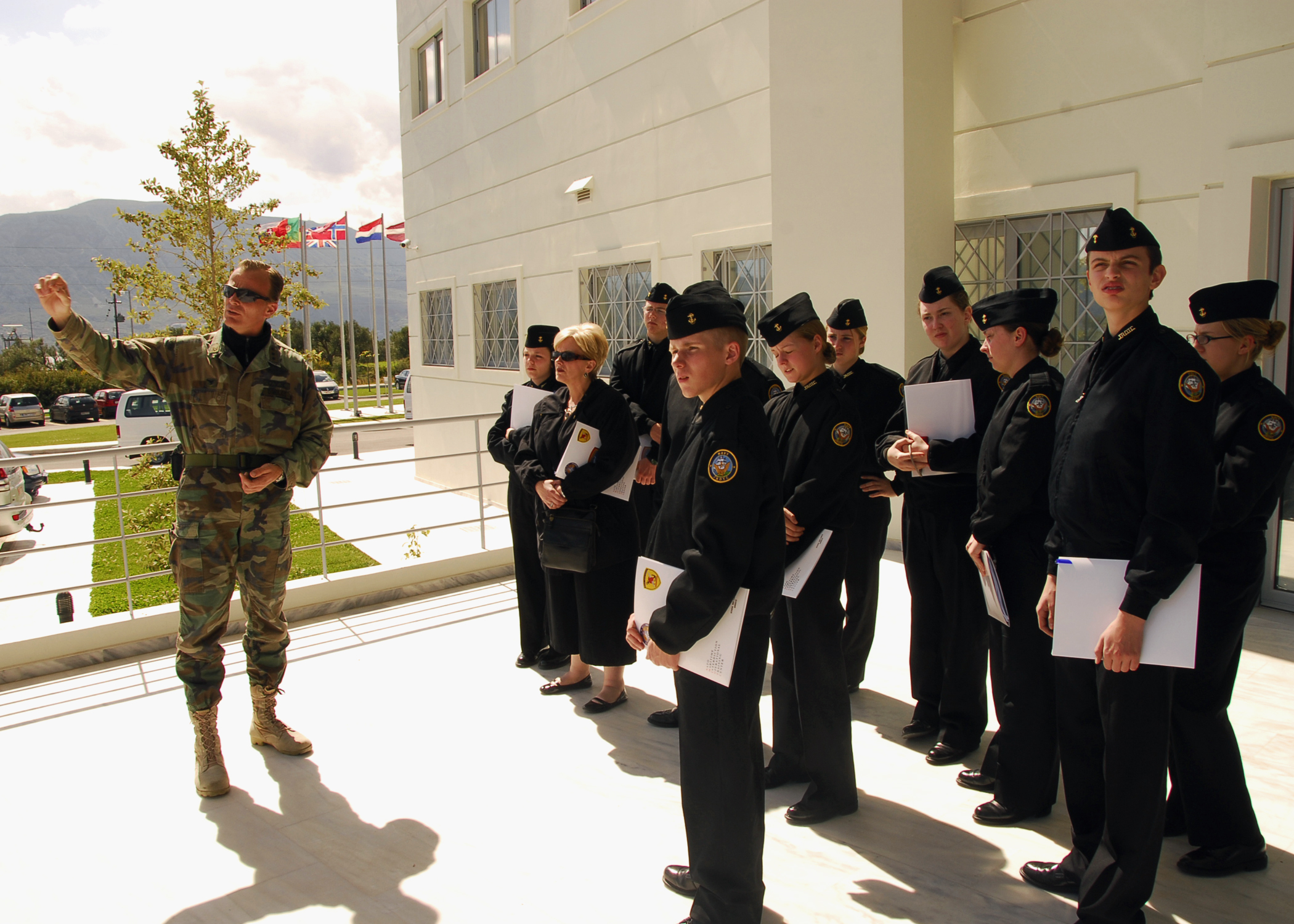
A Greek special forces representative from the NMIOTC speaks with students from the Willard High School, as part of an annual program that allows the students to get an up-close look at the various branches of the U.S. armed forces.

The Fleet Anti-terrorism Security Team demonstrates fast rope techniques for Moroccan sailors at the NMIOTC in Souda Bay, Greece, during exercise Phoenix Express.
