= Eagle Partner 2023 =

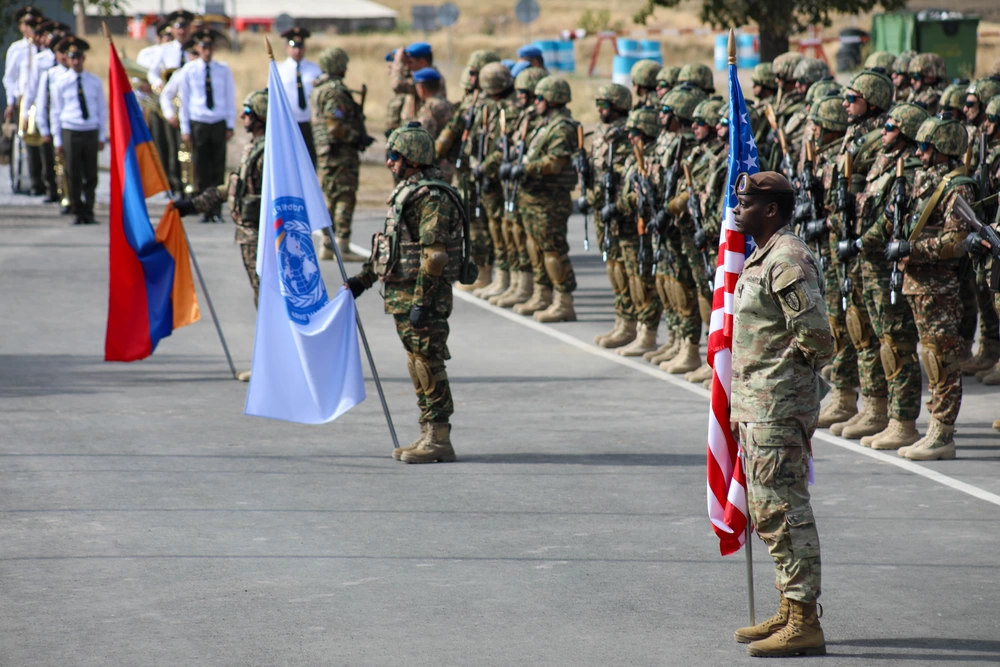
Soldiers hold an Opening Ceremony

Eagle Partner 2023 was a military exercise that happened in Armenia from 11 September to 20 September 2023. The main goal of the exercise was the fortifying of the alliance between the United States with Armenia and also the training of the 12th Peacekeeping Brigade of the Armed Forces of Armenia for future peacekeeping missions. It involved approximately 85 U.S. soldiers and approximately 175 Armenian soldiers. The exercise happened at the Zar Training Area of the Peacekeeping Brigade and the N Training Center of the Ministry of Defense. Major general Gregory Anderson, Brigadier general Patrick Ellis, and US Ambassador to Armenia Kristina Kvien were the observers of the exercise. The Director of the exercise was Armenian Colonel Arsen Mangasaryan and the deputy director was U.S. Lieutenant Colonel Kevin Kennedy. The Operations Coordinator of the exercise was Scott Safer. The Soldiers who executed the training came from the world famous 101st ABN DIV. COL Travis Voekel, 1st IBCT Commander, entrusted Soldiers of Charlie Company, 1-327IN Battalion led by CPT Moreno, F. the Company Commander selected by LTC Loar J. the 1-327IN Battalion Commander. with this critical relationship exercise.

== Timeline of the exercise ==
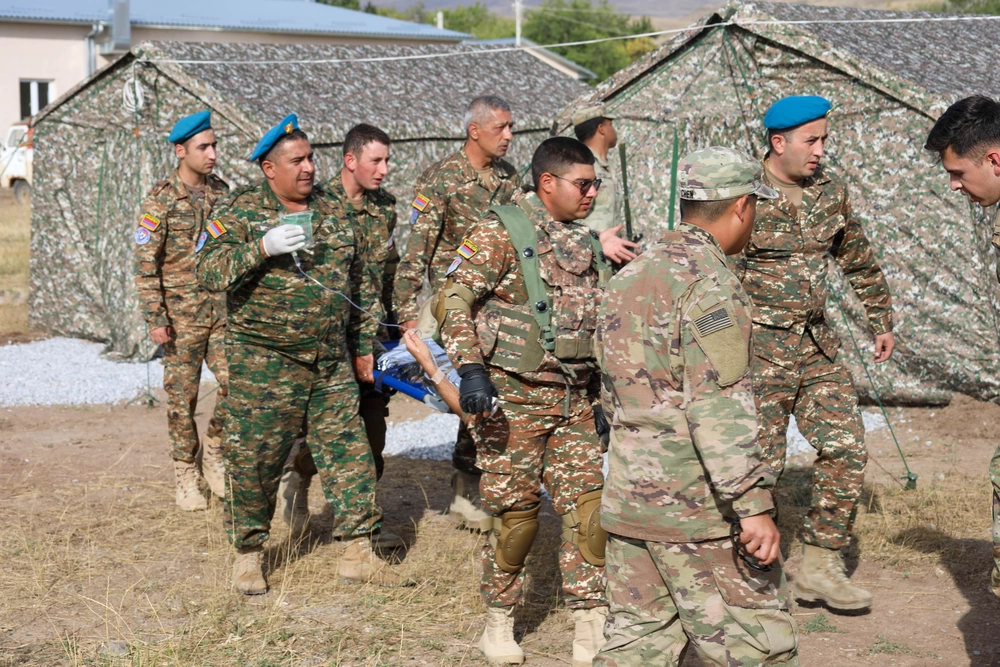
Soldiers conducting a Casualty Evacuation Simulation

=== September 10 ===
Casualty Evacuation (CASEVAC) simulation was conducted on the first day of the exercise for medical personal to verify processes and procedures in a safe environment.

=== September 11 ===
Soldiers of the 12th Peacekeeping Brigade and soldiers from the Kansas National Guard and 1st Brigade Combat Team, 101st Airborne Division, Task Force Mountain held an opening day ceremony for Eagle Partner 2023 on 11 September in a training area in Armenia. The opening ceremony was attended by the Chief of the General Staff of the Armed Forces of Armenia and First Deputy Minister of Defense Lieutenant General Edward Asryan.

Also, an esprit de corps ruck march was done by the soldiers.

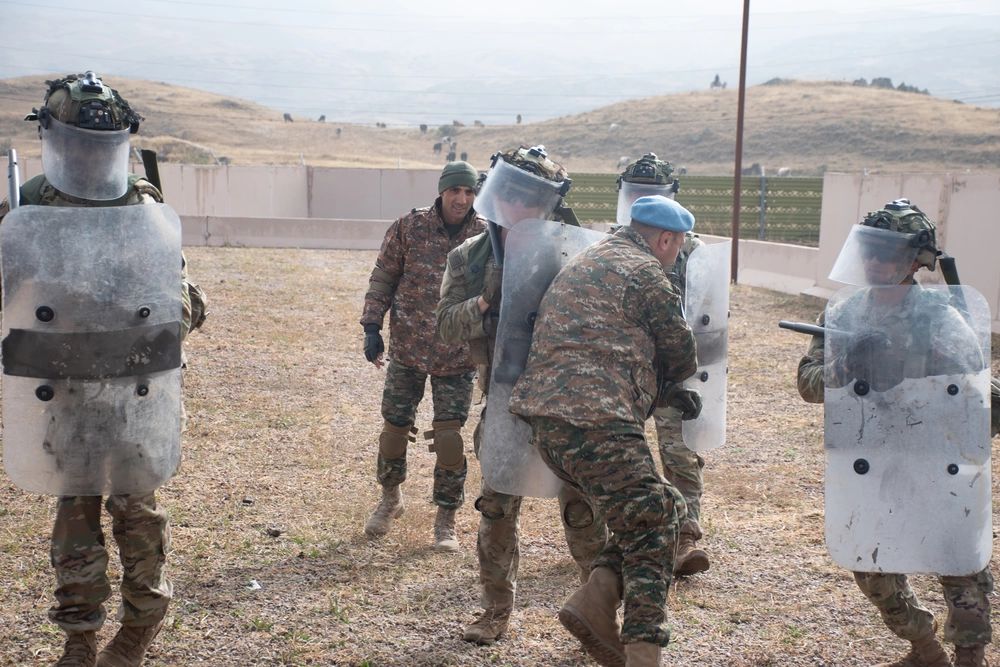
Soldiers conducting a Riot Training

=== September 13 ===
On this day, the units conducted a classroom training and they engaged in a riot training.

=== September 14 ===
A Situational Training Exercise was conducted, during which soldiers trained to diffuse explosives, provide security watches, conduct casualty evacuation care, provide suppression fire and much more.

=== September 15 ===
A distinguished visitor day was held on this day. The U.S. Ambassador to Armenia Kristina Kvien, Armenian Minister of Defense Suren Papikyan, Major general Gregory Anderson, Brigadier general Patrick Ellis and others visited the training area where the exercise took place.

On the same day, a Range Training was held.

A Joint Peacekeeping Exercise was conducted, during which, a riot was simulated in order to show the knowledge and skills of the soldiers.

=== September 16 ===
An Armenian Genocide Memorial Day was held on 16 September. Soldiers visited the Armenian Genocide Memorial complex.

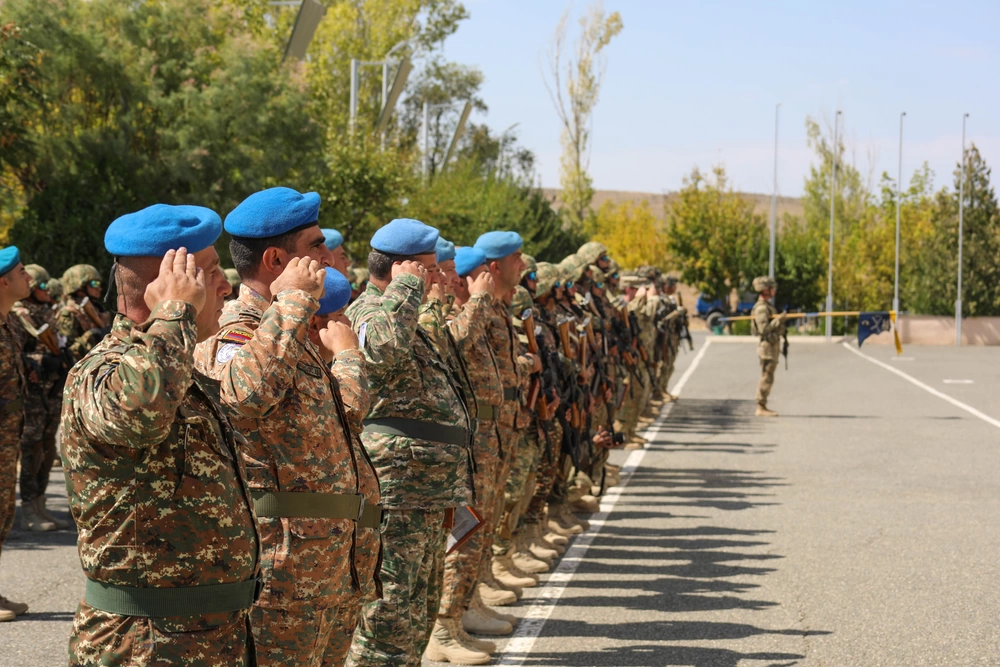
Soldiers hold a Closing Ceremony

=== September 19 ===
On 19 September, the soldiers conducted a Squad Live Fire Exercise, during which explosive ordinance disposal classes, psychological warfare exercises and other exercises were held.

=== September 20 ===
On the last day of the exercises, a closing ceremony was held. The Operations Coordinator Scott Safer received an award from the Armenian forces.

== Subsequent Eagle Partner's ==
=== Eagle Partner 2024 ===
Colonel Arsen Mangasaryan, commander of the 12th Peacekeeping Brigade and the exercise director for Eagle Partner 2023, said that another joint military exercise would happen in 2024.

Eagle Partner 2024 began on 15 July and concluded on 24 July. The opening ceremony was attended by U.S. Ambassador to Armenia Kristina Kvien. Kvien stated, "As I look out on this parade ground and the large number of U.S. and Armenian soldiers standing shoulder to shoulder in formation, it is very clear just how much our bilateral cooperation has grown."

=== Eagle Partner 2025 ===
Eagle Partner 2025 took place from 12 to 20 August. The exercise focused on the preparation and execution of international peacekeeping operations with an emphasis on medical evacuation procedures, tactical communication, and strengthening the readiness of Armenia's peacekeeping units.

== See also ==
- Armenia–NATO relations
- Armenia–United States relations
- Armenia–United States Strategic Partnership Charter
- Kansas–Armenia National Guard Partnership
