= Kansas–Armenia National Guard Partnership =

Kansas-Armenia State Partnership
- Part of the U.S. European Command State Partnership Program
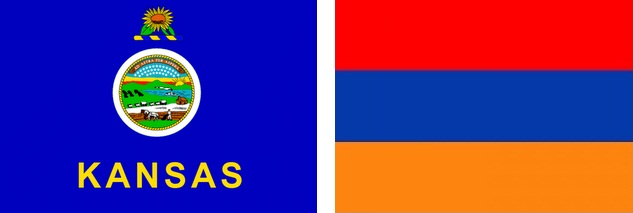
- Origin: 2003
- Country president: Vahagn Khachaturyan
- Prime minister: Nikol Pashinyan
- Minister of defense: Suren Papikyan
- Ambassador to U.S.: Varuzhan Nersesyan
- Ambassador to Armenia: Kristina Kvien
- State Governor: Laura Kelly
- Adjutant general: David Weishaar
- 2012 Engagements: 10
- NATO member: No
- EU member: No

Location of Armenia

The Kansas–Armenia National Guard Partnership is one of 25 European partnerships that make-up the U.S. European Command State Partnership Program and one of 88 worldwide partnerships that make-up the National Guard State Partnership Program. The Republic of Armenia signed a bilateral affairs agreement with the U.S. Department of Defense and the state of Kansas in 2003 establishing the Kansas-Armenia State Partnership Program. Former Kansas Governor Kathleen Sebelius subsequently signed a proclamation declaring June 18, 2004, as Kansas-Armenia Partnership Day.

The partnership aims to develop self-sustaining relationships between the Armenian Ministry of Defense and the Kansas National Guard as well as various civilian organizations in order to exchange knowledge in areas such as emergency management and disaster response, border and port security, economic security, peacekeeping operations and counter terrorism.

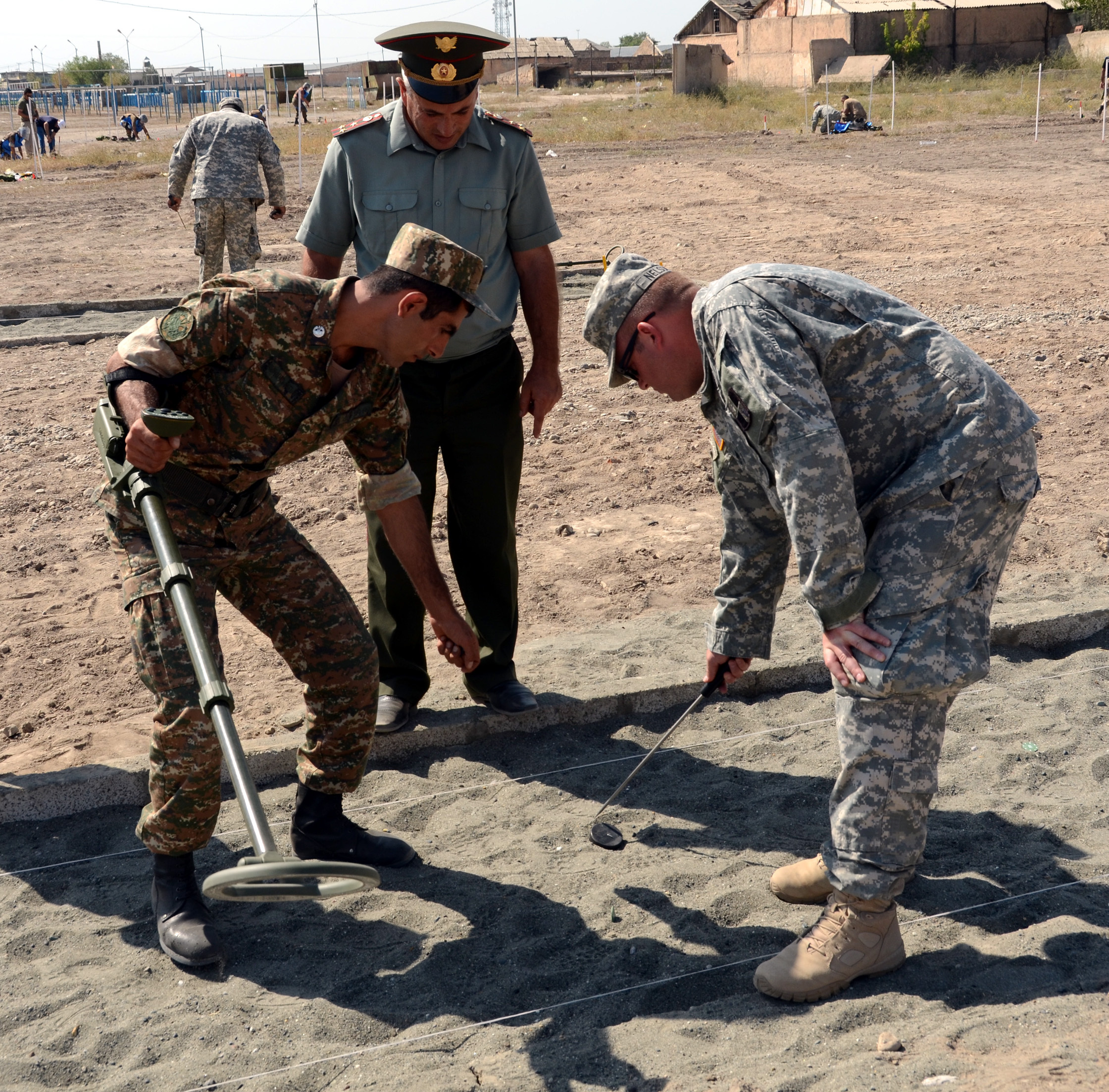
Kansas-Armenia demining exercise

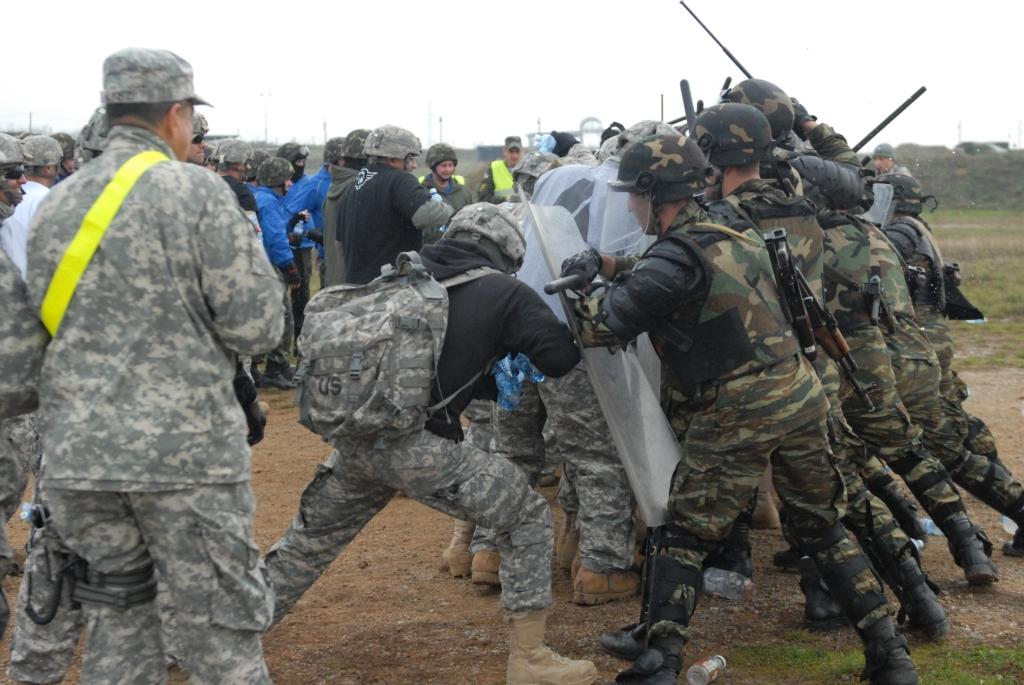
Riot control exercise

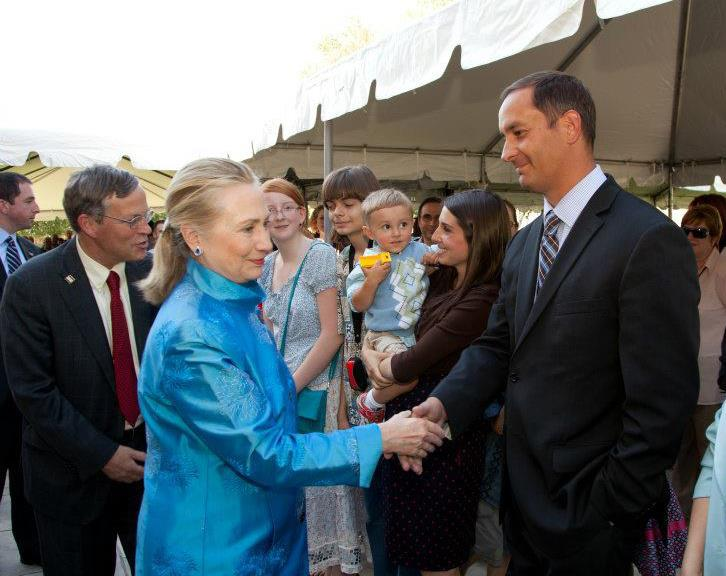
Secretary Hillary Clinton visits Armenia

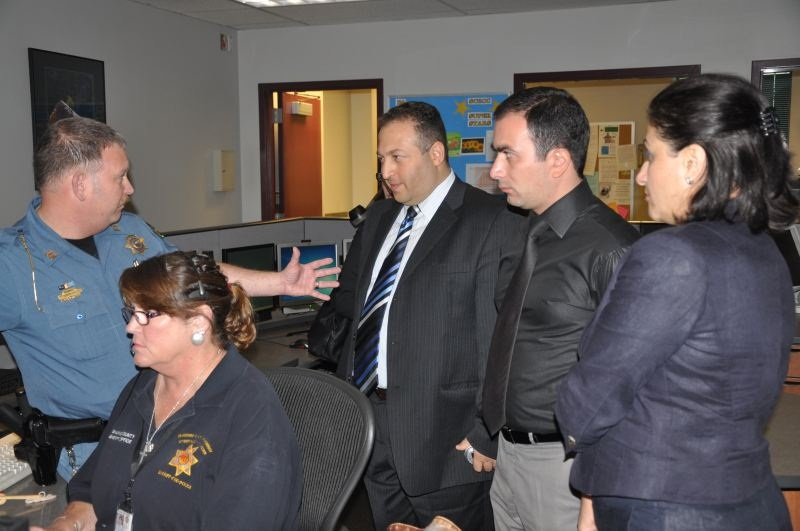
Armenian officials visit Kansas 911 center

== History ==
Armenia declared its independence from the Soviet Union on August 23, 1990, having previously been the Armenian Soviet Socialist Republic, one of the constituent republics of the USSR since 1936, and part of the Transcaucasian Soviet Federated Socialist Republic since 1920. In the wake of the August Coup (1991), a referendum was held on the question of secession. Following an overwhelming vote in favor, full independence was declared on September 21, 1991. However, widespread recognition did not occur until the formal dissolution of the Soviet Union on December 25, 1991. The dissolution of the Soviet Union brought an end to the Cold War and created the opportunity for bilateral relations with the New Independent States (NIS) as they began a political and economic transformation. The U.S. recognized the independence of Armenia on December 25, 1991, and opened an embassy in Yerevan in February 1992.

The Kansas-Armenia State Partnership was established in June 2003 for the purpose of fostering security cooperation between the United States and Armenia and to support the objectives of the Supreme Headquarters Allied Powers Europe. Each year, Kansas and Armenia conducts numerous joint exercises in both locations that span across educational, law enforcement, medical, military, and emergency preparedness endeavors. Within the framework of the Ambassador's Mission Strategic Resource Plan (MSRP) and EUCOM's Theater Security Strategy, the Kansas-Armenia Partnership strengthens bilateral security relationships, enhances partner capacity and promotes effective civil-military relations.

Twice a year, in January and July, the State Partnership Program hosts the International Officers visit from Command and General Staff College, Fort Leavenworth, Kan. This is a state government visit to Topeka to familiarize international officers with the judicial, legislative and executive branches of state government; including the role of the National Guard. Other military cooperation events focus on enhancing U.S. military standards and procedures, as well as enhancing interoperability between Euro-Atlantic and Armenian forces. Annually, the program continues efforts to expand beyond the military-to-military relationships. Civil engagement initiatives started in 2008 in the areas of higher education and police/law enforcement and have begun to show tangible results. Expanding on the efforts started in education, Kansas partnered with the Bureau of International Narcotics and Law Enforcement within the U.S. Embassy in Armenia to begin conducting law enforcement related events similar to the military events the Kansas National Guard has been conducting.

In 2025, the Kansas National Guard joined the Armenian Army for Eagle Partner 2025, a bilateral training event taking place across Armenia. The 2-week exercises focused on peacekeeping missions, medical evacuation, and tactical communication. Eagle Partner exercises have also been conducted in 2023 and 2024, and are to take place annually.

== Partnership focus ==
The following are EUCOM stated areas of focus for the Kansas-Armenia partnership:

- Foster regional stability
- Assist with strategic defense reform
- Increase NATO interoperability
- Strengthen multilateral military cooperation
- Increase Armenian coalition contributions
- Enhance expeditionary medical capabilities
- Enhance Peace Keeping Brigade capabilities
- Improve demining capabilities

== Funding ==
The U.S. has made a concerted effort to help Armenia during its difficult transition from totalitarianism and a command economy to democracy and open markets. The monetary value of assistance provided by Office of Defense Cooperation (ODC) and State Department defense related programs is mandated by Congress and fluctuates slightly each year. Over the last 4 years, International Military Education and Training (IMET) for Armenia has amounted to approximately 3.2 million US Dollars. This has provided military education and language training for over 100 Officers, NCOs and junior enlisted soldiers. Foreign Military Financing (FMF) for Armenia has amounted to approximately 17.5 million US dollars. FMF has been used to promote professional military education, deployable medicine and enhancing the Armenian Peace Keeping Brigade. Humanitarian Assistance (HA) for Armenia has amounted to nearly one million US Dollars provided to schools, hospitals and orphanages throughout Armenia.

== International organizations and agreements ==
Armenia is a member of the UN, Council of Europe, European Neighbourhood Policy of the EU, Organization for Security and Cooperation in Europe (OSCE), Commonwealth of Independent States (CIS), NATO's Partnership for Peace, Collective Security Treaty Organization (CSTO), Euro-Atlantic Partnership Council, and World Trade Organization.

U.S. assistance supports Armenia's transition into a stable partner at peace with its neighbors. The United States provides multifaceted assistance to Armenia through a variety of programs designed to promote economic growth, encourage democratic governance, improve health and social protection systems, and enhance Armenia's peace and security as well as providing humanitarian assistance to the poor, elderly, and other vulnerable groups through a "whole of government" approach that involves a number of U.S. government agencies.

The Conventional Armed Forces in Europe (CFE) Treaty, limiting military equipment, was ratified by the Armenian parliament in July 1992. In March 1993, Armenia signed the multilateral Chemical Weapons Convention, for the eventual elimination of chemical weapons. Armenia became a non-nuclear state under the Non-Proliferation Treaty in July 1993. In July 2008, the U.S. and Armenia signed an action plan to partner on Combating Smuggling of Nuclear and Radiological Materials under the U.S. Department of State's Nuclear Smuggling Outreach Initiative (NSOI). In the same framework, Armenia is participating in the U.S.-led Preventing Nuclear Smuggling Program (PNSP). Armenia also participates in the Global Initiative to Counter Nuclear Terrorism (GICNT).

In September 2010, Armenia and the United States signed an agreement to implement a Biological Threat Reduction Program, which will enhance U.S.-Armenia cooperation in preventing the proliferation of technology, pathogens, and expertise that could be used in the development of biological weapons. Armenia provides troops for peacekeeping operations elsewhere and has an Acquisition and Cross-Servicing Agreement and an Agreement on Cooperation of Defense and Economy with the U.S., and a Status of Forces agreement is in place.

== See also ==
- Armed Forces of Armenia
- Armenia–NATO relations
- Armenia–United States relations
- Armenia–United States Strategic Partnership Charter
- Eagle Partner 2023
