= Congressional Armenian Caucus =

Organization in the U.S. Congress

- Co-Chairs: Gus Bilirakis (R); Frank Pallone (D); Jackie Speier (D); David Valadao (R)
- Vice-Chairs: Adam Schiff (D)
- Founded: 1995
- Political position: Big tent

The Congressional Armenian Caucus (CAC) is an organization of over 100 members of the United States Congress. The caucus is dedicated to keeping members of Congress engaged on Armenia-related issues as well as strengthening and maintaining the United States-Armenia relationship. In particular, the CAC aims to increase U.S. aid to Armenia and Artsakh, recognize the Armenian genocide and to recognize the independence of Artsakh. The CAC was founded in 1995. Although the majority of the members are from the Democratic Party, there are also members from the Republican Party, including co-chairs Gus Bilirakis and David Valadao.

== Co-chairs ==
- Gus Bilirakis
- Frank Pallone
- Brad Sherman
- David Valadao

== Vice-chairs ==
- Adam Schiff

== Notable activities ==
During the 2020 Nagorno-Karabakh War, members of the CAC urged the United States to recognize the independence of Artsakh and to support its right to self-determination. On October 22, 2020 Frank Pallone, joined by a bipartisan group of 34 members of the House of Representatives, introduced a resolution supporting the Republic of Artsakh, recognizing its right to self-determination, and condemning Azerbaijan and Turkey for aggression.

On November 13, 2020, the CAC called on then-President-Elect Joe Biden to lead U.S. re-engagement in negotiations for a lasting settlement of the Nagorno-Karabakh conflict through the OSCE Minsk Group and to stop military aid to Azerbaijan.

On November 18, 2020, the CAC's co-chairs urged the U.S. administration to re-engage in the OSCE-led Artsakh Peace Process.

On February 19, 2021, 100 U.S. representatives called on the Biden administration to stand with Artsakh and Armenia in a bipartisan CAC letter.

On March 5, 2021, a resolution submitted by the CAC called on Azerbaijan to immediately release all 200+ Armenian prisoners of war and captured civilians. This resolution was introduced by Adam Schiff, Gus Bilirakis, Jackie Speier, David Valadao and Frank Pallone. Additionally, it cites findings that Azerbaijani military forces have mistreated ethnic Armenian prisoners of war and subjected them to "physical abuse and humiliation," including beheadings, summary executions, and the desecration of human remains.

On March 31, 2021, the CAC started collecting signatures on a letter calling for a robust Artsakh humanitarian assistance package for refugees, housing, food security, water and sanitation, healthcare, rehabilitation, and the removal of landmines.

On 1 April 2021, the CAC called for over $100 million in U.S. aid to Armenia and Artsakh following Turkey and Azerbaijan’s devastating attacks the previous year, as House Appropriations Subcommittee on Foreign Operations Chairwoman Barbara Lee (D-CA) and Ranking Member Hal Rogers (R-KY) began crafting the FY2022 Foreign Aid Bill.

== Notable members ==
- Rosa DeLauro (Chair of the House Appropriations Committee)
- Adam Smith (Chair of the House Committee on Armed Services)
- Frank Pallone (Chair of the House Energy and Commerce Committee)
- Ted Deutch (Chair of the House Ethics Committee)
- Gregory Meeks (Chair of the House Foreign Affairs Committee)
- Zoe Lofgren (Chair of the House Administration Committee)
- Adam Schiff (Chair of the House Intelligence Committee)
- Raul Grijalva (Chair of the House Natural Resources Committee)
- Carolyn Maloney (Chair of the House Oversight and Reform Committee)
- Jim McGovern (Chair of the House Rules Committee)
- Eddie Bernice Johnson (Chair of the House Committee on Science, Space and Technology)
- Nydia Velázquez (Chair of the House Small Business Committee)
- Mark Takano (Chair of the House Transportation and Infrastructure Committee)
- Richard Neal (Chair of the House Ways and Means Committee)

== List of members ==
Congressional Armenian Caucus in the 118th United States Congress

The following is the list of CAC members as of April 2025 according to the Armenian National Committee of America:

Arizona
- David Schweikert (AZ-1)
- Paul Gosar (AZ-9)

California

- Brad Sherman (CA-32)
- Darrell Issa (CA-48)
- Dave Min (CA-47)
- David Valadao (CA-22)
- Doris Matsui (CA-07)
- Eric Swalwell (CA-14)
- Jared Huffman (CA-02)
- Jay Obernolte (CA-23)
- Jim Costa (CA-16)
- Jimmy Gomez (CA-34)
- Josh Harder (CA-09)
- Juan Vargas (CA-52)
- Judy Chu (CA-28)
- Julia Brownley (CA-26)
- Ken Calvert (CA-41)
- Kevin Mullin (CA-15)
- Laura Friedman (CA-30)
- Linda Sanchez (CA-38)
- Lou Correa (CA-46)
- Luz Rivas (CA-29)
- Mark Takano (CA-39)
- Mike Levin (CA-49)
- Mike Thompson (CA-04)
- Nancy Pelosi (CA-11)
- Nanette Diaz Barragan (CA-44)
- Ro Khanna (CA-17)
- Robert Garcia (CA-42)
- Salud Carbajal (CA-24)
- Scott Peters (CA-50)
- Sydney Kamlager-Dove (CA-37)
- Ted Lieu (CA-36)
- Tom McClintock (CA-05)
- Vince Fong (CA-20)
- Young Kim (CA-40)
- Zoe Lofgren (CA-18)

Colorado

- Joe Neguse (CO-02)
- Jason Crow (CO-06)

Connecticut

- Jim Himes (CT-04)
- Rosa DeLauro (CT-03)
- John Larson (CT-01)

Florida

- Gus Bilirakis (FL-12)

Illinois

- Brad Schneider (IL-10)
- Danny Davis (IL-07)
- Janice Schakowsky (IL-09)
- Mike Quigley (IL-05)
- Nikki Budzinski (IL-13)
- Raja Krishnamoorthi (IL-08)

Maine

- Chellie Pingree (ME-01)

Maryland

- Jamie Raskin (MD-08)

Massachusetts

- Ayanna Pressley (MA-07)
- Jim McGovern (MA-02)
- Katherine Clark (MA-05)
- Lori Trahan (MA-03)
- Richard Neal (MA-01)
- Seth Moulton (MA-06)
- Stephen Lynch (MA-08)

Michigan

- Debbie Dingell (MI-06)
- Haley Stevens (MI-11)
- John Moolenaar (MI-02)
- Rashida Tlaib (MI-12)

Minnesota

- Betty McCollum (MN-04)
- Ilhan Omar (MN-05)

Nevada

- Dina Titus (NV-01)
- Susie Lee (NV-03)

New Hampshire

- Chris Pappas (NH-01)

New Jersey

- Donald Norcross (NJ-01)
- Josh Gottheimer (NJ-05)
- Rob Menendez (NJ-08)

New York

- Grace Meng (NY-06)
- Gregory Meeks (NY-05)
- George Latimer (NY-16)
- Joseph Morelle (NY-25)
- Mike Lawler (NY-17)
- Nicole Malliotakis (NY-11)
- Nydia Velázquez (NY-07)
- Paul Tonko (NY-20)
- Tom Suozzi (NY-03)

Ohio

- David Joyce (OH-14)
- Marcy Kaptur (OH-09)

Oklahoma

- Kevin Hern (OK-01)

Pennsylvania

- Brendan Boyle (PA-02)
- Madeleine Dean (PA-04)
- Mary Gay Scanlon (PA-05)

Rhode Island

- Gabe Amo (RI-01)
- Seth Magaziner (RI-02)

South Carolina

- Joe Wilson (SC-02)

Texas

- Joaquín Castro (TX-20)
- Lloyd Doggett (TX-35)
- Michael McCaul (TX-10)
- Pat Fallon (TX-04)

Virginia

- Don Beyer (VA-08)

Washington

- Adam Smith (WA-09)

Wisconsin

- Bryan Steil (WI-01)

== See also ==
- Armenian Americans
- Artsakh–United States relations
- Armenia–United States Strategic Partnership Charter
