= Military Police (Armenia) =

- Active: 5 May 1992–present
- Country: Armenia
- Branch: Armed Forces of Armenia
- Role: Disciplinary duties
- Part of: Ministry of Defense of Armenia
- Garrison/HQ: Yerevan
- Anniversaries: Military Police Day (5 May)

Commanders
- Commander: Ashot Zakaryan

The Military Police of Armenia (Armenian: Ռազմական ոստիկանություն, romanized: Rrazmakan vostikanut’yun) is the military police branch of the Armed Forces of Armenia under the command of the Ministry of Defence. In the MoD, it is separate from the central apparatus. It is governed by the RA Law on Military Police.

== Purpose ==
The Military Police is responsible for the following:

- Investigation of military crimes in the armed forces on the territory of military unit.
- Deterrence and prevention of crimes committed by military servicemen.
- Protection of property that belongs to the military.

== History ==
The Military Police was established on 5 May 1992, by order of Minister of Defense Vazgen Sargsyan. It had no special status until 2007. That year, a law to define the status of a Military Police was adopted by the National Assembly. Military Police bylaws were approved by the Government on 25 December 2008.

== Organization ==
- Yerevan Department of the Military Police
- Vanadzor Department of the Military Police
- Sisian Department of the Military Police

== Activities ==
In 2018, the Armenian Defense Ministry announced that ahead of the 2018 army draft, the military police would be posted at Zvartnots International Airport to help arriving draftees from the diaspora in being able to fulfill their army service. Similar postings were also conducted at Shirak Airport.

=== Peacekeeping ===
The military police is in control of the 12th Peacekeeping Brigade, which also known as the Blue Berets due to its similarities to the Armenian Airborne Forces. It specializes in peacekeeping in foreign countries as part of international initiatives. It has collaborated in several international missions with the West, including missions in Kosovo, Afghanistan, Iraq and Syria. In 2019, a Military Police peacekeeping platoon participated in a NATO-sponsored training held in Armenia.

== Chief of the Military Police ==
- Major General Artur Baghdasarian (May 2017 - 19 February 2020)
- Colonel Alexander Aghajanyan (acting) (19 February 2020 - 6 August 2020)
- Ashot Zakaryan (6 August 2020 - present)

== See also ==
- Military Police (Azerbaijan)
- Military Police (Russia)
- Military Police (Kazakhstan)
