= Armenia–United States relations =

- Armenia: United States

Diplomatic mission
- Embassy of Armenia, Washington, D.C.: Embassy of the United States, Yerevan

Envoy
- Armenian Ambassador to the United States Lilit Makunts: American Ambassador to Armenia David Allen

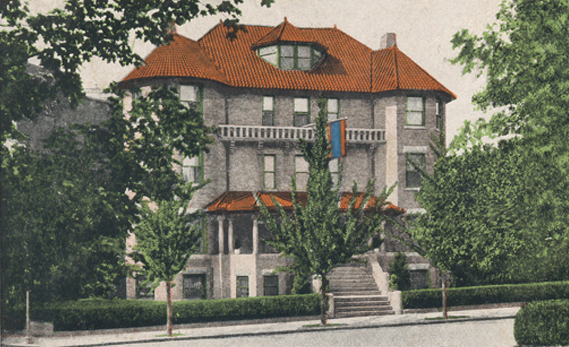
Embassy of Armenia in Washington D.C. in 1918

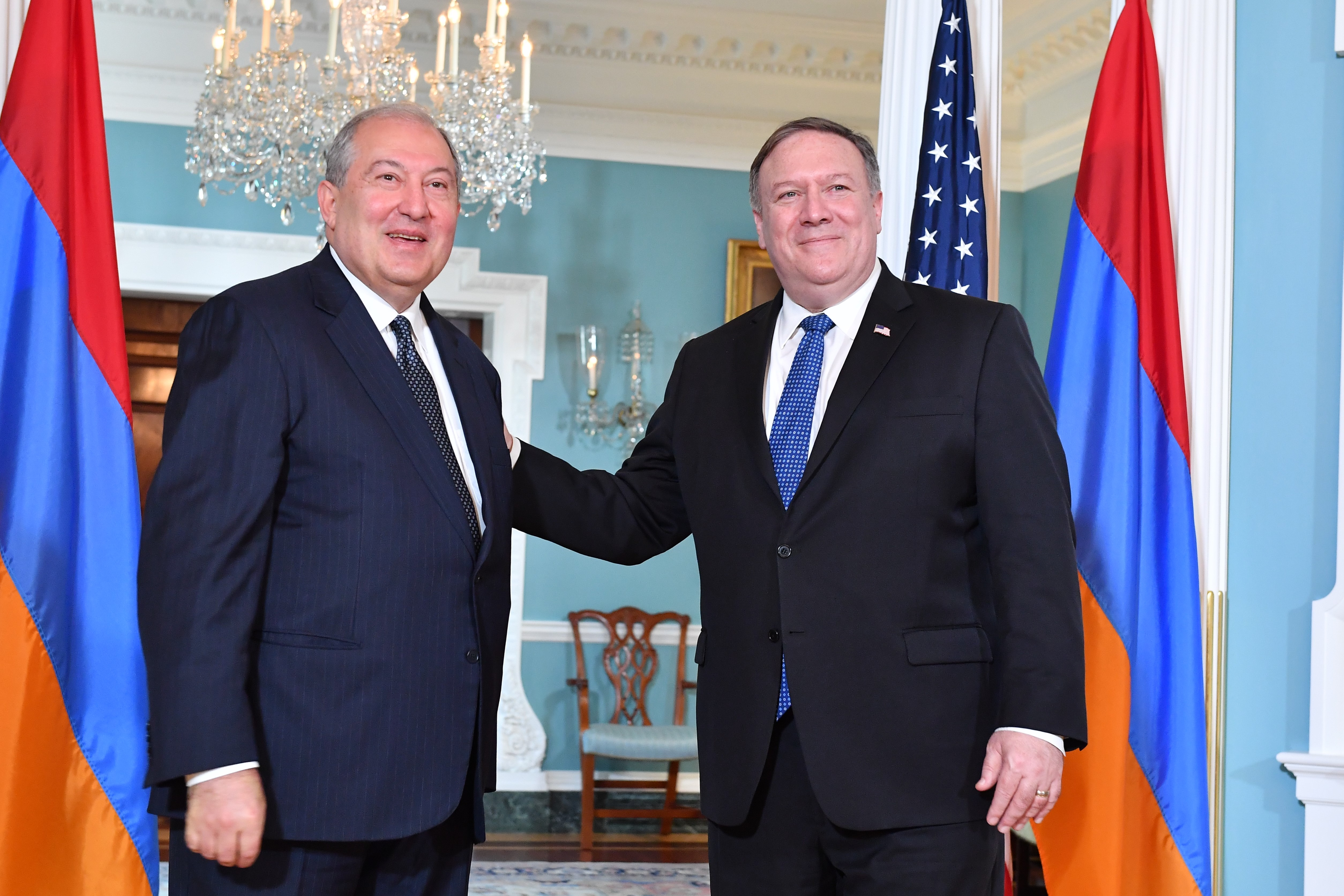
U.S. Secretary of State Mike Pompeo meets with Armenian President Armen Sarkissian in Washington, D.C. in June 2018

The dissolution of the Soviet Union in December 1991 brought an end to the Cold War and created an opportunity for establishing bilateral relations between the United States with Armenia and other post-Soviet states as they began a political and economic transformation. The United States recognized the independence of Armenia on 25 December 1991, and established an embassy in Armenia's capital Yerevan in February 1992. Diplomatic relations between the two nations started on 7 January 1992.

The United States has made a concerted effort to help Armenia and other NIS during their transition from authoritarianism and a planned economy to democracy and a market economy. The Freedom for Russia and Emerging Eurasian Democracies and Open Markets (FREEDOM) Support Act was enacted in October 1992. Under this and other programs, the United States to date has provided humanitarian and technical assistance for Armenia.

== History ==
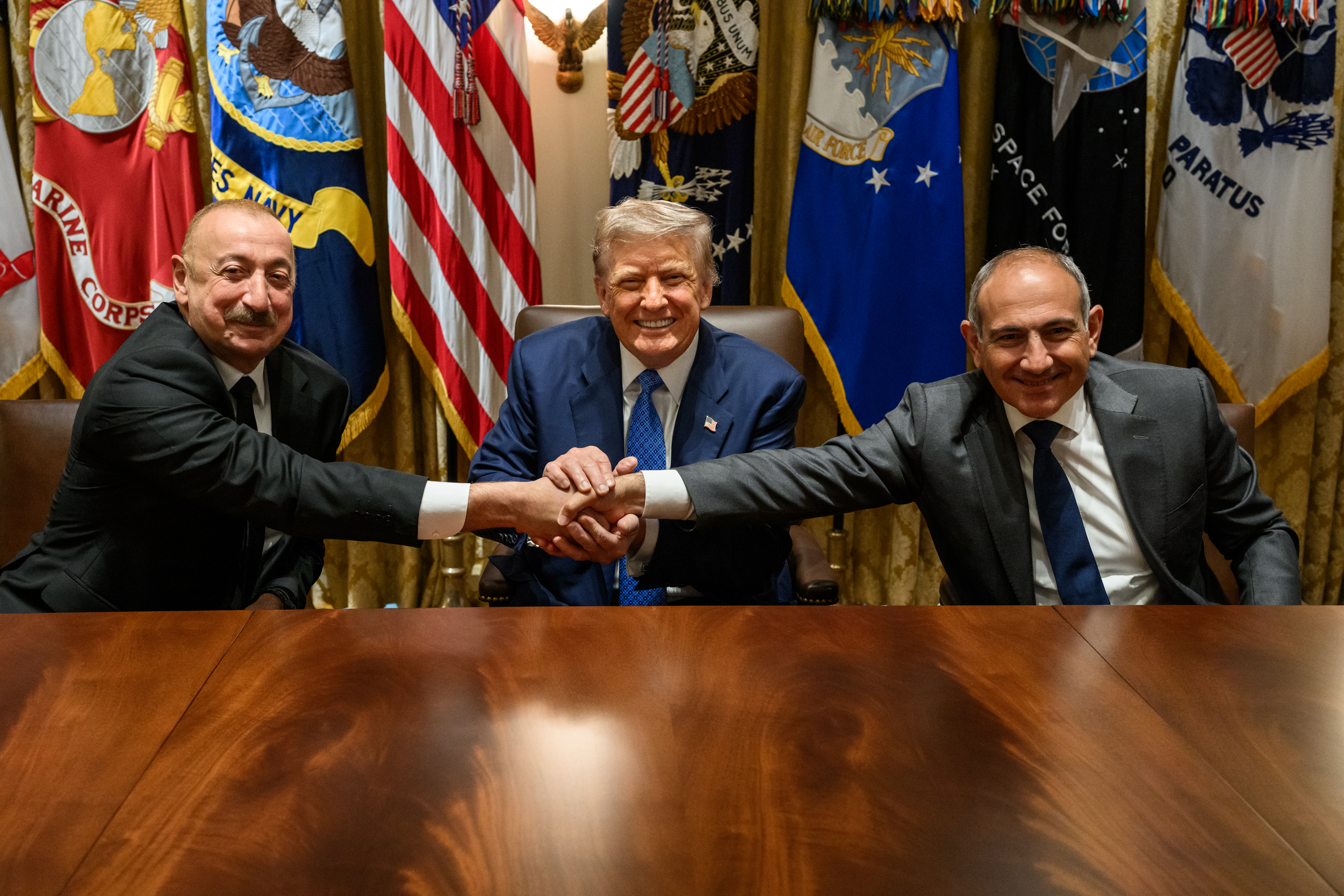
US President Donald Trump with Armenian Prime Minister Nikol Pashinyan and Azerbaijani President Ilham Aliyev in Washington, D.C. in August 2025

The United States recognized the independence of the Armenian Republic on 23 April 1920, when Secretary of State Bainbridge Colby delivered a note to the Representative of the Armenian Republic in Washington, informing him of President Woodrow Wilson’s decision. The note specified that this recognition "in no way predetermines the territorial frontiers, which are matters for later delimitation".

The territory expected to compose the independent Armenian Republic previously had been under the sovereignty of the Ottoman and Russian Empires. At the request of the Paris Peace Conference’s Supreme Council of the Allied Powers, President Wilson arbitrated the boundary to be set between Armenia and Turkey and submitted his determinations to the Supreme Council on 22 November 1920. Prior to Wilson’s decisions, however, the territory expected to compose the Armenian Republic had been attacked by Turkish and Bolshevik troops. By the end of 1920 the Armenian Republic had ceased to exist as an independent state, with its territory either seized by Turkey or established as the Armenian Soviet Republic, which subsequently joined the Soviet Union.

The dissolution of the Soviet Union in December 1991 brought an end to the Cold War and created an opportunity for establishing bilateral relations between the United States with Armenia and other post-Soviet states as they began a political and economic transformation. The United States recognized the independence of Armenia on 25 December 1991, and opened an embassy in Armenia's capital Yerevan in February 1992.

The United States has made a concerted effort to help Armenia and other NIS during their difficult transition from authoritarianism and a planned economy to democracy and a market economy. The cornerstone of this continuing partnership has been the Freedom for Russia and Emerging Eurasian Democracies and Open Markets (FREEDOM) Support Act, enacted in October 1992. Under this and other programs, the United States to date has provided nearly $2 billion in humanitarian and technical assistance for Armenia.

On 27 March 2006, Armenia signed a Millennium Challenge Compact with the United States; the agreement entered into force on 29 September 2006. Provided the Armenian Government makes progress on mutually agreed-upon policy performance criteria (corruption, ruling justly, and investing in people), the agreement will provide $235 million to Armenia over five years to reduce rural poverty through the improvement of rural roads and irrigation networks. In 2013, the United States and Armenia held their first-ever joint military drills, during which Armenian soldiers were trained for their current multi-national peacekeeping operations.

According to the 2016 U.S. Global Leadership Report, 42% of Armenians approve of U.S. leadership, with 31% disapproving and 27% uncertain.

On 24 April 2021, on the Armenian Genocide Remembrance Day, US President Joe Biden referred to the Armenian genocide as "genocide" in a statement released by the White House.

On 10 June 2024, US and Armenian diplomats met in Yerevan and pledged to increase bilateral ties. "The sides positively assessed cooperation to support Armenia's ongoing reforms and democratic progress and noted Armenia's aspirations for closer cooperation with Euro-Atlantic institutions and the West," a joint statement said. The two sides announced that they would deepen ties in the coming year, which will be formalized by signing a deal to upgrade the status of bilateral dialogue to a "Strategic Partnership Commission". This comes as trade turnover between Washington and Yerevan has quadrupled since 2020. Military officials also vowed to establish formal bilateral defense consultations to "regularize planning of defense cooperation objectives." On 14 January 2025, Armenia and the United States signed the Armenia–United States Strategic Partnership Charter. Armenian Prime Minister Nikol Pashinyan, along with Azerbaijani President Ilham Aliyev, signed a peace agreement with US President Donald Trump in the White House on 8 August 2025, ending an over 35-year conflict between Armenia and Azerbaijan.

On 9 February 2026, U.S. Vice President JD Vance visited Armenia and met with Prime Minister Pashinyan, becoming the highest-ranking U.S. official to do so; they discussed the Armenia–Azerbaijan peace agreement and a civil nuclear energy deal. The White House has proposed to build a road and rail corridor through Armenia — which might be lucrative for the U.S. as well —connecting two parts of Azerbaijan.

A parliamentary election will take place on 7 June 2026.

== Trade relations ==
Following Armenia's independence from the Soviet Union in 1991, the United States established diplomatic relations with the country. Since then, the US has supported Armenia in many of its endeavours such as encouraging a peaceful resolution to the Nagorno-Karabakh conflict, reopening the closed borders with Azerbaijan and Turkey, and promoting regional prosperity. The US has many trade agreements with Armenia such as the trade and investment framework agreement (TIFA), and an agreement on trade relations, and a bilateral investment treaty (BAT). The U.S. and Armenia frequently convene over the U.S.-Armenia joint economic task force (USATF) to discuss mutual economic and governmental concerns.

== United States–Armenia economic relations ==
In 1992, Armenia signed three agreements with the United States affecting trade between the two countries. The agreements were ratified by the Armenian parliament in September 1995 and entered into force in the beginning of 1996. They include an "Agreement on Trade Relations", an "Investment Incentive Agreement", and a treaty on the "Reciprocal Encouragement and Protection of Investment" (generally referred to as the Bilateral Investment Treaty, or BIT). Armenia does not have a bilateral taxation treaty with the United States. The 1994 Law on Foreign Investment governs all direct investments in Armenia, including those from the United States.

Approximately 70 American-owned firms currently do business in Armenia, including Dell, Microsoft, and IBM. Recent major American investment projects include the Hotel Armenia/Marriott; the Hotel Ani Plaza; Tufenkian Holdings (carpet and furnishing production, hotels, and construction); several subsidiaries of U.S.-based information technology firms, including Viasphere Technopark, an IT incubator; Synopsys; a Greek-owned Coca-Cola bottling plant; jewelry and textile production facilities; several copper and molybdenum mining companies; and the Hovnanian International Construction Company.

=== U.S. government-funded agencies involved in Armenian economic institutions ===
The U.S. continues to work closely with international financial institutions like the International Monetary Fund and the World Bank to help Armenia in its transition to a free-market economy. Armenia has embarked upon an ambitious reform program, which has resulted in a double-digit GDP growth for the last 6 years. U.S. economic assistance programs, primarily under the administration of the U.S. Agency for International Development (USAID), have three objectives: to promote sustainable private sector economic growth, to strengthen non-executive governmental systems and civil society to build a more robust democracy, and to ensure a smooth transition towards primary healthcare and the rationalization of social support systems of the government. Other agencies, including the Departments of State, Agriculture, Treasury, Defense, Commerce, Energy, Justice, and the Peace Corps sponsor various assistance projects. The United States-Armenia Task Force, established in 2000, is a bilateral commission that meets every 6 months to review the progress and objectives of U.S. assistance to Armenia. During the October 2007 meeting held in Washington, D.C., then-Armenian Prime Minister Serzh Sargsyan met with then-US Secretary of State Condoleezza Rice and then-Under Secretary of State for Economic Affairs Reuben Jeffrey.

Specific USAID programs focus on private sector competitiveness and workforce development in selected industries, including information technology and tourism; development of the financial sector and fiscal authorities to achieve an enabling environment for businesses; and reforms promoting the efficient and safe use of energy and water; democracy and good governance programs, including the promotion of a well-informed and active civil society, support to decentralization of authority, independent justice sector and the parliament to ensure the separation of power; social sector reform, including benefits and public services administration for vulnerable populations; health sector reform, including improvement of primary healthcare (PHC) services with an emphasis on preventive care; strengthening of reproductive, maternal, and child healthcare countrywide to ensure access to quality PHC services in rural areas; public education programs; and training for PHC providers.

The U.S. Department of Agriculture's (USDA) Caucasus Agricultural Development Initiative provides targeted and sustained technical and marketing assistance to small and medium-sized agribusinesses, farmer-marketing associations, and the Government of Armenia. USDA's goal is to sustain the productivity of the agricultural sector by expanding access to markets and credit, increasing efficiency, and modernizing agriculture systems. USDA's priority assistance areas are farm credit, food safety and animal health, support to the Armenian private sector through the NGO CARD. Also, as a training component of USDA projects in Armenia, the U.S. Department of Agriculture's Cochran Fellowship Program provides training to Armenian agriculturists in the United States.

Since Armenia began shifting its strategic orientation from Russia toward closer integration with the United States and the European Union, particularly under Prime Minister Nikol Pashinyan's leadership from 2023 onward, U.S. government-funded agencies have increasingly engaged in supporting Armenia's economic institutions. This pivot has coincided with Armenia's initiation of a long-term EU accession process and the unveiling of domestic reform programs such as "Real Armenia". In this context, various American agencies, including USAID, have played a growing role in fostering economic development, democratic governance, and institutional reform in Armenia. These efforts are often aimed at reducing Armenia's reliance on Russian economic systems and aligning more closely with Western regulatory and financial frameworks. The deepening of U.S.–Armenia economic cooperation has occurred amid heightened domestic political challenges, including rising opposition unity following local elections, such as the April 2025 election of Vardan Gukasyan as mayor of Gyumri; a vocal critic of Pashinyan's Western realignment policies.

== Military cooperation ==
In 2003, Armenia joined the U.S. European Command State Partnership Program.

In May 2016, the commander of the U.S. Army Europe, Lieutenant General Ben Hodges, discussed Armenia's growing military ties with the United States during a meeting with former defence minister Seyran Ohanyan. Hodges also praised a 32-strong unit of Armenian military medics which took part in U.S.-led exercises held in Germany. Ohanyan advised that Armenia was participating in more NATO exercises and agreed to increase cooperation between Armenia's Armed Forces and the U.S. Army Europe.

In January 2019, the United States Department of Defense praised the "selfless contributions of the Armenian armed forces to international operations and peacekeeping missions," highlighting Armenia's commitment to the Resolute Support mission in Afghanistan and recognizing Armenia as a top-five non-NATO contributor to NATO's Kosovo Force. Deputy Assistant Secretary of Defense Laura Cooper also praised the 15 year long partnership between the Armenian military and the Kansas Army National Guard.

Though Armenia is currently a member of the Collective Security Treaty Organization (CSTO), which is headed by Russia, there have been calls for the country to withdraw from the alliance and realign its security needs with NATO and the United States. Some American politicians, such as Sam Brownback, have also campaigned for Armenia to be granted Major non-NATO ally (MNNA) status. On 21 June 2023, Brownback stated "Armenia is a natural long-term ally of the United States. Armenia must be given major non-NATO ally status of the U.S."

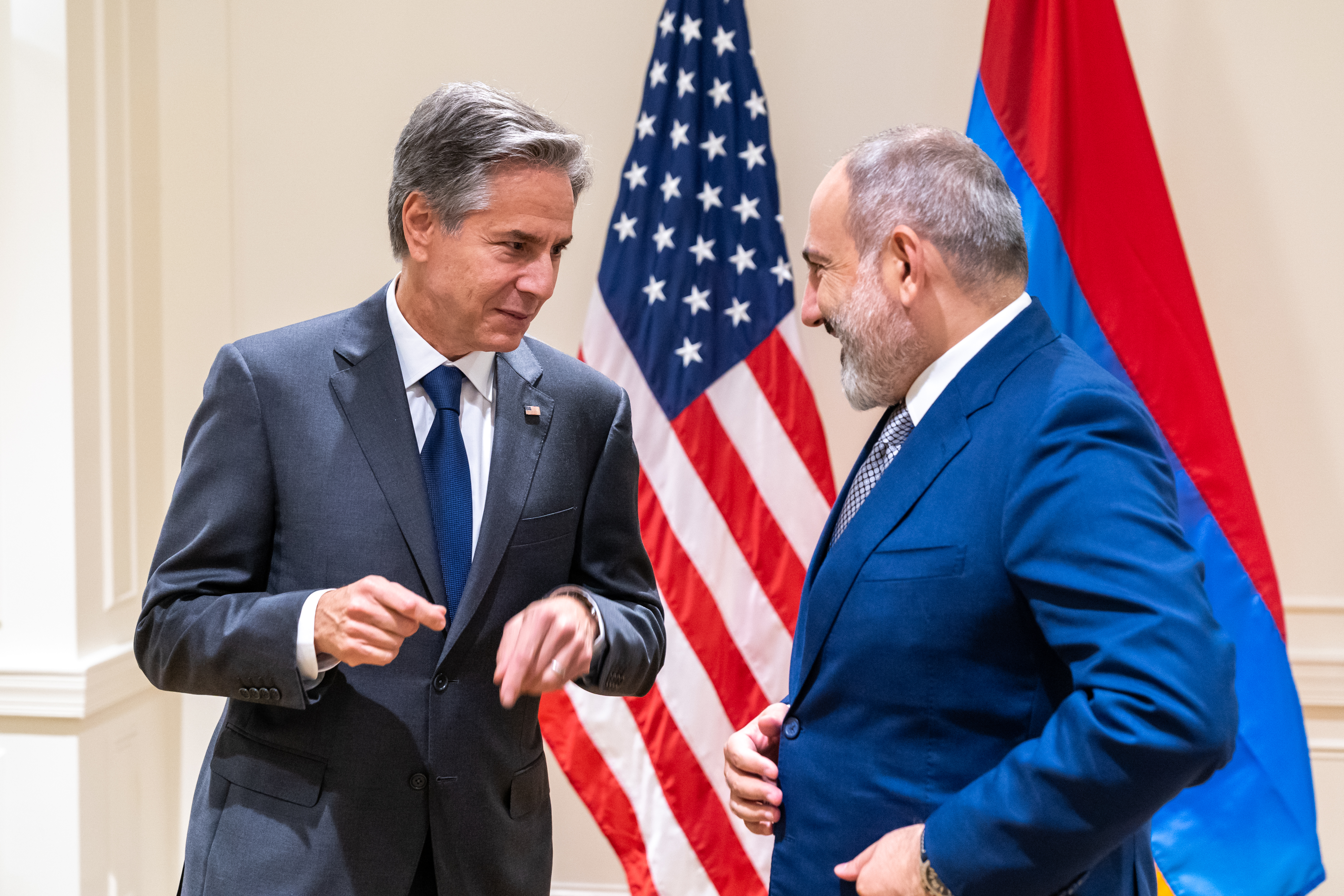
Armenian Prime Minister Nikol Pashinyan (right) with US Secretary of State Antony Blinken in September 2022

On 3 September 2023, during an interview, Armenian prime minister Nikol Pashinyan stated that it was a strategic mistake for Armenia to solely rely on Russia to guarantee its security. Pashinyan confirmed that Armenia is trying to diversify its security arrangements, most notably with the European Union and the United States.

On 11 September 2023, Armenia and the United States held joint military exercises in Armenia for the first time. The Ministry of Defence of Armenia stated that the "Eagle Partner 2023" exercises was focused on preparing the Armed Forces of Armenia to take part in international peacekeeping missions. Colonel Martin O'Donnell, spokesman for the U.S. command, said the exercises are "a vital opportunity for our soldiers from our two nations to build new relationships at the tactical level and to increase interoperability for peacekeeping operations." Approximately 85 U.S. soldiers trained alongside approximately 175 Armenian soldiers during Eagle Partner. Pashinyan confirmed such military cooperation will enable Armenia to forge closer ties with the United States and other Western allies.

== U.S. humanitarian assistance ==
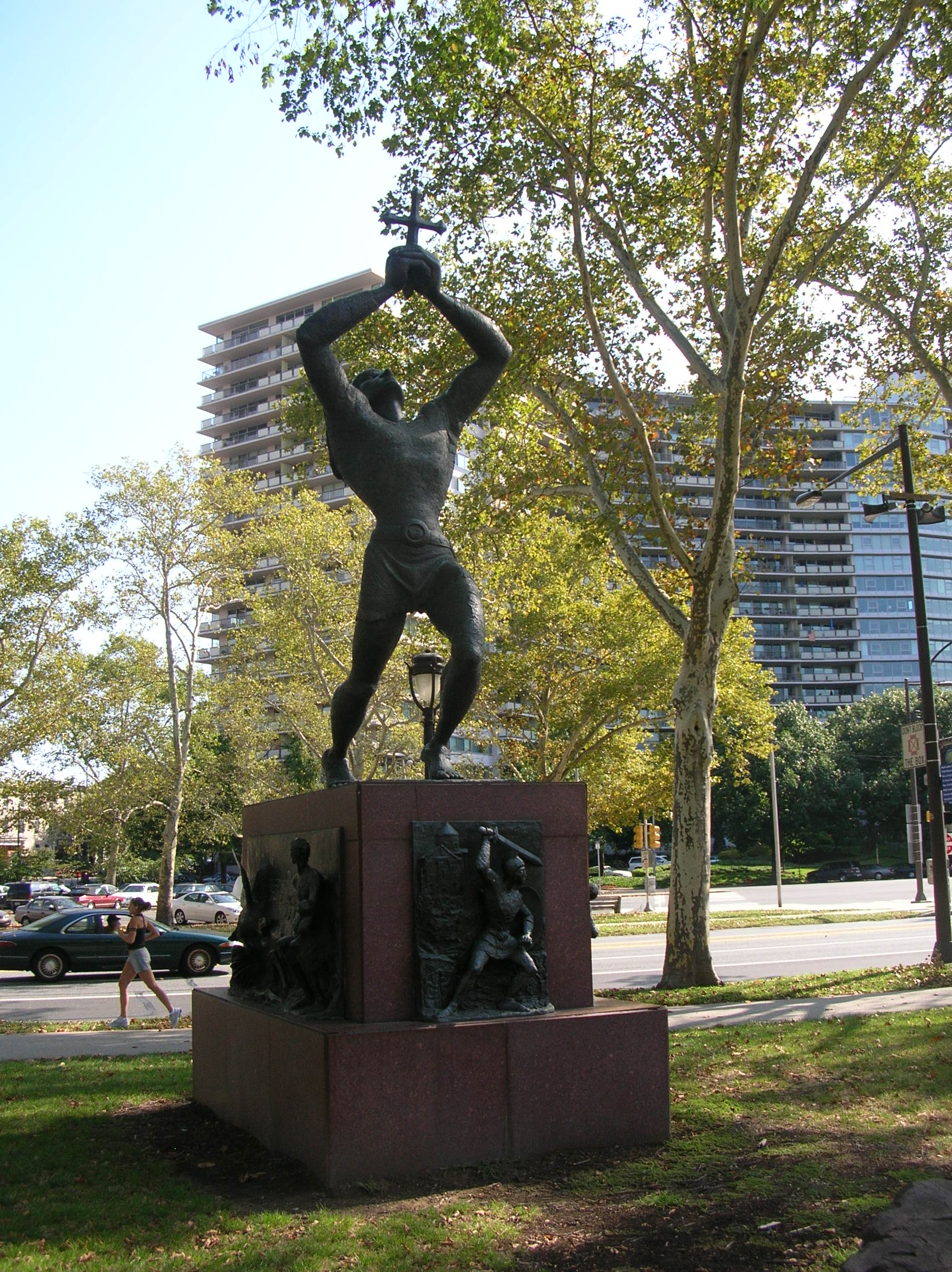
Memorial to the Armenian genocide in Philadelphia

Before Armenia regained its independence, the United States was one of 74 countries that responded by sending aid to the Armenians who had lost their homes and were living in temporary shelters. Through its aid, the U.S. managed to give permanent housing to about 30,000 victims and cleared displaced residents from over 100 buildings.

Over the past 16 years, the U.S. has provided nearly $2 billion in assistance to Armenia, the highest per capita amount in the NIS. Humanitarian aid originally accounted for up to 85% of this total, reflecting the economic paralysis caused by closed borders with Turkey and Azerbaijan related to the Nagorno-Karabakh conflict, destruction in northern Armenia left from the devastating 1988 earthquake and the closure of most of the country's factories.

As conditions in Armenia have improved with the stabilization of the economy and increased energy production—including the restarting of the Armenian Nuclear Power Plant near the capital, U.S. assistance programs have progressed from humanitarian priorities to longer-term development goals.

On 25 May 2017, the Armenian National Committee of America (ANCA) issued a statement against Donald Trump's budget, which would cut 69.6% of the aid to Armenia. The ANCA stated, "We are troubled by Trump's ill-advised and misguided proposal to cut aid to Armenia".

== U.S. government-funded agency involvement in Armenian politics and media ==
Technical assistance and training programs have been provided in municipal administration, intergovernmental relations, public affairs, foreign policy, diplomatic training, rule of law, and development of a constitution. Specific programs are targeted at promoting elections that meet international standards, strengthening political parties, and promoting the establishment of an independent judiciary and independent media. This includes financing for programs that support civil society organizations, local non-governmental organizations (NGO) capacity building, National Assembly professional development, and local and community-level governance.

State Department and USAID educational exchange programs claim to play an important role in supporting democratic and free-market reforms. Assistance in the translation and publication of printed information also has been provided. Exchange programs in the U.S. for Armenian lawyers, judges, political party members, business people, government officials, NGO activists, journalists, and other public figures focus on a range of topics, including the American judicial and political system, privatization, specific business sectors, the media, and civil society. The State Department has funded an ongoing project to provide Internet connectivity to schools at various levels throughout the country; these centers provide both educational and community-building opportunities.

USAID has funded international and domestic groups to monitor national elections. USAID also has funded programs to educate voters and to strengthen the role of an array of civic organizations in the democratic process.

== U.S. discontent on Armenian arms shipments to Iran ==
The 2010 diplomatic cable leaks revealed discontent of United States administrations over Armenia's arms shipments to Iran despite urges from the Federal Government of the United States to apply its containment policy to Iran. In late 2008, American diplomats came to the conclusion that the government of Armenia had been supplying Iran with rockets and machine guns in 2003, subsequently used against American troops in Iraq. The allegations, by the Bush administration, of arms having been supplied to fighters in Iraq by Iran have never been substantiated. U.S. officials later backed down from these claims.

As a result, Deputy Secretary of State at that time John D. Negroponte wrote a letter to the President of Armenia, Serzh Sargsyan in December 2008 expressing "deep concerns about Armenia's transfer of arms to Iran which resulted in the death and injury of U.S. soldiers in Iraq." The cable indicates that "in 2007 some of these weapons were recovered from two Shia militant attacks in which a U.S. soldier was killed and six others were injured in Iraq." One Western diplomat familiar with the incident said the United States had multiple streams of intelligence connecting the Armenian arms shipments to Iran with the deaths of U.S. soldiers in 2007 in Iraq. When Secretary of State Condoleezza Rice confronted President Sargsyan with this intelligence in 2008 on the sidelines of the U.N. General Assembly, he denied knowing anything about the matter. In a letter to Sargsyan, Secretary Rice wrote: "Such cooperation with Iran, a known state sponsor of terrorism and supplier of arms to terrorist groups and other non-state actors, is unacceptable," instructing U.S. diplomats to pressure the Government of Armenia to take responsibility for the transfer and threaten it with sanctions. Assistant Secretary Fried, Deputy Assistant Secretary Bryza, and then Ambassador Yovanovitch also raised deep concerns about Armenia's transfer of arms to Iran which resulted in the death and injury of US soldiers in Iraq.

American intelligence revealed and documented almost all of the details concerning the Armenian weapons deal. The finding confirms that the RPG-22 anti-tank rockets were manufactured at the Vazovski Mashinostroitelni Zavodi and that the machine guns were manufactured by the Bulgarian weapons manufacturer Arsenal. Upon the purchase and subsequent shipment of the weapons to Armenia, they were immediately shipped to Iran. The transaction was made between the partially state-owned company Zao Veber and Abbas Abdi Asjerd, an Iranian arms dealer. It is alleged that the weapons were paid for by the Iranian government, but the money trail was covered by having it go through an Armenian bank.

Expressing the frustration of the United States government, Negroponte wrote to Sargsyan, "Notwithstanding the close relationship between our countries, neither the Administration nor the U.S. Congress can overlook this case... The direct role of high-level Armenian officials and the link of the weapons to an attack on U.S. forces make this case unique and highly troubling. ...By law, the transfer of these weapons requires us to consider whether there is a basis for the imposition of U.S. sanctions. If sanctions are imposed, penalties could include the cutoff of U.S. assistance and certain export restrictions."

The Deputy Secretary noted to Sargsyan that a team will be sent to Armenia to seek written agreement that Armenia will take steps to ensure that it will not become a source of weapons for Iran or other states or groups of concern and that the team would also present additional information that would clarify why the United States is convinced that the transfers happened and make it unreasonable for Sargsyan to continue his denials. According to Der Spiegel, due to the arms transfer to Iran, Sargsyan bore partial responsibility for killing or wounding American soldiers.

At a 14 January 2009 meeting with the then Ambassador of the United States, Mahley with Sargsyan and NSS Chairman Gorik Hakobyan, the Government of Armenia were presented with evidence of weapons purchased by Armenia, shipped to Iran and recovered from Iran-backed Iraqi insurgent groups which fought against United States troops in Iraq. Hakobyan had tried to lay the blame on Bulgaria for diverting the responsibility from Armenia's involvement but Ambassador Mahley presented facts showing the arms transfer and serial numbers of weapons were used to kill an American soldier in an armed attack on United States troops on 31 January 2008. The United States military personnel continued to recover arms from the Sargsyan deal at the hands of Iraqi insurgents. One instance was the recovery of an arms cache in Baghdad on 15 February 2008, which belonged to the Hizballah Brigades, an Iranian-backed Iraqi militant group. Among mostly Iran manufactured weapons in the raid were six Bulgarian RPG-22 anti-tank weapons, production lot and serial numbers of which indicated they were produced by the Bulgarian firm which sold the weapons to Armenia. Similar finds were in mid-March 2008 in Baghdad, when two RPG-22 launch tubes were recovered during the ambush of American troops resulting in injuries of American soldiers. The lot and serial numbers matched and handwritten on both launchers was the Arabic message "Rejoice – Islamic Resistance of Iraq – Hizballah Brigades".

However, in the course of the investigation, Armenian officials accepted the U.S. recommendations regarding border security and unannounced visits by US experts.

== Armenian genocide ==
The Armenian genocide was the systematic mass extermination of 1.5 million Armenians by the Ottoman Turks from 1915 to 1923. The Turkish government has since instituted a century-long campaign of denial, despite there being an overwhelming and abundant international scholarly consensus of the reality of the genocide. The United States had historically been uneasy to anger its NATO ally, Turkey, by recognizing the genocide, as Turkey has diplomatically retaliated against nations such as France, Germany, Italy, and the Netherlands after they each formally recognized the genocide in their respective parliaments.

On 29 October 2019, the United States House of Representatives voted 405–11 in favor of recognition, and the Senate followed on 12 December 2019, passing an identical resolution unanimously. These identical resolutions (H.Res. 296 and S.Res. 150) state that it is the policy of the United States to recognize and officially commemorate the Armenian genocide, to deny association of the US government with denial of the genocide, encourage education and public understanding of the Armenian genocide and emphasize the humanitarian relief effort led by the United States in the form of the Near East Relief to the victims of genocide.

On the 106th year of commemoration of the Armenian genocide, 46th President of the United States Joe Biden officially recognized the Armenian Massacres as genocide. Following Biden's recognition of the genocide, Armenia and the Armenian diaspora welcomed the move with great satisfaction.

On April 24, 2025, during the first Armenian Genocide Remembrance Day of President Donald Trump's second term, the White House issued a statement commemorating the day that did not use the term "genocide". This was seen as a reversal after Biden formally recognized the Armenian genocide in 2021. The second Trump administration continues to avoid using the term "genocide", instead continuing to refer to the events as the Medz Yeghern (Armenian for 'Great Catastrophe') and labeling April 24 as only "Armenian Remembrance Day".

== Nagorno-Karabakh conflict ==
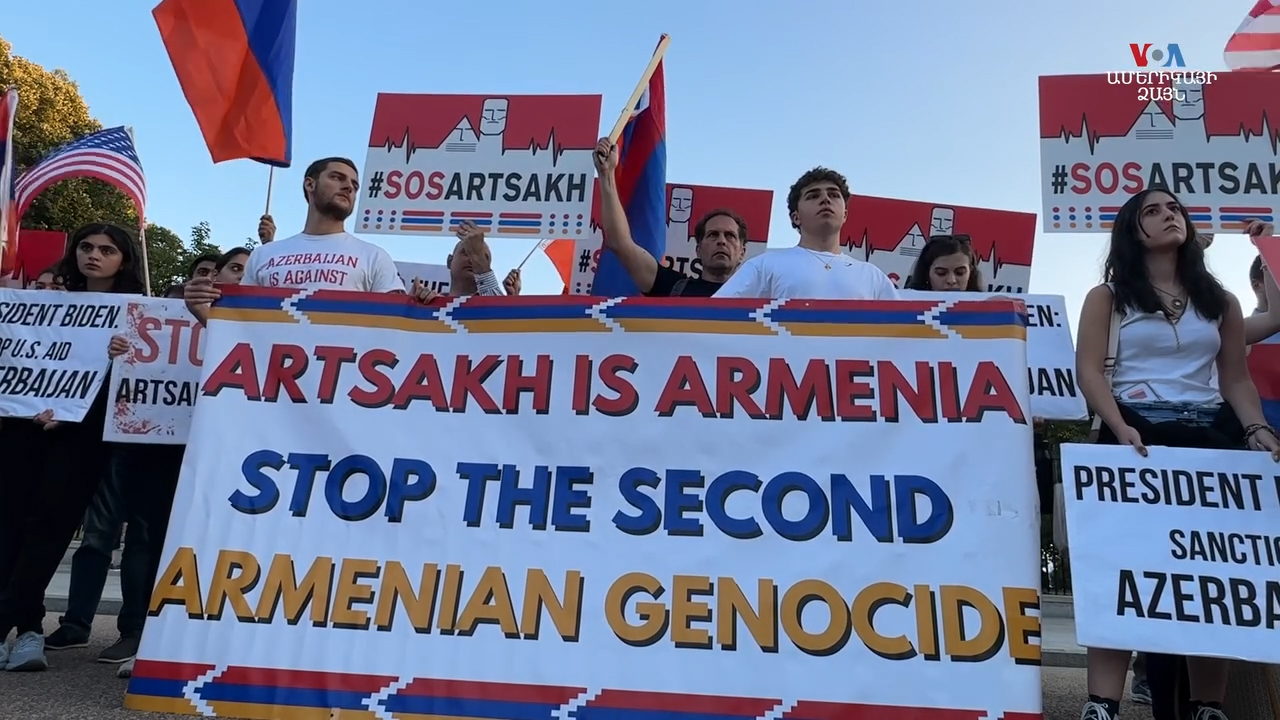
Armenians in Washington held a protest in front of the White House due to Azerbaijan's attack on Artsakh in September 2023

The United States has not recognized Artsakh as an independent state. However, it has advocated for peace in the South Caucasus region as well as attempts to solve the problem between Armenia and Azerbaijan, an ally of Turkey. However, when the 2020 Nagorno-Karabakh war broke out, Turkish President Recep Tayyip Erdoğan blamed the United States of providing lethal weapons to Armenia in the war, which was denied by Washington. Subsequently, relations between Turkey and its ally Azerbaijan towards the United States worsened, and the United States imposed embargoes on Turkey in December the same year. Meanwhile, as tensions between Turkey and the United States grew, relations between Armenia and the U.S. improved.

== Diplomatic representatives ==
=== Officials of the US ===
- United States Ambassador to Armenia—Kristina Kvien
- Deputy Chief of Mission—Chip Laitinen

=== Officials of Armenia ===
- Armenian Ambassador to the United States—Lilit Makunts

== Resident diplomatic missions ==
of Armenia in the United States

- Washington, D.C. (Embassy)
- Glendale (suburb of Los Angeles) (Consulate-General)

of the United States in Armenia

- Yerevan (Embassy)

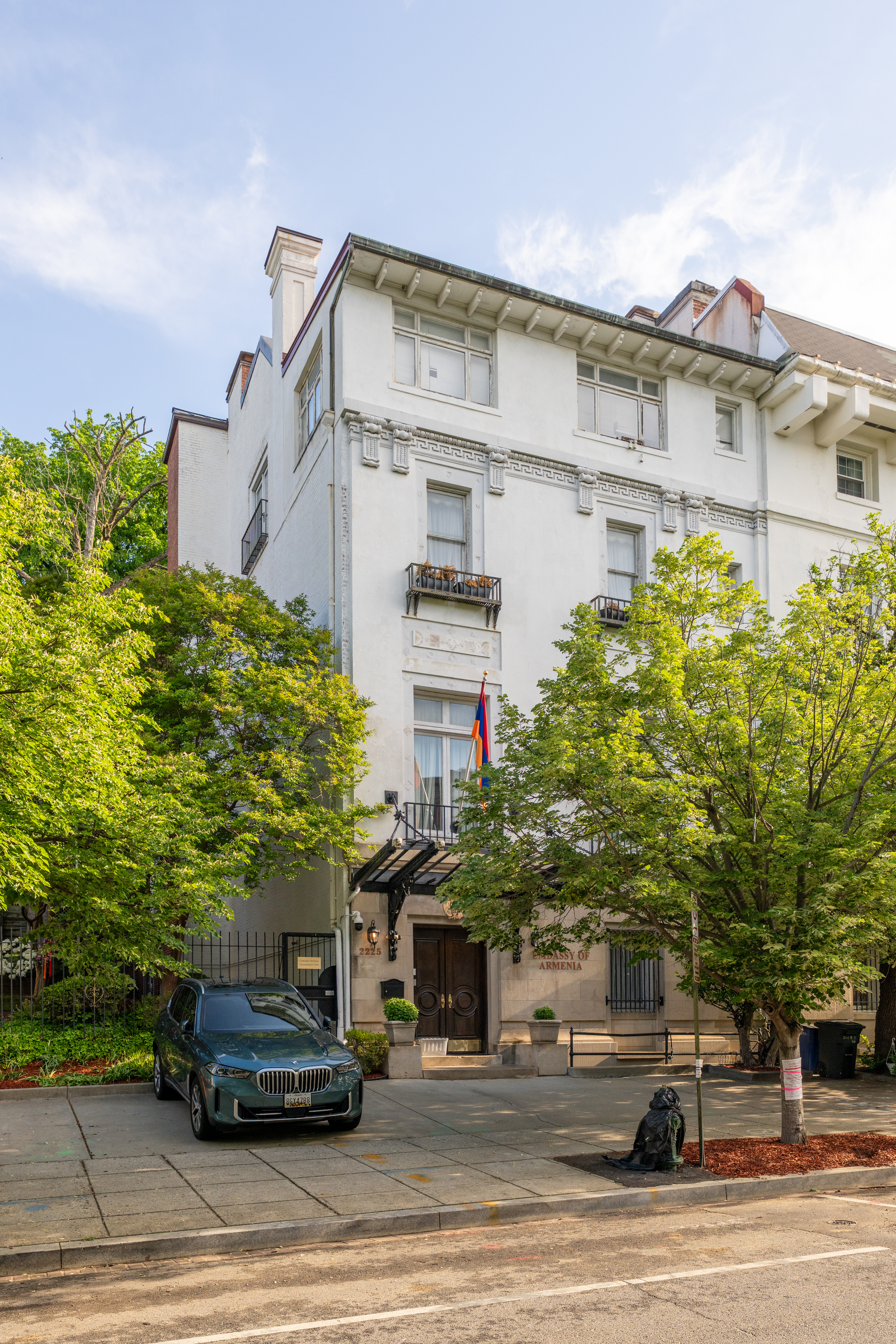
Embassy of Armenia in Washington, D.C.

Consulate-General of Armenia in Los Angeles

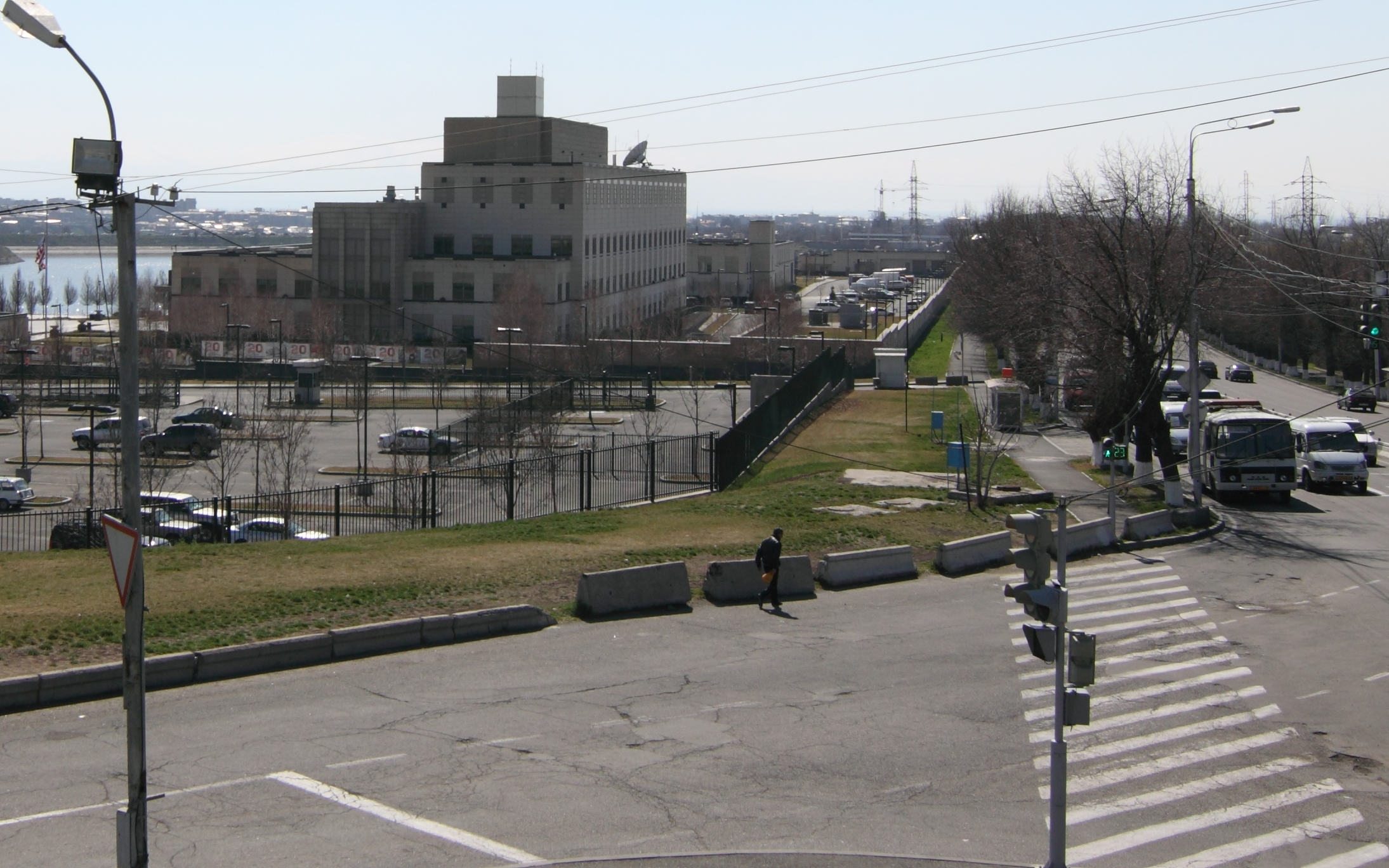
Embassy of the United States in Yerevan

== See also ==
- Armenian Americans
- Artsakh–United States relations
- Congressional Armenian Caucus
- Foreign relations of Armenia
- Foreign relations of the United States
