= Army Chaplaincy Program of the Armenian Church =

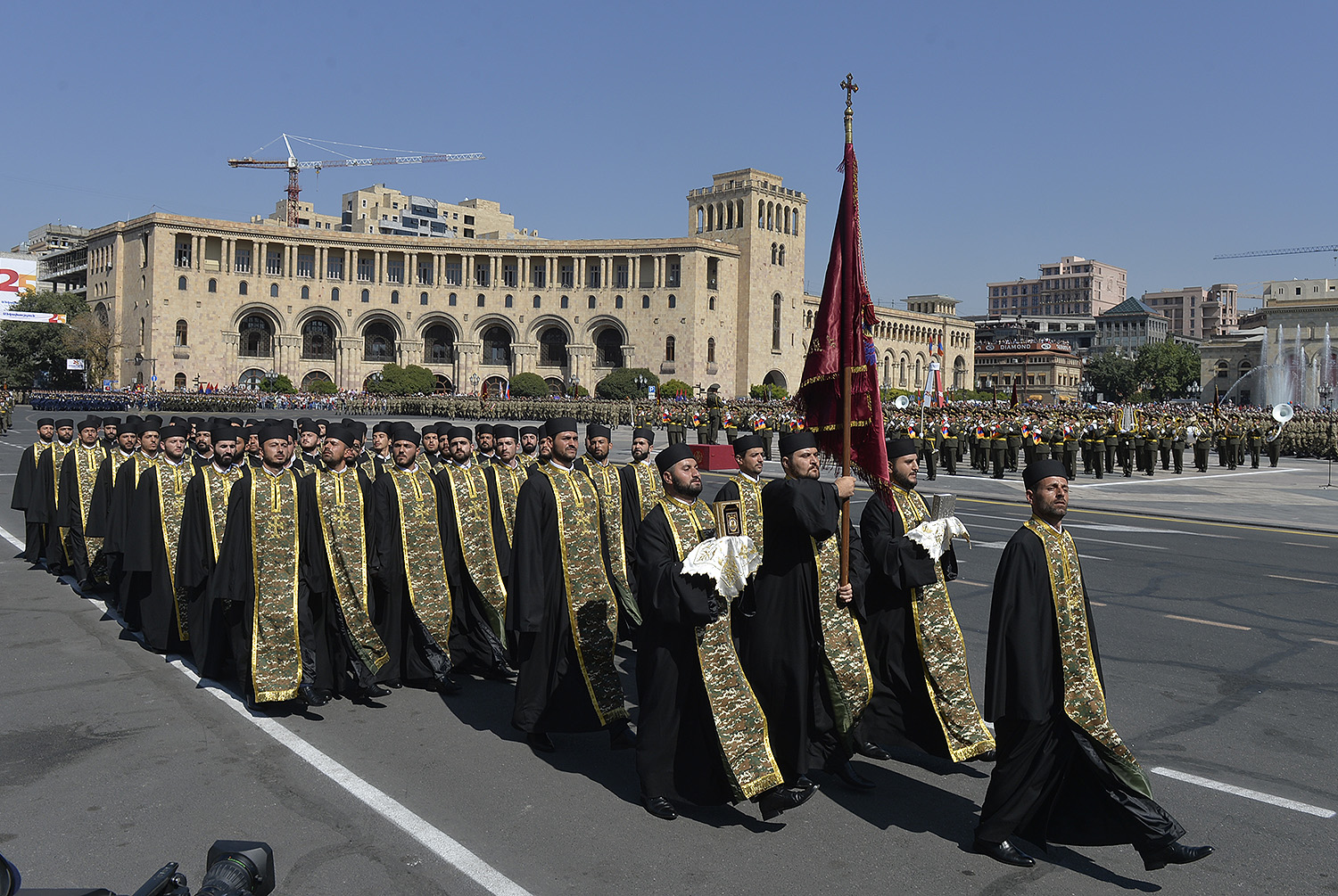
Chaplains marching in 2016.

The Army Chaplaincy Program of the Armenian Church (Armenian: Հայ եկեղեցու բանակային մատուռների ծրագիր) is a 50-member officer unit within the Armenian Armed Forces that provides ordained military chaplains and clergy to personnel of the Armenian Army. All members of the unit come from the Armenian Apostolic Church (the national church of Armenia). It is jointly funded and sponsored by the Ministry of Defence of Armenia and the church. All army chaplains are commissioned officers in the armed forces who hold a military rank. They organize various religious programs in the military, including delivering lectures and prayers. It takes part in many ceremonies such as the induction of cadets of the Vazgen Sargsyan Military University. The current head of the military clergy is Father Movses Vardapet Sargsyan.

== History ==
External videos
- Chaplaincy Program in the Armenian Army (Preparations For the Parade)

The first religious advisors were assigned to the army of the First Republic of Armenia. There were attempts made to formalize this service with creation of by-laws. Today's program was established on 13 November 1997 at a joint initiative of Catholicos Karekin I and Defense Minister Vazgen Sargsyan. The same year, a Memorandum of Understanding was signed between the Mother See of Holy Etchmiadzin and the Defense Ministry. The first Army Chaplain to be appointed was Archimandrite Vrtanes Abrahamian. In February 2003, it participated in the 14th Annual Conference of Chaplains of NATO member-countries, the first event of its kind that the program has participated in. It has contacts with the chaplaincy programs of the United Kingdom, France and Greece, with the army chaplains of foreign countries having paid official visits to Armenia in years past. In 2010, the Bible Society of Armenia published copies of the New Testament for soldiers in units along the border of Armenia and Nagorno-Karabakh. Since 2011, a combined clergy company has taken part in the quinquennial Armenian Independence Day Parade on Republic Square in Yerevan. When on parade, the company carries its own battle color which was consecrated on 16 September 2011 in the presence of various military and religious officials such as Deputy Minister of Defense Vladimir Gasparyan. Before the start of the military parade in 2016, Bishop Vrtanes Abrahamyan read the "Lord's Prayer" to the troops.

== Heads ==
The following have served as heads of the program:

- Hieromonk Arshen Sanosyan (December 1999-2004)
- Norayr Simonyan (2004-October 2007)
- Bishop Vrtanes Abrahamian (October 2007-January 2021)
- Father Enovk Yesayan (acting, January-March 2021)
- Father Movses Vardapet Sargsyan (since January 2021)
