= Armenia–United States Strategic Partnership Charter =

Charter on Strategic Partnership between the Republic of Armenia and the United States of America
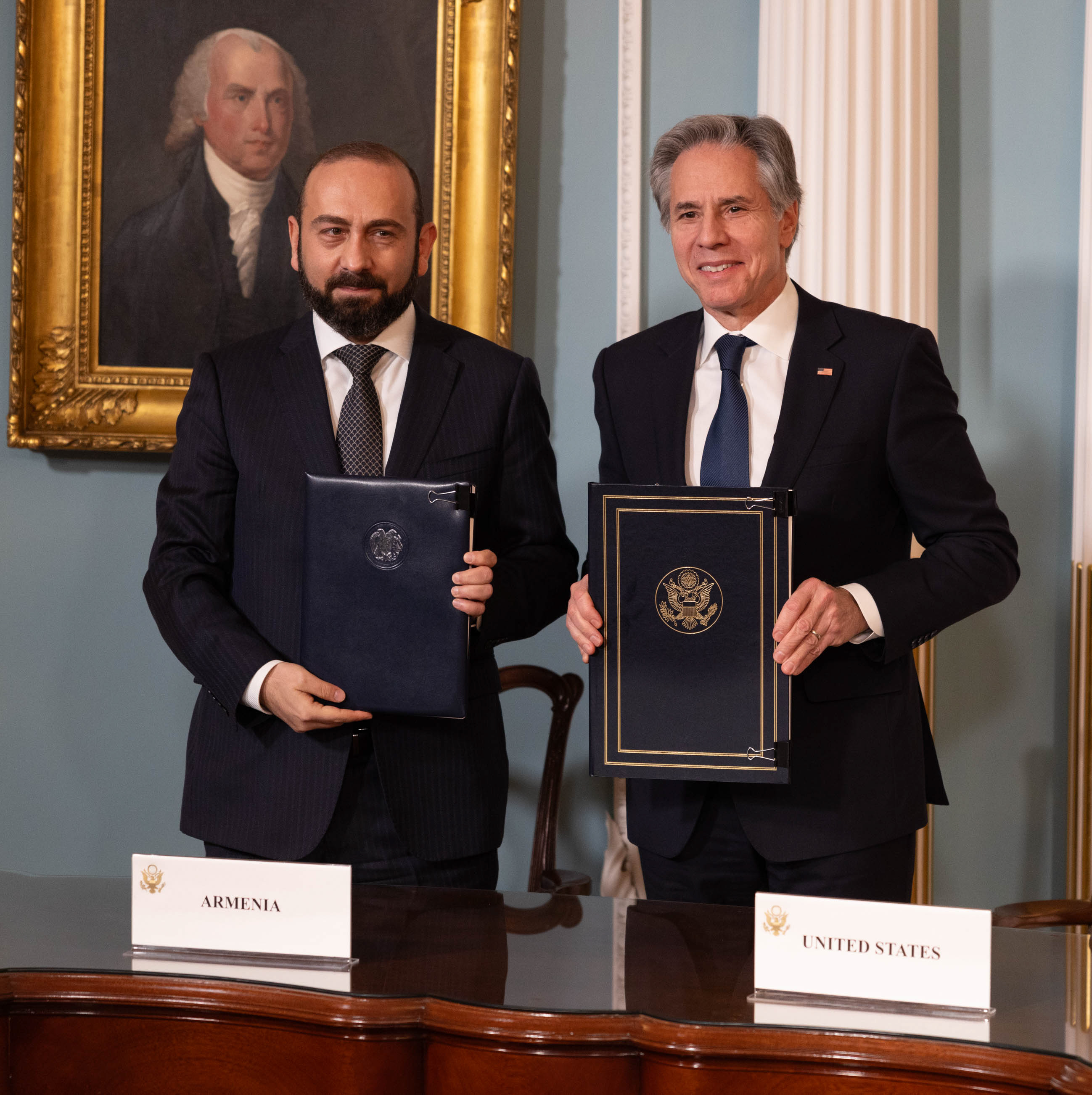
- Ararat Mirzoyan Foreign Minister of Armenia and U.S. Secretary of States Antony Blinken in a Strategic Partnership Commission in Washington D.C.
- Type: Strategic partnership agreement
- Signed: 14 January 2025
- Location: Washington, D.C., U.S.
- Effective: 2025
- Condition: Ratified by both parties
- Signatories: Armenia; United States
- Ratifiers: Government of Armenia; Government of the United States
- Languages: English and Armenian

The Armenia–United States Strategic Partnership Charter is a treaty between Armenia and the United States aimed at strengthening bilateral relations through cooperation on various issues, including democracy, sovereignty, territorial integrity, and economic and military reforms. The full name of the charter is "Charter on Strategic Partnership between the Republic of Armenia and the United States of America."

On 14 January 2025, Armenian Foreign Minister Ararat Mirzoyan and U.S. Secretary of State Antony Blinken signed a document in Washington, D.C. formalizing the strategic partnership. The agreement is based on shared values such as the promotion of democracy, support for sovereignty, and the inviolability of borders. While the partnership provides for U.S. assistance in Armenia's military and economic reforms, it does not include direct military intervention by the United States in the event of conflict.

The initiative to elevate relations between Armenia and the United States to a strategic partnership was first announced by Armenian Prime Minister Nikol Pashinyan on 4 July 2024. Pashinyan expressed Armenia's readiness to strengthen ties with the United States at a strategic level.

== Implementation of the Charter ==
The Spokesperson for the Ministry of Foreign Affairs of Armenia, Ani Badalyan, confirmed that "The Charter defines the strategic nature of the partnership between the two countries and simultaneously launches a commission. This commission will serve as the platform through which the parties will work to realize the goals set forth in the Charter and discuss and coordinate cooperation in the sectorial areas outlined within it."

== Analysis ==
Armenian analyst Benyamin Poghosyan compared the agreement to a similar one signed between the U.S. and Georgia in January 2009. However, Poghosyan noted that the Georgia–United States agreement does not include the same security guarantees provided by the U.S. to countries like Japan, South Korea, or the Philippines. Tigran Grigoryan, Director of the Regional Center for Democracy and Security in Yerevan, says the document strengthens bilateral relations and creates opportunities for closer cooperation in key areas.

=== Foreign policy shift of Armenia ===
A shift in Armenia's foreign policy became evident in late 2022, when Russia and the Collective Security Treaty Organization (CSTO) did not respond to Armenia's requests for military assistance following an Azerbaijani military incursion into Armenian territory. In the aftermath, Armenia began distancing itself from Russia, and in February 2024, Prime Minister Pashinyan announced Armenia's freeze on CSTO membership. In December 2024, Pashinyan declared that the changes in Armenia's relationship with the CSTO were "irreversible".

Armenian officials have taken steps to formalize the country's improving relationship with both the United States and the European Union. On 12 February 2025, Armenia's parliament approved a bill officially endorsing Armenia's EU accession. The passing of the bill was seen as the first step towards Armenia's EU accession.

== Public opinion ==
A public opinion survey conducted in January 2025 by consulting firm MPG found that a majority of Armenians (61.7%) expressed positive opinions about the Armenia–United States Strategic Partnership Charter.

== Reactions ==
- Armenia: A group of Armenian NGOs released a statement welcoming the signing of the Strategic Partnership Charter between Armenia and the US. The statement noted that "the partnership opens new opportunities, not only for Armenia but for the entire region, contributing to regional security, peaceful and dignified coexistence, and economic cooperation" and that "the values of democracy, human rights, and the rule of law, the strengthening of which will undoubtedly contribute to Armenia's development, sovereignty, and security." Signatories include the Open Society Foundations, Helsinki Citizens' Assembly–Vanadzor, and the Union of Informed Citizens.
- Russia: Russian press secretary Dmitry Peskov stated that "The United States has never played a particularly stabilizing role in the South Caucasus - one could even say the opposite. In the context of these 'opposite' actions, the U.S. is certainly trying in every possible way to pull more and more countries into its wake. But this is the absolutely sovereign right of our Armenian friends."
- United States: U.S. Secretary of State Antony Blinken stated "this marks a significant milestone in the relationship between the United States and Armenia. We're establishing our U.S.-Armenia Strategic Partnership Commission. This commission gives us a framework to expand our bilateral cooperation in a number of key areas: economic matters, security and defense, democracy, justice, inclusion, and people-to-people exchanges. Each of these is a shared interest that forms the bedrock of our relationship and our partnership," during the signing ceremony.

=== International organizations ===
- Freedom House welcomed the signing of the charter, calling it "a testament to Armenia's ongoing progress and dedication to democratic development."

== See also ==
- Armenia–NATO relations
- Armenia–United States relations
- Congressional Armenian Caucus
- Euro-Atlantic Partnership Council
- Foreign relations of Armenia
- Foreign relations of the United States
- Individual Partnership Action Plan
- Kansas–Armenia National Guard Partnership
- Partnership for Peace
