= Embassy of the United States, Yerevan =

United States diplomatic mission in Armenia

Embassy of the United States in Yerevan
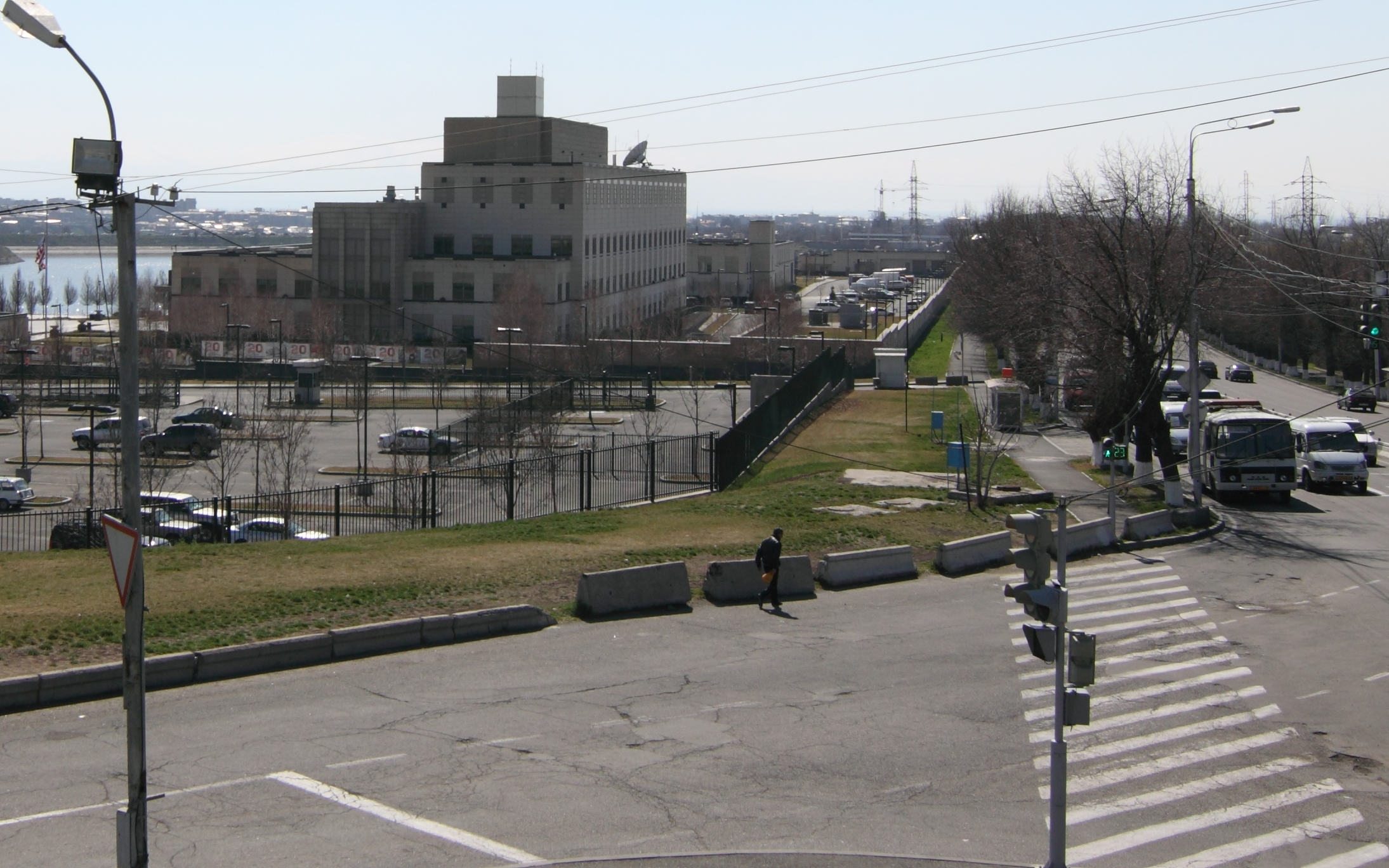
- Location: Yerevan, Armenia
- Address: 1 American Avenue Yerevan 0082, Armenia
- Coordinates: 40°9′54″N 44°28′54″E
- Ambassador: Kristina Kvien
- Jurisdiction: Armenia
- Website: Official website

The Embassy of the United States of America to Armenia (Armenian: Հայաստանում ԱՄՆ-ի դեսպանատուն) is the diplomatic mission of the United States to Armenia. It is located adjacent to Lake Yerevan along the Yerevan-Etchmiadzin highway. The site occupies an area of 90,469 square meters (22 acres); which is currently the second largest land parcel by area on which a U.S. Embassy had been built on when it was completed in 2005, after the embassy in Baghdad.

The embassy serves as a symbol of the ongoing partnership between the United States and Armenia, as the two nations share membership in several international organizations, including the United Nations, Euro-Atlantic Partnership Council, Organization for Security and Cooperation in Europe, International Monetary Fund, World Bank, and World Trade Organization.

== History ==
Before the establishment of the current embassy, the United States had diplomatic presence in the region, with a consulate in Ezerum, Armenia (now Erzurum, Turkey) in 1896 during Ottoman rule. However, due to the shifting political landscapes, the consulate was relocated to Trebizond, Turkey, in 1904. The United States recognized the independence of Armenia on 23 April 1920, but the establishment of the Armenian Soviet Socialist Republic, which became a member of the Soviet Union, led to the cessation of Armenia's status as an independent state.

On 25 December 1991, President George H. W. Bush acknowledged Armenia's status as a sovereign nation in an address concerning the dissolution of the Soviet Union. The American Embassy in Yerevan was opened on 3 February 1992, with Steven Mann serving as the Chargé d'Affaires ad interim.

== See also ==
- Armenia–United States relations
- Ambassadors of Armenia to the United States
- Ambassadors of the United States to Armenia
- Embassy of Armenia, Washington, D.C.
- Foreign relations of the United States
