= Artsakh–United States relations =

- Republic of Artsakh: United States

During its existence, the Republic of Artsakh and the United States did not have official diplomatic relations as the United States was among the majority of countries that did not recognize Artsakh as a sovereign nation and instead recognized the region of Artsakh, or Nagorno-Karabakh, as part of Azerbaijan. Despite no formal relations, the Republic of Artsakh had a representative office in Washington, D.C. since November 1997. The office was closed down after the dissolution of Artsakh and its absorption into Azerbaijan in 2023.

== History ==
From 1991 to 1994 land mines that were placed in the Nagorno-Karabakh region from the first Nagorno-Karabakh War have been part of an ongoing demining operation largely funded by the United States Agency for International Development (USAID). The USAID has been working closely with the HALO Trust, a UK-based demining NGO, is the only international organization conducting demining in Nagorno Karabakh. They have destroyed 180,858 small arms ammunition, 48,572 units of "other explosive items", 12,423 cluster bombs, 8,733 anti-personnel landmines, and 2,584 anti-tank landmines between 2000 and 2016. By 2018, they had cleared 88% of the territory's minefields, with a target to clear the rest by 2020. The main cities of Stepanakert and Shusha, as well as the main north–south highway, have been cleared and are safe for travel.

In April 2001, representatives of Armenia, Azerbaijan, France, Russia and the United States met in Paris and in Key West, Florida to resolve the dispute over Nagorno-Karabakh. Despite rumors that the parties were close to a solution, the Azerbaijani authorities – both during Heydar Aliyev's tenure as President of Azerbaijan and after the accession of his son Ilham Aliyev in the October 2003 elections, have firmly denied that any agreement was reached in Paris or Key West.

In June 2006, talks were held at the Polish embassy in Bucharest attended by American, Russian, and French diplomats. The talks lasted over 40 minutes. Earlier, Armenian President Robert Kocharyan announced that he was ready to "continue dialogue with Azerbaijan for the settlement of the Nagorno-Karabakh conflict and with Turkey on establishing relations without any preconditions". According to the Armenian foreign minister, Vartan Oskanian, no progress was made at this latest meeting. Both presidents failed to reach a consensus on the issues from the earlier Rambouillet conference. He noted that the Kocharyan-Aliyev meeting was held in a normal atmosphere. "Nevertheless," he added, "the foreign ministers of the two countries are commissioned to continue talks over the settlement of the Nagorno-Karabakh conflict and try to find common points before the next meeting of the presidents." The major disagreement between both sides at the Bucharest conference was the status of Artsakh. Azerbaijan's preferred solution would be to give Artsakh the "highest status of autonomy adopted in the world". Armenia, on the other hand, endorsed a popular vote by the inhabitants of Artsakh to decide their future, a position that was also taken by the international mediators. On June 27, the Armenian foreign minister said both parties agreed to allow the residents of Artsakh to vote regarding the future status of the region. The Azerbaijani Ministry of Foreign Affairs officially refuted that statement. According to Azeri opposition leader Isa Gambar, however, Azerbaijan did indeed agree to the referendum. Although no official agreement came from the meeting.

The "Prague Process" overseen by the OSCE Minsk Group was brought into sharp relief in the summer of 2006 with a series of rare public revelations seemingly designed to jump-start the stalled negotiations. After the release in June of a paper outlining its position, which had until then been carefully guarded, U.S. State Department official Matthew Bryza told Radio Free Europe that the Minsk Group favored a referendum in Karabakh that would determine its final status. The referendum, in the view of the OSCE, should take place not in Azerbaijan as a whole, but in Artsakh only. This was a blow to Azerbaijan, and despite talk that their government might eventually seek a more sympathetic forum for future negotiations, this hasn't happened.

In an annual Country Reports on Human Rights Practices from 2006, released on March 6, 2007, by the United States State Department stated "Armenia continues to occupy the Azerbaijani territory of Nagorno-Karabakh and seven surrounding Azerbaijani territories. During the year incidents along the militarized line of contact separating the sides again resulted in numerous casualties on both sides".

After the 2015 Nagorno-Karabakh parliamentary election the United States refused to recognize the legitimacy of the results. Jeff Rathke, the then-State Department acting spokesman stated, "The United States does not recognize Nagorno-Karabakh as an independent sovereign state, and accordingly, we will not accept the results of the elections on 3 May."

Artsakh government officials regularly maintain contact with members of the United States Congress. On March 14, 2018, the then-President of Artsakh Bako Sahakyan visited Washington, D.C., and met with Congressmen and Senators, including members of the foreign relations committee, to discuss the settlement of the Karabakh conflict. A reception was organized celebrating the thirtyth anniversary of the Artsakh Movement. President Sahakyan awarded a group of Congressmen and Senators with state honors for contributing to the development of Artsakh-American relations and for supporting Artsakh.

In October 2019, the Foreign Minister of Artsakh noted that the authorities of the Republic attach great importance to the relations between Artsakh and the United States at various levels. The Minister also stated his appreciation of the United States for financial aid and support for the peaceful resolution of the conflict and hoped for further developing cooperation during a meeting with US Congress members.

Three resolutions have been introduced in the United States House of Representatives, one in 2018, one in 2019, and one in 2020, affirming support for supporting visits and communication on all levels of government in the United States between officials of Artsakh and the executive and legislative branches of the United States, representatives of state and local governments, and representatives of American civil society. The resolutions also call for the full and direct participation of the Republic of Artsakh in negotiations regarding its future. However, no action has been taken on these resolutions.

In response to the 2023 Artsakhian presidential election the United States refused to recognize the legitimacy of the results. Spokesperson for the State Department Matthew Miller stated, "As we have said in the past, we do not recognize Nagorno-Karabakh as an independent and sovereign state and therefore we do not recognize the results of those so-called presidential elections that were announced over the last few days".

== Recognition ==
U.S. states that recognized Artsakh highlighted in dark green as of October 2017.

At the federal level of the U.S. government, there is no recognition of Artsakh, but recognition exists at the state and local levels. Ten states, ten cities, three California counties, one Nevada county, and four New Jersey boroughs have recognized Artsakh as an independent nation as of 2021.

=== States ===
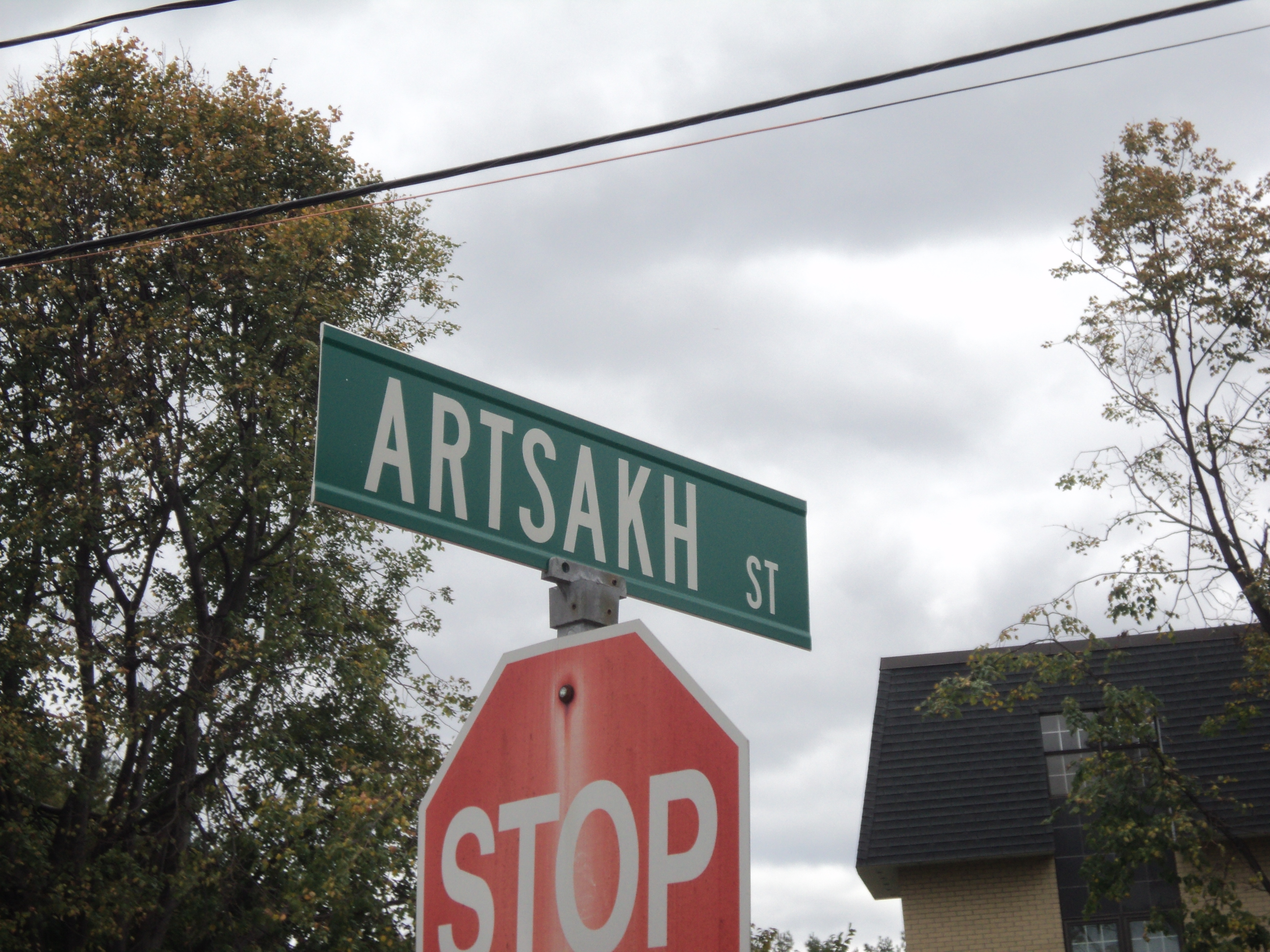
Artsakh Street in Watertown, Massachusetts

In May 2012, the Rhode Island House of Representatives in the United States passed a resolution calling on then-President Barack Obama and the United States Congress to recognize the Republic of Artsakh.

In August 2012, the Massachusetts House of Representatives passed a similar resolution.

On April 10, 2013, the Maine House of Representatives and Senate passed a resolution accepting Artsakh's independence and urging President Barack Obama to also accept Artsakh's independence. But on April 30, the motion was receded.

In May 2013, the Louisiana State Senate passed a resolution accepting Artsakh's independence and expressed support for the Republic of Artsakh's efforts to develop as a free and independent nation.

In May 2014, the California State Assembly passed a measure recognizing Artsakh's independence with a 70–2 vote. The measure also called for President Barack Obama, and the U.S. Congress to recognize the Republic of Artsakh. In August 2014, the California State Senate, passed a unanimous measure in a 23–0 vote to recognize Artsakh's independence.

On March 2, 2016, the Georgia House of Representatives passed a measure recognizing Artsakh. On March 30, 2016, Hawaii unanimously voted to recognize the Republic of Artsakh.

In September 2017, the Michigan Senate passed a resolution to recognize Artsakh while encouraging the American federal government to do so along with expanding economic and cultural ties.

On April 24, 2019, the Colorado Senate passed a bill recognizing Artsakh, the Armenian genocide, and the destruction of Armenia culture heritage in the Nakhchivan Autonomous Republic while declaring April 24 as "Colorado Day of the Remembrance of the Armenian Genocide".

In May 2020, the Minnesota Senate recognized Artsakh's independence.

In June 2021, the New Jersey Senate passed a resolution recognizing Artsakh while reaffirming the state's commitment to recognizing the Armenian genocide.

=== Counties and Boroughs ===
==== Counties ====
On April 23, 2013, Fresno County, California recognized Artsakh's independence which called upon the state legislature to follow suit.

In November 2020, Clark County, Nevada recognized Artsakh.

In December 2020, Orange County, California recognized Artsakh with April 24 as a day of remembrance for the victims of the Armenian genocide.

==== Boroughs ====
On October 15, 2020, Fort Lee, New Jersey recognized Artsakh.

In November 2020, Englewood, Ridgefield, and Cliffside Park, New Jersey recognized Artsakh.

=== Cities ===
On September 25, 2005, Montebello, California became the sister city for Stepanakert. However, the city has never formally recognized Artsakh or its independence. On November 18, 2015, the former mayor of Montebello, Jack Hadjinian, visited Artsakh meeting with then-President Bako Sahakyan.

On November 26, 2013, Highland, California recognized Artsakh, calling on President Obama and the U.S. Congress to follow suit and became a sister city with Berdzor.

In January 2014, the Los Angeles city council recognized Artsakh's independence.

On April 20, 2016, Honolulu recognized Artsakh.

On September 21, 2016, Denver, Colorado recognized the independence of Artsakh and officially declaring September 21, 2016, as "Armenian Independence Day for the Armenian homeland of Armenia and Artsakh".

In October 2020, the following cities recognized Artsakh:

- Fitchburg, Massachusetts (October 19)
- Fowler, California (October 21)
- Glendale, California (October 27) On September 13, 2018, California State Senator, Anthony Portantino, then-Mayor of Glendale, Zareh Sinanyan, and Glendale city clerk Ardashes Kassakhian, met with the Artsakh State Minister, Grigory Martirosyan, discussing economic relations and the opening of an Artsakh street in Glendale for the following October. A plan which was backed by the Glendale City Council. The following October, a street was renamed Artsakh Avenue.

In 2021, Artsakh was recognized by:

- Twin Falls, Idaho on January 4.
- West Hollywood, California on January 19.
- Burbank, California on March 3. Burbank in the resolution ended its sister city status with Hadrut after the town was captured by Azerbaijan during the 2020 Nagorno-Karabakh war.
- Oxford, Ohio on March 23.
- Rancho Cordova, California on April 19. On January 28, the mayor of Racho Cordova, Garrett Gatewood, issued a proclamation recognizing Artsakh as a free and independent nation.

=== Refusal of recognition ===
In April 2014, the Vermont Senate rebuffed a resolution recognizing Artsakh as which would have called on President Obama and the U.S. Congress to follow suit. Azeri representatives met with senators stating that passing the resolution "would jeopardize the partnership between Azerbaijan and the United States, which share interests in oil and the war in Afghanistan." According to State Senator, Jeanette White, the State Department urged senators not to pass the resolution.

==== Refusal of recognizing Artsakh as Azerbaijani territorial integrity ====
The following States refused to recognize Artsakh as the territorial integrity of Azerbaijan, but haven't recognized Artsakh.

- In February 2014, the South Dakota House of Representatives rejected a resolution recognizing Artsakh as the territorial integrity of Azerbaijan.
- In March 2014, the Wyoming House of Representatives voted against recognizing Artsakh as part of Azerbaijan in a 35 to 25 vote. In the same month, a Tennessee House of Representatives panel rejected a bill recognizing Artsakh as part of Azerbaijan.
- In April 2014, the Mississippi State Senate rejected a motion to recognize Artsakh as part of Azerbaijan which would have called upon President Obama and the U.S. Congress to do the same.
- In March 2016, the Kentucky Senate withdrew a resolution recognizing Artsakh as part of Azerbaijan.

==== Recognition of Artsakh as Azerbaijani territorial integrity ====
On January 30, 2014, the Arizona Senate and the Arizona House of Representatives passed a resolution recognizing Artsakh as the territorial integrity of Azerbaijan.

On February 14, 2014, the New Mexico Senate adopted a resolution recognizing Artsakh as the Azerbaijani territorial integrity.

== See also ==
- Foreign relations of Artsakh
- Foreign relations of the United States
- Political status of Nagorno-Karabakh
- Armenia–United States relations
