= Ministry of Defence of Armenia =

Government ministry of Armenia

- Հայաստանի պաշտպանության նախարարություն Hayastani pashtpanut’yan nakhararut’yun
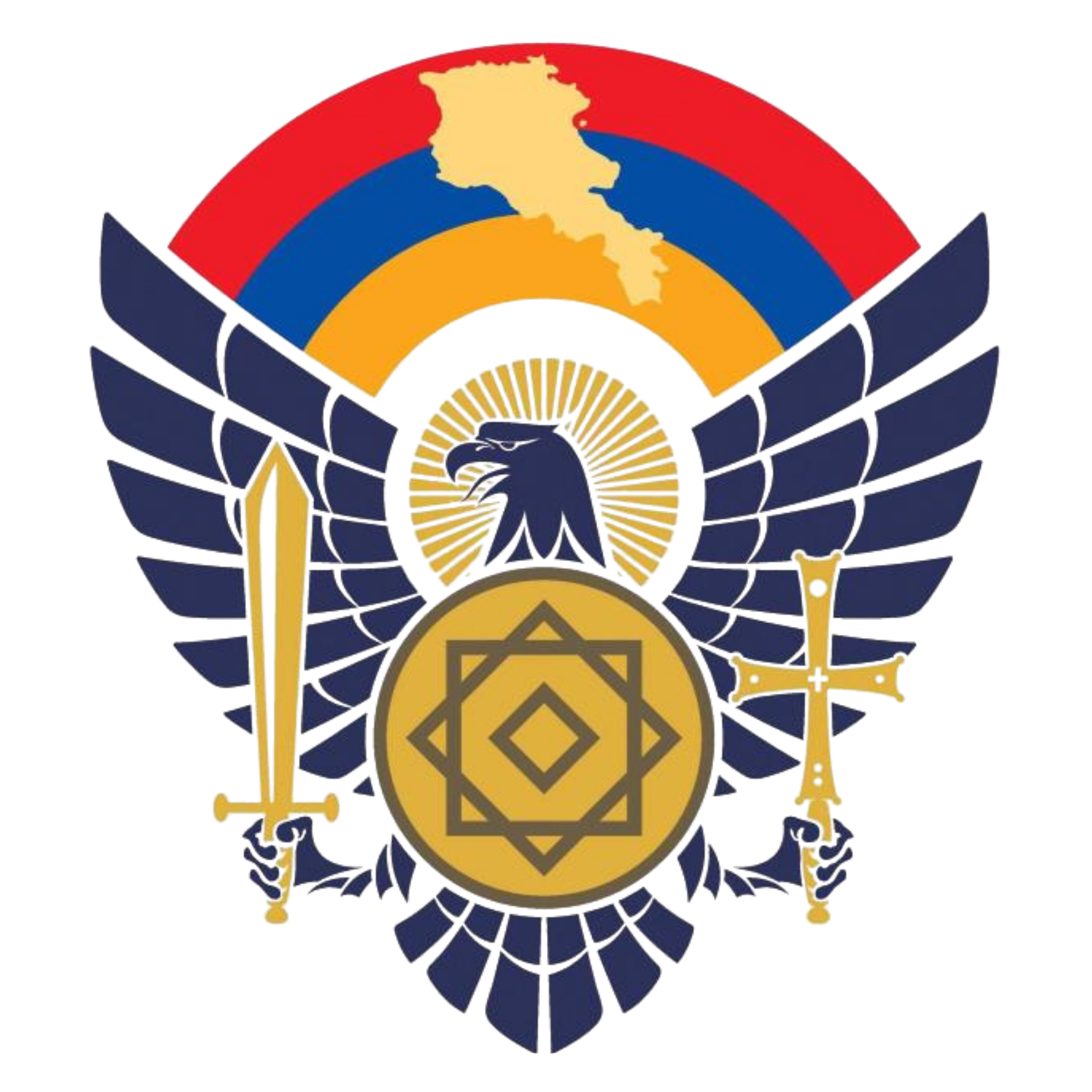
- Coat of Arms of the Ministry of Defense

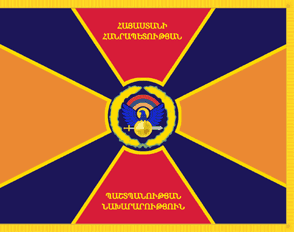
- Flag of the Ministry of Defense

Agency overview
- Formed: 28 January 1992; 34 years ago
- Jurisdiction: Government of Armenia
- Headquarters: 5 Bagrevand Street, 0044, Nor Nork District, Yerevan
- Minister responsible: Suren Papikyan, Minister of Defence
- Deputy Ministers responsible: Edvard Asryan, First Deputy Minister of Defence – Chief of the General Staff; Arman Sargsyan, Deputy Minister of Defence; Karen Brutyan, Deputy Minister of Defence; Hrachya Sargsyan, Deputy Minister of Defence
- Child agency: General Staff of the Armenian Armed Forces
- Website: mil.am/en

The Ministry of Defence of Armenia (Armenian: Հայաստանի պաշտպանության նախարարություն) often abbreviated to the RA Ministry of Defence is an Armenian governmental agency in charge of overseeing the development of the Armed Forces of Armenia. The Ministry of Defence is also the executive body which implements the policies of the Armenian Government in the defence sector. It particularly oversees the budget of the armed forces and ensures the safety of troops. It is located on 5 Bagrevand Street, Yerevan. The ministry was officially established on 28 January 1992 by decree of the President of Armenia.

== History ==
On 5 December 1991, by the decision of the Government of the Armenian SSR, the State Defence Committee under the Council of Ministers was created. The first head of this department was Vazgen Sargsyan. On 28 January 1992, the Government of Armenia adopted a resolution "On the Ministry of Defence of the Republic of Armenia", which was actually a renaming of the previously created State Defence Committee. Sargsyan was appointed the first Minister of Defence of Armenia. The police patrol and special operations regiment of the Ministry of Internal Affairs of Armenia, the civil defence regiment of the Civil Defence Headquarters of the Republic of Armenia and the republican military commissariat were transferred to the subordination of the newly formed ministry. The next step was the creation of the central apparatus of the Ministry of Defence, which included the Main Headquarters and management. In May 1992, the Ministry of Defence carried out the first conscription of military servicemen on the territory of the republic. The formation of the military department coincided with the beginning of large-scale operations in the First Nagorno-Karabakh War, in which the Armed Forces of Armenia actively participated. The Ministry of Defence was directly involved in the command of the Armenian forces in the territory of Nagorno-Karabakh and the formations of the Artsakh Defence Army. At the end of hostilities in early 1994, the military department of Armenia began the process of military reformation.

== Building ==
It is currently located at a building on 5 Bagrevand Street, Yerevan. In 1993, the building of the former hospital complex was handed over to the Ministry for the construction of a new building complex of the Ministry of Defence, but due to the lack of financial means, no construction was initiated. On the day of the 17th anniversary of Armenia's independence in 2008, the new building of the Ministry of Defence was officially opened. The main buildings of the complex, which covers an area of about 26 hectares, housed the Minister and his staff, the General Staff's Operative and Communication Department, rear services, a board hall for 380 people, a banquet hall, a canteen, fitness halls, and clinics. Auxiliary buildings include a swimming pool, boiler room, sports grounds and complex, checkpoints, barracks, centralized communication system, shooting range, a closed and spacious parking lot and a large helipad. The construction cost of the complex was 13 billion drams. The Russian "Ingeocom-Yerevan" company was recognized as the general contractor for the construction of the complex.

== Structure ==
=== Apparatus ===
- Collegium’s Work Organization Division
- Insignia Division
- Supervisory Department
- Administrative Division
- Analytical Division
- Secretariat Division

=== Departments subordinated to the Ministry ===
- Defence Policy Department
- Finance, Budget and Planning Department
- Capital Construction and Housing Department
- Internal Audit Department
- Information and Public Affairs Department
- HR and Education Department
- Legal Department
- Social Security Department
- Logistics Department

=== Services ===
- Conscription and Mobilization Service
- Central Military-Medical Committee
  - Central Clinical Military Hospital
  - Military Medical Training Centre
- Human Rights and Integrity Building Centre
- Council of the Union of Veterans of the Ministry of Defence
- Military Control Service of the Ministry of Defence

==== Central Clinical Military Hospital ====
It was created on March 15, 1994 in Yerevan. In May 2020, the surgical department, the neurosurgery department and the anesthesia department were named after Major Sergey Harutyunyan, Captain Karo Heboyan and Lieutenant Tigran Hovesyan, who were killed in a helicopter crash in early January 2000.

=== Other units and subordinate institutions ===
- Military Police
  - 12th Peacekeeping Brigade
- Special Forces Regiment
- Separate Regiment of Protection
  - Honour Guard Company
- BKMA Yerevan
- Army Chaplaincy Programme of the Armenian Church
- Song and Dance Ensemble

==== Military Police ====
The Military Police (Armenian: Ռազմական ոստիկանություն; Rrazmakan vostikanut’yun) fall under the command of the Ministry of Defence, being considered to be a division that is separate from the central apparatus. The Military Police was established in May 1992 and had no special status until 2007, when a law to define the Military Police status was adopted. Its status is defined in the RA Law on Military Police, which says that the Military Police is responsible for the investigation of military crimes in the armed forces that were committed on the territory of military units and the deterrence of crimes being planned or committed by military servicemen. The Military Police Bylaws were approved by the Government of Armenia on 25 December 2008.

The military police is in control of the peacekeeping brigade.

==== Separate Regiment of Protection ====
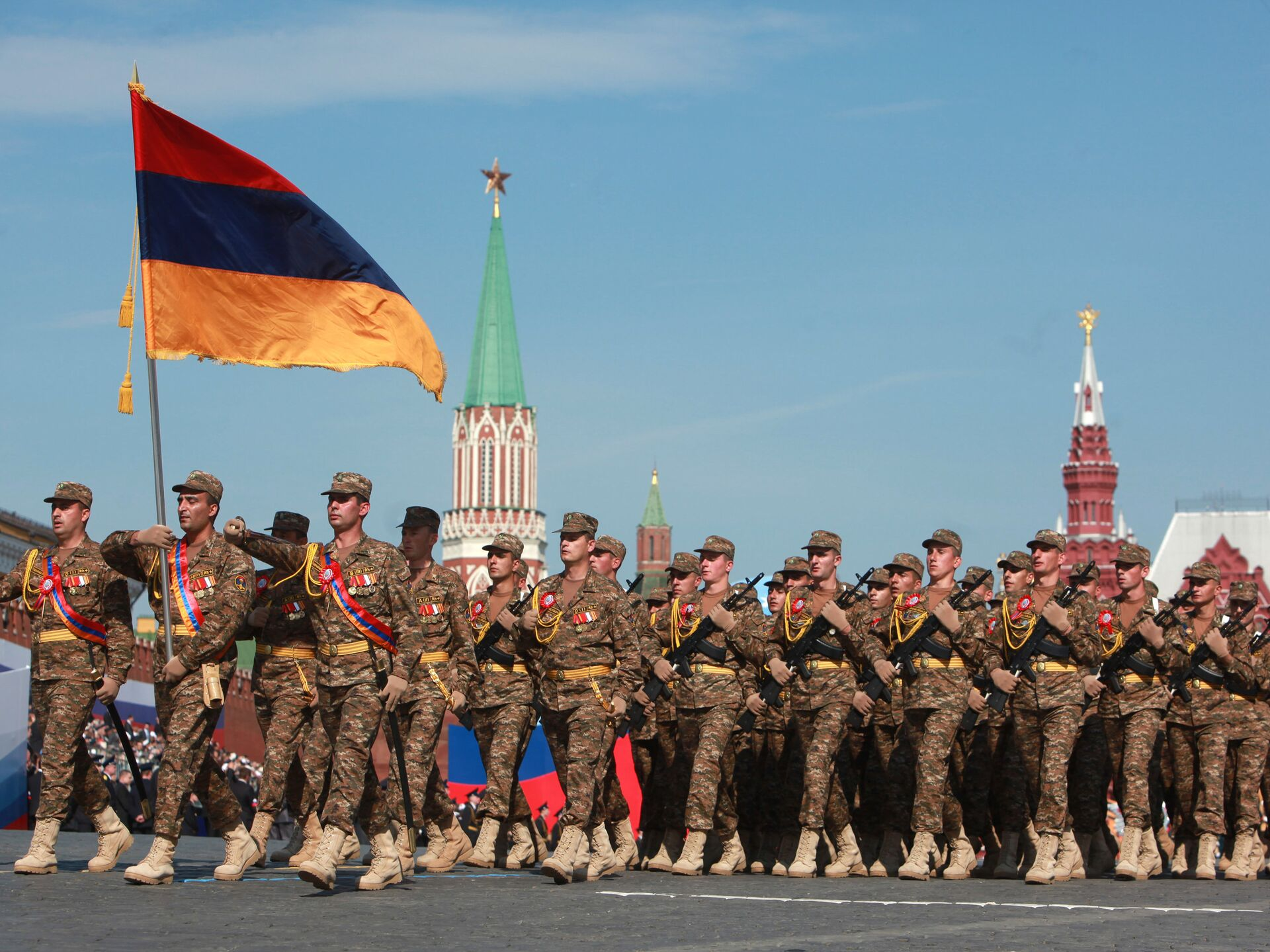
Members of the regiment during the 2010 Moscow Victory Day Parade.

The Separate Regiment of Protection is a security unit of the armed forces under the ministry. The Honour Guard Company falls under its command. it descends from the Yerevan Special Regiment, founded on 20 September 1990 with 26 platoons from Yerevan. In 2008, the regiment, as this point known as the Capital Regiment, handed over its territory to the Armenian Peacekeeping Brigade, moving to a different location. It has taken part in the 2010, 2015 and 2020 Moscow Victory Day Parades on Red Square. It is currently led by Colonel Ashot Hakobyan a graduate of the Moscow Higher Military Command School. The Armenian contingent at the 2010 parade was led by the grandson of Soviet Armenian Marshal Sergei Khudyakov, Lieutenant Colonel Vardan Khanferyants. The contingent's colour guard held the flag of the 89th Rifle Division in the latter two parades.

==== Chaplaincy Programme ====
The Army Chaplaincy Programme of the Armenian Apostolic Church (the national church of Armenia) is made up of more than 50 clergymen who currently serve as military chaplains to the Armed Forces. It is jointly funded and sponsored by the Ministry of Defence and the church.

==== Ensemble ====
The song and dance ensemble was formed in June 2010. The conscripts are admitted into the ensemble following an evaluation divided into these main parts:

- Classical dances
- Armenian folk dance
- Foreign folk dances
- Force movements
- Perception of rhythm

Razmik Marukyan, a ballet dancer and soloist at the Alexander Spendiaryan Opera and Ballet National Theatre, has been a part of the ensemble. As part of the International Army Games 2020, it performed at the Partnership Without Borders National Cultural Festival in Moscow.

== List of ministers ==
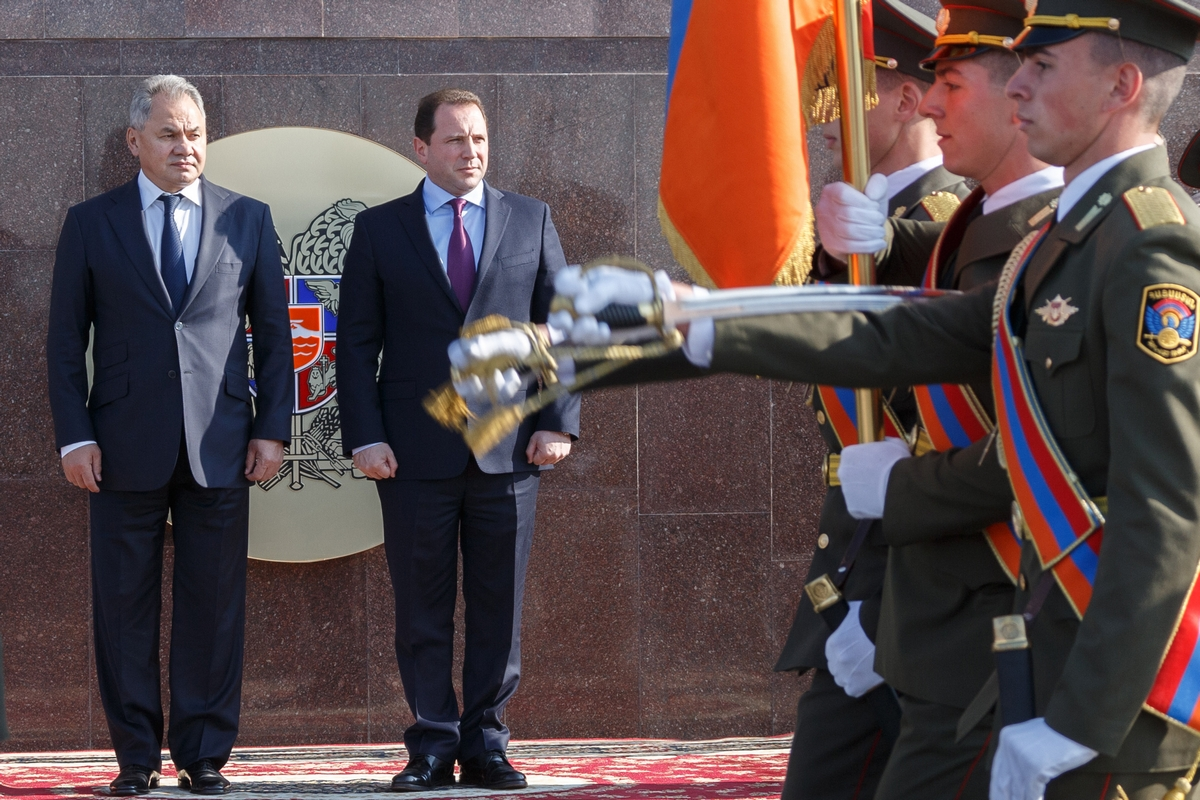
David Tonoyan with Sergey Shoygu at the defence ministry.

== See also ==
- Government of Armenia
- Ministry of Defence (Artsakh)
