= International reactions to the Second Nagorno-Karabakh War =

The following is list of the official reactions to the Second Nagorno-Karabakh War.

== OSCE Minsk Group ==
On 2 October 2020, the OSCE Minsk Group, responsible for mediating the peace process in the Nagorno-Karabakh conflict since 1992, condemned the fighting and called on those involved in the conflict to respect their obligations to protect civilians. The Minsk Group stated that participation by "external parties" was working against the peace process. The group called for an immediate ceasefire, and "substantive negotiations, in good faith and without preconditions".

== Supranational and regional organizations ==
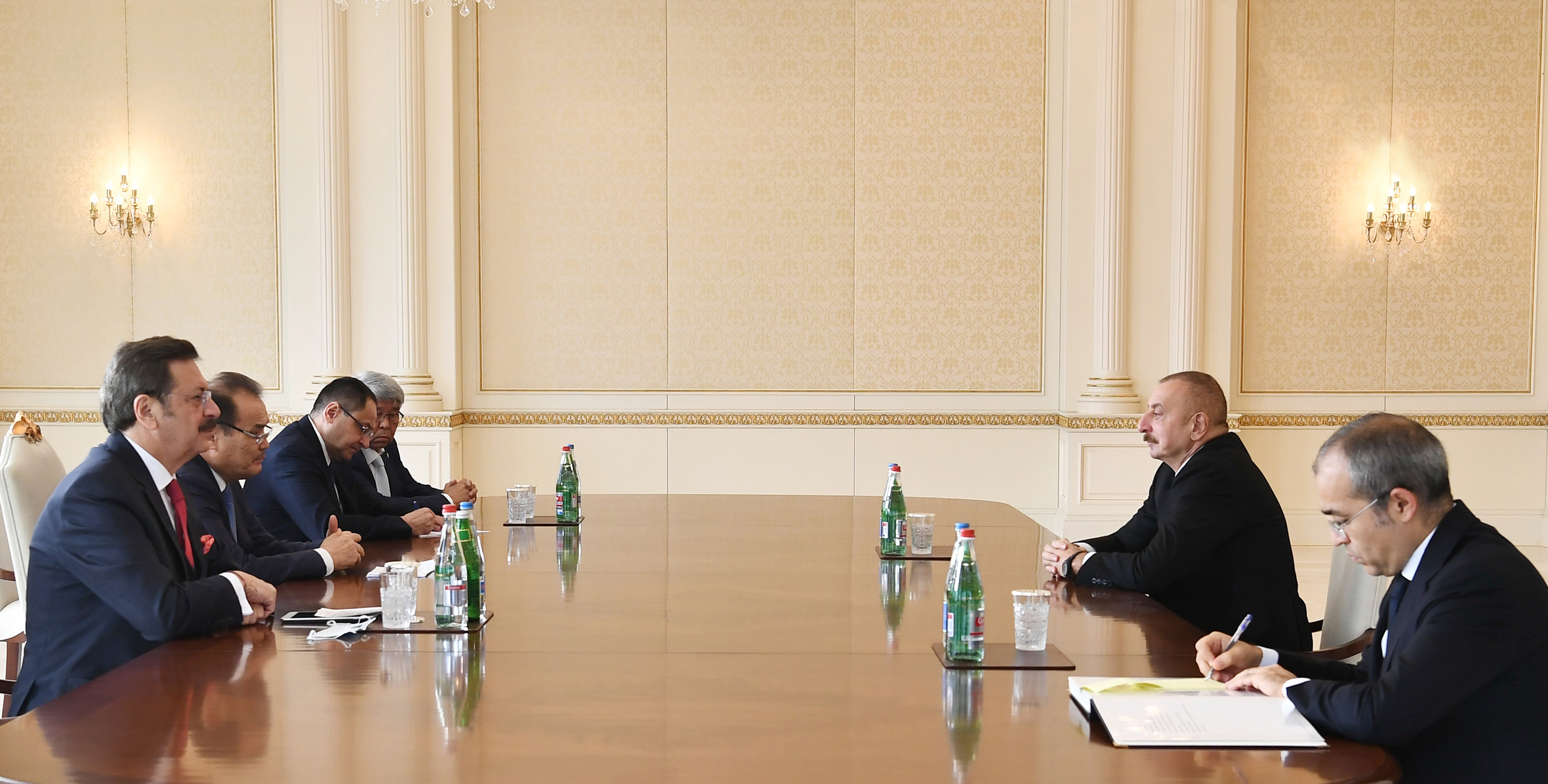
Secretary-General of the Turkic Council, Baghdad Amreyev, in Baku on 2 November 2020.

President of the European Council Charles Michel called for a bilateral cessation of hostilities, as did the Organization for Security and Co-operation in Europe (OSCE) on 1 October and 5 October 2020, and Secretary-General of the United Nations António Guterres followed by the United Nations Security Council (UNSC). Following a closed council meeting, the Security Council issued a statement. It condemned the use of force and reiterated the Secretary-General's call to immediately cease fighting, deescalate tensions and return to meaningful negotiations. It further expressed concern at "large scale military actions", regret at the death toll and impact on civilian populations, and complete support for the "central role" of the OSCE, urging both sides to cooperate towards an urgent return of dialogue without setting preconditions. On 18 October 2020, the UN Secretary-General again called on Armenia and Azerbaijan to respect the humanitarian truce and condemned attacks on civilians. Similarly, Secretary General of NATO, Jens Stoltenberg, expressed deep concern for the escalation of hostilities and called for the sides to immediately halt fighting and progress towards a peaceful resolution, urging NATO-member Turkey to use its influence to that end. Stoltenberg expressed NATO's neutrality and said that both "Armenia and Azerbaijan have been valued NATO partners for more than 25 years". NATO and the European Union (EU) have refused to publicly criticize Turkey's involvement in the conflict.

Secretary General of the Organization of American States Luis Almagro demanded that Azerbaijan cease hostilities, whereas the Turkic Council demanded an unconditional withdrawal of Armenia from the occupied territories of Azerbaijan, and adding that Turkic world have stood by "brotherly Azerbaijan". The Organisation of Islamic Cooperation initially condemned Armenian "provocations" and subsequently expressed concern regarding Armenia's violations of the 10 October 2020 humanitarian ceasefire and conditional solidarity with the Republic of Azerbaijan, highlighting the OIC stance and that of the UNSC and urging a political solution to the conflict, and affirming respect for Azerbaijan's sovereignty, territorial integrity, and internationally recognized borders.

On 19 October 2020, at the request of Russia, the United States, and France, the United Nations Security Council held closed consultations on the situation in Nagorno-Karabakh. After discussions, a draft declaration was prepared on behalf of the President of the Security Council. The draft declaration did not contain a reference to the previous UN Security Council resolutions regarding the topic. According to Hikmat Hajiyev, this project was mainly prepared by Russia and France. However, non-permanent members of the Security Council, who are the members of the Non-Aligned Movement at the same time, twice violated the silence procedure, insisting on the inclusion in the statement of a reference to the UN Security Council resolutions. Following the persistent and principled position of the member states of the Non-Aligned Movement, the draft statement in question was formally withdrawn. President of Azerbaijan Ilham Aliyev, who is also the Chairman of Non-Aligned Movement thanked those states including Indonesia, Niger, Tunisia, Vietnam, South Africa, Saint Vincent and the Grenadines, and the Dominican Republic for their fair position, announcing that he will continue to defend the interests of the member states, international law, and justice in the UN and other international organizations.

In its concluding observations on its periodic review of Azerbaijan, the United Nations Committee on the Elimination of Racial Discrimination expressed deep concern regarding "severe and grave human rights violations committed during 2020 hostilities and beyond by the Azerbaijani military forces against prisoners of war and other protected persons of Armenian ethnic or national origin, including extrajudicial killings, torture and other ill-treatment and arbitrary detention as well as the destruction of houses, schools, and other civilian facilities."

== Countries ==
=== The Russian Federation ===
Being a co-chair of OSCE Minsk Group, Russia's key role in this conflict is that of an active mediator. On 2 October 2020, along with the other two co-chairs of the Group, France and the U.S., it called for immediate cessation of hostilities in Nagorno-Karabakh, and asked both sides to continue negotiations without preconditions. On 6 October 2020, the Russian Foreign Minister Sergei Lavrov and his Iranian counterpart Mohammad Javad Zarif expressed concern about the involvement of Syrian and Libyan fighters in the Nagorno-Karabakh conflict, with the possible support of Turkey. Both Russia and Armenia are part of a mutual defence pact. However, on 8 October 2020, President Vladimir Putin explained that since the fighting is not happening on the territory of Armenia therefore Russia would not ibe in a position to intervene in the current conflict. He also affirmed Russia's good relations with both Armenia and Azerbaijan. On 9 October 2020, Lavrov mediated a ceasefire after 10 hours of talks between Armenian and Azerbaijani Foreign Ministers in Moscow. The ceasefire was quickly broken. On 22 October 2020, Putin indicated that the root cause of the conflict lies in interethnic clashes between Armenians and Azerbaijanis in the 1980s, and specifically referred to the pogrom of Armenians in Sumgait.

=== Turkey ===
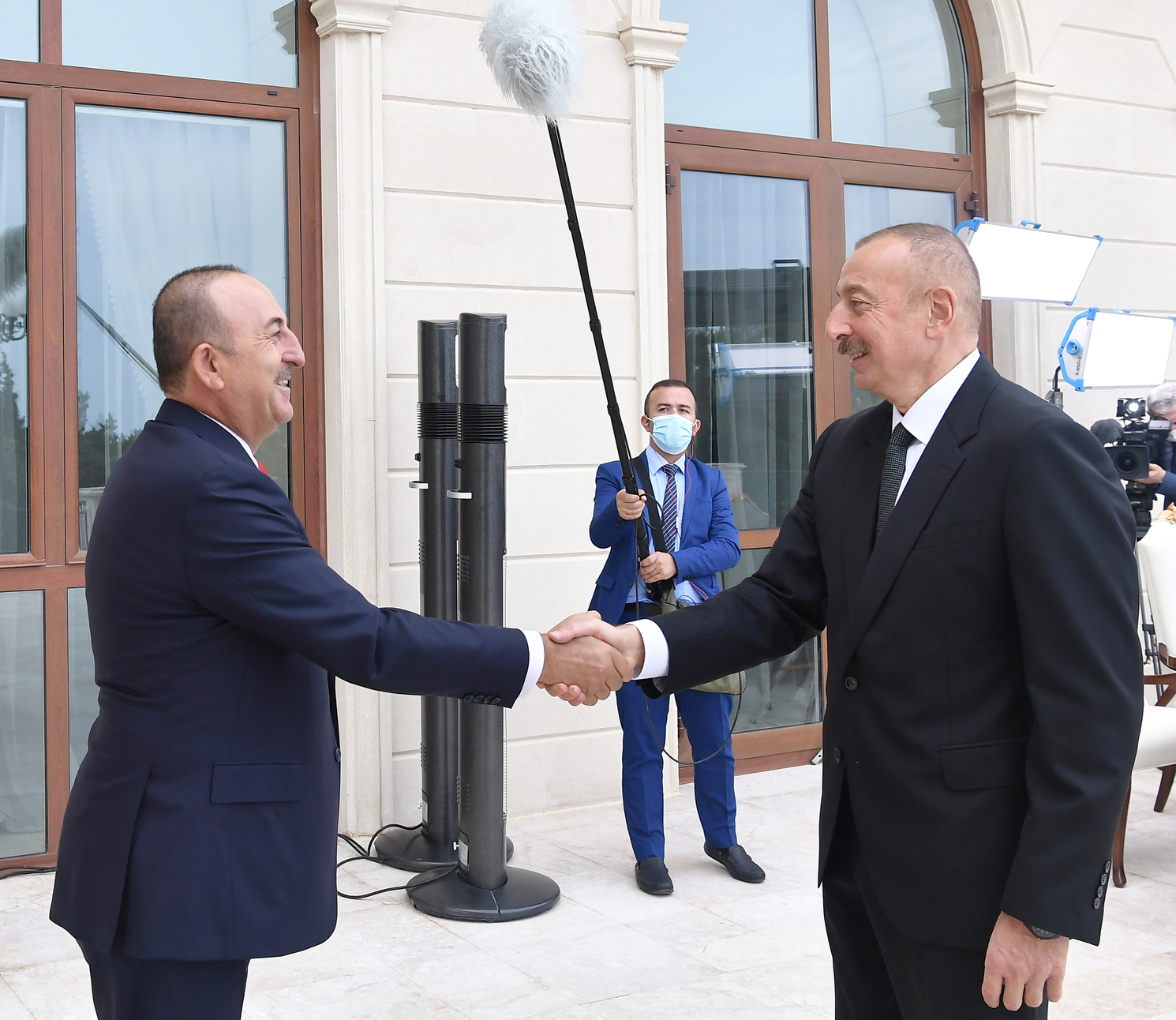
Azerbaijani President Ilham Aliyev and the Turkish Foreign Minister Mevlüt Çavuşoğlu on 6 October 2020.

The government of Turkey expressed support for Azerbaijan. Turkey blamed Armenia for violating the ceasefire and Turkish President Recep Tayyip Erdoğan initially urged Azerbaijan to persist with its campaign until it had retaken all territory lost in the First Nagorno-Karabakh War. Erdogan criticized the failed activities of the OSCE Minsk Group in the last 25 years as "stalling tactics" preventing a diplomatic solution. Further, Turkey issued a statement on 1 October 2020 dismissing the joint demands from France, Russia, and the United States calling for a ceasefire. Northern Cyprus, a self-declared state recognized only by Turkey, expressed support for Azerbaijan.

Turkey accused Canada of a "double standard" in freezing military exports to Turkey but not Saudi Arabia, which is involved in military intervention in Yemen.

=== United States ===
On 27 September 2020, United States president Donald Trump said his administration was "looking at [the conflict] very strongly" and that it was seeing whether it could stop it. Presidential candidate and former Vice President Joe Biden demanded that Turkey "stay out" of the Nagorno-Karabakh conflict. In a letter to U.S. Secretary of State Mike Pompeo, Senate Foreign Relations Committee ranking member Bob Menendez, Senate Minority Leader Chuck Schumer, and several other lawmakers called for the Trump administration to immediately suspend U.S. military aid to Azerbaijan, sent through Pentagon's "building partner assistance program". Eliot Engel, chairman of the House Foreign Affairs Committee, called the influence of third party actors like Turkey "troubling". On 15 October 2020, Pompeo urged both sides to respect the humanitarian ceasefire and stated, "We now have the Turks, who have stepped in and provided resources to Azerbaijan, increasing the risk, increasing the firepower that's taking place in this historic fight... The resolution of that conflict ought to be done through negotiation and peaceful discussions, not through armed conflict, and certainly not with third party countries coming in to lend their firepower to what is already a powder keg of a situation". A number of U.S. congressmen were more vocal in their criticism of the Azerbaijani side. On 22 October 2020, Representative Frank Pallone said he would introduce a bipartisan resolution with the backing of several dozen colleagues that "support[s] the Republic of Artsakh, recognizing its right to self-determination, and condemning Azerbaijan and Turkey for aggression". At least one congressman, Brad Sherman, called for the imposition of sanctions against Azerbaijan through the Magnitsky Act.

On 23 October 2020, President Trump stated that "good progress" was being made on reaching an agreement in the conflict, saying: "We are talking about this; we are talking with Armenia. We have very good relations with Armenia. They're great people and we're going to help them". On 25 October 2020, U.S. National Security Advisor Robert C. O'Brien announced that Armenia has accepted a ceasefire, Azerbaijan has not yet but they are "pushing them to do so". Later that day it was announced that both sides had agreed with a humanitarian ceasefire from the next day morning.

The Armenian ambassador to the United States, Varuzhan Nersesyan, had invited United States intervention in the conflict, as had his Azerbaijani counterpart Elin Suleymanov.

=== Others ===
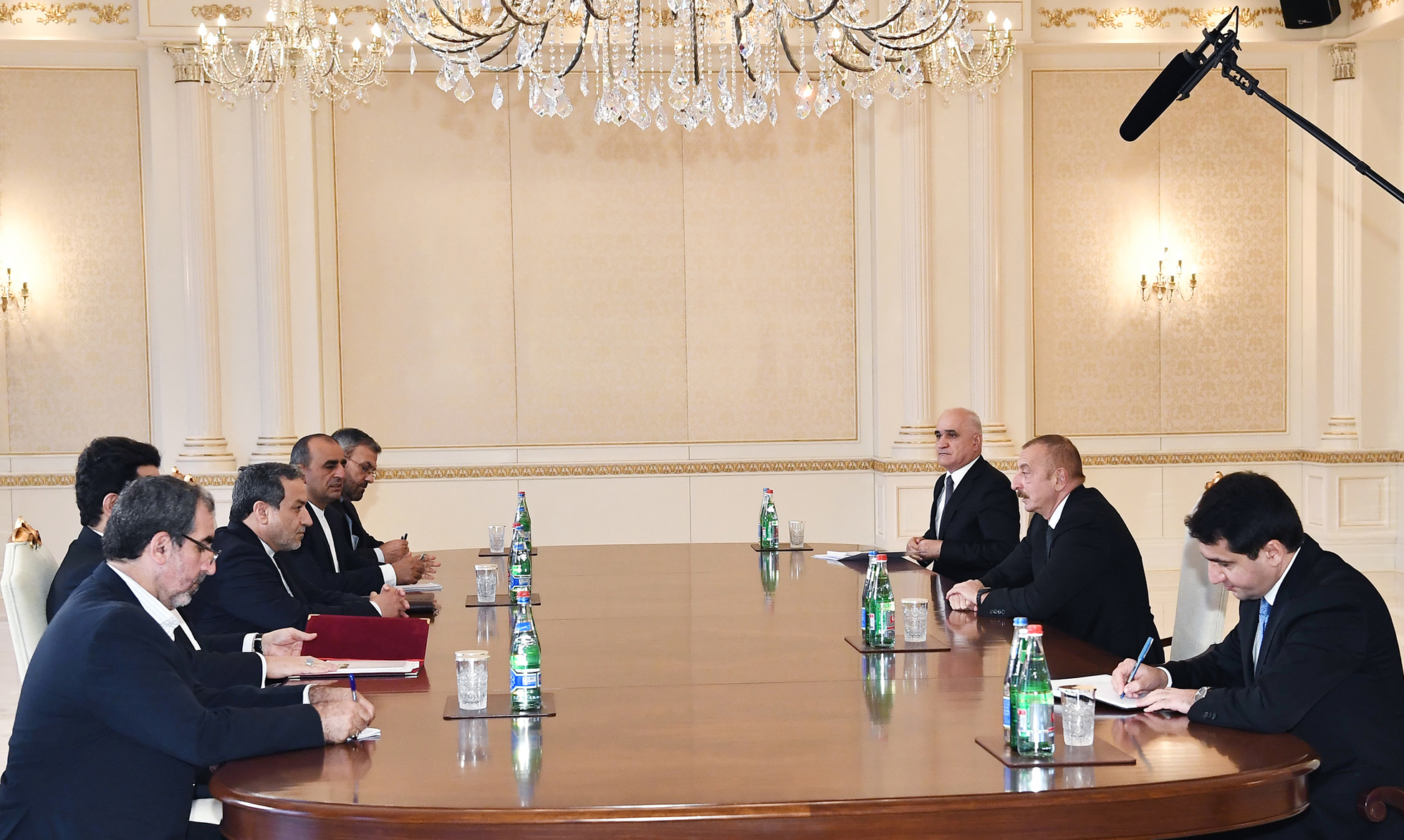
Iranian Presidential Envoy led by Abbas Araghchi in Baku on 28 October 2020.

Syrian President Bashar al-Assad blamed Turkey for the conflict, while Greek foreign minister Nikos Dendias, on a visit to Yerevan on 16 October 2020, said that it was critical to end foreign interference, warning that Turkey's intervention was raising serious international concerns.

Israeli President Reuven Rivlin expressed sorrow at the resumption of violence and loss of life, stating that Israel's long-standing cooperation and relations with Azerbaijan was not for offensive purposes, adding that Israel was interested in promoting relations with Armenia and was prepared to offer humanitarian aid. However, Nikol Pashinyan heavily criticized Israel for selling arms to Azerbaijan and its allies saying that they are working with "mercenaries and terrorists", who are targeting a peaceful population. Armenia recalled its ambassador to Israel for consultations. Prime Minister Nikol Pashinyan also rejected the humanitarian aid proposed by Israel and stated that the country should send that aid to the "terrorists". Israeli Defence Minister Benny Gantz accused Turkey of disrupting peace efforts in the region and called for international pressure on Turkey to dissuade "direct terrorism". Israel declined to comment on the possibility of halting support for Azerbaijan.

Hungary stated that it backed Azerbaijan's territorial integrity, adding it supports the reduction of tensions in the escalating conflict and a negotiated OSCE Minsk Group solution.

President of Ukraine Volodymyr Zelenskyy stated that Ukraine supports Azerbaijan's territorial integrity, would not provide military assistance to either state, and wanted to avoid an ethnic conflict between its own Armenian and Azerbaijani communities.

Pakistan supported Azerbaijan's position, stating that peace between both parties depended on the implementation of UN Security Council resolutions concerning the conflict and a withdrawal of Armenian forces from Azerbaijani-claimed territories.

Iran stated that no military solution to the conflict existed and expressed support for Azerbaijan's territorial integrity, emphasizing the need for a ceasefire and political dialogue and expressing concern over the conflict. While the supreme leader Ali Khamenei told that Azerbaijan is "entitled to liberate its occupied territories", and that the security of Armenian minority should be ensured. Albania stated that it supports territorial integrity of Azerbaijan and called both sides to solve conflict with peaceful negotiations.

Representatives of countries, including Argentina, Canada, Chile, China, Croatia, Estonia, France, Georgia, Germany, Greece, India, Indonesia, Iran, Kazakhstan, Latvia, Lithuania, Moldova, Poland, Romania, Russia, Saudi Arabia, the United Kingdom, the United States, Uruguay, and the Holy See, have called for a peaceful resolution to the conflict. Afghanistan called for an end to Armenian occupation in Nagorno-Karabakh while calling for a cease-fire, urging the parties involved to resolve the long-standing crisis peacefully. Bosniak member of the Presidency of Bosnia and Herzegovina Šefik Džaferović and the leader of the Party of Democratic Action, Bakir Izetbegović, voiced support for Azerbaijan, condemning Armenia and comparing the situation with the 1992–1995 Bosnian War. Cyprus condemned Azerbaijan for breaching the ceasefire and for any escalating actions, calling for a return to peaceful negotiations. After the war, in January 2021, the Ambassador of the United Kingdom to Azerbaijan James L. Sharp, congratulated the Azerbaijani people on their country's victory in the war.

The unrecognized or partially recognized countries of Transnistria, Abkhazia and South Ossetia recognize the independence of the Republic of Artsakh and have expressed support for it.

The Russian-Armenian film director Sarik Andreasyan accused Ukraine by addressing the President of Ukraine Volodymyr Zelenskyy in supplying Azerbaijan with phosphorus bombs. Zelenskyy answered his post in Instagram by denying any involvement in the conflict.

Hamas congratulated Azerbaijan for "regaining territory from the occupation".

== Humanitarian organizations ==
Human rights groups have objected to the use of heavy explosive weapons with wide-area effects in densely populated civilian areas and urged both sides to end the conflict and join the Convention on Cluster Munitions. Amnesty International and Human Rights Watch have criticized both Azerbaijan and Armenia for the use of cluster munitions.

Genocide Watch stated that both sides in the conflict had committed war crimes but that "Azerbaijan's invasion of Artsakh in September 2020 cannot be justified by any UN Resolution because UN Resolutions are subordinate to the national right to self-determination under UN Charter Article I and under the International Covenant on Civil and Political Rights, which enshrine the right of self-determination of peoples and nations. Azerbaijan no longer has a legitimate right to reassert Soviet borders by invading Artsakh." Both the International Association of Genocide Scholars and Genocide Watch criticized Turkish President Erdogan and Azeri President Aliyev for framing indigenous Armenians as "occupiers" of Artsakh.

== Proposed sanctions ==
On 10 November 2020, after the reached ceasefire agreement, French Foreign Minister Jean-Yves Le Drian stated that Turkey must accept the terms of the ceasefire concluded by the parties to the Nagorno-Karabakh conflict, otherwise the European Union may impose additional sanctions against the country. On 18 November 2020, the Dutch Parliament adopted a motion calling the government to impose individual sanctions against Azerbaijani President Ilham Aliyev, his relatives, key figures of the Azerbaijani offensive and Syrian militants deployed by Turkey in Nagorno-Karabakh. The deputies approved another resolution, which says that the latest outbreak of violence in Nagorno-Karabakh was initiated by Azerbaijan with the support of Turkey. On 19 November 2020, the U.S. New Jersey Senator Bob Menendez demanded United States sanctions on Turkey and Azerbaijan for aggression against Armenia and Artsakh.

== Minorities abroad ==
=== Armenians ===
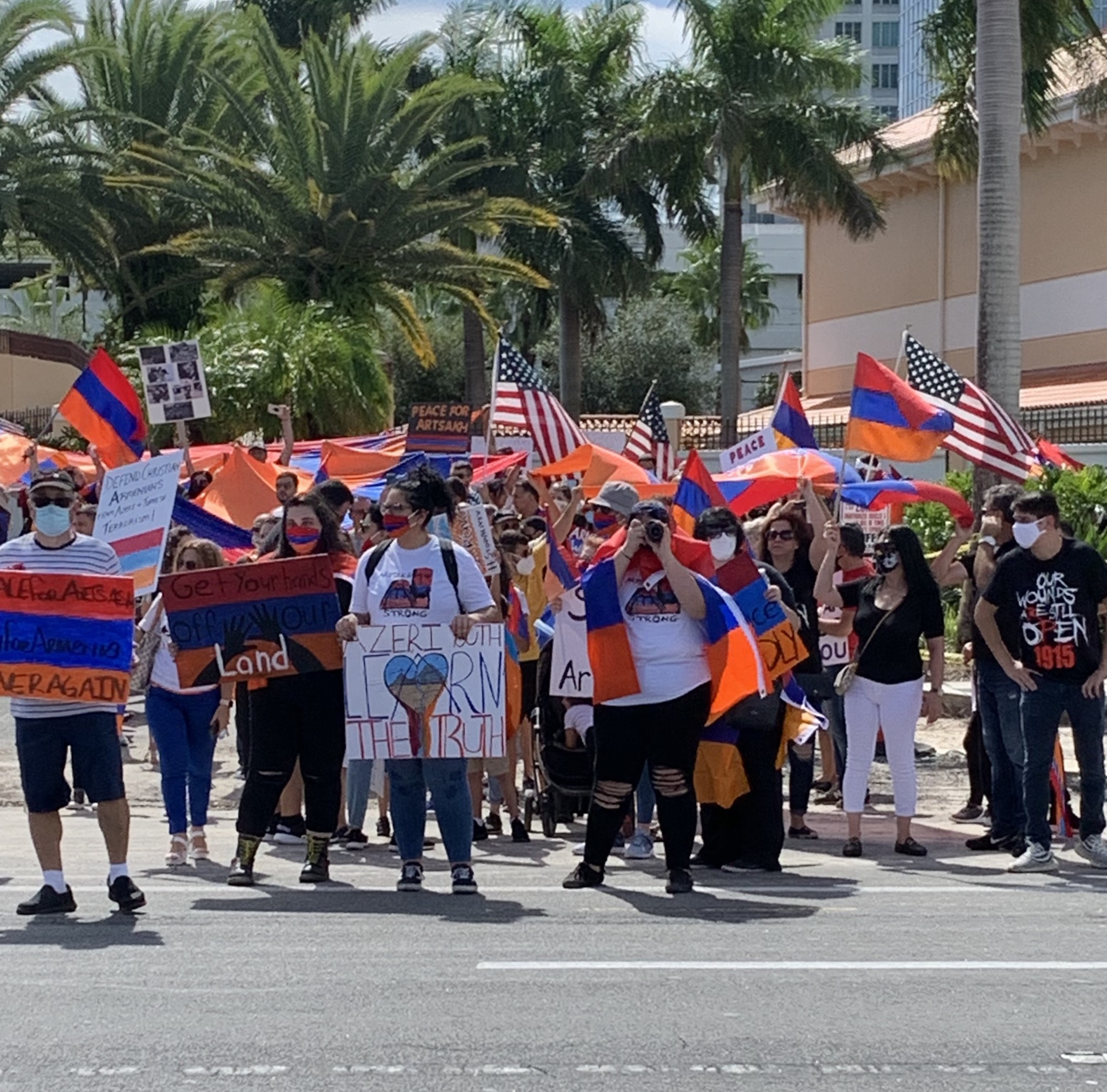
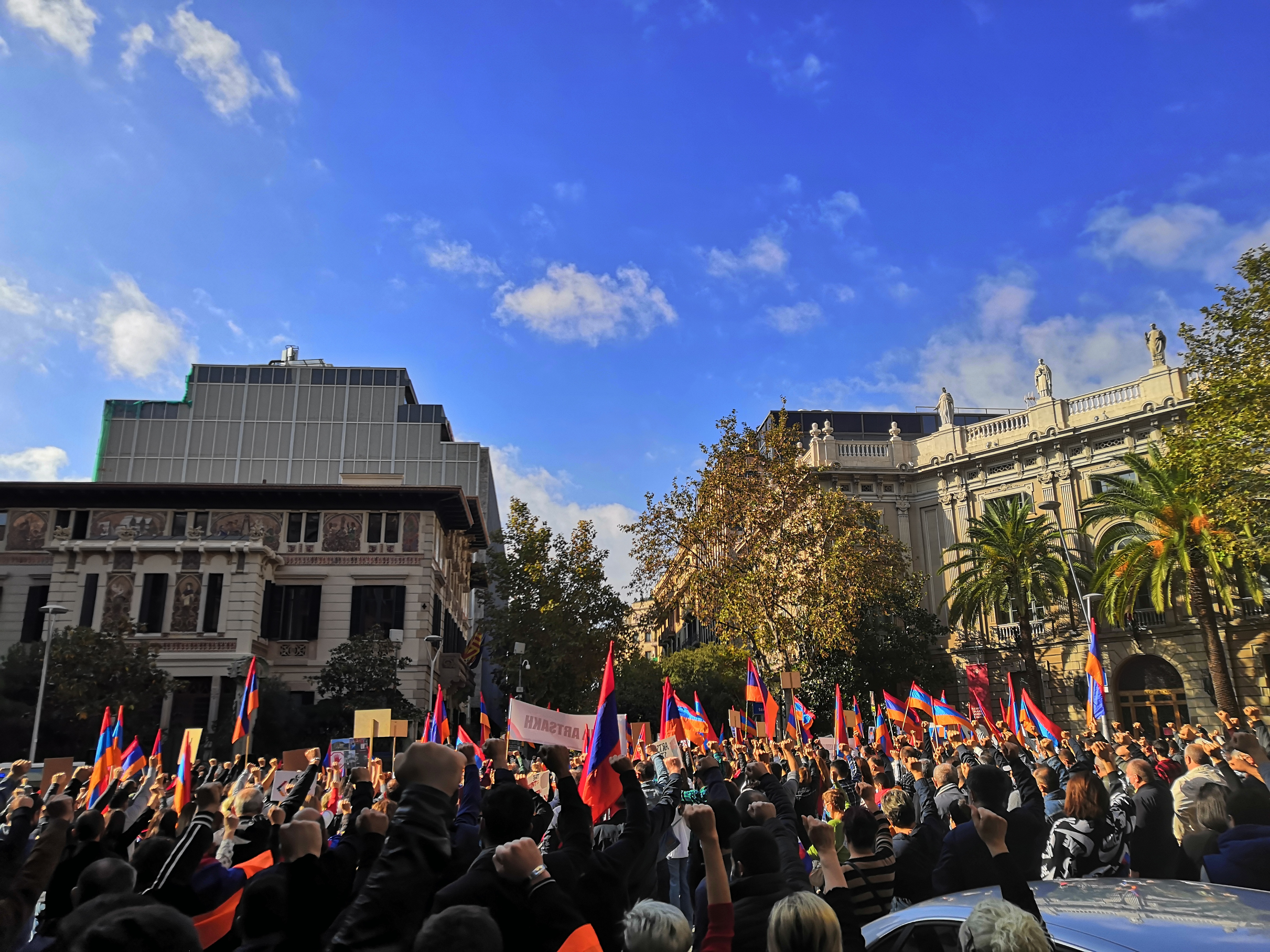
Armenian diaspora held numerous protests globally in support of Armenia and Artsakh (pictured in Los Angeles (left) and Barcelona (right)).

Ethnic Armenian populations around the world have lobbied for peace negotiations. On 1 October, the South Ossetian Armenian community condemned Azerbaijan and Turkey, urging recognition of Artsakh's independence. The next day, Armenians in Samtskhe–Javakheti, in Georgia, expressed concern and their intention to send aid. Subsequently, Georgia closed its border with Armenia, indicating frustration within Georgia's Armenian minority. Croatia's Armenian diaspora's leader asked for support against what she described as a genocide against the Armenians. On 5 October, Armenian Americans protested outside the Los Angeles (LA) CNN building, calling for more accurate coverage. On 11 October, the LA community held a 100,000-person strong protest march to the Turkish Consulate, in tandem with smaller protests in Washington, San Francisco, New York City, Boston and elsewhere in the United States. LA's mayor expressed support for Armenia and the city's Armenian community by lighting up City Hall with the Armenian flag's colours. A protest was held in Orange Country during President Trump's pre-election rally calling on him to sanction Turkey and Azerbaijan; Trump praised them by saying, "the people from Armenia have great spirit for their country". Protests have occurred all over Europe demanding recognition of Artsakh's independence, with the largest rallies held in Paris, France, and in front the Council of the European Union in Brussels, Belgium. A major rally was held in Aleppo, Syria by Armenians and Syrians condemning Azerbaijan and Turkey. Armenian communities have also protested globally, notably in Argentina, Australia, Canada, and Uruguay.

In October 2020, an organized email campaign by the Armenians resulted in hundreds of emails being sent to SpaceX and the media requesting that SpaceX cancel their upcoming satellite launch for Turkey. SpaceX did not respond. On October 29, 2020, several hundred Armenians gathered outside SpaceX headquarters in Los Angeles to protest the launch of the Turkish satellite and to persuade SpaceX from doing so. Protesters believe the satellite could be used for military purposes. SpaceX has still not responded and representatives refused to speak to the news.

On September 27, a nationwide fundraising campaign was launched by Armenia Fund under the motto "We and Our Borders: All for Artsakh"; getting more than $170 million donations. On October 28, an online musical event featuring Armenian and foreign artists was held to raise awareness and funds for Artsakh. After the end of hostilities, $100 million of the donations were redirected to the government. It was met with criticism by president Sarkissian and some of the donors, who demanded refund.

On 4 November, around 8:30 p.m. local time, reportedly a group of six to eight Armenian men between 20 and 30 years old walked into a Turkish restaurant on South Beverly Drive, saying that they came to "kill the Turks", began destroying property inside the establishment and physically attacking the employees both inside and in an alley outside. The victims sustained minor injuries and refused medical treatment at the scene. Beverly Hills Police Department began investigating the incident as a hate crime. Beverly Hills Mayor called it an "unacceptable act of hate and violence", adding that there was "no place for this behavior. Turkey's ambassador to US, strongly condemned the attack, calling Los Angeles Mayor to do the same, and urging federal and local authorities to protect Turkish Americans there.

On the night of 7 November, two unknown individuals fired upon the building of the Honorary Consulate of Azerbaijan in Kharkiv, Ukraine. No one was injured in the incident. Kharkiv police launched a criminal case on the same day. The Azerbaijani MoFA condemned the incident and accused the "radical Armenian forces" of being its perpetrators.

=== Azerbaijanis and Turks ===
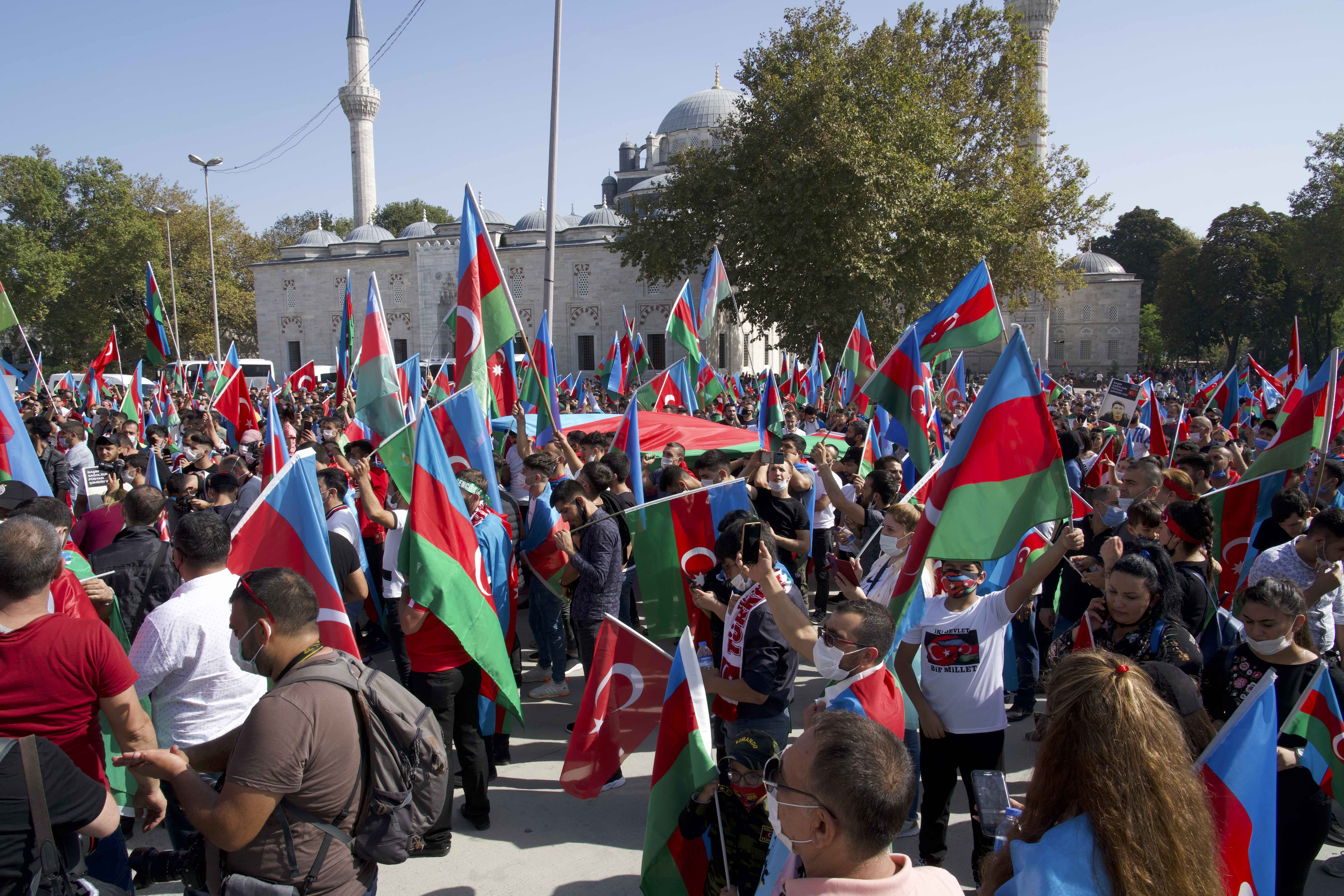
Turks and Azerbaijanis demonstrating in support of Azerbaijan in Turkey.

On 1 October, Ali Khamenei's representatives in four provinces (Ardabil, East Azerbaijan, West Azerbaijan and Zanjan) stated that Nagorno-Karabakh belonged to Azerbaijan, that there was a need to return the territory, and that Azerbaijan's government had acted in accordance with the law. The next day, several protests erupted in Iranian cities, including the capital Tehran and Tabriz, in support of Azerbaijan. Iranian Azerbaijani demonstrators chanted pro-Azerbaijan slogans. The local security forces intervened, detaining at least 38 people. The same day, around 50 Azerbaijani representatives from the 5,000-strong community in Moldova expressed their support for Azerbaijan in the capital Chișinău. On 3 October, Azerbaijanis in Georgia indicated a readiness to fight for Azerbaijan and the desire that Azerbaijan retake Nagorno-Karabakh. On 16 October, Azerbaijanis, Iranian Azerbaijanis, and Turks living in the United Kingdom gathered in front of Amnesty International's London headquarters and held a protest rally, condemning the shelling of residential areas and civilians in Ganja, Mingachevir, Tartar, and other regions. The next day, Azerbaijani Americans held a rally in Chicago, condemning the attacks on Ganja. The following day, British Azerbaijanis commemorated those killed during the attacks in front of the Azerbaijani embassy in London. while Georgian Azerbaijanis held a rally in front the Parliament Building in Tbilisi. On the same day, Russian Azerbaijanis dedicated part of the entrance door of Azerbaijan's embassy to Russia in Moscow to the memory of the victims of the 17 October attack. Protests erupted in Tabriz, with many Iranian Azerbaijanis chanting pro-Azerbaijani slogans and protesting Iran's alleged arms support to Armenia via the Nordooz border crossing. Iranian security forces intervened, detaining over 200 people. On 23 October, American Azerbaijanis gathered in a pro-Trump rally and voiced their support for Azerbaijan, while in San Francisco and Minnesota, Azerbaijanis rallied and condemned Armenia for "the ballistic missile attacks" on cities. On 26 October, Azerbaijanis organized rallies in Bielefeld, Germany, and Copenhagen, Denmark.

Amid tensions among protesters over Nagorno-Karabakh, dozens of Turks and Azerbaijanis marched through the streets of Lyon, France, in the evening of 28 October 2020 and chanted pro-Erdogan slogans while threatening Armenians. Independent Union of Police Commissioners of France also shared footage from a similar incident in Vienne, a town 35 kilometres south of Lyon, where Turks lead a punitive expedition in search of Armenians in the city, attacking the local police crew. These events followed the clashes between Turks and Armenians on A7 motorway the preceding morning, when the demonstration of support for Armenia led to the blocking of the motorway between Lyon and Marseille. Four people were wounded after violence broke out, including a 23-year-old Armenian who was hospitalized after receiving a hammer blow. A few days later, the Lyon Armenian Genocide Memorial was vandalized with pro-Turkey graffiti and insults, reportedly by the Grey Wolves, a Turkish ultranationalistic group. Following the memorial's vandalisation, France banned the Grey Wolves and enhanced security near Armenian schools and churches in Lyon.

== Sports ==
Due to the conflict, UEFA announced that the 2020–21 UEFA Nations League C home matches of Armenia and Azerbaijan would no longer be hosted in the countries; instead Armenia will play their designated "home" game in Tychy, Poland; while Azerbaijan will play in Elbasan, Albania.

On 31 October 2020, the Armenian Football Federation called on FIFA and UEFA for sanctions against Azerbaijani club Qarabağ FK, after its PR and media manager Nurlan Ibrahimov made a hate speech on social network calling to "kill all the Armenians, old and young, without distinction". The next day, he was punished in an administrative manner for the calls he made expressing cruelty against another nation and inciting national, racial or religious hatred while behaving emotionally on social network. UEFA announced that it has life banned the Qarabağ official for the "racist and other discriminatory conduct” targeting Armenians and fined Qarabağ €100,000. Shortly after the UEFA sanction, Ibrahimov was declared wanted in Armenia.

== Celebrities ==
Celebrities have commented on the conflict, with some amending their initial positions, including Cardi B and Elton John who subsequently claimed that they were not taking any sides. Those in favor of Armenia include Mel Gibson, Ronda Rousey, Henrikh Mkhitaryan, Peter Gabriel, Sean Penn, Michael B. Jordan, Kylie Jenner, Tinashe, Cher, Bill Belichick, Cam Newton, Tristan Thompson, Big Sean, Ne-Yo, among others. Charles Aznavour’s son and Chairman of Board of Trustees of Aznavour Foundation Nicolas Aznavour published an open letter addressed to Israel's president Reuven Rivlin, slamming Israel for selling prohibited arms used to kill Armenians Kim Kardashian and other Kardashians have posted video messages in support of Armenia; donating $1 million to the Armenia Fund. Rapper Kanye West posted a tweet stated he would pray for Armenia. Armenian-American rock band System of a Down released their first material in 15 years since 2005 album Hypnotize, "Protect the Land" and "Genocidal Humanoidz" in response to the crisis. They used the singles as a fundraiser for the Armenia Fund, with the intention to raise awareness of the war. Arsenal footballer Mesut Özil and singer Sami Yusuf tweeted in support of Azerbaijan. Former Barcelona player Ronaldinho and American actor Chuck Norris both released a video message in support of Azerbaijan. Several Turkish celebrities, including Sinan Akçıl, Hadise, Bergüzar Korel, Acun Ilıcalı, Kenan İmirzalıoğlu, Tarkan, Cem Yılmaz also shared their condolences and support to Azerbaijan.

== Recognition of Artsakh ==
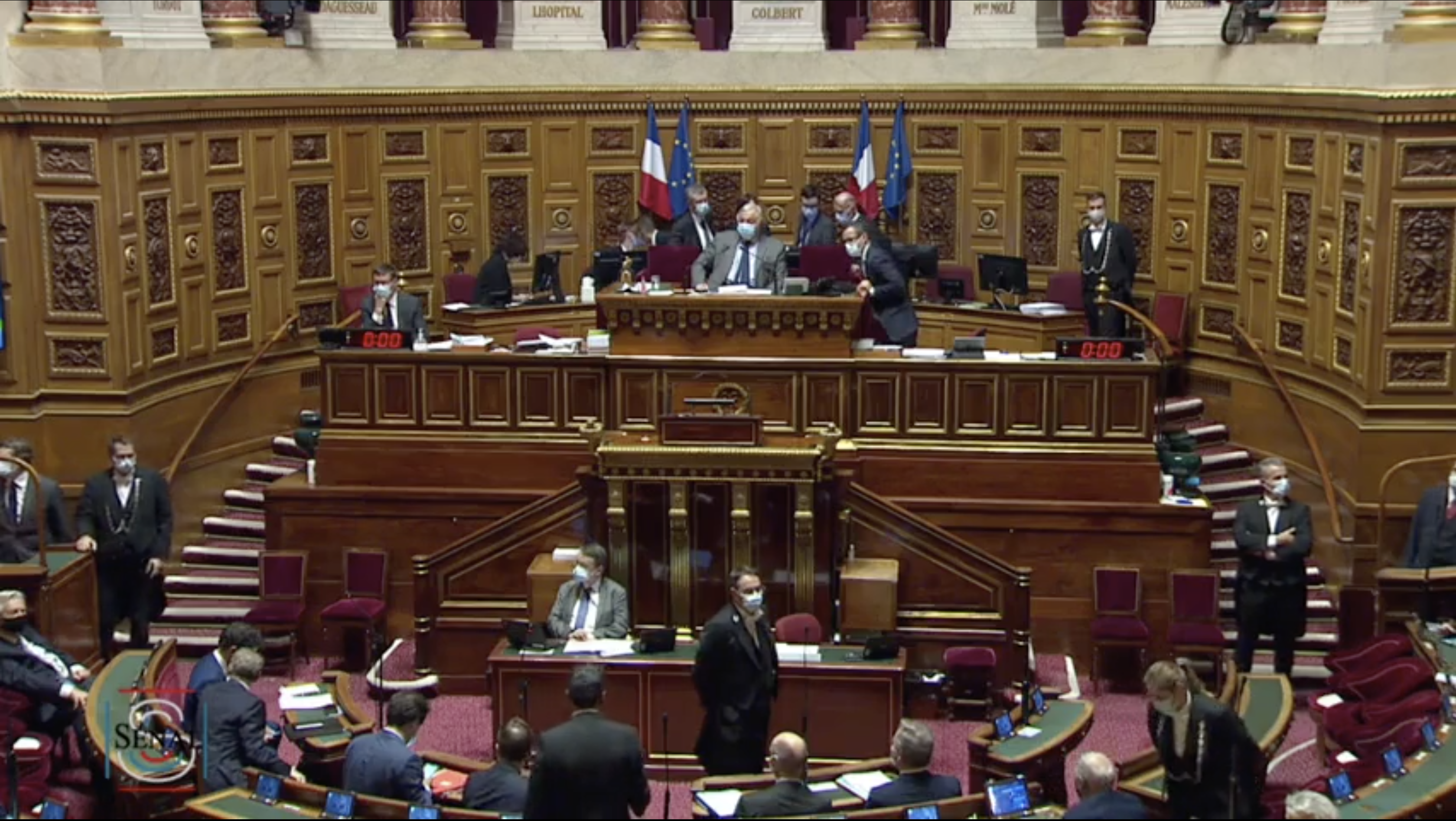
French Senate adopts resolution calling for recognition of the Republic of Artsakh. 25 November 2020

Due to the ongoing hostilities, the urgent motion on recognizing the independence of the Republic of Artsakh has been passed in different cities and towns. On 25 November the French Senate adopted resolution calling on the French government to recognize the independence of the Nagorno-Karabakh Republic. The resolution serves as a recommendation and has no mandatory power. French Secretary of State at the Minister for Europe and Foreign Affairs Jean-Baptiste Lemoyne stated that "unilateral recognition of Karabakh will do no good for anyone" and will not serve to boost mediation efforts. Armenian PM Nikol Pashinyan stated that the decision made by the French Senate was "historical." The Artsakh Foreign Ministry issued a statement expressing its gratitude, calling the French Senate vote “courageous,” expressing hope that it will serve as an example for other institutions, among the French National Assembly, and other countries to follow suit. The French Ambassador to Azerbaijan, Zacharie Gross, had stated that "unilateral recognition of the Nagorno-Karabakh Republic is not the policy of the French government". Azerbaijan's parliament condemned the resolution of the French Senate and called on the Azerbaijani government to appeal to the OSCE to remove France from the OSCE Minsk Group co-chairmanship. The parliament's chairman, Sahiba Gafarova, stated that the resolution had "distorted the essence of the conflict." Stressing that France is a co-chair of the OSCE Minsk Group, Gafarova added that "this country, which speaks of freedom and democracy, has never made a distinction between the occupier and the occupied, and has shown a biased position." The Azerbaijani Foreign Ministry also issued a note of protest to the French Ambassador. On 27 November, Turkey's Justice and Development Party (AKP), the Republican People's Party (CHP), the Nationalist Movement Party (MHP) and the İYİ Party issued a joint statement condemning the French Senate's resolution on Artsakh's recognition. However, two days later, the French Foreign Ministry issued a statement that it does not recognize "the self-proclaimed Nagorno-Karabakh Republic".

On 3 December 2020, the National Assembly of France also adopted a resolution urging the French Government to recognize Artsakh. Before the vote, French Foreign Minister Jean-Yves Le Drian spoke out against such recognition, saying that it would be counterproductive for both France and the Karabakh peace process. Artsakh MFA commented that the recognition will "guarantee the rights of the citizens of Artsakh to live freely in their native land" and that the political settlement of the conflict should be based on the right to self-determination. The next day, Azerbaijan sent a note of protest to the French Ambassador. Also, the Azerbaijani Foreign Ministry responded to the decision by calling it "another completely baseless, unfriendly and provocative activity" by the French parliament, adding that this "biased" resolution was part of a "sustained campaign" against Azerbaijan. The ministry, citing the resolution's title, also accused members of the French National Assembly of "adding religious overtones" to the conflict, and stressed that the resolution had no legal force.

Some international analysts called on France to step down from its position as a co-chair of the Minsk Group due to its support for Armenia, as its status as mediator requires that it maintains neutrality.

On 22 November 2020 President of Russia Vladimir Putin said that from the point of view of the international law Nagorno-Karabakh is a part of Azerbaijan. Vladimir Putin's Press Secretary Dmitry Peskov stated that Russia, the same as other countries, did not change its position on the status of Nagorno-Karabakh, and the ownership of this territory is determined by the resolutions of the UN Security Council. According to Peskov, there was "no one in charge" in Karabakh, and Russia coordinates its activities in the region with two parties to the conflict, Azerbaijan and Armenia. President Vladimir Putin reiterated his stance at the annual press conference on December 17, stating that international law recognizes Nagorno-Karabakh as part of Azerbaijan, and that Russia always held the position that seven occupied districts around Nagorno-Karabakh should be returned to Azerbaijan.

== See also ==
- 2014 Armenian–Azerbaijani clashes
- List of ongoing armed conflicts
- List of territorial disputes
