= Agshin Mehdiyev =

Azerbaijani diplomat (born 1949)

Head of the Permanent Observer Mission of the Organization of Islamic Cooperation to the United Nations
- Incumbent
- Assumed office June 2016
- Preceded by: Ufuk Gokcen

Head of the Permanent Observer Mission of the Organization of Islamic Cooperation to the European Union
- In office 1 December 2015 – June 2016
- Preceded by: Arif Mammadov
- Succeeded by: Ismat Jahan

Permanent Representative of Azerbaijan to the United Nations
- In office 30 November 2006 – April 2014
- President: Ilham Aliyev
- Preceded by: Yashar Aliyev
- Succeeded by: Yaşar Aliyev

Personal details
- Born: 28 April 1949 (age 77) Baku, Azerbaijan SSR

Agshin Shafaat oglu Mehdiyev (Azerbaijani: Aqşin Şəfaət oğlu Mehdiyev; born 28 April 1949) is an Azerbaijani diplomat who has served as Ambassador-at-Large of the Ministry of Foreign Affairs of the Republic of Azerbaijan since May 2014. Agshin Mehdiyev speaks Azerbaijani, Arabic, English, Russian and Turkish.

== Early life and education ==
Agshin Mehdiyev was born in Baku, Azerbaijan on April 28, 1949. He graduated from Azerbaijan State University (Faculty of Oriental Studies) in 1971. Between 1969 and 1970, he studied at Cairo University. Later, from 1985 to 1987, he attended the Diplomatic Academy of the Ministry of Foreign Affairs of the USSR in Moscow, where he obtained his Ph.D. degree in history of international relations. Mehdiyev is Honorary Professor of Baku Eurasian University since 2007.

== Political career ==
Dr. Mehdiyev is a career diplomat and joined the diplomatic service in 1975. From 1971 to 1975 he worked at the Embassy of the Union of Soviet Socialist Republics (USSR) in the Arab Republic of Egypt as an assistant to the counselor for economic affairs. In the course of his career, he served as Chief of Information and Media Office of the Ministry of Foreign Affairs of Azerbaijan SSR (1975–1977).

He worked, among other things, at the different positions at the Embassy of the USSR in the Yemen Arab Republic (1977–1982) and also held various posts in the Ministry of Foreign Affairs of Azerbaijan SSR (1982–1985).

Dr. Mehdiyev also worked as Council-General at the Embassy of the USSR in the People's Democratic Republic of Yemen between 1987 and 1991 and received a certificate of honor from the Ministry of Foreign Affairs of USSR for personal brave and high professionalism during the release of Soviet sailors captured by pirates in the Gulf of Aden. In 1991, he worked as Counselor, Director of Foreign Policy Department at the Embassy of the USSR in the Republic of Yemen. Following the independence of Azerbaijan, he was appointed as the first Permanent Representative of the Republic of Azerbaijan in the Republic of Yemen for the term 1991–1992.

From 1993 to 2001, he was the Head of the Europe, USA and Canada Department of the Ministry of Foreign Affairs of the Republic of Azerbaijan. He was also the first Permanent Representative of the Republic of Azerbaijan to the Council of Europe (2001–2006). During his term, the Council of Europe adopted a number of resolutions and documents related to the aggression of Armenia against the Republic of Azerbaijan.

Agshin Mehdiyev served as Permanent Representative of the Republic of Azerbaijan to the United Nations from November 2006 to April 2014. During his term, the United Nations General Assembly adopted a resolution on "Situation in the occupied territories of Azerbaijan" and a number of other resolutions initiated by Azerbaijan. Concurrently, Azerbaijan was elected as a non-permanent member of the United Nations Security Council (2012–2013), twice assumed the presidency in the Security Council and successfully accomplished its term of office. During his tenure as Permanent Representative of the Republic of Azerbaijan to the Unite Nations, Agshin Mehdiyev was also non-resident Ambassador Extraordinary and Plenipotentiary of the Republic of Azerbaijan to Cuba (beginning February 2007), Nicaragua (beginning June 2008), Jamaica (beginning September 2008) and Venezuela (beginning October 2008).

Between May 2014 and November 2015, he served as Ambassador-at-Large at the Ministry of Foreign affairs of the Republic of Azerbaijan. In December 2015, he was assigned as Permanent Observer of the Organization of Islamic Cooperation to the European Union.

On 13 June 2016, the secretary-general of the Organization of Islamic Cooperation, H. E. Iyad Ameen Madani, assigned Agshin Mehdiyev as the Permanent Representative of the Organization of Islamic Cooperation to the United Nations in New York.

Mehdiyev is the author of the book Azerbaijan in the Council of Europe published in 2011, compiled the book Azerbaijan in the United Nations Security Council 2012–2013, as well as the author of an extensive number of publications and studies on different matters including articles on international affairs and political studies.

For his distinguished service, Mehdiyev was awarded 3rd degree Order for Merit to Fatherland in 2012, Honorary Employee of the Ministry of Foreign Affairs of Azerbaijan in 2011, a medal on the occasion of the 90th anniversary of Azerbaijan's diplomatic service in 2009, Honorary Degree of the Ministry of Foreign Affairs of the USSR in 1990, as well as a number of honorary diplomas and degrees.

Mehdiyev was one of the recipients of the 2018 Diwali Award, presented by the Diwali Foundation, USA, in December 2018. In October 2018, Mehdiyev became a member of the International Advisory Council of the International Peace Institute. In addition, he serves as an Honorary Board Member of UN Ambassadors at the International Federation for Peace and Sustainable Development.
