= Adish Mammadov =

Azerbaijani diplomat

- Adış Məmmədov

Ambassador of Azerbaijan to Qatar
- Incumbent
- Assumed office 20 December 2024
- Preceded by: Mahir Aliyev

Ambassador of Azerbaijan to the Czech Republic
- In office 12 March 2020 – 20 December 2024
- Preceded by: Farid Shafiyev
- Succeeded by: Yashar Aliyev

Ambassador of Azerbaijan to Sweden
- In office 12 August 2013 – 12 November 2018

Ambassador of Azerbaijan to Finland and Norway
- In office 28 February 2014 – 12 November 2018

Personal details
- Born: 17 December 1968 (age 57) Seyidbazar, Jalilabad District, Azerbaijan SSR, Soviet Union
- Education: Baku State University
- Occupation: Diplomat

Adish Sakit oghlu Mammadov (Azerbaijani: Adış Sakit oğlu Məmmədov; born 17 December 1968) is an Azerbaijani diplomat who has served as the Ambassador of Azerbaijan to Qatar since December 2024. He previously served as Azerbaijan's ambassador to Sweden from 2013 to 2018, concurrently to Finland and Norway from 2014 to 2018, and to the Czech Republic from 2020 to 2024.

== Early life and career ==
Adish Mammadov was born on 17 December 1968 in Seyidbazar, Jalilabad District.

He graduated in mathematics from Baku State University in 1991 and subsequently undertook postgraduate study in mathematical analysis. He received a PhD in mathematics in 1995. From 2002 to 2005, he studied at Baku State University's Faculty of International Relations and International Law.

From 1995 to 1998, Adish Mammadov was a teacher and senior lecturer in the Department of Mathematical Analysis at Baku State University. He then served as an adviser in the Humanitarian Policy Department of the Presidential Administration of the Republic of Azerbaijan from 1998 to 2000.

== Diplomatic career ==
Adish Mammadov joined the Ministry of Foreign Affairs of Azerbaijan in 2000. He served as First Secretary from 2000 to 2001, headed the ministry's Central Asia Division from 2001 to 2002, and was First Secretary at the Azerbaijani embassy in Iran from 2002 to 2005. Between 2005 and 2013, he served as a counsellor at the ministry.

On 12 August 2013, President Ilham Aliyev appointed Adish Mammadov Ambassador Extraordinary and Plenipotentiary of Azerbaijan to Sweden. On the same day, he was granted the diplomatic rank of Envoy Extraordinary and Plenipotentiary of the First Class.

On 28 February 2014, while resident in Stockholm, Adish Mammadov was concurrently appointed Ambassador Extraordinary and Plenipotentiary to Finland and Norway. He was recalled from the three ambassadorial posts on 12 November 2018.

Adish Mammadov was appointed Ambassador Extraordinary and Plenipotentiary to the Czech Republic on 12 March 2020. He presented his credentials to Czech President Miloš Zeman on 21 October 2020. On 20 December 2024, he was recalled from the post.

On the same day, Adish Mammadov was appointed Ambassador Extraordinary and Plenipotentiary to Qatar. He presented copies of his credentials to Qatar's Minister of State for Foreign Affairs on 26 January 2025 and presented his credentials to Emir Tamim bin Hamad Al Thani the following day.
