= Brown International Organization =

Brown International Organization (BRIO), sometimes wrongfully referred to as the Brown RISD International Organization, is a student-run cultural association at Brown University in Providence, RI, United States. BRIO was established in 1983.

== Origins ==
When BRIO was founded in 1983, it represented a peer-support group for foreign students who were not familiar with many of the customs inherent in the American university system. At this time, the student body demographics were such that the international population at Brown University's campus was very small.

Since 2005 the international student body has grown to represent about 12% of the overall undergraduate student body and 35% of the overall graduate student body in 2016. In Brown University's Class of 2020, about 16% of the students self-identify themselves as international students. This shift in demographics led to more visibility of this group on campus and growth of BRIO.

== Annual Events ==
BRIO organizes many events throughout the academic year which are open to all students on campus, international and domestic alike. Famous are their lecture series which have brought to campus many prominent speakers including Oscar-nominee Milcho Manchevski, ICC lawyer Michael Karnavas, actor Clayton Raithel in addition to numerous others. Some of BRIO's events have turned into beloved annual traditions on Brown University's campus.

=== BRIO Student-Faculty Mixer ===
The BRIO Student-Faculty Mixer (BSFM), formerly known as International Student-Faculty Mixer (ISFM), was organized for the first time in 2005. It was intended to give international students a chance to talk with their favorite faculty members outside of an academic setting. This would allow faculty to better understand the needs and concerns international students faced, and would give students chance to form a personal connection with faculty. This connection is important as students can receive from them advice regarding academics which they would normally get from their parents if they went through the American educational system. Ever since the event has grown and seen attendance from many of the senior administrators, such as Brown University President Christina Paxson, as well as most beloved faculty members at Brown, such as Prof. Barrett Hazeltine, in addition to numerous students.

=== Cupid's Auction ===
Since 2013 BRIO has organized an annual auction of hearts and art to celebrate Valentine's Day. The hearts are BRIO members or other Brown University students who have volunteered to sell a service they can offer, such as teaching a class of foreign language. The art are artistic pieces made by Brown University and RISD students. All the proceeds from the auction go towards the BRIO Impact Fellowship which supports a project by a Brown University student with some international focus. The auction is named after Cupid, the Roman god of love.

=== World Cultural Dinner ===
The World Cultural Dinner (WCD) has been annually organized since the early days of the organization. The exact year when this event was organized for the first time is unknown. It happens in the Spring semester and features a buffet with delicacies from all over the world. During the dinner, BRIO invites many student performance groups to showcase their work, thus building bridges between international and domestic students and celebrating Brown University's diversity. The dinner was attended by Azerbaijani embassy officials and Rhode Island senators in 2015.
