= Yashar Aliyev =

Yashar Aliyev may refer to:

- Yashar Aliyev (wrestler), Azerbaijani freestyle wrestler
- Yashar Aliyev (diplomat), Azerbaijani diplomat
