= Nasimi Aghayev =

Azerbaijani diplomat

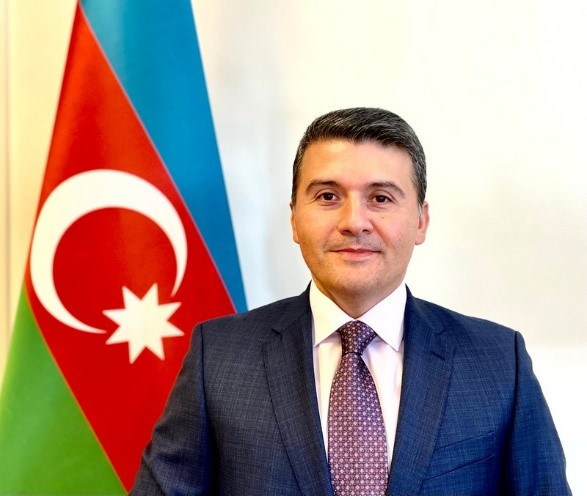

Ambassador of Azerbaijan to Germany
- Incumbent
- Assumed office August 19, 2022

Personal details
- Education: Baku State University; Europa-Institut

Nasimi Aghayev (Azerbaijani: Nəsimi Məhəmmədəli oğlu Ağayev) is the Azerbaijani ambassador to Germany and the former Consul General of Azerbaijan in Los Angeles (2012-2022). Before that, he served at the Embassy of Azerbaijan in Washington, D.C. as a counselor for political and public affairs (2010-2012). He joined Azerbaijan's diplomatic service in 1999 and also served at the country's Embassies in Austria (2000–03) and Germany (2005–08), as well as in the Ministry of Foreign Affairs in Baku.

Aghayev holds a Master of European Law (LL.M.) degree from the Europa-Institut of the Saarland University, Germany, and B.A. and M.A. degrees in International Relations from the Baku State University, Azerbaijan. He was also trained at the Diplomatic Academy of Vienna in Austria.

He has served as the editor-in-chief of the Caucasian Review of International Affairs and wrote a book on Humanitarian Intervention and International Law: NATO operation in Kosovo, published in German in 2007. In addition to his native Azerbaijani language, he also knows English, French, German, Russian, Spanish, and Turkish.

He has a diplomatic rank of Ambassador Extraordinary and Plenipotentiary.

== LA County Supervisors controversy ==
Nasimi Aghayev, as the Consul General of Azerbaijan in Los Angeles, shared a proclamation of recognition on Twitter on behalf of Los Angeles County. However, when this was raised with LA County Supervisors, they stated they had no prior awareness of the proclamation. All four of the LA County Supervisors whose names were on the certificate; Kathryn Barger, Hilda Solis, Janice Hahn, and Holly Mitchell, stated that their signatures had been added to the certificate without their knowledge or permission. An investigation by Los Angeles County found the signatures were mistakenly added by the county's Office of Protocol.
