= Pan-European Phoneathon =

Pan-European Phoneathon is a fundraising event held by the Hayastan All-Armenian Fund's French affiliate (Fonds Armenien de France) and is the second largest fundraising event of the Hayastan Fund after its Telethon aired from Los Angeles.

The four-day Phoneathon, which runs for twelve hours each day, is staffed by Armenian and non-Armenian volunteers. Stationed in Paris, Lyon, Marseille, Nice, and Toulouse, the volunteers call to Armenian and non-Armenian families, businesses, and organizations across Europe and mobilize grassroot support for the development of Armenia and Nagorno Karabakh (Artsakh).

Since the inception of the Pan-European Phoneathon in 2000, more than 400,000 phone calls have been made and more than 10 million euros were raised through the donations of over 22,000 supporters. From 70 volunteers in Paris and close to 220,000 euros raised in 2000, the Pan-European Phoneathon has grown to encompass close to 700 volunteers working in five major French cities and an annual average of 1.4 million euros raised through about 50,000 supporters across Europe. Volunteers make calls from the Orange France Telecom call centers in Paris, Lyon, Marseille and Toulouse.

Pan-European Phoneathon 2013 held from November 21 to 24 will spend the raised funds to support agricultural development projects in Armenia's Tavush Province, construction of community centers in Nagorno Karabakh (Artsakh), as well as assistance to Syrian-Armenians afflicted by the Syrian Civil War. 200 000 Euros has been already allocated to the various needs of the Syrian Armenians.

== Event hosts ==
The Phoneathon hosts a celebrity each year, known as "godfather" or "godmother".

- 2013 - Ariane Ascaride, Robert Guédiguian
- 2012 - Youri Djorkaeff, Daniel Bilalian
- 2011 - Michel Drucker
- 2010 - Hélène Ségara
