= Azerbaijan–United States relations =

- Azerbaijan: United States

Diplomatic mission
- Embassy of Azerbaijan, Washington, D.C.: Embassy of the United States, Baku

Envoy
- Ambassador Khazar Ibrahim: Chargé d'affaires Amy Carlon

Azerbaijan–United States relations refer to bilateral relations between Azerbaijan and the United States since 28 February 1992. According to the 2012 U.S. Global Leadership Report, 53% of Azerbaijanis approve of U.S. leadership, with 27% disapproving and 21% uncertain.

== History ==
A first encounter of the United States-Azerbaijani inter-state relations was the meeting between President of the United States Woodrow Wilson and the delegation of Azerbaijan Democratic Republic to the 1919 Paris Peace Conference. Azerbaijani delegates were unimpressed by the meeting in Paris, as instead of recognition, President Wilson advised them to develop a confederation with their Transcaucasian neighbours on the basis of a mandate granted by the League of Nations. The Azerbaijani question, Wilson concluded, could not be solved prior to the general settlement of the Russian question. But recalling this meeting in his speech at the Commonwealth Club of California in San Francisco on September 18, 1919, Wilson outlined his positive impression of Azerbaijani delegation:

Do you know where Azerbaijan is? Well, one day there came in a very dignified and interesting group of gentlemen who were from Azerbaijan. I didn't have time, until they were gone, to find out where they came from. But I did find this out immediately: that I was talking to men who talked the same language that I did in respect of ideas, in respect of conceptions of liberty, in respect of conceptions of right and justice.

Following the Red Army invasion in April 1920, Azerbaijan SSR was proclaimed, which in 1922 joined Soviet Union as a part of the Transcaucasian Federative Soviet Socialist Republic. No direct inter-state relations existed between Azerbaijan SSR and the United States.

== Contemporary relations ==
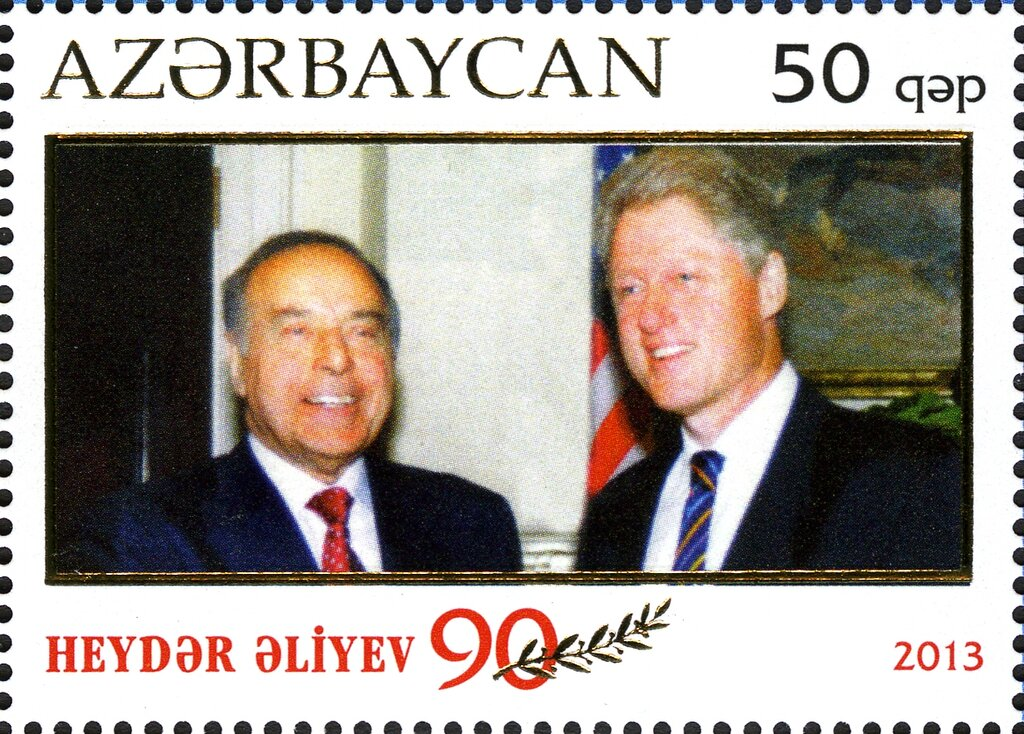
Heydar Aliyev and Bill Clinton (Stamp of Azerbaijan - 2013)

On October 18, 1991, the Azerbaijani parliament adopted a declaration of independence. Subsequently, on December 25, 1991, Soviet Union ceased its existence and the United States formally recognized 12 former Soviet republics, including Azerbaijan, as independent states. On March 6, 1992, Azerbaijan opened its embassy in Washington, and on March 16, 1992, the United States opened its embassy in Baku, the capital of Azerbaijan.

In 2005, as a freshman senator, Barack Obama visited Azerbaijan on a working trip together with Senate colleague Richard Lugar.

Speaking at a conference on U.S.-Azerbaijani relations at Georgetown University in September 2009, the Under Secretary of State for Political Affairs William J. Burns outlined three main areas of interest for the United States in its bilateral relations with Azerbaijan: security cooperation, energy, and economic and democratic reform.

=== U.S. Federal Grand Jury Probe ===
On January 21, 2022, ABC News reported that a federal grand jury in Washington had issued subpoenas to search the home and Texas office of Democratic Congressman Henry Cuellar, “seeking records about a wide array of U.S. companies and advocacy organizations, many of them with ties to the former Soviet nation of Azerbaijan.” According to ABC, a subpoena reviewed by the news organization “asks for records relating to any ‘work, act, favor, or service’ that Cuellar or his wife may have provided at the behest of certain foreign companies, government officials, American business leaders, or others.” Cuellar has denied wrongdoing.

=== Nagorno-Karabakh conflict ===
Modern U.S.-Azerbaijani relations have been strongly influenced by the U.S. official position on the Nagorno-Karabakh conflict between Armenia and Azerbaijan. The U.S. was actively involved in the attempts to resolve the conflict since 1992. As a part of the Conference on Security and Cooperation in Europe (CSCE; now OSCE) mission, US Secretary of State James Baker III proposed a set of rules named after him, which eventually defined the representation of the conflicting sides within the OSCE Minsk Group negotiation format.On August 8, 2025, the conflict came to an end after US President Donald Trump made a peace agreement between the two countries.

In 1992, the U.S. Congress adopted Section 907 of the Freedom Support Act, which banned any direct U.S. aid to the government of Azerbaijan. The ban made Azerbaijan the only exception to the Post-Soviet states receiving U.S. government aid for facilitating economic and political stability. Passage of Section 907 was influenced by the powerful Armenian American lobby in the U.S. Congress, in response to the blockade imposed by Azerbaijan on Armenia in the course of the first Nagorno-Karabakh War. Azerbaijanis consider this legislation to be unfair as, during the same period of time, Armenian forces took control of the fifth of Azerbaijani territory, including Nagorno-Karabakh. Consecutive George H.W. Bush, Clinton and George W. Bush administrations opposed Section 907, viewing it as an impediment to impartial U.S. foreign policy in the region and an obstacle to the U.S. role in the Nagorno-Karabakh conflict mediation efforts. In her 1998 letter to the House Appropriations Committee chairman, Bob Livingston, then U.S. Secretary of State Madeleine Albright wrote:

Section 907 damages US national interests by undermining the administration's neutrality in promoting a settlement in Nagorno-Karabakh, its ability to encourage economic and broad legal reforms in Azerbaijan, and efforts to advance an East-West energy transport corridor.

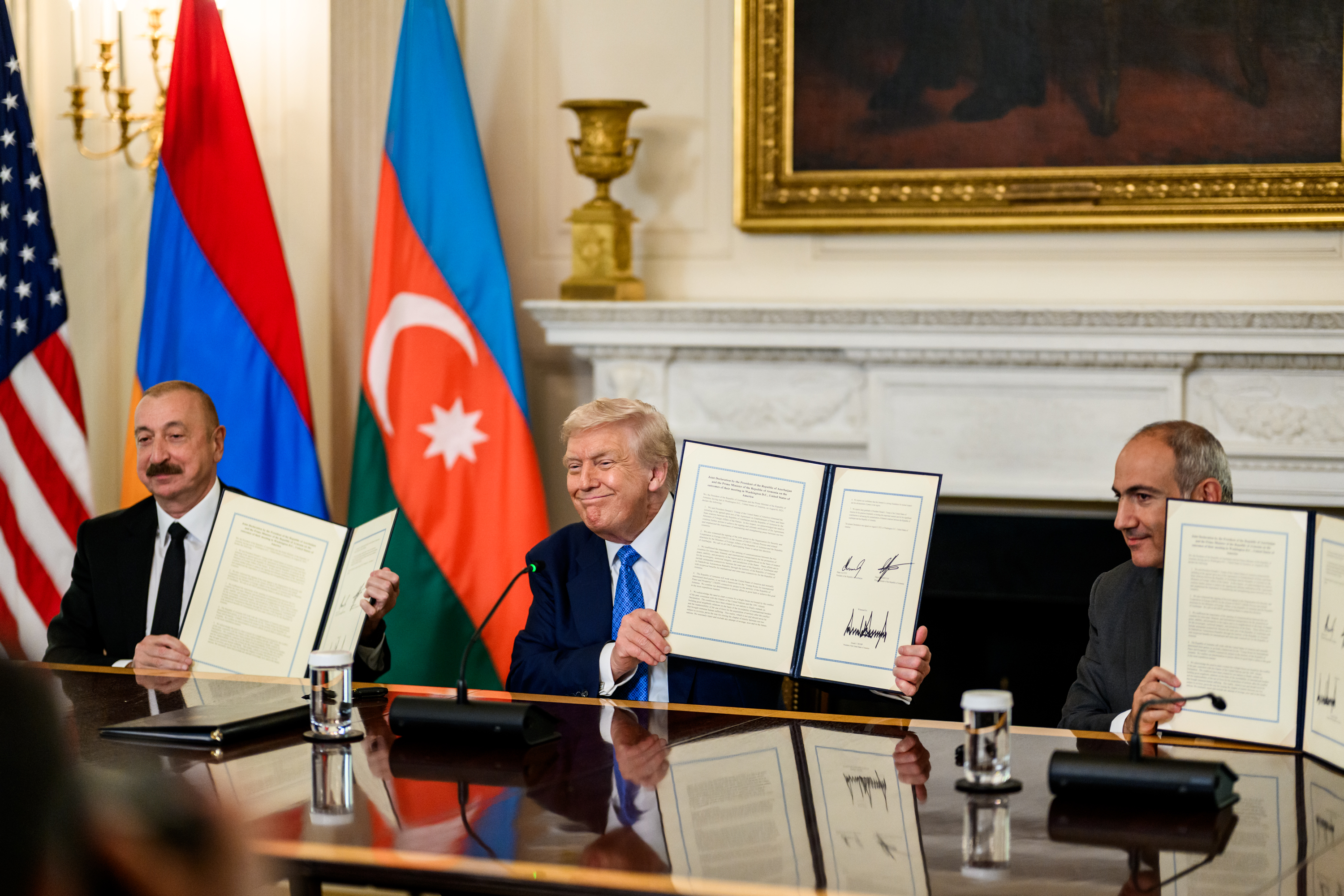
Azerbaijani President Ilham Aliyev, US President Donald Trump and Armenian Prime Minister Nikol Pashinyan signing a trilateral joint declaration in Washington, D.C., on August 8, 2025

After the September 11 attacks in 2001, Congress passed the foreign appropriations legislation of 2002, granting President the right to waive Section 907. In view of Azerbaijan's contribution and support for the US military operations in Afghanistan, President George W. Bush waived the section in January 2002; and President Barack Obama further extended that waiver.

On August 8, 2025, Armenian Prime Minister Nikol Pashinyan and Azerbaijani President Ilham Aliyev signed a peace agreement in a ceremony hosted by President Donald Trump in the White House, ending the more than 35-year conflict between Armenia and Azerbaijan.

=== Security partnership ===
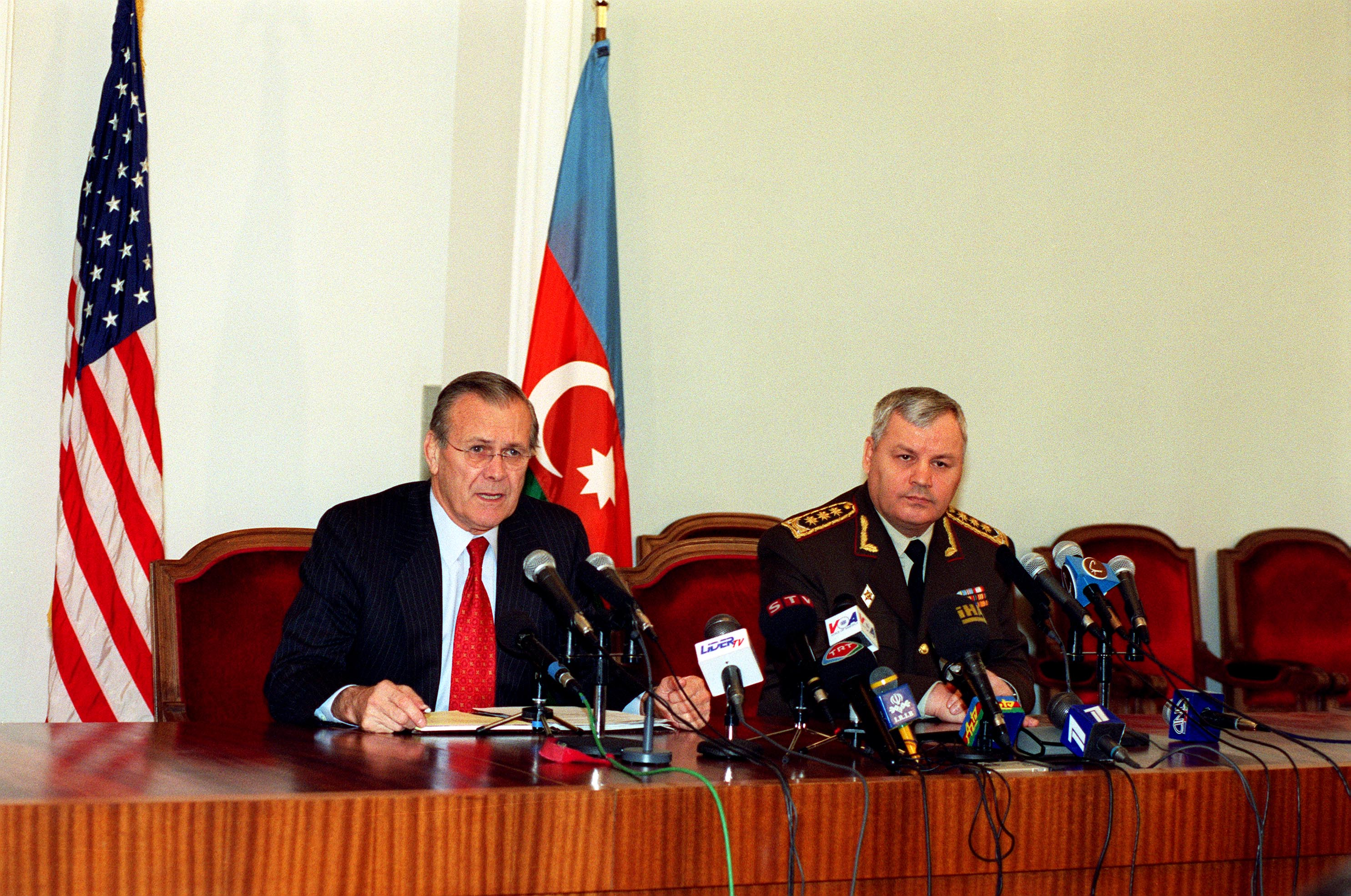
Donald Rumsfeld with Safar Abiyev during a press conference in Baku

The U.S.-Azerbaijani security relations developed along several paths, including Azerbaijan's active participation in the NATO's Partnership for Peace program and the U.S.-led missions in Kosovo, Afghanistan and Iraq; and the bilateral military ties to ensure Caspian energy and transportation security. In support of the U.S.-led war on terror, apart from troop contributions, Azerbaijan provided overflight, refueling, and landing rights for U.S. and coalition aircraft bound for Afghanistan and Iraq; shared information to combat terrorism financing; detained and prosecuted suspected terrorists. Apart from usage of Azerbaijani airspace by U.S. air forces, over one-third of all of the nonlethal equipment including fuel, clothing, and food used by the U.S. military in Afghanistan travels through Baku. In November 2011, the United States Secretary of the Navy Ray Mabus met with the Azerbaijani President and Defense Minister announcing the military ties between their countries would expand. The U.S. State Department already offered Azerbaijan $10 million to enhance its security structures in the Caspian Sea earlier that year.

=== Economic cooperation ===
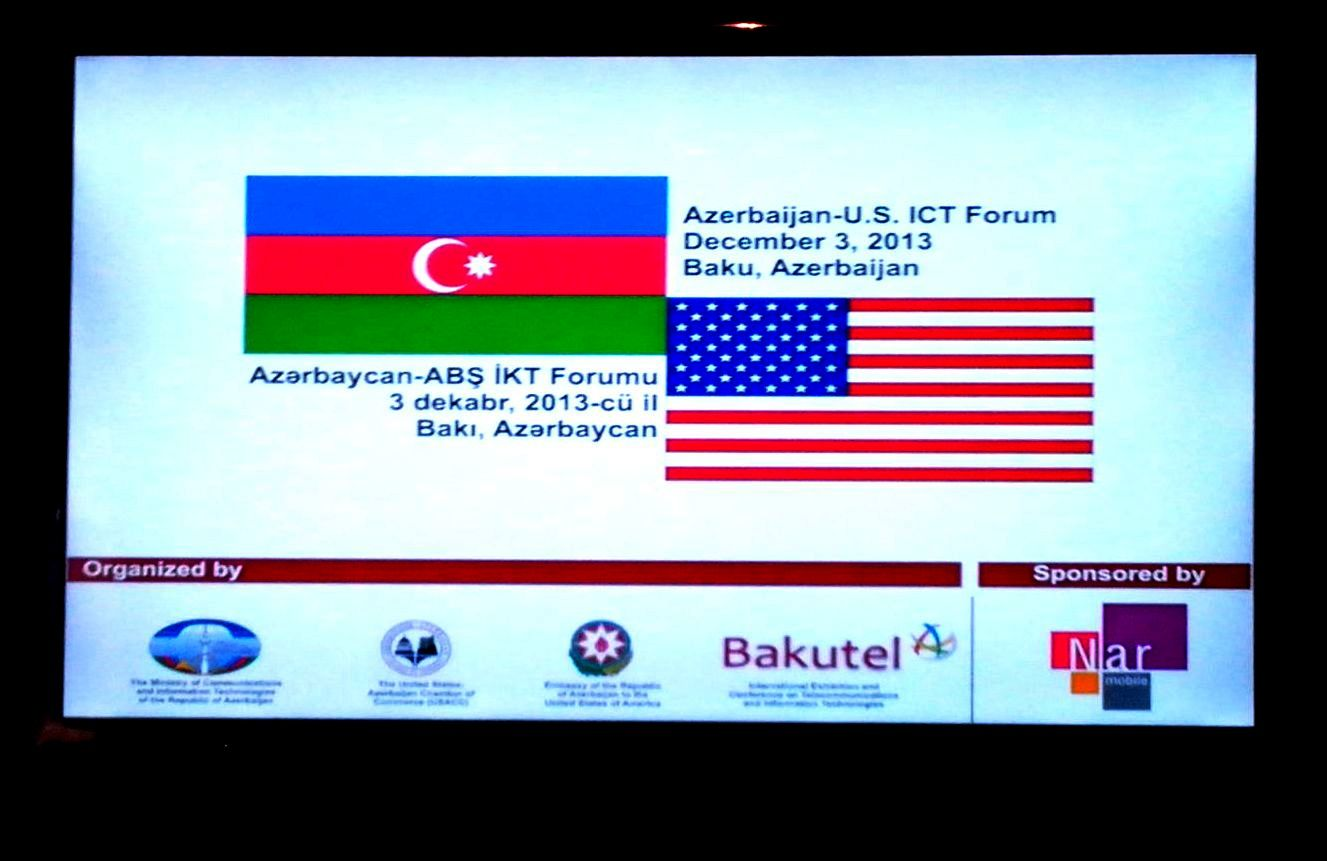
Azerbaijan-U.S. ICT Forum, December 3, 2013

U.S.–Azerbaijani ties in the economic sphere developed primarily in the context of Caspian energy resources and their transportation to Western markets. The U.S. companies are actively involved in the development of Caspian hydrocarbons in offshore Azerbaijani oilfields, and the U.S. government actively supported the Baku–Tbilisi–Ceyhan pipeline as the primary route of transportation for Caspian oil.

In January 2008, commenting on a trip to Azerbaijan by Sen. Richard Lugar, R-Ind., head of the Senate Foreign Relations Committee, John C.K. Daily of UPI called Azerbaijan "the one remaining friend that America has in the Caspian basin". During this visit Sen. Lugar also suggested that he along with fellow Senate Foreign Relations Committee member Joseph Biden, D-Del., endorsed the need for "a special representative focused on energy issues in the Caspian to safeguard long-term U.S. interests" in a letter they sent earlier to Secretary of State Condoleezza Rice.

The United States has signed a bilateral trade agreement with Azerbaijan, granting it the status of a "most favored nation", in 1995; and a bilateral investment treaty with Azerbaijan, naming it a beneficiary country under the Generalized System of Preferences (GSP) program, in 2008. The U.S. also supports Azerbaijan's application for accession to the World Trade Organization.

=== Democracy development ===
Remarks made by U.S. officials praise Azerbaijan as the first secular democracy in a majority-Muslim nation. In spite of this, it commonly scores poorly in independent assessments of democratic governance published by non-governmental organizations. For example, Freedom House’s Freedom in the World 2018 report listed Azerbaijan as “not free”, with a score of 12/100. One component of the aid package provided by the U.S. government to Azerbaijan focuses on democratic development assistance “with an emphasis on support for civil society, independent media, and rule of law.” The largest part of this assistance is provided by the United States Agency for International Development.

In 2014, Deputy Assistant Secretary Thomas O. Melia of the Bureau of Democracy, Human Rights, and Labor noted in a written testimony that “Azerbaijan has taken some positive steps” in building democratic institutions and developing democratic norms. “More broadly, however, we have been seeing increasing constraints on fundamental freedoms that increase the risk of domestic instability, undermine the confidence the rule of law will be respected, and prevent Azerbaijanis from reaching their full potential.” United States Department of State press releases between 2011 and 2016 note concern with the actions of the Azerbaijan government over the sentencing of journalists and human rights activists as part of a “broad pattern of increasing restrictions on human rights in Azerbaijan.” Deputy Assistant Secretary Melia's statement lists a number of democratic transgressions, including limiting foreign NGO involvement, incarcerating journalists and peaceful protestors, and withholding travel rights to activists. “These are not the kinds of actions the United States or the broader international community wants to see from a partner, an OSCE participating State, and currently the chair of the Committee of Ministers of the Council of Europe.“

Eric Rubin, Deputy Assistant Secretary at the Bureau of European and Eurasian Affairs, also commented on Azerbaijan's democratic track record. In a testimony submitted to the Commission on Security and Cooperation in Europe in 2014, he wrote:

“I want to emphasize that the United States remains committed to a constructive dialogue with Azerbaijan based on friendship between our people and mutual respect between our governments. But a constructive dialogue means that we can and must have frank and honest discussions in areas where we disagree. Discussing matters of agreement and disagreement in a candid way is part of the nature of a serious dialogue. We therefore have been disappointed by allegations by some of Azerbaijan’s authorities that the United States is interfering in the country’s domestic affairs when we share our views or send democracy-related delegations to Azerbaijan."

== High-level visits ==
=== Azerbaijani presidential visits to the United States ===
President	Date	Type of visit	Sources
President H.Aliyev	September 25-30, 1994	working visit	
President H.Aliyev	October 20-26, 1995	working visit	
President H.Aliyev	July 27- August 6, 1997	official visit	
President H.Aliyev	April 22-27, 1999	working visit	
President H.Aliyev	February 12-18, 2000	working visit	
President H.Aliyev	September 4-9, 2000	working visit	
President H.Aliyev	April 1-13, 2001	working visit	
President H.Aliyev	February 14-23, 2003	official visit	
President I.Aliyev	April 25-28, 2006	official visit	
President I.Aliyev	September 24, 2010	working visit	
President I.Aliyev	May 2-4, 2012	working visit	
President I.Aliyev	May 20-21, 2012	working visit	
President I.Aliyev	April 1, 2016	official visit	
President I.Aliyev	September 19, 2017	official visit	
President I.Aliyev	August 7-9, 2025	working visit	

== Resident diplomatic missions ==
- Azerbaijan has an embassy in Washington, D.C. and a consulate-general in Los Angeles.
- United States has an embassy in Baku.

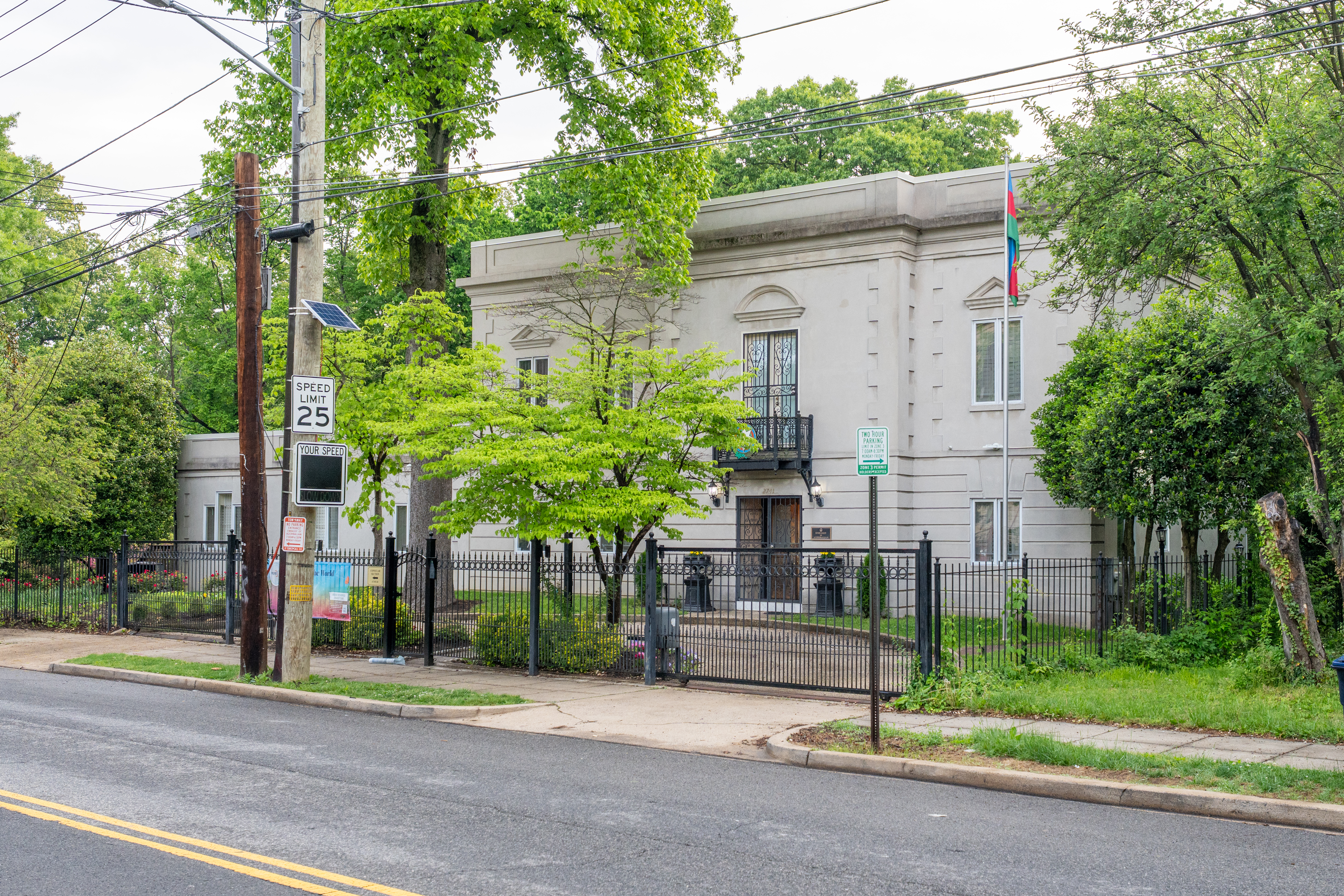
Embassy of Azerbaijan in Washington, D.C.

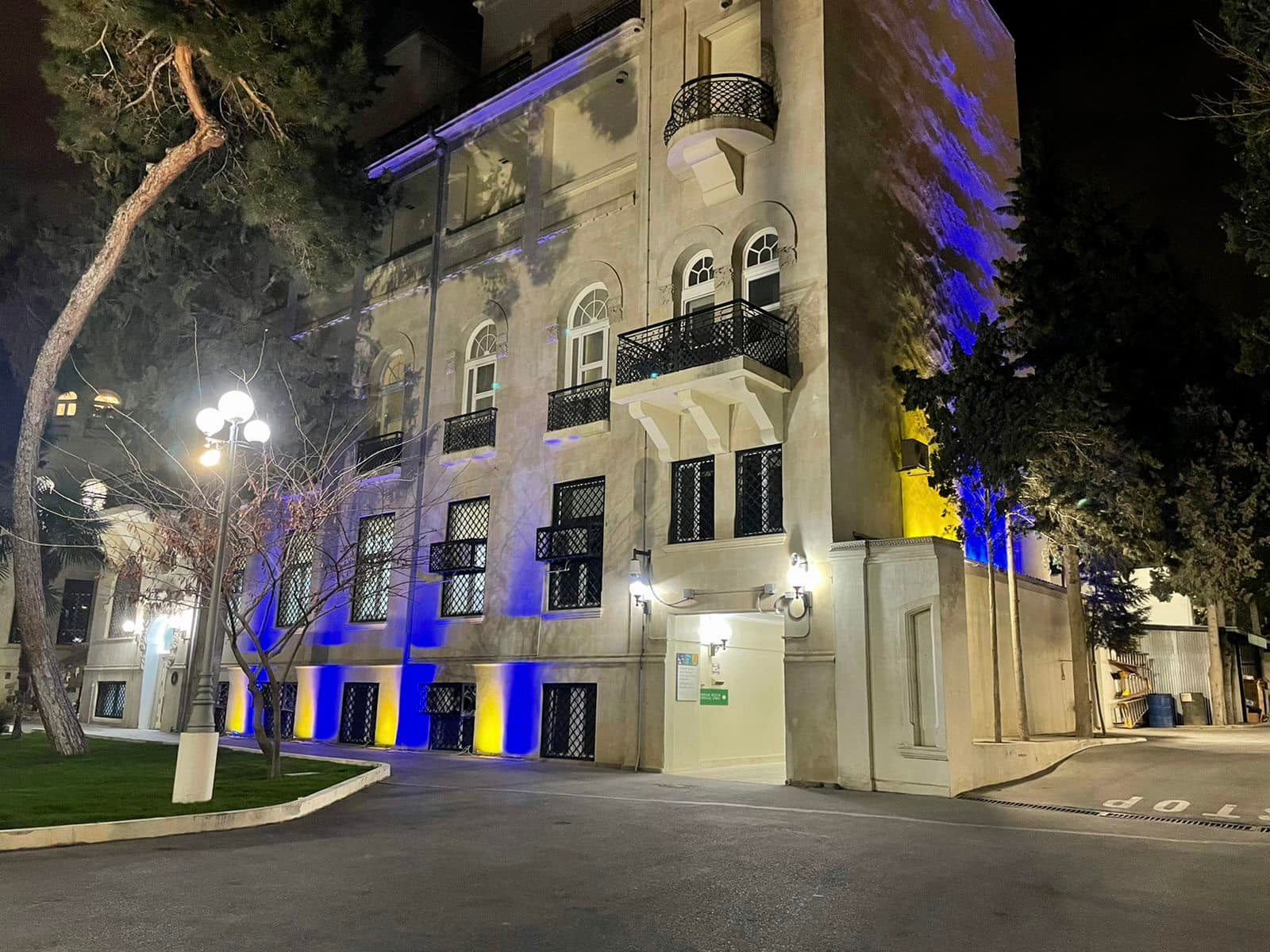
Embassy of the United States in Baku

== See also ==
- Foreign relations of Azerbaijan
- Foreign relations of the United States
- Moscow Summit (1972)
- Azerbaijani Americans
- United States Ambassador to Azerbaijan
- U.S.-Azerbaijan Chamber of Commerce
- Section 907
- Artsakh–United States relations
