= Azerbaijan–Peru relations =

- Azerbaijan: Peru

Diplomatic mission
- Embassy of Azerbaijan, Lima: None (Accredited from Turkey)

Bilateral relations and interactions exist between Azerbaijan and Peru.

== Diplomatic relations ==
Diplomatic relations between the Republic of Azerbaijan and the Republic of Peru were established in 1996.

The Embassy of Azerbaijan in the Peruvian capital Lima has operated since 2015. The Embassy of Peru in Baku was opened on June 2, 2017 and then closed on March 1, 2020.

Mehdi Mammadov is the Chargé d'Affaires of the Embassy of Azerbaijan in Lima since June 3, 2015.

There is a joint Azerbaijani-Peruvian inter-parliamentary working group is functioning in the National Assembly of Azerbaijan.

In November 2015, there was the Peru-Azerbaijan friendship group established in the Congress of Peru. Group is led by Elias Nicholas Rodriguez.

Legal framework: two documents have been signed between the Republic of Azerbaijan and the Republic of Peru.

In 2018, governments of these two countries signed a Memorandum of understanding.

== High-level visits ==
On August 2, 2012, Minister of Foreign Affairs of Azerbaijan Elmar Mammadyarov paid an official visit to Peru.

On September 25, 2013, the Minister of Foreign Affairs of Azerbaijan Elmar Mammadyarov met with the Minister of foreign affairs of Peru Eda Rivas during the 68th session of the UN General Assembly.

On July 6, 2019, the Minister of Foreign Affairs of Azerbaijan Elmar Mammadyarov paid a working visit to Peru.

== Economic relations ==
Business forums are held with the participation of CEOs from both countries.

Azerbaijani oil and gas companies are investing in Peru.

It is planned to export such food products as cocoa, asparagus, grapes, nuts, sugar, tangerines, bananas, mango, shrimps, etc. to Azerbaijan.

== International cooperation ==
On June 10, 2013, the Peruvian Congress issued a statement recognizing the Khojaly massacre as genocide.

Peru supports Azerbaijan's position within the organization named Pacific Alliance (Alianza del Pacífico).

== Cultural connections ==
In September–October 2018, at the initiative of the Ministry of culture of Azerbaijan, the Embassy of Peru in Azerbaijan, the Department of the State historical and architectural reserve "Icheri Sheher", as well as the Scientific Association "Arts Council Azerbaijan", an exhibition of Peruvian artists entitled "Landscapes of the Peruvian Andes" was held in the old part of Baku at the Art Tower art gallery for the first time.

In 2018, the Ministry of culture of Azerbaijan and the Ministry of culture of Peru signed an agreement on cooperation in the field of culture.

Joint activities are carried out in the field of education, as well as defense.

== Resident diplomatic missions ==
- Azerbaijan has an embassy office in Lima.
- Peru is accredited to Azerbaijan from its embassy in Moscow, Russia.

== See also ==
- Foreign relations of Azerbaijan
- Foreign relations of Peru
- List of ambassadors of Azerbaijan to Peru
- List of ambassadors of Peru to Azerbaijan
