= Yashar Aliyev (diplomat) =

Azerbaijani diplomat (born 1955)

- Yaşar Əliyev
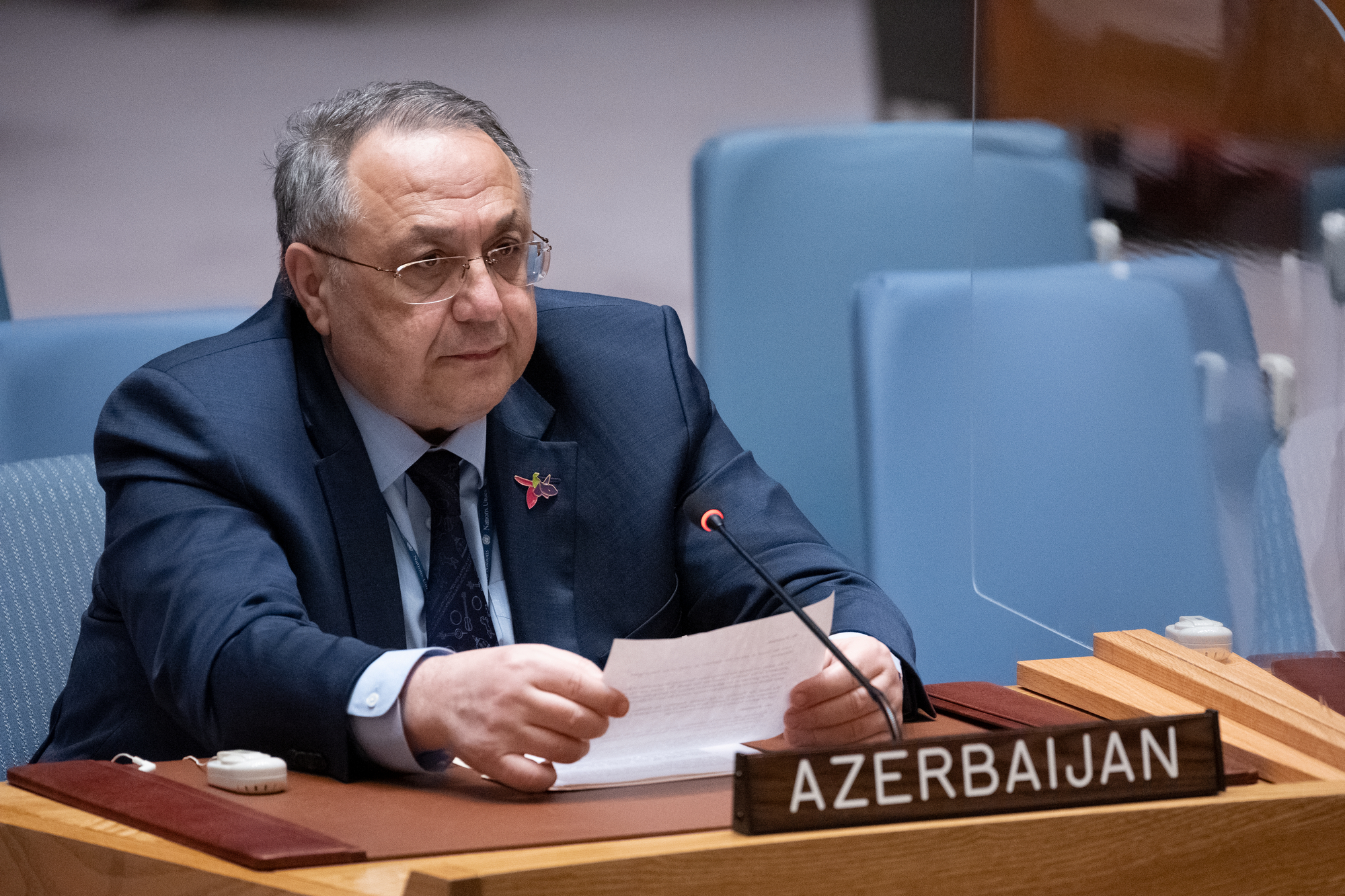
- Yashar Aliyev in 2021

Ambassador of Azerbaijan to the Czech Republic
- Incumbent
- Assumed office 20 December 2024
- Preceded by: Adish Mammadov

Permanent Representative of Azerbaijan to the United Nations
- In office 11 April 2014 – 20 December 2024
- Preceded by: Agshin Mehdiyev
- Succeeded by: Tofig Musayev
- In office 21 January 2002 – 9 October 2006
- Preceded by: Eldar Guliyev
- Succeeded by: Agshin Mehdiyev

Ambassador of Azerbaijan to Cuba
- In office 18 September 2014 – 19 August 2022
- Preceded by: Agshin Mehdiyev
- Succeeded by: Ruslan Rzayev
- In office 1 November 2005 – 9 October 2006
- Preceded by: Position established
- Succeeded by: Agshin Mehdiyev

Ambassador of Azerbaijan to the United States
- In office 9 October 2006 – 26 October 2011
- Preceded by: Hafiz Pashayev
- Succeeded by: Elin Suleymanov

Permanent Observer of Azerbaijan to the Organization of American States
- In office 2 February 2007 – 26 October 2011
- Preceded by: Hafiz Pashayev
- Succeeded by: Elin Suleymanov

Ambassador of Azerbaijan to Mexico
- In office 22 June 2007 – 14 April 2009
- Preceded by: Hafiz Pashayev
- Succeeded by: Ilgar Mukhtarov

Personal details
- Born: 19 August 1955 (age 71) Baku, Azerbaijan SSR, Soviet Union
- Children: 3
- Parent: Teymur Elchin (father)
- Education: Azerbaijan State University, Diplomatic Academy of the Ministry of Foreign Affairs of the USSR
- Occupation: Diplomat
- Awards: Order For Service to the Fatherland

Yashar Teymur oghlu Aliyev (Azerbaijani: Yaşar Teymur oğlu Əliyev; born 19 August 1955) is an Azerbaijani diplomat who has served as Ambassador of Azerbaijan to the Czech Republic since 2024. He was the Permanent Representative of Azerbaijan to the United Nations from 2002 to 2006 and again from 2014 to 2024. Previously, he served as Ambassador of Azerbaijan to the United States from 2006 to 2011, with concurrent accreditation to Mexico from 2007 to 2009. He was also Azerbaijan's first ambassador to Cuba, serving from 2005 to 2006 and again from 2014 to 2022.

== Early life and education ==
Yashar Aliyev was born in Baku on 19 August 1955. He studied Oriental studies at Azerbaijan State University from 1972 to 1977. He subsequently undertook postgraduate study at the Institute of Oriental Studies of the Academy of Sciences in Moscow from 1980 to 1982, and later attended the Diplomatic Academy of the Ministry of Foreign Affairs of Russia in the early 1990s.

== Diplomatic career ==
=== Early career ===
After graduating from university, Yashar Aliyev worked at academic institutions in Azerbaijan. He served in Soviet military and trade missions in Iraq from 1977 to 1979 and in Kuwait from 1985 to 1988.

In 1989, Yashar Aliyev joined Azerbaijan's Ministry of Foreign Affairs as a political officer in the Department of Information and Political Analysis. He subsequently served as first secretary and deputy head of the department. In 1992, he became head of the Ministry's Department of International Organizations and later that year joined Azerbaijan's Permanent Mission to the United Nations in New York as counsellor for political affairs.

He served as chargé d'affaires in 1993 and 2001, and was a delegate to the First and Fourth Committees of the United Nations General Assembly during its 47th to 56th sessions.

=== First term at the United Nations ===
Yashar Aliyev was appointed Permanent Representative of Azerbaijan to the United Nations in January 2002 and presented his credentials to Secretary-General Kofi Annan on 12 March 2002.

During his first term, he served as a vice-president of the 59th session of the United Nations General Assembly and of the United Nations Economic and Social Council in 2004–2005. He was chairman of the General Assembly's Fourth Committee during the 2005–2006 session.

In November 2005, Yashar Aliyev was concurrently appointed Ambassador of Azerbaijan to Cuba, with residence in New York.

=== Ambassador to the United States ===
Yashar Aliyev was appointed Ambassador of Azerbaijan to the United States on 9 October 2006. On 2 February 2007, he was additionally appointed Azerbaijan's Permanent Observer to the Organization of American States. He also served concurrently as Ambassador of Azerbaijan to Mexico from 2007 to 2009. Yashar Aliyev held the posts of Ambassador to the United States and Permanent Observer to the Organization of American States until October 2011.

Yashar Aliyev was appointed Ambassador to Mexico, resident in Washington, on 22 June 2007. He was recalled from that post in April 2009.

=== Second term at the United Nations ===
On 11 April 2014, Yashar Aliyev was appointed Permanent Representative of Azerbaijan to the United Nations for a second time. He presented his credentials to Secretary-General Ban Ki-moon on 10 June 2014 and remained in the post until December 2024 when he was recalled from his post.

On 18 September 2014, Yashar Aliyev was concurrently appointed Ambassador of Azerbaijan to Cuba for a second time, with residence in New York and served until 19 August 2022.

=== Ambassador to the Czech Republic ===
On 20 December 2024, Aliyev was appointed Ambassador of Azerbaijan to the Czech Republic. He presented his credentials to President Petr Pavel on 17 February 2025.

== Honours ==
In 2019, Aliyev was awarded the third degree of the Order For Service to the Fatherland for his work in Azerbaijan's diplomatic service.

== Personal life ==
Yashar Aliyev is fluent in Azeri, English, Arabic, Russian and Turkish. He is married and has three children.

He is the son of Teymur Elchin.
