= Amaliya Panahova =

- Born: Amaliya Alish gizi Panahova; 15 June 1945; Ganja, Azerbaijan SSR
- Died: 8 November 2018 (aged 73); Baku, Azerbaijan
- Occupations: actress, producer
- Spouse: Yusif Muxtarov
- Children: İlqar Muxtarov

Amaliya Alish gizi Panahova (Azerbaijani: Amaliya Əliş qızı Pənahova; 15 June 1945 – 8 November 2018) was an Azerbaijani film and stage actress. She was a People's Artist of the Republic of Azerbaijan.

She died of cancer in Baku on 8 November 2018, at the age of 73.

== Selected filmography ==
- The Day Passed (film, 1971)
- Babek (film, 1979)
