= Elin Suleymanov =

Azerbaijani diplomat (born 1970)

Elin Suleymanov Elin Süleymanov
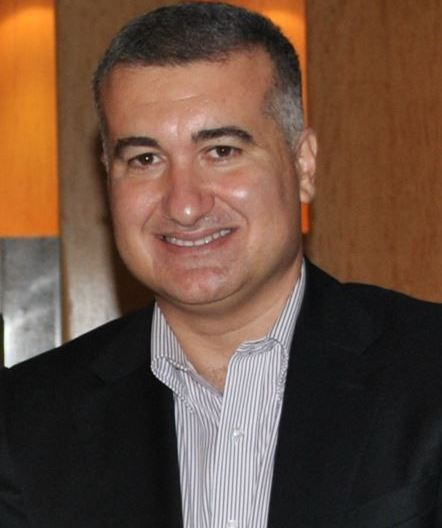

Ambassador of Azerbaijan to the United States
- In office October 26, 2011 – September 15, 2021
- President: Ilham Aliyev
- Preceded by: Yashar Aliyev
- Succeeded by: Khazar Ibrahim

Consul General of Azerbaijan Republic in Los Angeles
- In office November 14, 2005 – October 26, 2011
- Preceded by: office established
- Succeeded by: Nasimi Aghayev

Personal details
- Born: 1970 (age 55–56) Baku, Azerbaijan SSR, USSR
- Education: Azerbaijan State University; Moscow State University; University of Toledo; Fletcher School of Law and Diplomacy

Elin Emin oglu Suleymanov (Azerbaijani: Elin Emin oğlu Süleymanov) is the Ambassador of the Republic of Azerbaijan to the United Kingdom and former Ambassador of Republic of Azerbaijan to the United States.

== Early years ==
A career diplomat, Suleymanov was born in Baku, Azerbaijan. He has graduated with bachelor's degrees in Geography from Azerbaijan State University in 1989, in Political Geography from Moscow State University in Russia in 1992 and a master's degree in Public Administration from University of Toledo in Ohio in 1994. He also holds a graduate degree from Fletcher School of Law and Diplomacy with an emphasis on international security studies and public international law. Furthermore, he was the first Azerbaijani to study at Fletcher School. Before joining diplomatic service, Suleymanov worked with the United Nations High Commissioner for Refugees in Azerbaijan and at Open Media Research Institute in Prague in 1995-1997.

== Diplomatic career ==
Having worked as the First Secretary and Press attaché at the Embassy of Azerbaijan in Washington, D.C., Suleymanov then served as the Senior Counselor at the Foreign Relations Department of the Presidential Administration of Azerbaijan Republic. On November 14, 2005 the President of the Republic of Azerbaijan Ilham Aliyev appointed Suleymanov Azerbaijan’s first Consul General to Los Angeles, California, with the rank of Envoy Extraordinary and Plenipotentiary. As a Consul to 13 states, Suleymanov has played a big role in enhancing knowledge about Azerbaijan and building the relationship between his country and individual states. On October 26, 2011 Suleymanov was appointed Ambassador of Azerbaijan Republic to the United States. Ten years later he was appointed ambassador to the UK.

Suleymanov is fluent in Azerbaijani, English, Russian, Turkish, and Czech.
