= List of ambassadors of Azerbaijan to Peru =

Ambassador of Azerbaijan to Peru
- Emblem of Azerbaijan
- Incumbent; Mammad Talibov since July 2021
- Ministry of Foreign Affairs
- Residence: Mexico D.F.
- Appointer: The president of Azerbaijan
- Formation: 1996

The ambassador of Azerbaijan to the Republic of Peru is the official representative of Azerbaijan to Peru. Despite the presence of an Azeri embassy in Lima since 2015, the ambassador accredited to Peru resides in Mexico.

== List of representatives ==
Name	Term begin	Term end	President	Notes
İlqar Muxtarov	November 7, 2011	2015	Ilham Aliyev	As non-resident ambassador. Under his tenure, talks to open an embassy in Peru were successfully carried out.
Mehdi Mammadov	June 3, 2015	Incumbent	Ilham Aliyev	As chargé d'affaires (a.i.), as well as first secretary, resident in Lima.
Mammad Talibov	July 2021	Incumbent	Ilham Aliyev	As non-resident ambassador. He presented his credentials on July 19, 2021.

== See also ==
- Azerbaijan–Peru relations
- List of ambassadors of Peru to Azerbaijan
