= Ilgar Mukhtarov =

Azerbaijani diplomat (born 1969)

İlqar Muxtarov

Ambassador of Azerbaijan to the Holy See
- Incumbent
- Assumed office 17 October 2022
- Preceded by: Rahman Mustafayev

Ambassador of Azerbaijan to Mexico
- In office 14 April 2009 – 27 January 2016
- Preceded by: Yashar Aliyev
- Succeeded by: Mammad Talibov

Personal details
- Born: 29 September 1969 (age 57) Baku, Azeri SSR, USSR
- Parent(s): Yusif Muxtarov; Amaliya Panahova
- Education: Baku State University
- Awards: Fatherland Service Order

Mukhtarov Ilgar Yusif oglu (Azerbaijani: Muxtarov İlqar Yusif oğlu; born 29 September 1969 in Baku) is an Azerbaijani diplomat, and lawyer who is the incumbent ambassador to the Holy See. He previously served as his country's first ambassador to Mexico (having previously served as a chargé d'affaires) from 2009 to 2016, being also concurrently accredited to Costa Rica, Guatemala, Colombia, Panama, Peru and Honduras.

== Biography ==
Born in Baku, he was the son of acting couple Yusif Muxtarov and Amaliya Panahova.

He worked as a chargé d'affaires in the embassy in Mexico City until he was appointed ambassador in April 2009, being subsequently accredited to six other Latin American countries. During his tenure as non-resident ambassador to Peru, talks to open an embassy in Lima were successfully carried out.

Mukhtarov is fluent in Russian, English, Turkish, Arabic, and has a working understanding of Spanish. He is married and has a son.

Mukhtarov, in his role as Azerbaijani Ambassador to the Holy See, was awarded the Knight Grand Cross of the Order of Pope Pius IX along with the ambassadors of Japan, Spain, Austria, France, and other countries on this occasion. The order was presented by Archbishop Edgar Peña Parra.
