= Seyidbazar =

- Municipality
- Location within Azerbaijan
- Coordinates: 39°10′06″N 48°25′56″E
- Country: Azerbaijan
- Rayon: Jalilabad

Population
  - Total: 1,171
- Time zone: UTC+4 (AZT)
  - Summer (DST): UTC+5 (AZT)

Seyidbazar (also, Seyid bazar and Seidbazar) is a village and municipality in the Jalilabad Rayon of Azerbaijan. It has a population of 1,171.
