= Armenia Fund =

Non-profit organization

Armenia Fund (full name Hayastan All Armenian Fund, Armenian: Հայաստան համահայկական հիմնադրամ) was established in 1994 in Los Angeles, California. Armenia Fund, Inc. is a 501(c)(3) tax-exempt, non-governmental, non-political corporation, headquartered in Yerevan. Serving as the United States' Western Region affiliate of the "Hayastan" All-Armenian Fund along with its nineteen subsidiaries around the world, Armenia Fund, Inc. has issued over $120 million of electricity development guarantee and humanitarian revenue for Armenia. As of 2015, the government of Armenia has been contributing to the fund since the fund was receiving less support and not being able to meet its initial goals.

== Goals ==
Armenia Fund attempts to rebuild Armenia's economy and assist in the well-being of life in the region. Additionally, the organization attempts to rebuild major infrastructures damaged in Karabakh during the first Nagorno-Karabakh War. The Fund has adopted a policy to go "Beyond Bricks and Mortar" to provide sustainability for projects it sponsors.

== Network ==
"Hayastan" All-Armenian Fund, Armenia Fund USA Inc.'s parent organization, through its affiliate organizations has presence in 16 countries around the world: United States, Canada, Brazil, Argentina, Great Britain, France, Netherlands, Germany, Switzerland, Austria, Sweden, Greece, Cyprus, Lebanon, Syria, and Australia.

=== Corporate Board of Armenia Fund USA Inc. ===
1. Maria Mehranian, President/Chairman;
2. Armenian Assembly of America;
3. Armenian Cultural Foundation;
4. Armenian Catholic Eparchy of U.S. and Canada;
5. Armenian Evangelical Union of North America;
6. Armenian General Benevolent Union;
7. Armenian Relief Society of Western U.S.A.;
8. Nor Serount Cultural Association;
9. Nor Or Charitable Foundation;
10. Western Diocese of the Armenian Apostolic Church of America;
11. Western Prelacy of the Armenian Apostolic Church of North America;

== Famous donors ==
Some of the most famous donors and supporters of Armenia Fund include Kirk Kerkorian, the Kardashians, Serj Tankian of System of a Down and Cher. In 2020, due to the Nagorno-Karabakh (Artsakh) war, Kim Kardashian donated $1 million. System of a Down released two new songs after 15 years, donating all the proceeds to Armenia Fund. As of December 2020, they had raised nearly $1 million as a result.

== Telethon ==
Beginning in 1997, an annual telethon was set up and televised across the globe. The annual telethon takes place on Thanksgiving Day on various Armenian TV channels worldwide. On October 10, 2020, a special edition telethon took place to collect funds due to the 2020 war that broke out between Azerbaijan and Artsakh.

Telethon No.	Year	Raised	Phoneathon	Main Goal
1st	1997	$2,600,000		rebuilding Karabakh's infrastructure
2nd	1998	$2,100,000		55-kilometer Segment of Goris-Stepanakert Highway
3rd	1999	$5,006,196		to construct the 169-km north–south "Backbone" Highway in Karabakh
4th	2000	$2,482,567		continued construction of the North-South Highway in Karabakh, Armenia, as well as the construction of four schools in the country's earthquake zone
cancelled	2001	$0		Armenia Fund and its 19 worldwide affiliates cancelled the 2001 Telethon in solidarity with their American brothers and sisters over the tragic events of September 11, 2001
5th	2002	$5,000,000	$650,000	continued construction of the North-South Highway in Karabakh
6th	2003	$6,000,000		to build north–south "Backbone" Highway in Karabakh
7th	2004	$11,400,000		to complete the north–south "Backbone" Highway in Karabakh
8th	2005	$7,770,000		revitalizing war torn region of Mardakert (Karabakh) - including renovation of a regional hospital, construction of a water pipeline network, agricultural development, and the construction of new local school.
9th	2006	$13,700,000		revitalizing war torn region of Hadrut (Karabakh) - including reconstruction of a regional hospital, a series of new schools, new water pipelines and distribution networks, as well a comprehensive regional agricultural development program
10th	2007	$15,275,000		revitalizing Armenia's rural villages in Tavush Region (part of Village Development Program)
11th	2008	$35,000,000		core infrastructure projects in remote areas of Armenia and Karabakh (Martuni, Mardakert, Hadrut)
12th	2009	$15,875,043	$1,800,000	development of war-ravaged town of Shushi
13th	2010	$20,862,733	€1,300,000	development of modern drinking and irrigation water systems in Karabakh's 200 villages
14th	2011	$31,000,000	€1,350,000	vital water and rural development projects in Armenia
15th	2012	$21,400,000	€1,425,000	"community centers – multi-purpose structures housing a health care center, a library, a modern computer room with internet access, an auditorium for trainings, town hall meetings and cultural events, as well as a village administration and accounting office."
16th	2013	$22,661,372	€1,460,000	Vartenis to Martakert Highway which will connect the northern regions of Armenia and Nagorno Karabakh
17th	2014	$12,399,550	€1,370,000	Vartenis to Martakert Highway which will connect the northern regions of Armenia and Nagorno Karabakh
18th	2015	$10,378,465		Construct single-family homes for families in Nagorno Karabakh who have five or more children and lack adequate housing.
19th	2016	$15,428,777	€1,340,000	Rebuilding of war-ravaged communities in Nagorno Karabakh, emergency and disaster preparedness for Nagorno Karabakh, and the construction of homes for Nagorno Karabakh families with multiple children.
20th	2017	$12,505,456		support of agricultural-development projects in Nagorno-Karabakh
21st	2018	$11,109,633		variety of large-scale development projects, including introduction of latest field irrigation and solar power technologies to Armenia's and Artsakh's economically depressed areas
22nd	2019	$9,856,100		fresh infrastructure projects in Nagorno-Karabakh (Artsakh) and Armenia
Special Edition	October 10, 2020	$30 million		For humanitarian needs of Nagorno-Karabakh (Artsakh) due to the recent 2020 war
23rd	2020	$22.9 million		Provided a critical lifeline to Armenians who have been left homeless and destitute by Nagorno-Karabakh (Artsakh) aggressions.
24th	2021	$12 million		For Humanitarian, Civilian and Infrastructural Relief
25th (Anniversary)	2022	$64,820,000		Helping displaced families across Armenia and Artsakh; To mobilize the worldwide Armenian community, calling for continued support of the ongoing recovery of the homeland while reporting on projects and programs that were implemented in the course of the past 12 months.

== See also ==
- Pan-European Phoneathon
