= Teymur Elchin =

Teymur Suleyman ogly Aliyev (Azerbaijani: Teymur Süleyman oğlu Əliyev), better known as Teymur Elchin, (March 28, 1924 – March 14, 1992) was a prominent Azerbaijani poet and publicist who is also noted for his distinguished political career.

Teymur Elchin was born in the mountainous town Shusha of Nagorny Karabakh region of Azerbaijan with his family moving to Baku, the capital of Azerbaijan, in 1931. He studied at the School of Philology at Azerbaijan State University from 1941 to 1948. During World War II he served at the Transcaucasia front.

In the 1940s, Teymur Elchin was involved in various public activities within municipal and state youth organizations. During this time, he also worked in the local media at radio stations and newspapers, including “Gənc işçi”. By the 1950s, he was named to various government positions where he was in charge of state radio, education and information affairs. From 1957–1964, Teymur Elchin was Chairman of the Azerbaijani State TV and Radio Committee. He later (1964–1975) headed the Department of Ideology of the Central Committee, and from 1975-1988 was Deputy Minister of Culture. He was elected numerous times to the Azerbaijani Supreme Soviet (parliament). Teymur Elchin was a Member of the Union of Writers, and a Member of the Union of Journalists.

His tenure as the first head of the Azerbaijani State TV and Radio Committee left a distinct imprint in the development of national mass media. He was one of the founders of Azerbaijan's television policy.

Parallel to his successful government career was the fame he achieved as an Azerbaijani poet in his own right, and as a translator of poetic works. His first verses were published in 1938, with his children's poetry becoming very popular. He also translated many works of Russian poets, including Korney Chukovski and Samuil Marshak. He wrote several plays which were staged at Azerbaijani national theaters and abroad, in Hungary, Germany, and Spain.

Teymur Elchin authored the lyrics of many well-known songs, and worked with many famous Azerbaijani composers, including Fikret Amirov, Tofig Guliyev, Rauf Hajiyev. In 1989 Teymur Elchin wrote the poem “Garabakh shikestesi” (Qarabağ şikestesi) for which the Azerbaijani composer Vasif Adigezalov wrote a symphony and an oratorio.

Teymur Elchin received many awards for his literary works and governmental leadership, including the Medal of Red Labour Flag (1971), the Order of Shohret (Honour) (1979) and the State Award (1990).

== Books ==
- 1.Qarqız. Bakı: Uşaqgəncnəşr, 1955, 15 səh.
- 2.Bip-bip. Bakı: Uşaqgəncnəşr, 1959, 31 səh.
- 3.Qulaq asın, danışım. Bakı: Uşaqgəncnəşr, 1959, 67 səh.
- 4.Qızulduz. Yaşar və Nur nənə. Bakı: Uşaqgəncnəşr, 1962, 32 səh.
- 5.Din-dan. Bakı: Azərnəşr, 1964, 16 səh.
- 6.Bahar, adlar, uşaqlar. Bakı: Azərnəşr, 1966, 112 səh.
- 7.Sözlər, nəğmələr, nağıllar, laylalar. Bakı: Gənclik, 1969, 79 səh.
- 8.Laylalar. Bakı: Gənclik, 1971, 15 səh.
- 9.Şəkərim, duzum. Bakı: Gəncik, 1977, 224 səh.
- 10.Xoruzbanı gedirəm. Bakı: Gənclik, 1978, 14 səh.
- 11.Torağayın nəğməsi. Bakı: Yazıçı, 1979, 202 səh.
- 12.Toğrul babanın nağıl ağacı. Bakı: Gənclik, 1982, 62 səh.
- 13.Balaca Aytən. Bakı: Gənclik, 1983, 14 səh.
- 14.Mənim kiçik ulduzlarım. Bakı: Gənclik, 1985, 350 səh.
- 15. Ogul Bugac.

== Translation ==
From Russian

- 1.N.Zabila. Vətənimiz. Bakı: Uşaqgəncnəşr, 1951, 12səh.
- 2.N.Zabila. Yasoçkanın kitabı. Bakı: Uşaqgəncnəşr, 1963, 16 səh.
- 3.N.Zabila. Balaca Marina. Bakı: Uşaqgəncnəşr, 1957, 16 səh.
- 4.A. və P.Barto. Pinti qız. Bakı: Uşaqgəncnəşr, 1957, 16 səh.
- 5.K.Çukovski. Qorxunc tarakan. Bakı: Uşaqgəncnəşr, 1961, 18 səh.
- 6.İ.V.Turgenev. Bədbəxt qız. Bakı: Uşaqgəncnəşr, 1961, 236 səh.
- 7.K.Çukovski. Moydadır. Bakı: Uşaqgəncnəşr, 1962, 22 səh.
- 8.S.Marşak. Usta tikər - usta sökər. Bakı: Azərnəşr, 1964, 16 səh.
- 9.A.Tudoraş. Balaca noxudun nağılı. Bakı: Azərnəşr, 1964, 16 səh.
- 10.K.Çukovski. Milçək-vizilçək, Bakı: Azərnəşr, 1965, 16 səh.
- 11.Gənc Marksın albomundan (xalq nağılları). Bakı: Azərnəşr, 1968, 36 səh.
- 12.P.Voronko. Ən gözəl yer vətəndir. Bakı: Gənclik, 1975, 30 səh.
- 13.K.Çukovski. Aybolit. Bakı: Gənclik, 1973, 219 səh.
- 14.T.Hofman. Şelkunçik və siçanlar padşahı. Bakı: Uşaqgəncnəşr, 1961, 80 səh.
- 15.Ş.Rəşidov. Kəşmir mahnısı. Bakı: Gənclik, 1979, 40 səh.
- 16.K.Çukovski. Milçək-vizilçək. Bakı: Gənclik, 1985, 120 səh.

From Turkish

- 17.N.Zəkəriyyə. Günəşə sevinək. Bakı: Uşaqgəncnəşr, 1967, 30 səh.
