= Baku Eurasian University =

- Type: Private
- Location: Baku, Azerbaijan; 40.4060°N 49.8596°E
- Website: www.baau.edu.az
- Location in Baku, Azerbaijan Baku Eurasian University (Azerbaijan)

Baku Eurasian University (Azerbaijani: Bakı Avrasiya Universiteti), is a private university located in Baku, Azerbaijan.

== Affiliations ==
The university is a member of the Caucasus University Association.
