= Khazar Ibrahim =

Azerbaijani diplomat (born 1978)

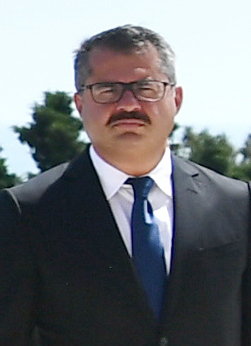

Azerbaijan Ambassador to Turkey
- In office October 5, 2017 – July 26, 2021
- Preceded by: Faig Bagirov
- Succeeded by: Rashad Mammadov

Azerbaijan Ambassador to the United States
- Incumbent
- Assumed office July 26, 2021
- Preceded by: Elin Suleymanov

Personal details
- Born: May 30, 1978 (age 48)
- Citizenship: Azerbaijan
- Education: Baku State University

Khazar Ibrahim (Azerbaijani: Xəzər İbrahim, born May 30, 1978, in Azerbaijan) is the appointed ambassador of Azerbaijan to the United States.

== Education ==
Khazar Ibrahim received a master’s degree in international relations (with distinction) from Baku State University and a master’s degree in security studies (with distinction) from Georgetown University. He attended a senior course at the NATO Defense College in Rome in 2000—2001. He taught the “Foreign Policy of Azerbaijan” class and the “Post-Soviet Azerbaijan politics” seminar at Khazar University in Baku.

== Career ==
A career diplomat, Khazar Ibrahim was appointed as the Republic of Azerbaijan Ambassador to the United States of America on July 26, 2021.

Previously, he served as an Ambassador of the Republic of Azerbaijan to the Republic of Turkey during 2017—2021.

Khazar Ibrahim also served as Head of the Mission of the Republic of Azerbaijan to NATO with the rank of Ambassador Extraordinary and Plenipotentiary between 2011-2017. From 2009 to 2011 he was Deputy Chief of Mission of the Embassy of the Republic of Azerbaijan to the United States of America. In 2007—2009, he was the spokesman of the Azerbaijani Foreign Ministry and deputy spokesman before.

In 2005—2006, he worked at the Political-Military Division of the Foreign Ministry, being directly involved in drafting the National Security Concept of Azerbaijan and implementation of the Individual Partnership Action Plan with NATO. From September 2002 to September 2005, he served at the Azerbaijani Embassy in the United States. His portfolio included political-military, political, and public diplomacy issues.

From 1998—2002, he held several positions at the International Organizations and Security Affairs Departments in the Foreign Ministry, responsible for bilateral political-military relations, NATO affairs, arms control, disarmament, and multilateral security issues.
