= Embassy of Azerbaijan, Washington, D.C. =

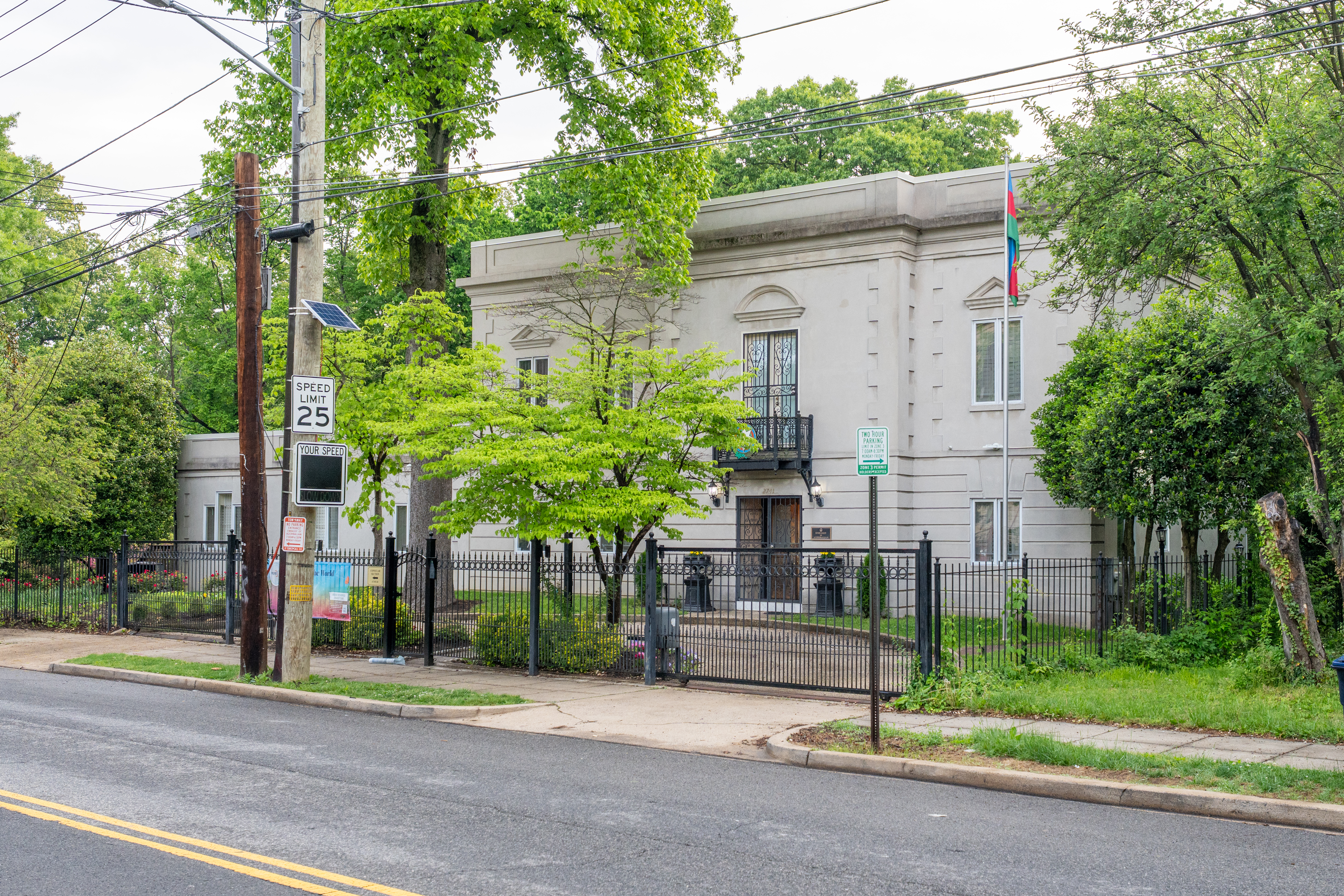
- Location: Washington, D.C.
- Address: 2741 34th Street, N.W.
- Coordinates: 38°55′33″N 77°03′58″W
- Ambassador: Khazar Ibrahim
- Website: http://www.azembassy.us/

The Embassy of Azerbaijan in Washington, D.C. is the diplomatic mission of the Republic of Azerbaijan to the United States. It is located on Embassy Row at 2741 34th Street, NW, NW Washington, DC. The embassy opened on March 6, 1992, after the dissolution of Soviet Union in late December 1991.

The embassy has been the site of protests by Armenian Americans against the Azerbaijani government in 2016, 2018, and 2020. A vehicle was shot at on the grounds in 2022, for which the Azerbaijani government requested the United States investigate.

The chancery is housed in a 1949 building, with a current estimated value of $3,417,500. It was purchased by the Azerbaijani government on March 22, 2000, for $1,595,000. The building is in the District of Columbia Public School District.

== Ambassadors ==
- Hafiz Pashayev (November 1992 – November 2006)
- Yashar Aliyev (November 2006 – October 26, 2011)
- Elin Suleymanov (October 26, 2011 – September 15, 2021)
- Khazar Ibrahim (September 15, 2021 – present)

== See also ==
- Diplomatic missions of Azerbaijan
- Azerbaijan–United States relations
- Azerbaijani American
- Foreign relations of Azerbaijan
