= Armenia lobby in the United States =

Pro-Armenia groups and individuals in the U.S.

The Armenian American lobby is a collection of formal and informal groups and professional lobbyists seeking to influence United States foreign policy in support of Armenia, Armenians or Armenian policies. The purpose and political influence of the lobby has shifted over time, but has included advocacy for Armenian genocide recognition and military support for Armenia.

== History ==
In 1918, the American Committee for the Independence of Armenia (ACIA) was founded by Vahan Cardashian, the former Consul of the Ottoman Empire in Washington. The organization lobbied on behalf of the Armenian Revolutionary Federation (ARF)-governed Republic of Armenia. The ACIA was restructured into the Armenian National Committee of America (ANCA) in 1941.

In 1972, the Armenian Assembly of America was formed as "a new Armenian organization in which leaders from various Armenian groups would participate for the benefit of the community as a whole." The key founding members were contributors to the Armenian General Benevolent Union, the largest remaining non-ARF organization.

In 1982, the ANCA-affiliated Zoryan Institute, a research institute dedicated to scholarship relating to human rights and genocide, was established. The AAA founded the competing Armenian National Institute in 1997, with the goal of raising public awareness of the Armenian Genocide and seeking legal retribution.

== Structure ==
The Armenian lobby is almost exclusively formed by lobby groups and associated think tanks such as the Armenian National Committee of America (ANCA) and the Armenian Assembly of America (AAA), leaving the Armenian government largely out of the lobbying process. The two organizations have similar lobbying goals, mostly revolving around improving U.S. relations with Armenia in terms of aid, blocking aid to Turkey and Azerbaijan, as well as their now-accomplished goal of Armenian genocide recognition. However, the two groups provide different approaches to promoting the Armenian cause. The ANCA focuses mostly on grassroots initiatives to mobilize a highly concentrated Armenian electorate. On the other hand, the AAA focuses on retaining large donations from influential Armenians in America. The AAA draws upon the AIPAC model, which is very much centered on influencing foreign policy. The competition between these two groups creates a "hyper-mobilization" of resources in the Armenian community, because the two organizations have similar goals.

The strength of the Armenian lobby can be derived from its concentration in a few congressional districts, such as California's 30th congressional district. In the 2000 census, one-third of the Armenian-American community lived in just 5 districts of the 106th Congress. Half of all Armenian-Americans lived in just 20 congressional districts. This high population concentration allows the Armenian community to greatly sway votes, especially in a time of low voter turnout. One case study of this is when Democratic challenger and current Congressman Adam Schiff won against Republican incumbent Jim Rogan. Schiff effectively captured much of the Armenian vote, and now current champions Armenian issues in Congress. The Armenian community can also draw on its power of partial assimilation—it is not too assimilated like ethnic groups such as German Americans but it has had a presence in the U.S. since the early 1900s.

== Effectiveness ==
While the Armenian lobby had been effective in a number of public relations campaigns in the late 20th century, it is now almost completely overshadowed by the Turkish lobby which exaggerated the influence of the Armenian lobby to increase its own lobbying efforts.

Some of its achievements in the second half of the 20th century were $90 million in aid annually for Armenia, the continuation of Section 907 of the Freedom Support Act blocking aid to Azerbaijan, success in stalling an arms deal with Turkey during the 1970s, and US recognition of the Armenian genocide. Armenia received the second highest U.S. aid per capita behind Israel.

It failed to discourage the US from reducing its financial aid to Armenia while increased aid to Azerbaijan, at a time when Armenia sent soldiers to Iraq and announced it would send soldiers to Afghanistan in support of the US-led campaign. Furthermore, US diplomats have repeatedly asserted that Armenia has to demonstrate flexibility regarding the Nagorno-Karabakh conflict before Turkey can involve itself.

The Armenian lobby has been subdued by the Turkish and Azerbaijani lobbies. In contrast to the Armenian lobby, the Turkish lobby mostly runs through its government. A study on ethnic lobbies and their effect on U.S. foreign policy indicated that the Turkish embassy is more active than Turkish-American organizations in attempting to influence U.S. regional foreign policy. Because the Republic of Turkey cannot legally finance campaigns, it relies on contracting Washington lobbying firms and contacting members of congress and their staff. In 2008, the Turkish government spent $3,524,632 on Washington lobbying activities and contacted members of Congress 2,268 times. Utilizing top lobbying firms such as the Livingston Group, which has represented other Middle Eastern clients such as Egypt and Libya, the Turkish government gained invaluable Washington resources.

== Lobby organizations ==
- The Armenian American Political Action Committee (A.A.P.A.C.), is a political action committee founded by Albert A. Boyajian.
- The Armenian Assembly of America aims to "strengthen U.S./Armenia and U.S./Nagorno Karabakh relations, promotes Armenia's and Karabakh's democratic development and economic prosperity and seeks universal affirmation of the Armenian genocide" via "research, education and advocacy."
- The Armenian National Committee of America works to initiate legislation on issues of concern to the Armenian American community, such as strengthening Armenia as a secure, prosperous and democratic state; supporting Nagorno Karabagh's right to self-determination and independence within secure borders; increasing U.S. aid levels to Armenia to promote economic and democratic development; securing direct U.S. aid to Nagorno Karabagh; ensuring the appropriate commemoration of the Armenian genocide; and encouraging Turkey and Azerbaijan to lift their blockades and adhere to international standards for human rights and humanitarian practices.

== See also ==
- Armenia–United States relations
- Armenia—USA strategic partnership agreement
- Armenian Youth Federation
- Congressional Armenian Caucus
