= Armenian Youth Federation =

Armenian youth organization

Armenian Youth Federation (AYF) Հայ Երիտասարդական Դաշնակցութիւն
- Founded: 14 January 1933
- Headquarters: Yerevan
- Ideology: Social democracy
- Mother party: Armenian Revolutionary Federation
- International affiliation: International Union of Socialist Youth
- European affiliation: Young European Socialists

The Armenian Youth Federation (AYF) (Armenian: Հայ Երիտասարդական Դաշնակցութիւն) is the youth organization of the Armenian Revolutionary Federation. Founded in 1933, the AYF became a global Armenian organization and stands on five pillars that guide its activities: Educational, Hai Tahd, Social, Athletic and Cultural. The AYF is a full member of International Union of Socialist Youth and Young European Socialists.

== History ==
=== Early years ===
On January 14, 1933, which is marked as the founding date of the Armenian Youth Federation, the ARF Central Committee of America decided to create a national youth organization by combining the existing ones and setting up new chapters where such groups did not exist. After the decision was made, an invitation was sent to representatives of interested youth groups on the East Coast to join a conference on Sunday, July 16, 1933, in the old Hairenik Hall in Boston, MA. The conference was to discuss the unification of the interested youth groups.

Forty youths from the Massachusetts Armenian communities of Boston, Brockton, Chelsea, Lawrence, Lynn, Watertown, Whitinsville, and Worcester were present at the conference. This conference decided to hold a convention in June 1934, at which time the elections of the first Central Executive of the AYF were to be held. They also decided the ARF should appoint a committee of seniors to assist the organization for the coming year.

In the 1933-34 fiscal year many new chapters were formed across the country. It was due to the inspirational teachings of charismatic General Garegin Nzhdeh that AYF attracted thousands of members and supporters during that one year.

Forty chapters were represented during the first AYF Convention that took place at the Hairenik Hall in 1934. It was decided then that the organization was to be named the ARF Tseghagrons (or "young pledgers"), which was concerned with stopping assimilation and instilling the youth with Armenian pride. But the main goal remained to work against Kemalist Turkey and the Soviet Union for the establishment of a free, independent, and united Armenia. The convention also elected the first Central Executive composed of five members. The members of the Central Executive were Hamparsoum Gelanian, John Der Hovanessian, Hagop Hagopian, Arthur Giragosian and K. Merton Bozoian.

Soon after the first Convention, the Armenian Youth Federation expanded north of the border, forming its first Canadian chapter in St. Catharines, Ontario, in 1934.

The Armenian Youth Federation worked to define the organization during its first years. Chapters were organizing programs such as the drum and bugle corps, theater troupes and charity service work like Boston's "Siamanto Santa".

The Armenian Youth Federation, which was often playing the role of an Armenian school, gave priority to its educational program. Each of the forty chapters organized "educationals" on the chapter level. The Central Executive provided lists of educational topics, printed a songbook of Armenian patriotic songs, published the book Highlights in Armenian History, written by the first AYF executive secretary James Mandalian, and produced biographies of historical figures. Chapters would conduct examinations at the end of each fiscal year, the results of which would be sent to the AYF central office to be graded. Individual participation was encouraged by a three-point educational plan, which was conceived by Harry Sachaklian.

In 1935 the AYF established a scholarship fund for worthy and needy students who were pursuing higher education.

One of the centerpieces of the AYF today is the Olympics, which began in 1934 in Brockton and immediately became an annual tradition. The Worcester "Aram" Chapter won every single event at the first Olympics setting an unsurpassable record. Other aspects of the athletic program included boxing, wrestling, baseball, soccer, and basketball, for which numerous inter-chapter tournaments were organized.

=== World War II ===
In 1941, the organization changed its name from the ARF Tseghakrons to the Armenian Youth Federation. This change was necessary because the name "Tseghakrons" was difficult to manage among non-Armenian speakers and it was being maliciously misinterpreted in some quarters. From that point on, the organization in the United States would be known as the AYF.

Life during the Great Depression and Second World War presented many new challenges for the Armenian community in America. Although faced with these additional challenges the AYF was able to continue growing, both in size and nature. The greatest effect of war on the AYF was the entrance of many AYF members into the US Armed Forces.

In 1944–45, it is estimated that over 1000 AYF members were in the Armed Forces. Chapters sent letters, issues of Hairenik Weekly, local news, packages, and presents to members in uniform. Also during this time, the AYF raised a combined total of approximately three quarters of a million dollars in war bonds and stamps. This campaign funded the purchase of a B-25 Mitchell and a B-17 Flying Fortress aircraft for the Allied war effort.

The AYF held a testimonial banquet in Detroit on June 29, 1946, to honor the members returning to the US from the War and to pay tribute to those forty AYF members who had been killed during the war.

During 1942-1946 more than 800 youth joined the ranks of the Armenian Youth Federation. The AYF created the "Song of the Year" program, which helped members learn Armenian National and Revolutionary songs, and organized essay contests, which spurred a good deal of research. Also, the first edition of the well-known AYF "Blue Book" series was published in the 1945-46 fiscal year.

With the end of the World War, AYF activity increased. Members returning from the war provided additional manpower to the organization, but this increase was short lived. The post-war years were followed by an era of declining membership due to geographic and demographic changes in the community. Despite these changes the AYF laid the foundation for another generation of youth. New programs were added to AYF's already wide array of activities, while established programs grew both in size and scope.

=== 1950s ===
During the 1950s the "Blue Book" educational series focused primarily on Armenian History, but also covered geography, culture and customs, the arts, and other subjects. Complete with maps and photographs, these "Blue Books" formed a sound foundation for the educational program.

One of the greatest achievements of the post war years was the creation of the AYF Junior Organization in 1948. The Junior movement soon spread throughout the country and soon rivaled the Senior organization with its own "Blue Book" program, Olympics, conferences, essay and literature contests, and more.

Also ranking as one of the period's outstanding accomplishments was the opening of Camp Haiastan in Franklin, Massachusetts, in 1951. Starting off slowly, and with separate boys and girls sessions, the camp grew gradually throughout the 1950s, becoming co-ed in 1957 and breaking the 50-camper mark the same year.

A year later, the Armenian Youth Federation marked its 25th anniversary with celebrations throughout the US and Canada.

=== 1960s ===
The 1960s were a time of great change and growth for the AYF. By this time, some of the smaller and more geographically isolated communities began to see the beginning of the end as Armenians relocated to other, larger metropolitan areas. The role of AYF forever changed from being a gathering point for local Armenian youth to serving as a substitute for an Armenian lifestyle that was no longer day-to-day.

One of the single biggest changes to occur in the 1960s was the emergence of political activity in the Armenian community. During this time, there were important changes occurring on the Armenian political scene as the 50th anniversary of the Armenian genocide ushered a new era of demonstrative political action, reiterating the demands for just reparations and the return of Turkish-occupied but historically Armenian lands.

=== 1970s and 1980s ===
By the early 1970s, the AYF had become even more dynamic and continued to grow. Some of the larger Junior and Senior chapters held over 100 members.

In 1970, the Armenian Youth Federation Camp was established for members living in the Western Region. For the first couple of years, the AYF rented different locations suitable for summer camp. The AYF Camp Committee decided to acquire its own place in the San Gabriel Mountains. The YMCA Camp Big Pines site happened to be available and very much suitable to the needs of the Armenian Youth Federation, because it was close to the Los Angeles area, and easily assessable to the San Joaquin Valley. In early 1978, negotiations were conducted for a ninety-year lease. The camp was purchased for $80,000.

In earlier years, five regional structures (New England, Mid-Atlantic, Mid-West, California, and Canada) had been created to address the problems brought on by the organization's vast expanse. By the 1970s, however, the obstacles of geography had become overwhelming. The 1973-74 fiscal year saw the split of the AYF into three separate administrative entities: Western U.S., Eastern U.S., and Canada. Later, the Canadian branch dropped the AYF name altogether and became the Armenian Revolutionary Federation Youth Organization of Canada (A.R.F.Y.O.C.).

During the early 1980s, the AYF had largely become a political organization that coordinated events such as hunger strikes and demonstrations to protest against the denial of the Armenian Genocide of 1915 by the Turkish Government and the rest of the world.

=== Modern times ===
In the late 1980s, the AYF added onto its title, and became the Armenian Youth Federation-Youth Organization Of The Armenian Revolutionary Federation (AYF-YOARF). In the early 1990s the AYF found a new challenge: Nagorno-Karabakh. In 1988 the struggle for independence in the Karabagh region started. AYF became involved in fund raising activities to supply much-needed funds to the people in Karabakh. Even after the independence of Nagorno-Karabagh in 1991 and the cease-fire in 1993, the AYF continued to help the region. In 1994 the AYF Western Region decided to create a program, called the AYF Youth Corps, that sent about ten youths that year and continues to send up to 15 each summer. The mission of the Youth Corps is to help rebuild schools, camps, churches, etc. in the various regions of Nagorno-Karabakh.

At the 38th Convention of the A.R.F.Y.O.C. (Canada), a motion was passed regarding the name of the organization. While in Armenian, the name would remain the same, the motion called for an English, as well as a French name, to be added to the constitution. The Canadian organization was henceforth called AYF Canada (Armenian Youth Federation Canada) in English, FJA Canada (Fédération de la Jeunesse Arménienne) in French.

== Present day events ==
The Armenian Youth Federation's calendar is constantly active with social, educational, and athletic events for both junior and senior members. Below is a breakdown of some of these events, focusing on the Eastern Region USA.

=== Senior Olympics ===
Senior Olympics is the Eastern Region's premier event. It takes place annually during Labor Day Weekend, rotating between host chapters in the Mid-Atlantic, New England, and Mid-West regions. Chapters compete over three days in athletic events including track and field, swimming, tennis, softball, and golf. A cumulative winning chapter is announced at the Sunday night grand ball. Canada and West Coast chapters are also invited to participate in the games.

=== National Athletic Tournament ===
NATs is the AYF's annual winter Olympics. Like Senior Olympics, NATs rotates between host chapters in the Mid-Atlantic, New England, and Mid-West regions. The event used to be held in March but was moved to President's Day Weekend to accommodate more games and events. Chapters compete in men's and women's basketball and co-ed volleyball.

=== Junior Seminar ===
Junior Seminar is the AYF's premier junior event. It takes place Memorial Day Weekend and hosts juniors from the Mid-Atlantic, New England, and Mid-West regions with senior members serving as counselors. The weekend consists of age appropriate Armenian themed lectures and educationals, along with night activities and free time.

=== Senior Seminar ===
Senior Seminar is the senior version of Junior Seminar. The event usually takes place in September and features lectures to the organization's senior membership.

=== Convention ===
Convention is the AYF Eastern Region's annual year end meeting and audit. Each chapter in the Eastern Region sends an allotted amount of delegates to present on their chapter's activity. The AYF Central Executive and committees also prepare year end reports to go over and discuss the successes and failures of the organization from the past year. The convention then lay the groundwork for the upcoming year's activity and goals, followed by the election of the new Central Executive.

== Summer programs ==
The AYF has a number of summer opportunities available to membership and Armenian youth in general.

=== Camp Haiastan ===
Camp Haiastan is the AYF's camp, founded in 1951 and located in Franklin, Massachusetts. Campers are aged 8–16 and can become counselors in training at 17 years old, followed by counselors, lifeguards, Armenian School teachers at ages 18 and older.

=== AYF Internship in Armenia ===
The AYF Eastern Region began the Internship in Armenia program in 1992 to encourage Armenians in the Diaspora to visit and volunteer in Armenia. Over the past 25 years, the AYF has sent over 165 participants to the Homeland. The Internship in Armenia program turns the Homeland into a reality by exposing interns to the people and culture of present-day Armenia. Interns are placed in roles specific to their interests to help advance their professional goals while lending their time to their homeland. Interns live together for the summer and tour the country during time off from work.

=== AYF Youth Corps Program ===
The AYF Youth Corps program provides an opportunity for Armenian youth in the Diaspora to establish and strengthen ties with the homeland.

The program began in 1994 after a cease-fire agreement was signed, ending the violence in the Nagorno-Karabakh conflict. Between 1994 and 2007, the AYF sent Youth Corps volunteers to Nagorno-Karabakh to help rebuild many of the war-torn villages in newly liberated Arstakh.

In 2008, the AYF Youth Corps program shifted from rebuilding shattered buildings to operating a summer day camp for underprivileged youth in Gyumri, Armenia's second largest city. With the establishment of the camp, Youth Corps volunteers were able to provide hundreds of children with an unforgettable and productive summer. Since 2011, the program expanded from one location in Gyumri to multiple other campsites across Armenia and Nagorno-Karabakh.

The Youth Corps program is 6 weeks long, with 5 weeks of volunteer work and 1 week of touring. During the first week of the program, Youth Corps participants spend time traveling throughout Armenia, visiting historic sites and enjoying the excitement of Yerevan. The following 5 weeks are spent working as counselors at day camps for underprivileged youth in multiple towns across Armenia and Nagorno-Karabakh.

Through this summer camp experience, campers learn basic English, patriotic songs, arts and crafts.

In addition to volunteering with kids, Youth Corps participants travel throughout Armenia, Nagorno-Karabakh and Javakhk. Participants can expect to visit such traditional sites as Lake Sevan, Echmiadzin, Dzidzernagapert, and Sardarabad, as well as destinations like the ancient Monastery at Tatev, Karahunj and sites throughout Nagorno-Karabakh and Javakhk. As a result, both first time visitors and frequent travellers to Armenia can expect to see something new.

=== AYF Internship in Artsakh ===
In 2018, AYF launched the first program in Artsakh for Armenian youth in order to give Armenian from the diaspora to live and work in Artsakh for six weeks over the summer.

== Chapters ==
Each AYF chapter represents a given geographical region, corresponding to significant Armenian population centers. Chapters traditionally take on nicknames form Armenian history and culture, often place names or national heroes.

=== United States ===
The Armenian Youth Federation of the Eastern United States is divided into three districts: Mid-Atlantic, Mid-West, and New England.

Mid-Atlantic District

City/Region	Chapter
Albany	"Shoushi"
South Florida	"Arev"
Manhattan	"Moush"
New Jersey	"Arsen"
New York	"Hyortik"
Philadelphia	"Sebouh" (Senior) and "Papken Suni" (Junior)
Washington, DC	"Ani" (Senior) and "Sevan" (Junior)

Mid-West District

City/Region	Chapter
Chicago	"Ararat"
Detroit	"Kopernik Tandourjian"
Granite City, Illinois	"Antranig"
Racine, Wisconsin	"Armen Garo"

New England District

City/Region	Chapter
Greater Boston	"Nejdeh"
Middlesex County West	"Musa Ler"
North Andover, Massachusetts	"Sassoun"
Providence, Rhode Island	"Varantian"
Worcester, Massachusetts	"Aram"

The Armenian Youth Federation of the Western United States consists of the following chapters:

City/Region	Chapter
Burbank, California	"Varak"
Crescenta Valley	"Zartonk”
North Valley	"Artsakh" (Senior) and Hrayr Maroukhian (Junior)
Fresno, California	"Kevork Chavoush"
Glendale, California	"Roupen"
Hollywood, California	"Musa Ler"
Houston, Texas	"Dro"
Montebello, California	"Vahan Cardashian"
Orange County, California	"Ashod Yergat"
Pasadena, California	"Nigol Touman"
Phoenix, Arizona	“Kedashen"
San Francisco, California	"Rosdom"
South Bay, California	"Potorig"
West Valley	"Sardarabad"

=== Canada ===
The Armenian Youth Federation of Canada consists of the following chapters:

City/Region	Chapter
Cambridge, Ontario	"Aram Manoukian"
Hamilton, Ontario	"Ararat"
Laval, Quebec	"Pegor Ashod”
Montreal, Quebec	"Levon Shant"
St. Catharines, Ontario	"Haratch"
Toronto, Ontario	"Simon Zavarian"
Vancouver, British Columbia	"Arshavir Shiragian"
Windsor, Ontario	"Keri"

=== South America ===
The Armenian Youth Federation of South America consists of the following chapters:

City/Region	Chapter
Palermo, Buenos Aires	"Arshavir Shiraguian"
Flores, Buenos Aires	"Stepan Dzadhigian"
Valentín Alsina, Buenos Aires	"Soghomon Tehlirian"
Córdoba, Argentina	"Aram Yerganian"
Montevideo, Uruguay	"Misak Torlakian"
São Paulo, Brazil	TRO - Drastamat Kanaian

=== Australia ===
The Armenian Youth Federation of Australia consists of the following chapters:

City/Region	Chapter
North Sydney	"Nigol Touman" (Senior) and “Kaleh” (Junior)
Western Sydney	"Pegor” (Senior) and "Khanasor" (Junior)
Melbourne	"Arapo" (Senior) and "Karekin Njteh" (Junior)

=== Europe ===
The Armenian Youth Federation of France consists of the following chapters:

City/Region
Alfortville
Arnouville
Issy-les-Moulineaux
Lyon
Marseille
Paris
Valence

The Armenian Youth Federation of Greece consists of the following chapters:

City/Region	Chapter
Athens	"Tro"
Piraeus	"Potorig"
Thessaloniki	"Soghomon Tehlirian"

The Armenian Youth Federation of the United Kingdom consists of:

City/Region	Chapter
London	"Khanasor"

The Armenian Youth Federation of the Netherlands consists of:

City/Region	Chapter
Netherlands	"AYF Karekin Njteh"

The Armenian Youth Federation of the Cyprus consists of:

City/Region	Chapter
Nicosia	"Artsakh"
Limassol

The Armenian Youth Federation of Belgium consists of:

City/Region	Chapter
Belgium	"Aram Yerganian"

The Armenian Youth Federation of is also present in the following nations:

City/Region	Chapter
Sweden	Nigol Touman

=== Middle East ===
The Armenian Youth Federation of Lebanon consists of the following chapters:

City/Region	Chapter
Beirut	"Նիկոլ Դուման (Nigol Touman)"
Beirut	"Արշաւիր Շիրակեան (Arshavir Shiragian)"

The Armenian Youth Federation of Iran consists of the following chapters:

Tehran	"Rosdom"
Nor Jugha	"Roupen"

The Armenian Youth Federation of Israel consists of:

Jerusalem	"Rosdom"

The Armenian Youth Federation of Kuwait consists of:

Kuwait	"Kristapor"

The Armenian Youth Federation of is also present in the following nations:

City/Region
Armenia
Artsakh
Syria

== See also ==
- Armenian American Political Action Committee
- Armenian Assembly of America
- Armenian Diaspora
- Armenian National Committee of America
- List of Armenian-Americans
- Little Armenia, Los Angeles, California
