= Armenian American Political Action Committee =

The Armenian American Political Action Committee (A.A.P.A.C.), is a political action committee which advocates for a broad range of issues and concerns of the Armenian-American community. It coordinates its activities with a network of offices, chapters, and supporters throughout the United States and affiliated organizations around the world. It was founded by Albert A. Boyajian. A.A.P.A.C. has also lobbied politicians to secure US aid for Armenian projects.

== History ==
The U.S. Political Action Commission has lobbied for the development and adoption of resolutions on the recognition of the Armenian genocide by the United States.

== See also ==
- Armenian American lobby
- Armenian National Committee of America
- Armenian Assembly of America
- Armenian Youth Federation
- Armenian Diaspora
- Recognition of the Armenian genocide
