= Zartonk (disambiguation) =

Zartonk is an Armenian village in the Armavir province of Armenia.

Zartonk may also refer to:

- Zartonk (Lebanese daily), Lebanese-Armenian newspaper, organ of the Armenian Democratic Liberal Party
- Zartonk (Istanbul daily), Turkish Armenian daily (1932-1933)
- Zartonk (novel), Armenian novel by novelist Malkhas
