= Armenia Ethnography Museum =

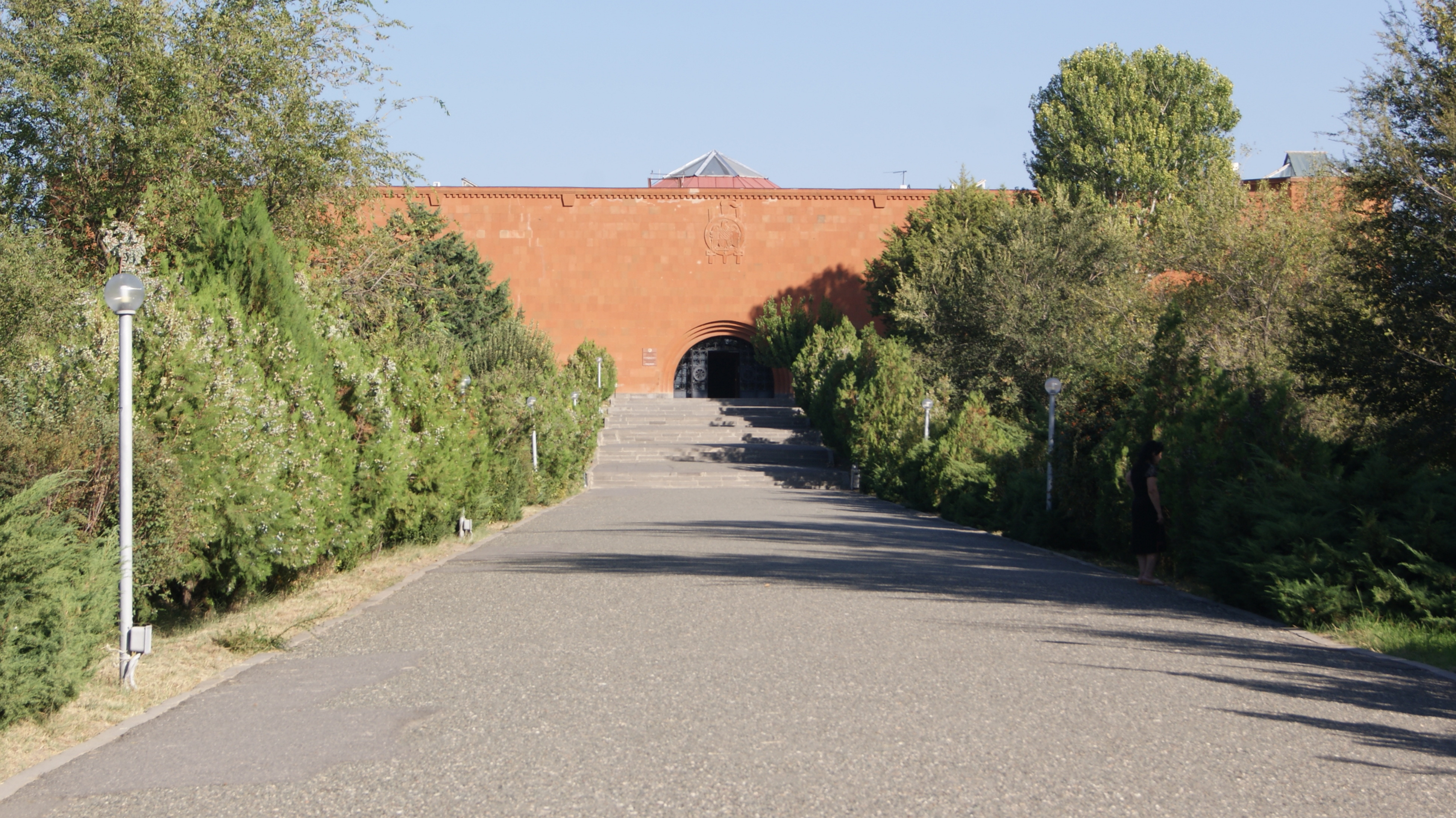
- State Museum of Ethnography of Armenia in Yerevan
- Location: Araks, Armavir Province, Armenia
- Coordinates: 40°08′09″N 44°00′55″E
- Type: Ethnographic museum

The Armenia Ethnography Museum and the National Liberation Movement is a state-owned museum in Armenia, located in the village of Araks, Armavir Province, within the Sardarapat Memorial complex, approximately 10 km southwest of the provincial centre Armavir. Designed by architect Rafael Israelyan, the museum opened in 1978.

== Description ==
The museum building, designed to resemble a medieval Armenian castle, features an exterior without windows. The southern (rear) facade is flanked by two octagonal towers named Aragat and Ararat. Between these towers is a planned two-window opening. The interior design is characterised by smooth tuff-carved arches and walls, adorned with significant symbolic elements.

== Collections ==
The Collection of the Armenia Museum of Ethnography and the National Liberation Movement comprises more than 70,000 items, spanning from the Stone Age to the modern day.

The collection includes:

- Hunting and primitive working tools
- Ceramics, stonework, and unique metallurgy designs
- Petroglyphs
- Household and ritual vessels
- Weapons
- Musical instruments
- Jewellery and other items from early human societies

== Gallery ==
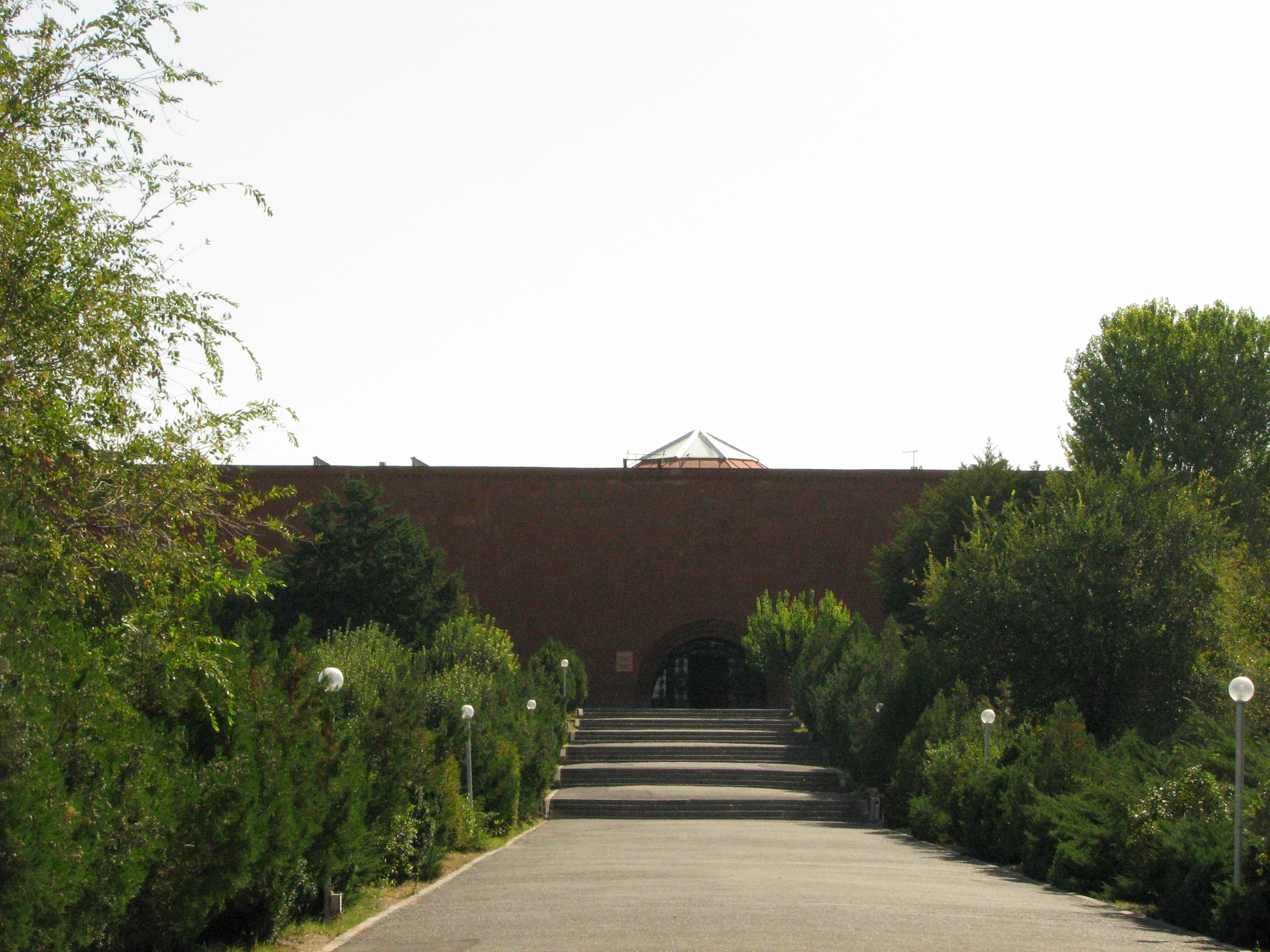

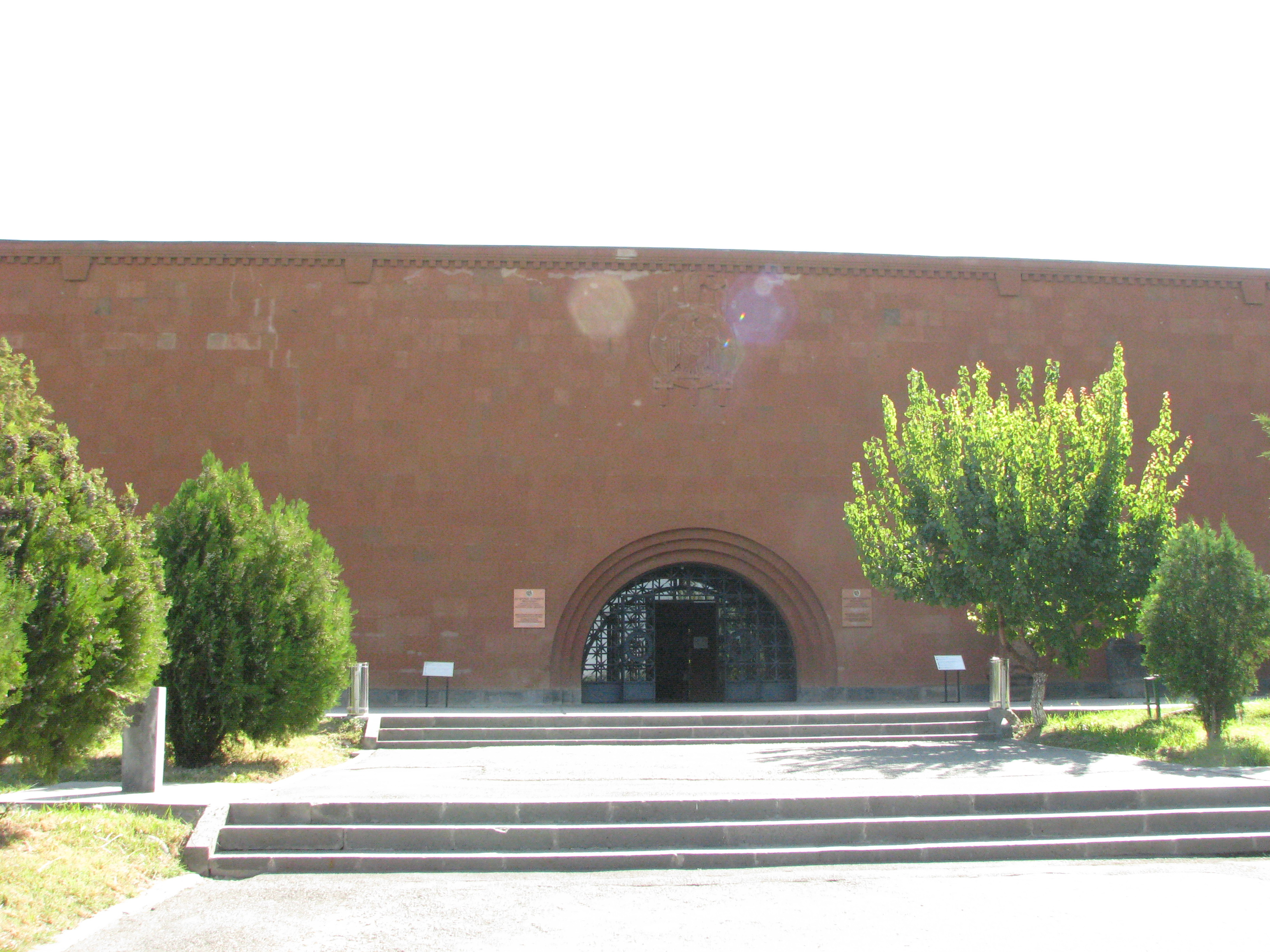

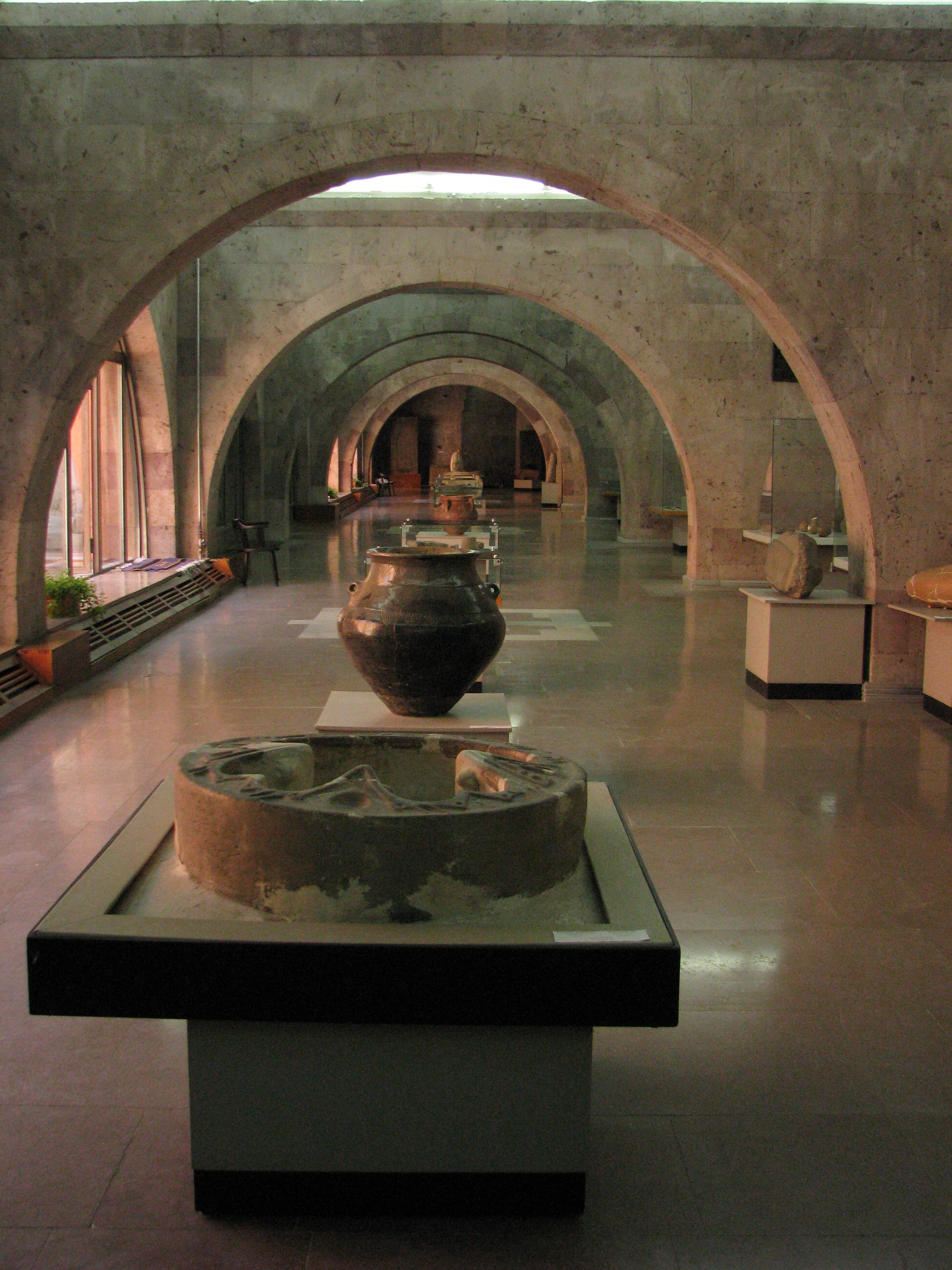

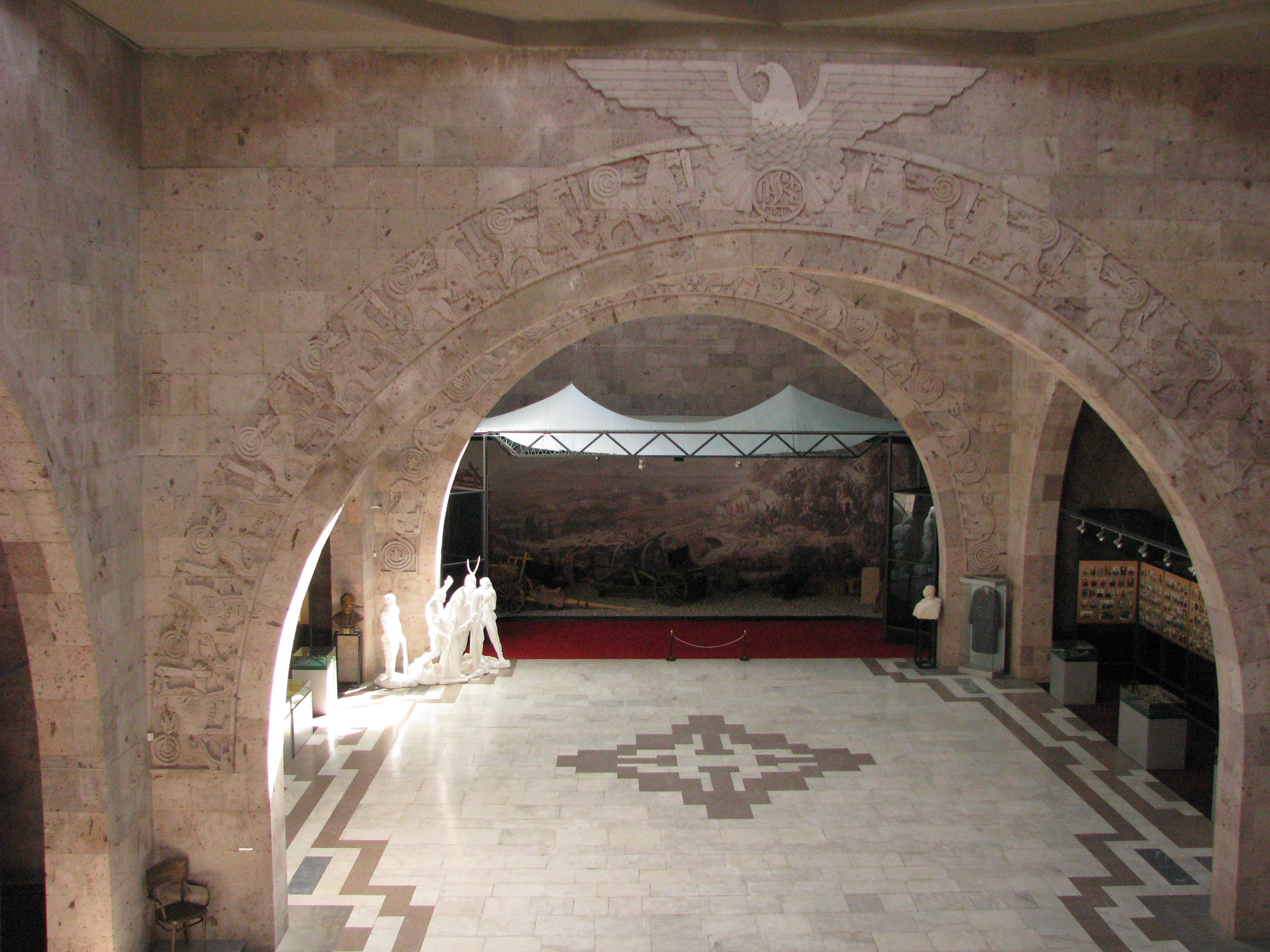

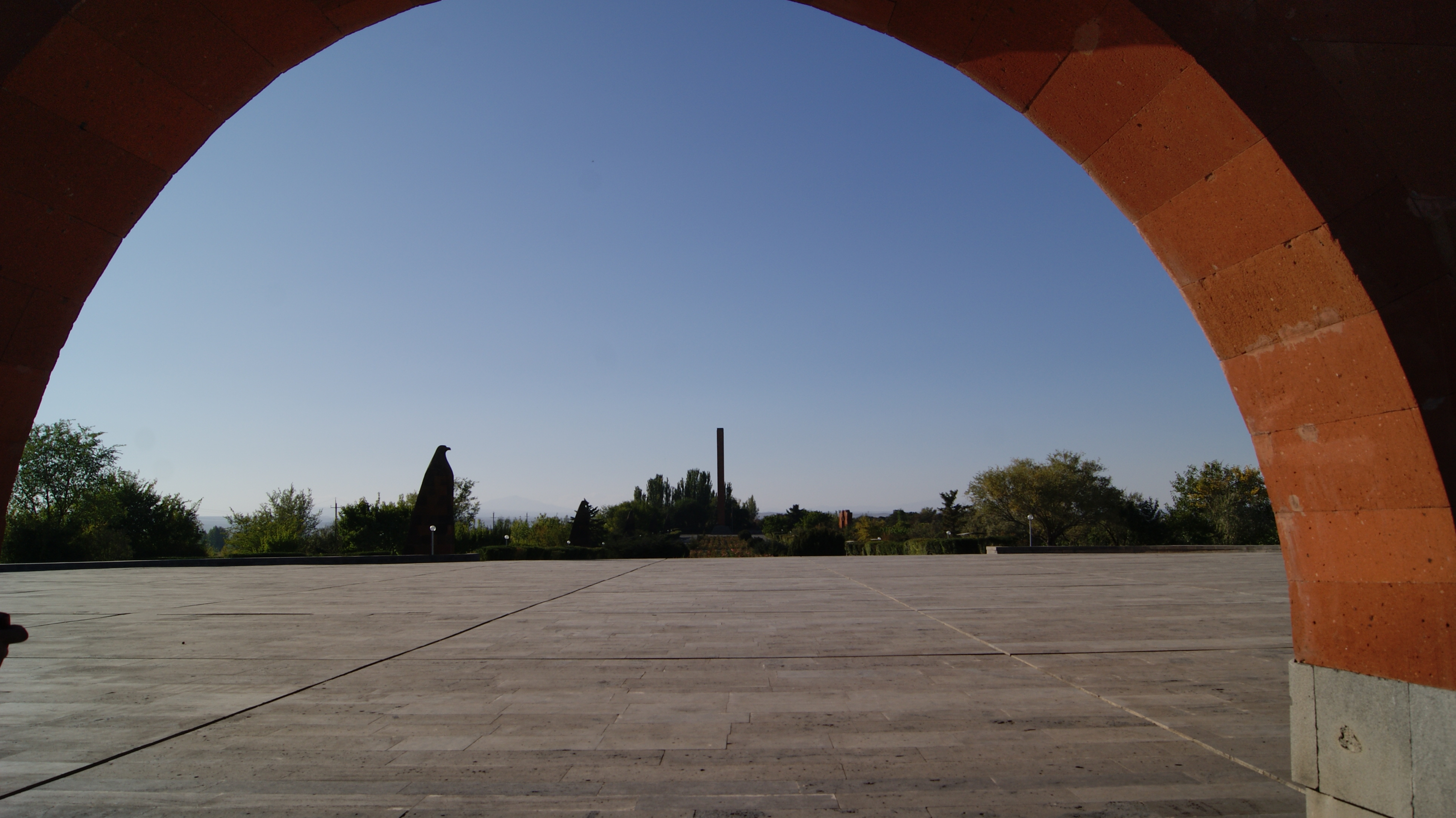

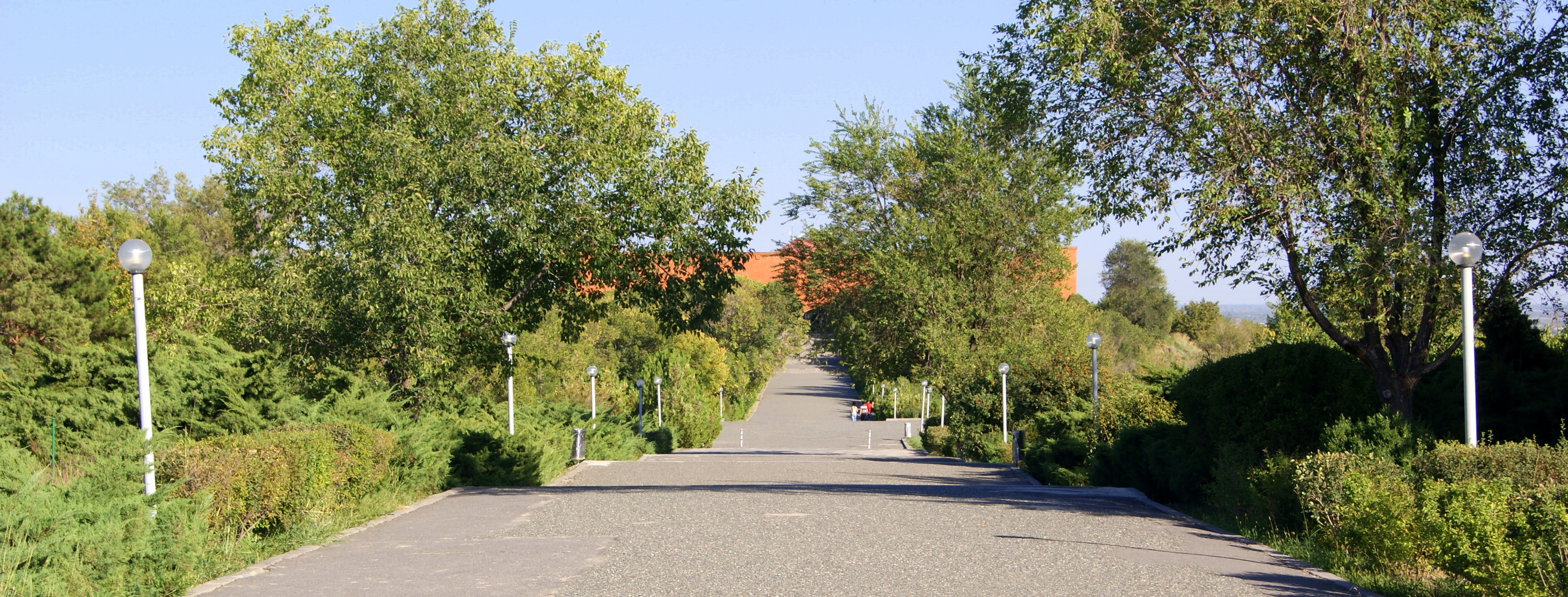

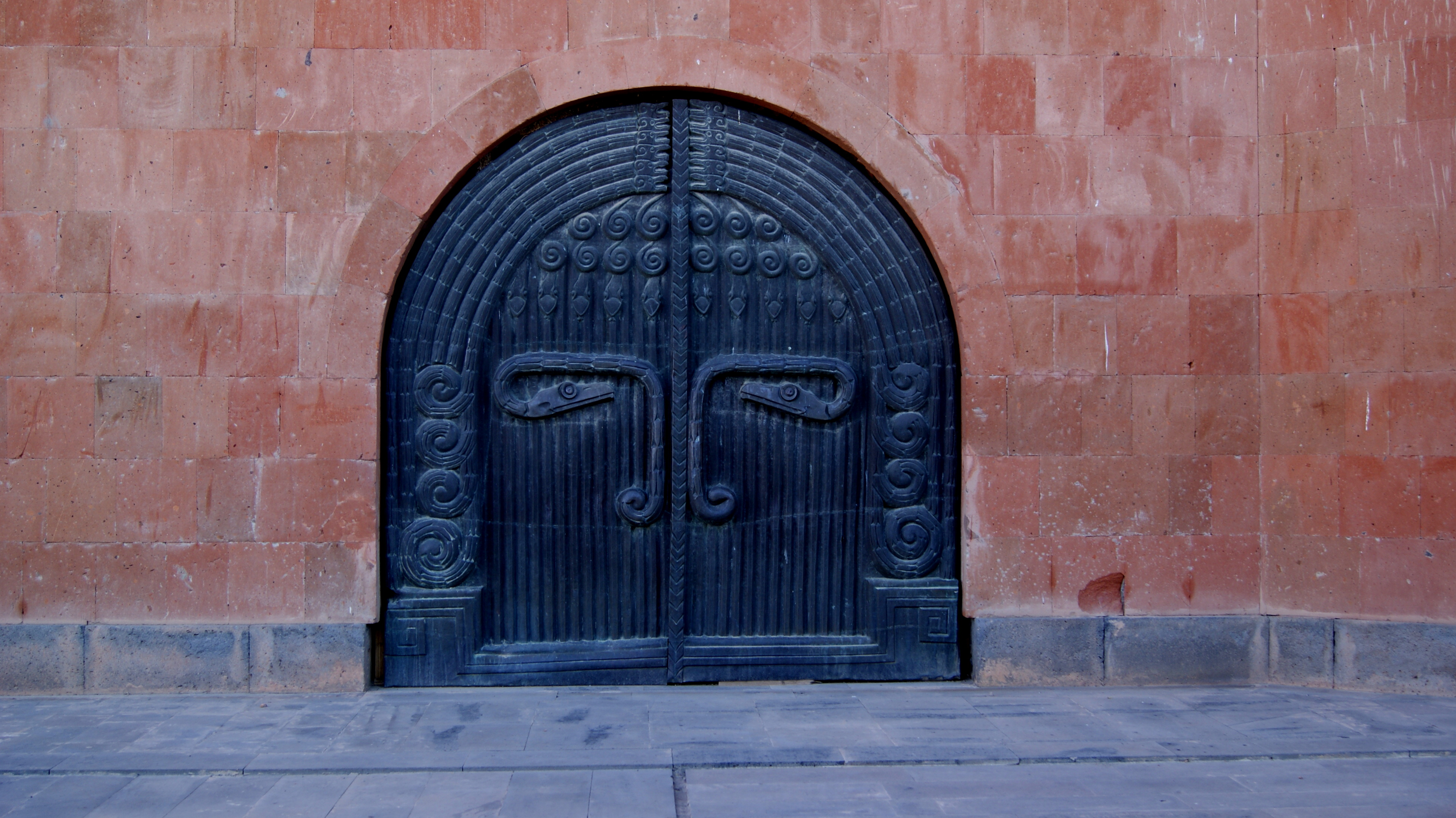

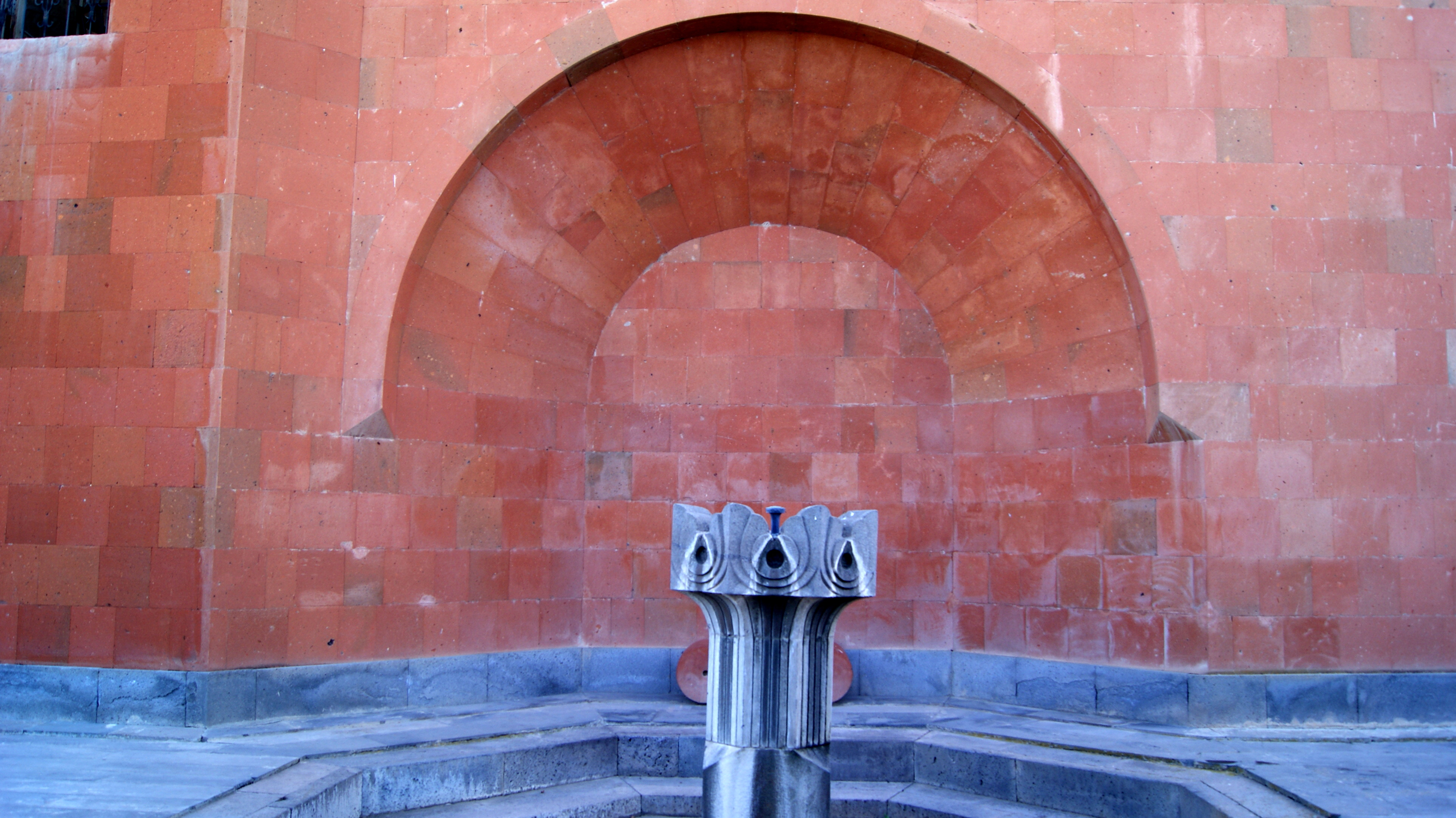

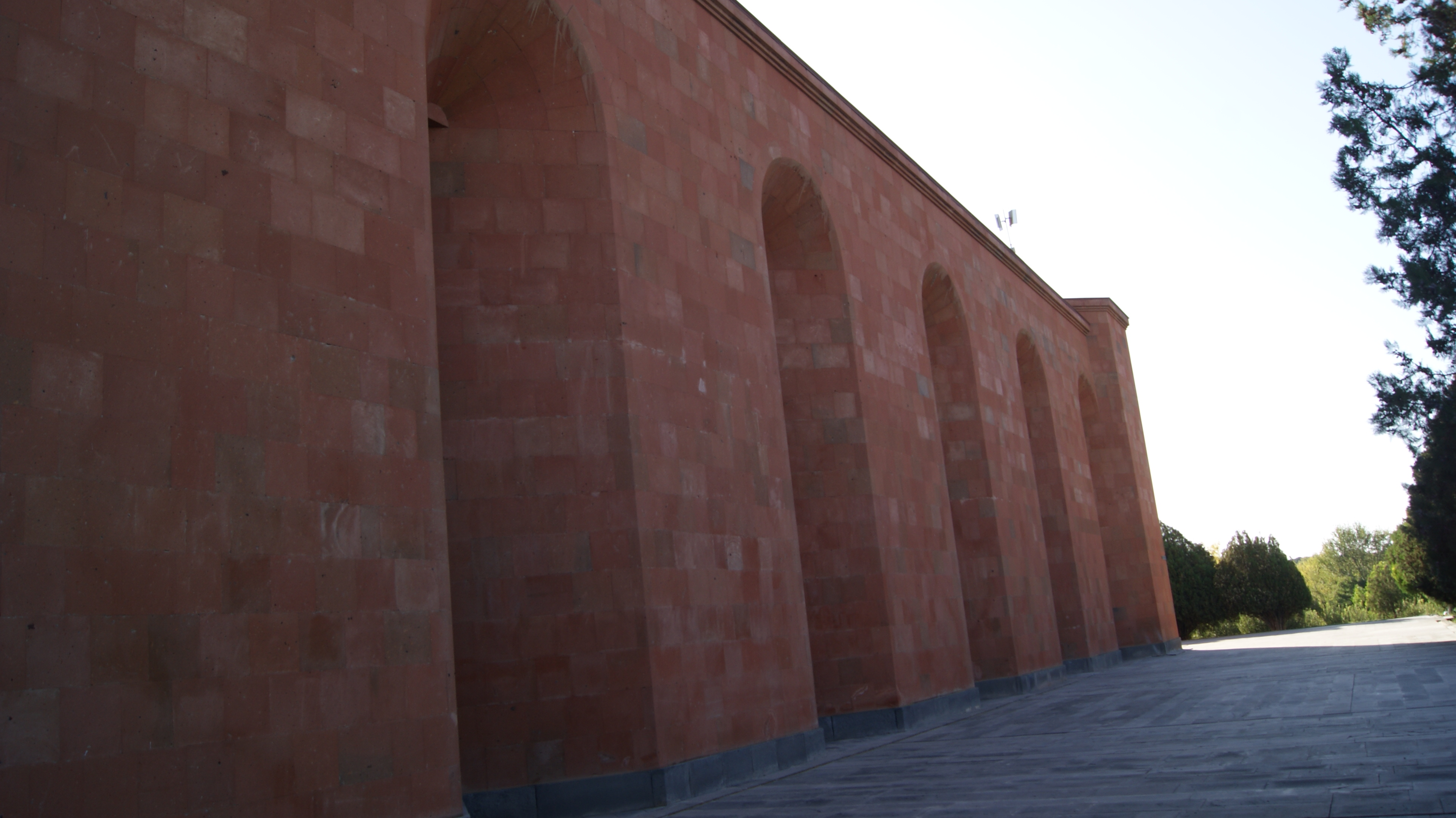

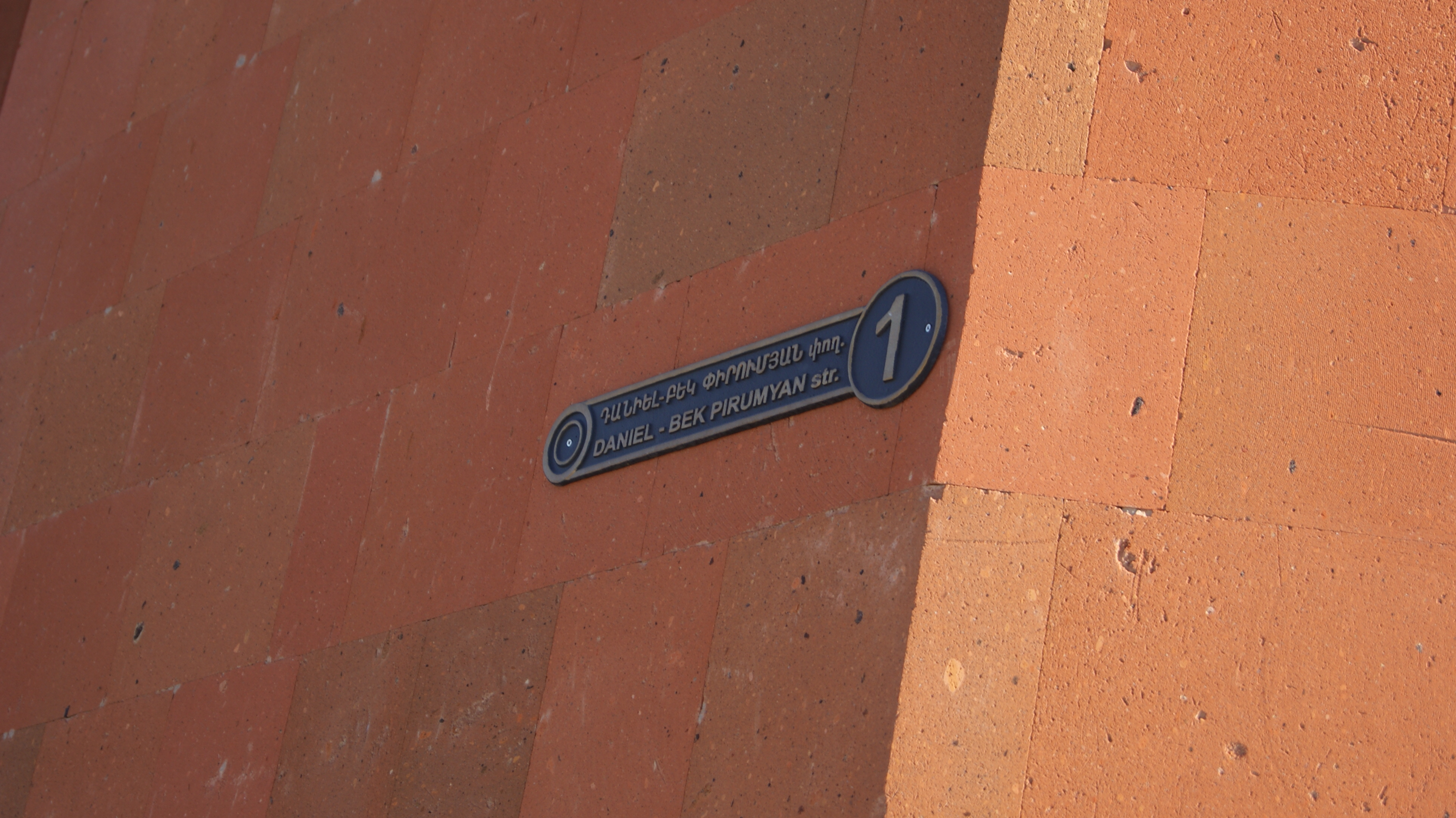

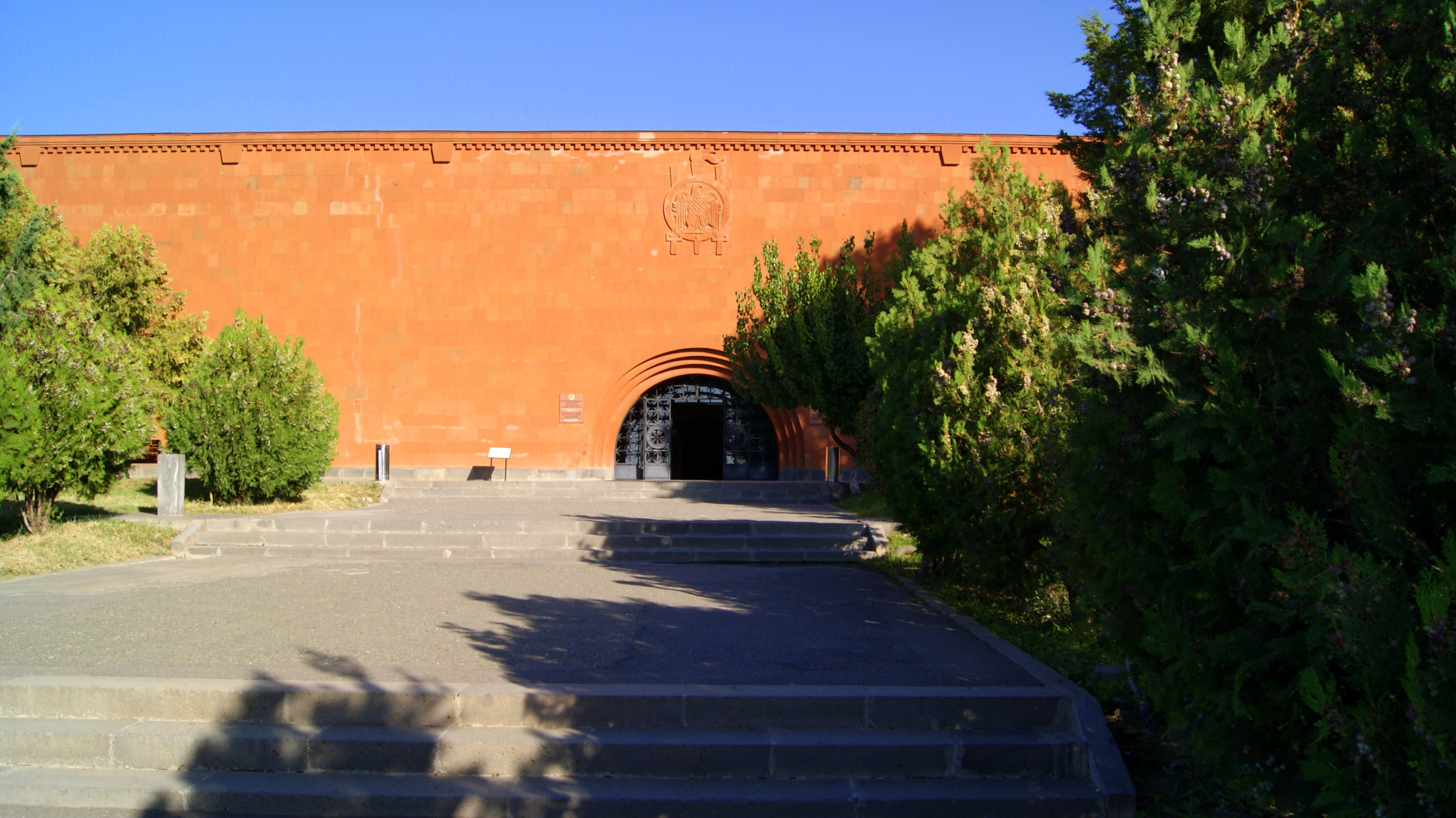

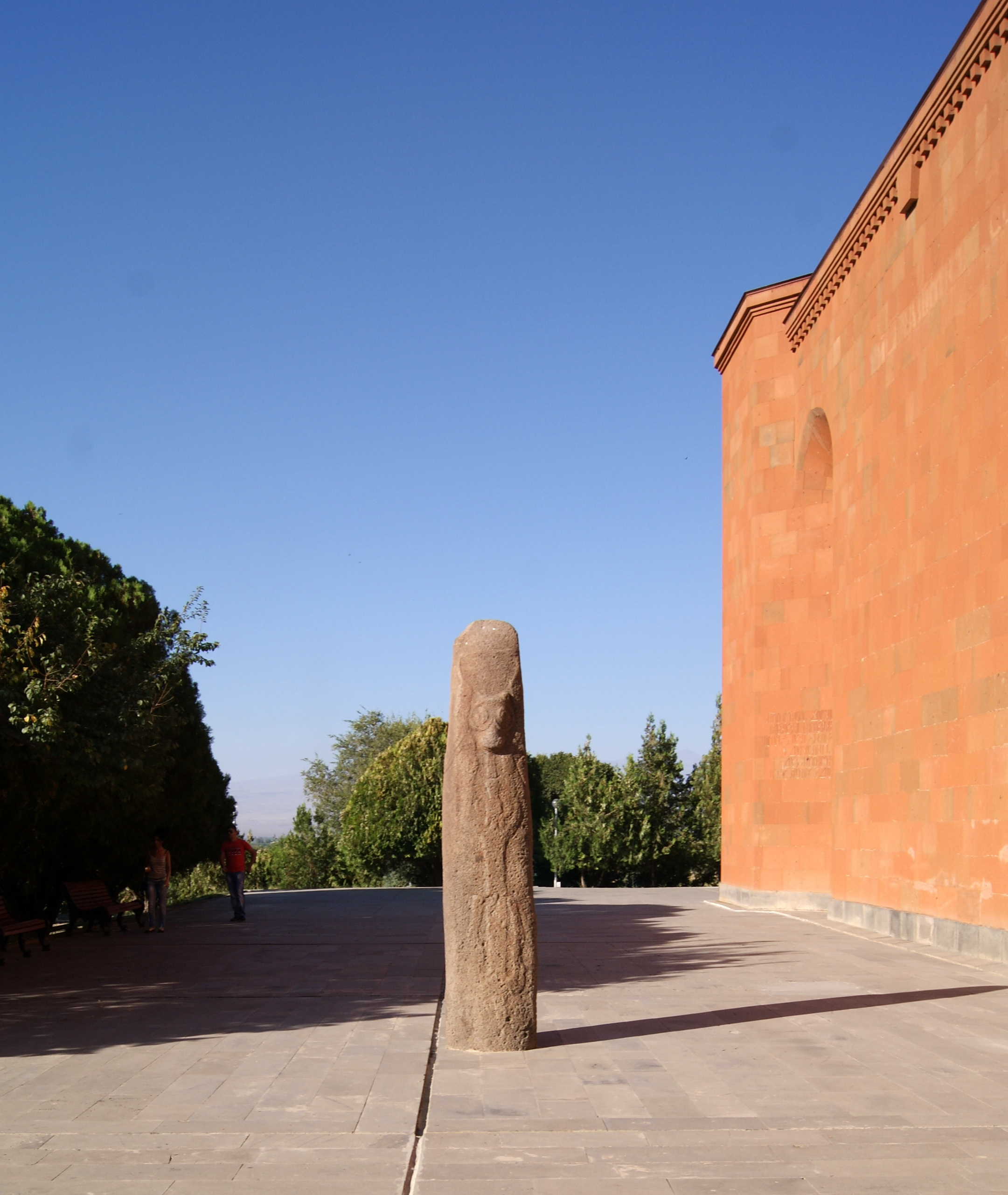

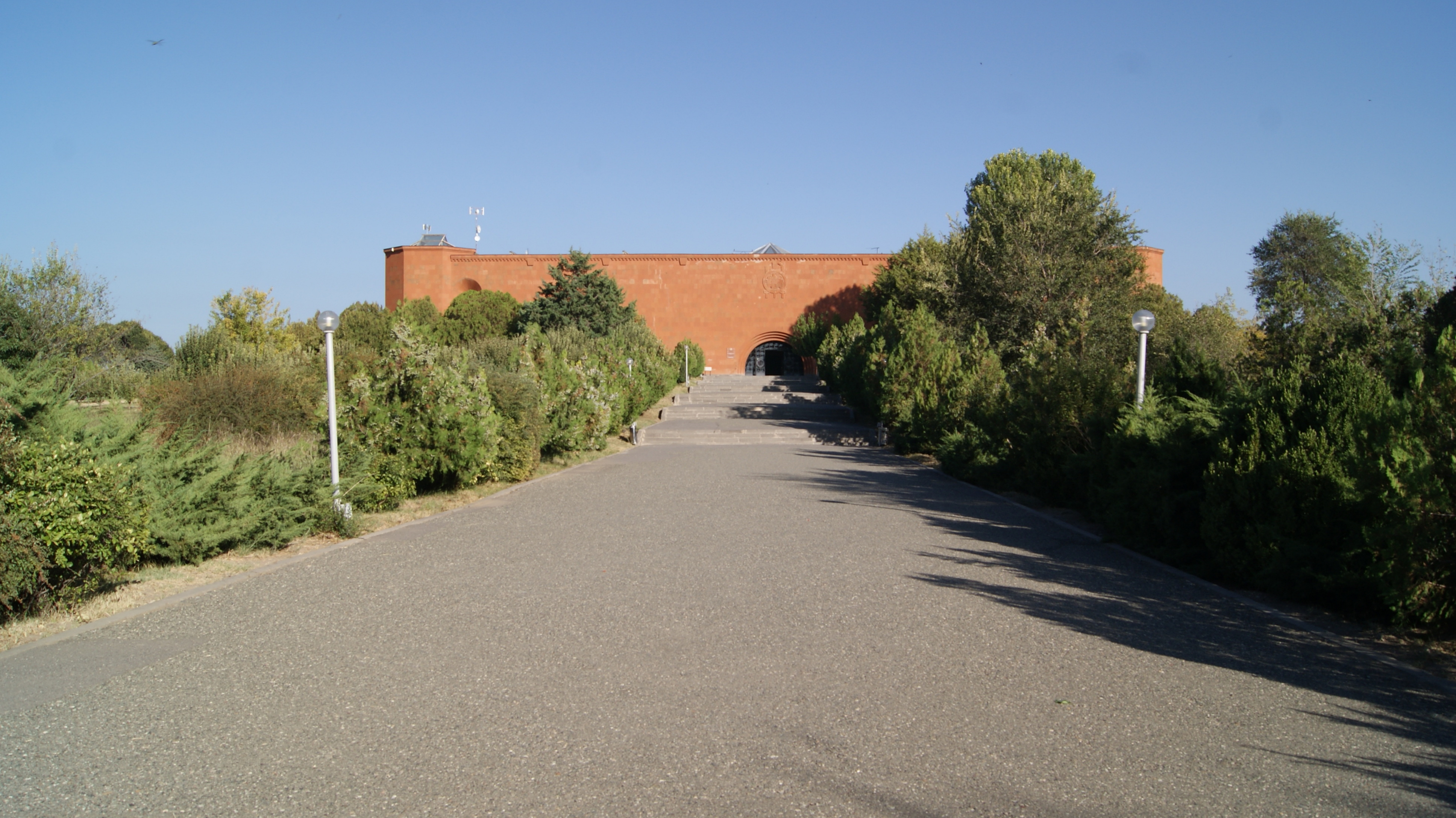

== See also ==
Sardarapat Memorial

== Sources ==
- What is, Encyclopedia, Volume 3, page 25.
