= Armenian Assembly of America =

Armenian advocacy non-profit organization in the U.S.

- Formation: 1972
- Type: NGO
- Headquarters: 1016 16th St NW, Suite 300, Washington, D.C.
- Official language: English, Armenian
- Executive director: Bryan Ardouny
- Revenue: $5.08 million (2023)
- Expenses: $4.73 million (2023)
- Website: www.armenian-assembly.org

The Armenian Assembly of America (Armenian: Ամերիկայի Հայկական Համագումար) is the largest Washington-based nationwide organization promoting public understanding and awareness of Armenian issues. The organization aims to "strengthen the Armenia–United States relations, promote Armenia's democratic development and economic prosperity, and seeks universal affirmation of the Armenian genocide" via "research, education and advocacy." Its headquarters is in Washington, D.C., and it has offices in Glendale, California and Yerevan, Armenia. The organization has consultative status to the United Nations Economic and Social Council (ECOSOC).

== History ==
=== Early history ===
In the early 1970s, at a time when Armenian-American advocacy was dominated by the Armenian Revolutionary Federation-aligned Armenian National Committee of America, the Armenian Assembly of America was created in Washington, D.C. as a non-partisan alternative dedicated to represent and promote Armenian interests. The key founding members were contributors to the Armenian General Benevolent Union, the largest remaining non-Armenian Revolutionary Federation Armenian organization in the United States.

In 1977, the Assembly introduced the Terjenian-Thomas Assembly Internship Program in Washington, D.C., which exposes participants to the Federal policymaking process.

Beginning in 1988 and thereafter, the Assembly addressed the unprecedented challenges of the 1988 Armenian earthquake, the Nagorno-Karabakh conflict and Armenia's independence movement. With Administration support, the United States Congress mandated first-ever earthquake relief funding to then Soviet Armenia.

=== Early years of Armenian independence ===
Annual U.S. assistance became regular during this period, with total funding exceeding $1.4 billion over the following decade. The assembly also played a role in encouraging members of Congress to establish a Congressional Caucus on Armenian Issues The caucus later became one of the larger congressional caucuses and has worked with the Assembly on mattered related to Armenian-American interests.

In 1992, the Assembly lobbied for Section 907 of the Freedom Support Act, restricting aid to the government of Azerbaijan.

The Armenia Tree Project was established in 1993 to assist the Armenian people in using trees to advance their social, economic and environmental recovery. Some 300,000 plantings later, ATP's vision continues to bloom throughout Armenia and Artsakh.

In April 1994, the Assembly established the NGO Training and Resource Center with support from the "Save the Children" USAID fund. The center aims to strengthen domestic Armenian non-governmental organizations (NGOs) in hopes of encouraging wider participation in the democratic processes. The center provides, to more than 300 local registered NGOs, the following services:

- ten-week training program focusing on the leadership and management of the organization;
- technical assistance to help participants implement change within their organization;
- public relations department to raise public awareness about NGO Sector in Armenia and to promote their activities and projects; and
- seminar/workshop series.

Efforts also continued unabated to secure universal reaffirmation of the Armenian genocide, enhanced significantly in 1997 with the launch of the Assembly's Armenian National Institute (ANI). ANI is at the forefront of efforts to affirm the Armenian genocide, responding to denial and advance knowledge and understanding of the Genocide and its consequences.

In 1999, the Assembly started the Armenia Internship Program to provide college students of Armenian descent an opportunity to volunteer for organizations in Armenia. Also that year, the Assembly obtained consultative status to the United Nations Economic and Social Council (ECOSOC).

=== 21st century ===
Assistant Secretary of State for European and Eurasian Affairs Daniel Fried was a major guest at the Assembly's 2006 national conference in Washington, D.C., where he remarked "I value my years of cooperation with the Assembly..."

In 2014, the Assembly, with the aid of several members of the United States Congress, lobbied President Barack Obama to display the Armenian Orphan Rug, which had been in long-term storage.

In 2015, the Assembly hosted several events to commemorate the centennial of the Armenian genocide, including a Helsinki Commission hearing and a panel discussion on the events' portrayal in American media.

In 2016, the Assembly moved to a new headquarters in Washington, D.C. The new location also housed the Armenian National Institute, the Armenian Genocide Museum of America, Diocesan Legate of the Armenian Church of America, and the Office of the Republic of Nagorno-Karabakh in Washington, D.C. Later that year, Republic of Nagorno-Karabakh President Bako Sahakyan awarded the Assembly with a Medal of Gratitude for its "significant contribution in restoring and developing economy, science, culture, social spheres of the NKR as well as for defending and promoting international recognition of the Republic."

In 2017, the Assembly, in collaboration with the Armenian General Benevolent Union, the Armenian National Committee of America, the Children of Armenia Fund, and the Diocese and Prelacy of the Armenian Apostolic Church, launched "The Promise to Educate", a campaign to send copies of director Terry George's 2016 film The Promise and relevant Armenian genocide curriculum resources to public educational institutions across the United States.

Following the 2020 Beirut explosion, the Assembly urged additional American support for Lebanon, with executive director Bryan Ardouny stating that "Lebanon holds a special place in our hearts and minds with its religious, educational, cultural and social institutions all serving the Armenian community and beyond."

In 2022, the Assembly celebrated its fiftieth anniversary at the Jonathan Club in Los Angeles. There, professors Richard Hovannisian and Dennis Papazian, received the Distinguished Humanitarian Award, and Los Angeles's first Deputy Mayor of International Affairs, Nina Hachigian, received the Assembly's Governor George Deukmejian Award for Public Service. Another celebration, in Washington, honored Speaker of the House of Representatives, Nancy Pelosi, with the Assembly's Ambassador Henry Morgenthau Award for her strong support of and leadership on American affirmation of the Armenian genocide.

Actor Joe Manganiello joined the Assembly's 2025 Advocacy Summit in Washington, D.C., and was a keynote speaker at the United States Congress' Armenian genocide commemoration.

== Spending ==
According to OpenSecrets.org, the Armenian Assembly of America allocated the following sums to its lobbying activities:

Year	Allocated ($)
2000	270,000
2001	240,000
2002	140,000
2003	180,000
2004	220,000
2005	220,000
2006	180,000
2007	320,000
2008	182,300
2009	332,510
2010	167,980
2011	177,404
2012	28,681
2013	16,000
2014	30,000
2015	32,000
2016	35,600
2017	45,000
2018	95,000
2019	120,000
2020	90,000
2021	110,000
2022	110,000
2023	160,000
2024	230,000
2025	265,400

== See also ==
- Armenia–United States relations
- Armenian American Political Action Committee
- Armenian-American
- Armenian Diaspora
- Armenian lobby in the United States
- Armenian National Committee of America
- List of Armenian-Americans
- Little Armenia, Los Angeles, California
