= Araks, Armenia (Armavir Municipality) =

Village in Armavir, Armenia

Araks Արաքս
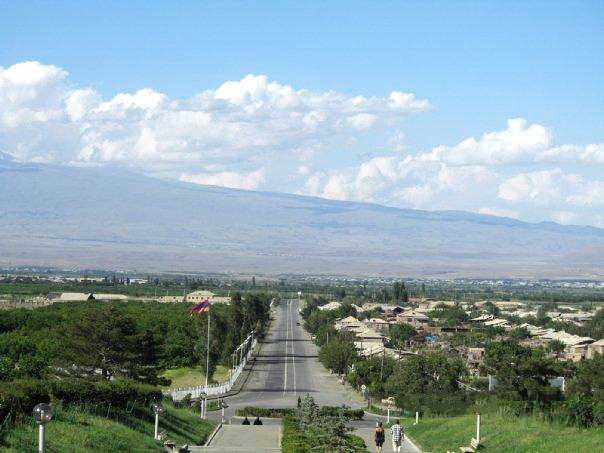
- Araks village as seen from Sardarapat Monument

- Location within Armenia
- Coordinates: 40°05′35″N 43°57′03″E
- Country: Armenia
- Province: Armavir
- Municipality: Armavir
- Founded: 1946

Population (2011)
  - Total: 1,651
- Time zone: UTC+4

Araks (Armenian: Արաքս), is a village with 1,651 inhabitants (2011) in the western part of the Armavir Province of Armenia. It was founded as a state farm in 1940. The Battle of Sardarapat of 1918, took place near the village of Araks. In 1968, the Sardarapat Battle Memorial was erected on the site of the battle. Additionally there is the state owned Armenia Ethnography Museum.

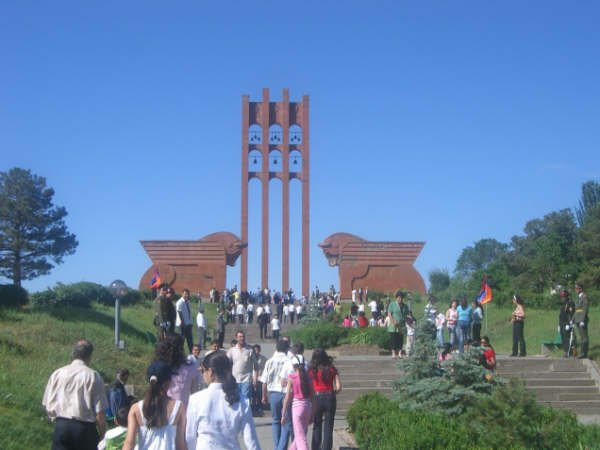
Sardarapat Memorial in Araks
