= Armenia School Connectivity Program =

The Armenia School Connectivity Program (ASCP) is a program which provides training, resources and internet access for schools in Armenia. It is implemented by Project Harmony and funded by the US Department of State Bureau of Educational and Cultural Affairs through the 1992 Freedom Support Act. The program allows the students, educators and community members of Armenia to access and share information. It is meant to increase the U.S-Armenian partnership at the schools and within the community, increase interaction between schools and the community, and civic engagement on the local, national and international levels. The Armenian School Connectivity Program supports the integration of educational technologies that is supposed to strengthen democracy and support civil society and cultural understanding.

== Recruitment process ==
The schools recruited to the ASCP went through a competition completed on October 15, 2004. During the site set-up of the ASCP, local schools were affected by the rearrangements initiated within the framework of the Armenia Education Quality and Relevance Project. The school building maintenance funds increased, becoming higher than the staff/student number involved in the ASCP network; this resulted in some ASCP schools to merge into one another, decreasing the number of schools involved in the network. A program assessment had a few more schools removed from the network for not having an adequate level of participation in the program. In the end, 330 schools were selected from all over Armenia to be a part of the Program network.

The recruitment process for the ASCEP was held under the Program Promotion and Enrollment Competition. Project Harmony announced the launching of the recruitment along with a program introductory highlighting the principals and specifics about the recruitment requirements and process that were distributed to all schools within the region. There was a Q&A session that applicants received; afterwards, possible applicants were given a follow-up consultation meeting with Project Harmony in all of the 11 regions. The selected schools that were part of the ASCP program were chosen based on the following criteria implemented by Project Harmony:

- The principal of the school had to support the program and be willing to share the Internet Computer Center classroom with the community and other schools
- The school's academic background had to meet certain quantitative and qualitative measures
- There had to be a high motivation within the school for academics and administrative staff to use the classroom effectively
- The community was involved in the school activities
- The school participated in any U.S. government programs
- The school participated in any improvement programs organized by either NGOs, the ministry of education, and other related organizations.
- The school's geographic location

== The online scrapbook ==
The online scrapbook is a competition meant to assess the development of the Armenian School Connectivity Program within its first six years running.

== Project harmony involvement ==
The responsibility of Project Harmony (PH) was the long-term sustainability of the program. From the years 2000–2007, Project Harmony completed 3 interrelated school connectivity programs in Armenia. The first program implemented by PH, is referred to as Armenia connectivity 2000 (AC2K), outlined the expansion of Internet access through assessing the information and communication technology needs within the education system.

Project harmony brought together organizations and private donors to invest in ICT projects for Armenia. These projects were meant to help build a demonstration network of 24-internet- connected secondary schools from the city of Yerevan and a few regions close to the capital. This led to two following grants in support of the Armenia School Connectivity Program, eventually reaching across Armenia, and creating a network of 330 secondary schools with an Internet Computer Center (ICC). The program hired and appropriately trained approximately 600 ICC staff. The people responsible for the ICC program created outreach activities and information literacy programs for the local community. For the isolated and under-served communities of Armenia, project harmony expanded Internet accessibility through the Mobile Internet Lab project. The purpose of the Mobile Internet Lab was to ride through Armenia, offering basic computer and Internet literacy to the school and community members in remote villages. The Mobile Internet Lab was an altered flatbed truck with 5 workstations, a printer, a scanner, and a digital camera and satellite connection.

== Official transfer ==
In May 2007, Project Harmony announced the final step to officially transfer the Armenian School Connectivity Program from the U.S government to the Government of Armenia. From the years 2005–2007, Project Harmony and the Armenian government worked together on the transfer of the ASCP to the Ministry of Education and Science. The Ministry of Education and Science, a financial co-sponsor of the ASCP sought to adopt the ASCP infrastructure and the systems and strategies employed to deliver ICT-enhanced educational activities. The completion of the transfer was anticipated on June 30, 2007. Until then, Project Harmony is responsible for sustaining the ASCEP. The National Center for Educational Technologies (NCET) was authorized the responsibility of completing the agency after the official transfer on July 1, 2007.
