= Rouben Paul Adalian =

Armenian historian

- Occupation: Director of the Armenian National Institute

Rouben Paul Adalian is the Director of the Armenian National Institute in Washington, D.C., and a professor at the Elliott School of International Affairs of George Washington University and at Johns Hopkins University.

== Career ==
Adalian received his PhD in history from the University of California, Los Angeles in 1987; his dissertation focused on Nicholas Adontz.

He is the author of many scientific works and articles, including Historical Dictionary of Armenia and From Humanism to Rationalism: Armenian Scholarship in the Nineteenth Century, where Adalian "has provided a useful overview of an important topic which has not received its just attention in the English language". In his review of the Historical Dictionary of Armenia, Ladis K.D. Kristof wrote that it is "highly successful in providing us with a broad and reliable socio-historical background to the politically still quite unsettled and economically devastated present day Armenia."

He is the editor of Armenia and Karabagh Factbook, and associate editor of award-winning Encyclopedia of Genocide.
