= Bekor Ashot =

Armenian military officer

- Born: Ashot Ghulyan; 6 October 1959; Baku, Azerbaijan SSR, Soviet Union
- Died: 24 August 1992 (aged 32); Kichan, near Mardakert, Republic of Artsakh
- Military career
- Allegiance: Armenian Revolutionary Federation Armenia; Nagorno-Karabakh
- Service years: 1991–1992
- Rank: Commander
- Nickname: Bekor (Shard)
- Conflicts: First Nagorno-Karabakh War; Capture of Shusha
- Awards: Hero of Artsakh; Military Cross; Liberation of Shushi medal

Ashot Ghulyan (Armenian: Բեկոր Աշոտ; 6 October 1959 – 24 August 1992), also known as Bekor (Shard), was an Armenian military leader during the First Nagorno-Karabakh War. He was awarded the Hero of Artsakh honorary title.

== Biography ==
Being a worker from Stepanakert, he dedicated himself to the movement for self-determination of Nagorno-Karabakh since the late 1980s. He was an underground activist and partisan leader of self-defense movement. In 1991 Bekor was wounded in Hadrut region, then participated during the captures of Khojaly and Shushi.

Bekor fought in a number of battles in Askeran, Hadrut, Shahumyan, Karkijahan, Verin Shen, Dashalty, Lachin and several others.

He was first to enter Shushi in 1992 after its capture. His friend, Armen Danielyan, said that as a commander Bekor was very attentive to the needs of all the men. A school in the Republic of Artsakh is named after him.

== Awards ==
- Military Cross
- Liberation of Shushi medal
