= Armenian National Committee of America =

Armenian-American advocacy non-profit organization

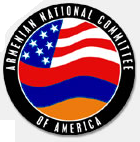
- Formation: 1918 (as ACIA); 1941 (as ANCA)
- Type: NGO
- Headquarters: 1711 N Street NW, Washington, D.C.
- Official language: English, Armenian
- Executive director: Aram Hamparian
- Chairman: Raffi Hamparian
- Website: www.anca.org
- Formerly called: American Committee for the Independence of Armenia (ACIA)

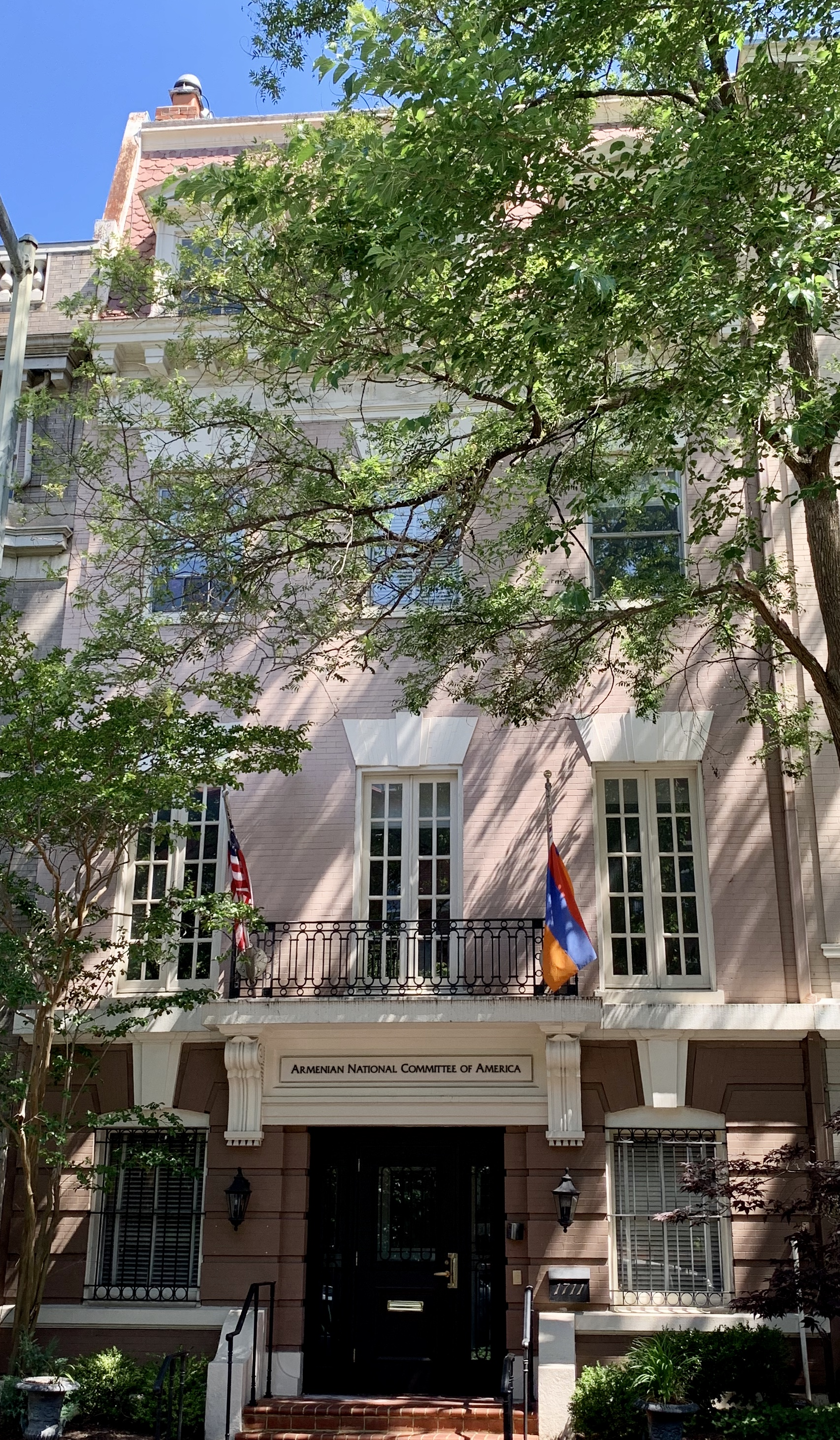
Armenian National Committee of America headquarters in Washington, D.C.

The Armenian National Committee of America (ANCA) (Armenian: Ամերիկայի Հայ դատի յանձնախումբ) is an Armenian American grassroots organization. Its headquarters is in Washington, D.C., and it has regional offices in Glendale, California, and Watertown, Massachusetts.

== History ==
The ANCA was founded as ACIA in 1918 and was then founded as the ANCA in 1941. The ANCA is an outgrowth of the American Committee for the Independence of Armenia (ACIA) which was founded after World War I by Vahan Cardashian, the former Consul of the Ottoman Empire in Washington. Many prominent American and Allied leaders including James W. Gerard, the U.S. Ambassador to Germany, Senator Henry Cabot Lodge, Charles Evans Hughes (later appointed Chief Justice of the U.S. Supreme Court), Elihu Root and others participated to this organization. The goal of ACIA was the independent Wilsonian Armenia. The ACIA had a Central Office in New York City and 23 regional offices in 13 states.

Later, these offices gradually evolved into the Armenian National Committee of America, which expanded its activities to include public relations efforts to acquaint local communities about Armenian issues including the Armenian genocide and Armenian National aspirations. Other activities included April 24 commemoration activities, public forums, voter registration efforts, support for local and state political candidates, and updating the local community on Armenian issues.

The ANCA is active in different areas of political and educational activities, including:

- initiating the legislation on issues of concern to the Armenian American community, such as strengthening Armenia as a secure, prosperous and democratic state. Furthermore it advocates for the expansion of the Armenian state's borders as in accordance with the Treaty of Sevres. Additionally it supports Nagorno Karabakh's right to self-determination and independence within secure borders; etc.
- participation in the American electoral process at the federal, state, and local levels by educating elected officials about Armenian American issues and providing Armenian American voters with up-to-date information about the positions of candidates on Armenian American concerns.
- publication of congressional testimony, position papers, press releases, fact sheets, and regional newsletters.

Beyond the national headquarters of the ANCA located in Washington, there are two regional offices in New York City and Los Angeles, and more than fifty local chapters and thousands of activists, it is cooperating with a large web of regional Armenian National Committees (or Armenian Cause/Hay Tad Offices) in Armenia, Russia, France, the Middle East, Canada, South America, and Australia.

The ANCA has ties to the Armenian Revolutionary Federation.

=== 1990–1999 ===
Since the early 1990s, the ANCA has defended Section 907 of the Freedom Support Act, restricting aid to the government of Azerbaijan.

=== 2000–2009 ===
The ANCA was among the major organizations backing US House Resolution 106 which called for the United States to recognize the Armenian genocide committed by the Ottoman Empire during World War I.

=== 2010–2019 ===
In 2014, ANCA-WR celebrated the California Senate's recognition of the Republic of Artsakh, with then-Executive Director Elen Asatryan stating "This resolution couldn't have come at a better time, given the recent escalated level of violence along the Artsakh-Azerbaijan border, and as our freedom fighters continue to defend their right to live under a government of their own choosing."

In 2017, the ANCA, in collaboration with the Armenian Assembly of America, the Armenian General Benevolent Union, the Children of Armenia Fund, and the Diocese and Prelacy of the Armenian Apostolic Church, launched "The Promise to Educate" campaign to send copies of director Terry George's 2016 film The Promise and relevant Armenian genocide curriculum resources to public educational institutions across the United States.

On 25 May 2017, the ANCA issued a statement against Donald Trump's budget, which would cut 69.6% of the aid to Armenia. The ANCA stated: "We are troubled by Trump's ill-advised and misguided proposal to cut aid to Armenia."

=== 2020–present ===
==== 2022 Los Angeles City Council scandal ====
Following the 2022 Los Angeles City Council scandal, ANCA-WR's official response stated:

As victims of genocide, and targets of systemic racism and persecution for generations based on our ethnic and religious identity (including an ongoing Armenophobia campaign sponsored by Azerbaijan), the Armenian-American community is all too familiar with the unspeakable damage caused by continued animosity against any ethnic or racial group. Los Angeles is home to a rich and diverse population of communities from across the globe who came to Los Angeles seeking safety, opportunities, and a place of belonging in a city which strives to include all people. Such comments have no place in our city, and as Angelenos, we stand alongside all communities in their ongoing fight against hate, and we must relentlessly oppose any holder of public office who fails to join this fight with their words and actions.

==== 2022 United States elections ====
For the 2022 Los Angeles mayoral election, ANCA-WR endorsed Karen Bass for mayor. In response, Bass stated "The Armenian community deserves a Mayor who will prioritize issues that are often overlooked. For the past few decades, I have worked to hold Azerbaijan accountable and support the people of Artsakh. I have fought to combat anti-Armenian hate, and ensured that I have Armenian representation in senior staff roles in my elected offices. The work that ANCA-Western Region does is incredibly important in fighting for the best interests of the Armenian community and as Mayor, I vow to continue to help in that fight." Following Bass' victory, Nora Hovsepian, the chair of the ANCA-WR board of directors, was named to serve on the transition team.

== Positions and activities ==
=== Support for Artsakh ===
ANCA has a policy of generating increased U.S. support for the security and prosperity of the independent Republic of Artsakh, through initiatives challenging Azerbaijan’s aggression, strengthening U.S.-Artsakh ties, appropriating direct U.S. aid, and supporting the OSCE Minsk Group’s efforts to resolve the Artsakh-Azerbaijan status and security issues.

=== U.S.–Armenia ties ===
ANCA works to improve the strategic U.S.–Armenia partnership in terms of expanding trade; increasing aid; further developing mutually-beneficial political, economic, security, military, and peacekeeping cooperation; and elevating the frequency of bilateral visits at both head of state and government levels.

=== LGBTQ+ rights ===
At a 2010 GALAS LGBTQ+ Armenian Society conference, entitled "Breaking Through: Legally, Politically, Culturally," ANCA participated in a panel discussion focused on political issues important to the Armenian and LGBT communities, ANCA Chairman Raffi Hamparian stated:

The Armenian American community is a broad and diverse entity and one where all voices should be welcomed and heard. The political activism needed to advance justice with respect to the Armenian Genocide and Artsakh is needed from all segments of our community. That means we need the involvement of everyone in our community; young and old, rich and poor, those with a college degree and those with none, those who are gay and those who are straight, or those who were born in America or those who came to this country as immigrants. The rainbow of diversity in our community is a strength, not a weakness. We need to seize our diversity to advance our common cause for justice. This I believe.

== See also ==
- Armenia–United States relations
- Armenian Assembly of America
