= Armenian National Institute =

American nonprofit organization

Coordinates: 38°53′53.3″N 77°1′52″W

- Abbreviation: ANI
- Formation: 1997
- Location: Washington, D.C.
- Director: Rouben Paul Adalian
- Website: www.armenian-genocide.org

The Armenian National Institute (ANI) is a Washington, D.C.–based organization dedicated to the research and documentation of the Armenian genocide. It was founded in 1997 by the Armenian Assembly of America to bring more awareness to the Armenian genocide. The abbreviation of the institute, ANI, is the name of the medieval capital of Armenia.

== See also ==
- Armenian genocide recognition
