= Vahan Cardashian =

American lawyer

- Վահան Քարտաշեան
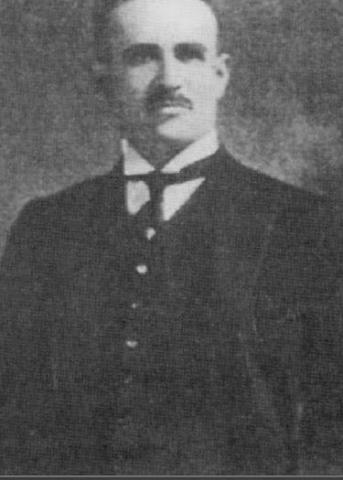
- Born: December 1, 1882; Caesarea, Ottoman Empire (present-day Kayseri, Turkey)
- Died: June 11, 1934 (aged 51)
- Education: Yale University
- Occupation: Public activist
- Organization: ANCA

Vahan Cardashian (Armenian: Վահան Քարտաշեան; December 1, 1882 – June 11, 1934) was an Armenian-American political activist and lawyer.

== Biography ==
Born in the city of Caesarea (now Kayseri), Ottoman Empire on December 1, 1882, or 1883, Cardashian studied in the local French lyceum and Talas American College. He emigrated to the United States in 1902. He got accepted at Yale University in 1904 and earned a law degree in 1908. In the same year, he wrote a book entitled The Ottoman Empire of the Twentieth Century.

Cardashian entered the New York State Bar Association in 1909 and began practicing law. In 1913, he was the Fiscal Agent of the Ottoman Empire in the United States. Prior to the Armenian genocide of 1915, he served as a counselor and statistician to the Ottoman Chamber of Commerce in America. He was a counselor for the Ottoman Embassy in Washington, D.C., and then to the Ottoman Consulate General in New York from 1910 to 1915. He authored several books on the Armenian Question.

In early 1919, he founded the American Committee for the Independence of Armenia (ACIA), the predecessor of the Armenian National Committee of America (ANCA). He continued his efforts until his death in 1934. Some authors claim otherwise, but in his 1934 obituary, it is stated that Cardashian was survived by his sister, mother and brother.
