= Sardarapat Memorial =

War memorial in Araks, Armenia

Coordinates: 40°5′37.05″N 43°56′48.13″E

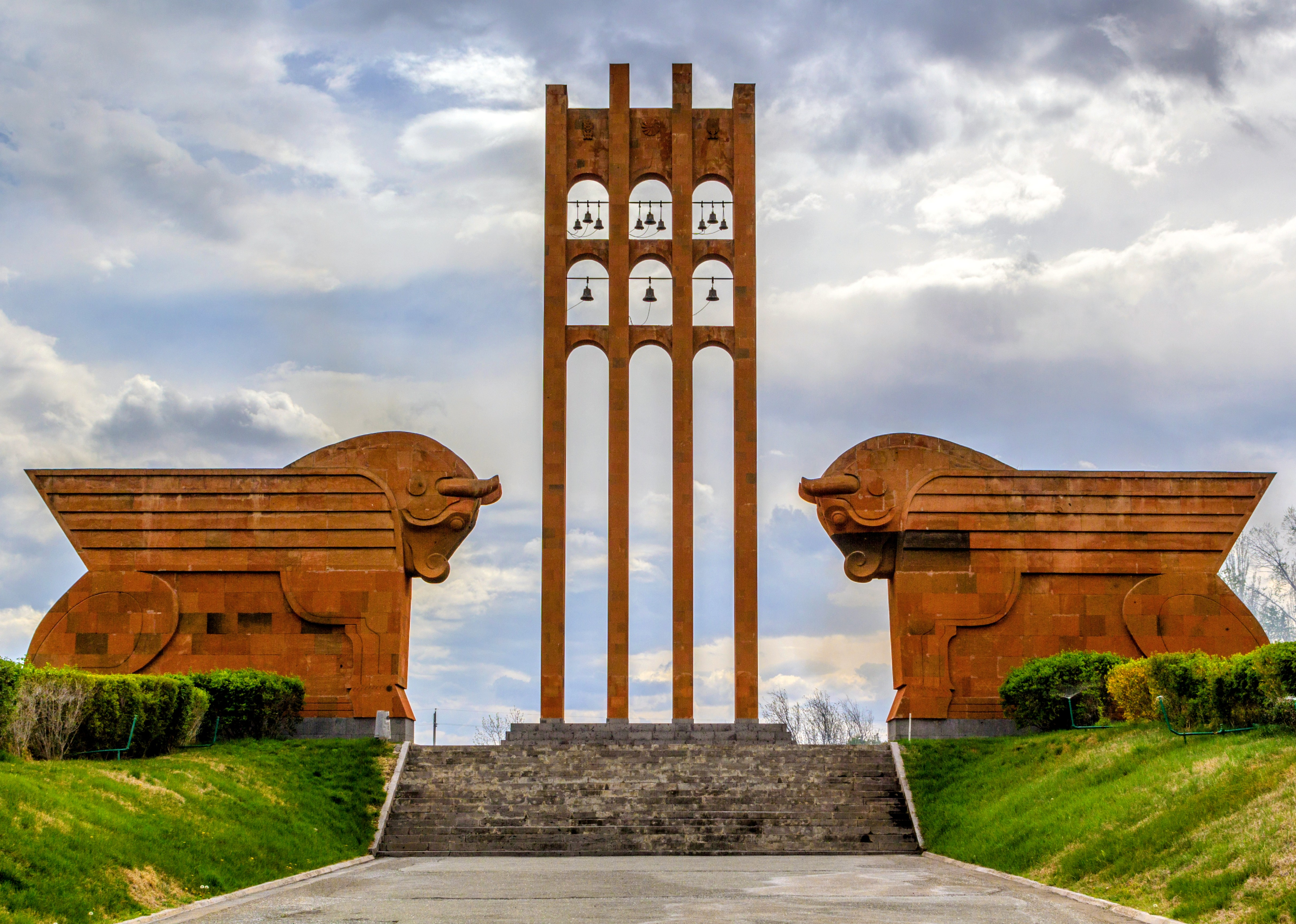
Sardarapat memorial in April 2014.

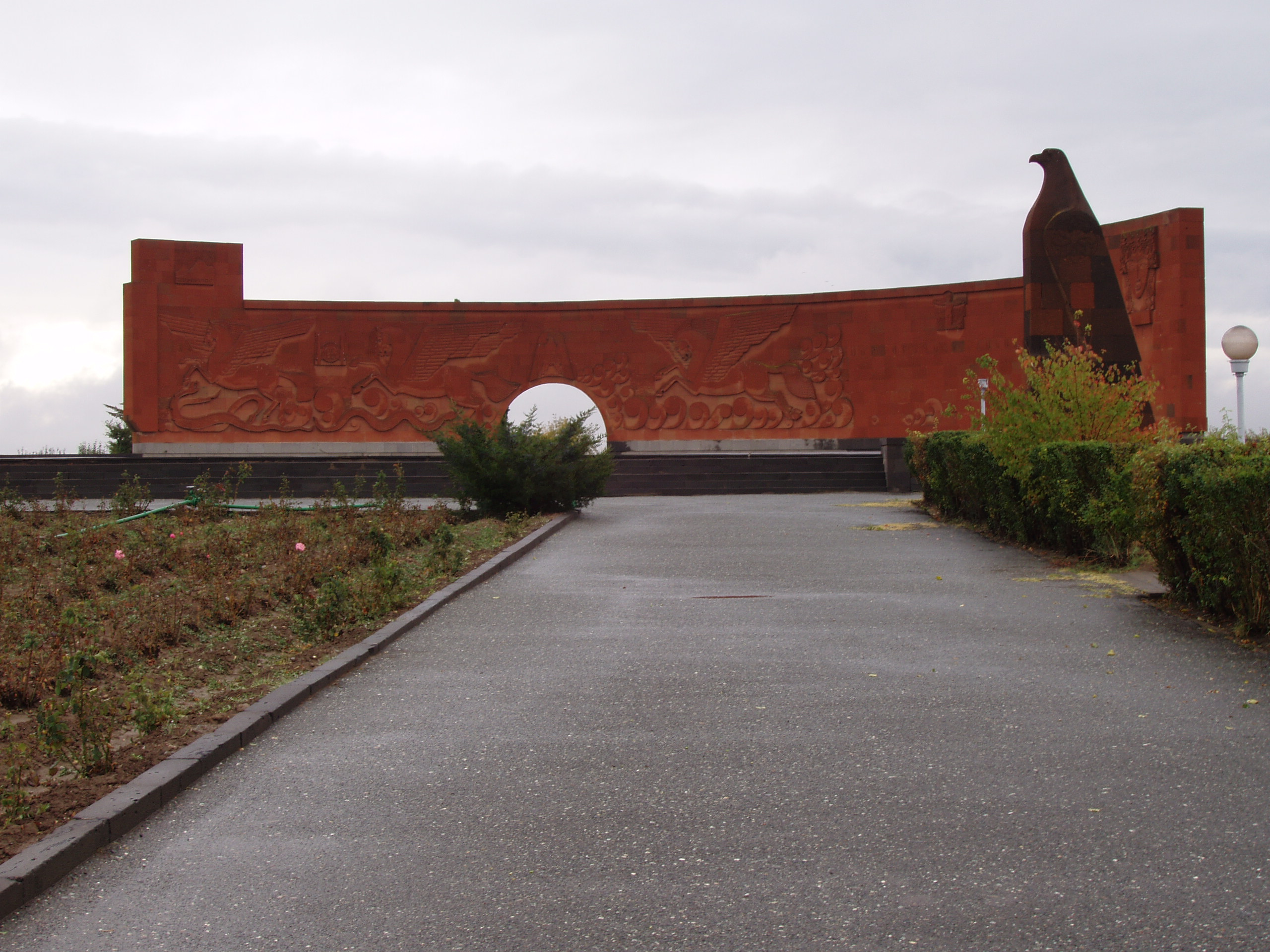
The memorial wall

Sardarapat Memorial is a memorial complex to the Battle of Sardarabad located in the village of Araks, in the Armavir Province of Armenia, 11 kilometers southwest of Armavir town.

== Design ==
The memorial was designed by architect Rafael Israelyan while the sculpting is by Ara Harutyunyan, Arsham Shahinyan and Sambel Minasyan.

The entrance is flanked by huge winged oxen made of red tufa. A flight of steps leads to a square from which a 26-metre-high bell tower rises. The beautiful trellised structure with its twelve bells can be seen from afar. The bells ring every year on the day of the historic victory. The monument is guarded by massive ancient style Armenian-winged lions, and is flanked by a memorial garden for Karabakh (Arstakh) martyrs.

== History ==
In the early 1960s, initiatives in honor of the battle were conceived, one of the main authors of which was the First Secretary of the Communist Party of Armenia Yakov Zarobyan, who pointed to an interest in perpetuating historical events in the Armenian diaspora. In 1964, Zarobyan's report was sent to the Central Committee of the CPSU, after which Moscow gave its consent for the project. In 1966, a change in the leadership of Soviet Armenia took place, during which Zarobyan was replaced by Anton Kochinyan, under whom, the construction of the memorial was carried out. In 1968 during the commemoration of the 50th anniversary of the Battle of Sardarapat that took place on May 22–26, 1918 a memorial park was laid out on the spot of the battlefield. In 1969, the Sardarapat Memorial Complex was nominated for the USSR State Prize. In the early 1980s, the leaders of the Armenian SSR, the Georgian SSR and the Azerbaijan SSR (Karen Demirchyan, Eduard Shevardnadze and Heydar Aliyev respectively) visited the memorial complex as part of the session of the Military Council of the Transcaucasian Military District. The presence of Azerbaijan's Aliyev at the memorial is notable in that it marked the only time an Azeri leader paid respects to Armenia's war dead.

== Notable events ==
The Republic Day celebrations are held at the memorial every year, with the President of Armenia, the Prime Minister of Armenia, and the President of Artsakh visiting to lay a wreath at the monument. In the centennial celebrations of the Armenian state in 2018, a ceremonial military parade was held at the memorial, which featured hundreds of soldiers dressed in military uniforms from the First Armenian, Red Army uniforms from World War II, as well as veterans of the first Nagorno-Karabakh War. It also featured units of the Armenian Army, the Border Service of the National Security Service, the Police, forces of the Ministry of Emergency Situations and servicemen of the Russian 102nd Military Base.

== Significance ==
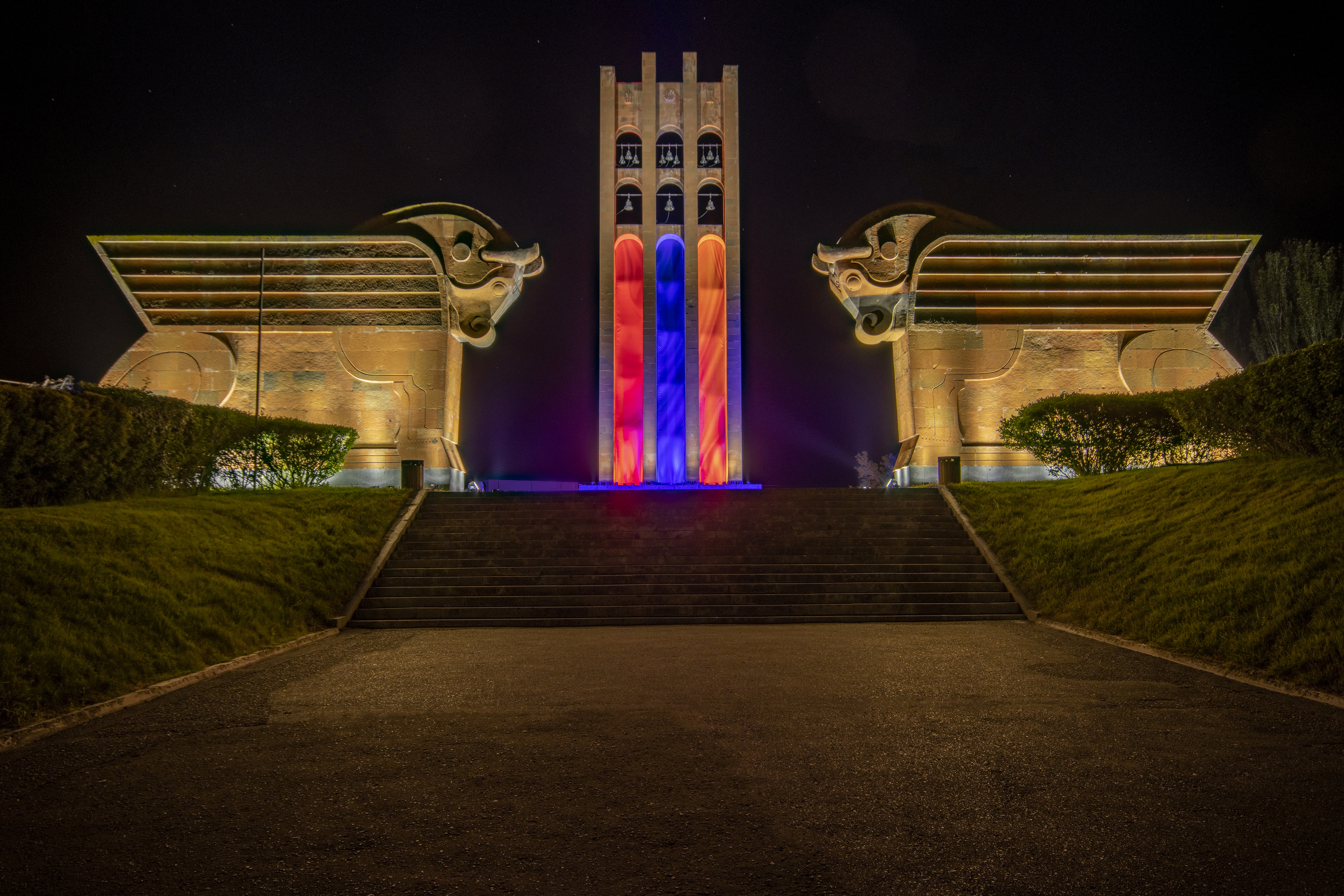
Sardarapat Memorial with special illumination on Independence day, May 28

Sardarapat Memorial is a symbol of pride and survival, the Sardarapat Memorial marks the place of Armenia's successful last-ditch effort to "save the nation from obliteration at the hands of the Turks" in the Battle of Sardarapat between 21 and 29 May 1918. Against tremendous odds, and during the haunting backdrop of genocide during the previous few years, Armenia's makeshift army rebuffed the Turkish troops and safeguarded the small portion of historic Armenia which became the current republic as it stands today. On the grounds of the historic battle one can today visit the Sardarapat Ethnography and Liberation Movement History Museum adjacent to the outdoor monument.

== See also ==
- Armenian genocide
- Caucasus Campaign
- Battle of Sardarapat
