= Malkhas =

American writer and revolutionary

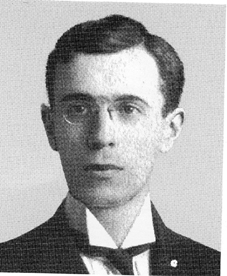
Malkhas (Ardashes Hovsepian)

Ardashes Hovsepian (Armenian: Արտաշէս Յովսէփեան; 1877–1962) better known by his penname Malkhas was an Armenian writer and revolutionary, best known for his four-volume novel Awakening (Zartonk).

== Biography ==
Malkhas was born in 1877, in Trabzon in the Ottoman Empire. A member of the Armenian Revolutionary Federation (ARF) from his youth, he immigrated to the United States where he wrote for the ARF newspaper Hairenik in Boston.

In 1900 he returned to the Ottoman Empire as an ARF activist, and took part in the 1904 Sasun uprising. In 1908, he returned to his native Trabzon, where he founded the ARF publication Khariskh (Anchor).

Moving to Russian South Caucasus, he took part in the 1918 independence movement and was elected to the parliament of the First Republic of Armenia. After the failed ARF uprising against recently established Soviet rule in Armenia, he found refuge in Persia before moving again to the United States, where he contributed regularly to Hairenik Monthly. In 1933, he published the four-part historical novel Awakening, which tells the story of the Armenian revolutionary movements in the late 19th and early 20th century. He also published his autobiography titled Life Experiences (Aprumner).

He died of a heart attack at the age of 85 while visiting Beirut for a series of cultural events.
