= Section 907 =

Azerbaijan–United States relations

Section 907 of the 1992 United States Freedom Support Act banned any kind of direct United States aid to the Azerbaijani government. Up until 2001, this ban made Azerbaijan the only post-Soviet state not to receive direct aid from the United States government to facilitate economic and political stability. The Act was strongly lobbied for by the Armenian-American community in the US, and was enacted in response to Azerbaijan's blockade of Armenia and its support for the ethnic cleansing of Nagorno-Karabakh during the Karabakh Movement.

On October 24, 2001, the Senate adopted an amendment to the Act that would provide the President with the ability to waive Section 907. Every US president has waived Section 907 since then. On November 15, 2023, United States Senate adopted a bill that would suspend all military aid to Azerbaijan by repealing the Freedom Support Act Section 907 waiver authority for the Administration with respect to assistance to Azerbaijan for fiscal years 2024 or 2025.

In August 2025, US president Donald Trump waived Section 907 during a meeting with Azerbaijani president Ilham Aliyev in Washington. Aliyev said that the waiver "carries great symbolic significance".

== Text of Section 907 ==
Section 907 of the Freedom Support Act (Public Law 102-511) Washington DC, 24 October 1992

Sec. 907. RESTRICTION ON ASSISTANCE TO AZERBAIJAN.

(A) RESTRICTIONS - United States assistance under this or any other Act (other than assistance under title V of this Act) may not be provided to the Government of Azerbaijan until the President determines, and so reports to the Congress, that the Government of Azerbaijan is taking demonstrable steps to cease all blockades and other offensive uses of force against Armenia and Nagorno-Karabakh.

(B) WAIVER- The restriction on assistance in subsection (a) shall not apply if the President determines, and so certifies to Congress, that the application of the restriction would not be in the national interests of the United States.

== Text of the Public Law 107-115 ==
(1) Section 907 of the FREEDOM Support Act shall not apply to--

(A) activities to support democracy or assistance under title V of the FREEDOM Support Act and section 1424 of Public Law 104-201 or non-proliferation assistance;
(B) any assistance provided by the Trade and Development Agency under section 661 of the Foreign Assistance Act of 1961 (22 U.S.C. 2421);
(C) any activity carried out by a member of the United States and Foreign Commercial Service while acting within his or her official capacity;
(D) any insurance, reinsurance, guarantee or other assistance provided by the Overseas Private Investment Corporation under title IV of chapter 2 of part I of the Foreign Assistance Act of 1961 (22 U.S.C. 2191 et seq.);
(E) any financing provided under the Export-Import Bank Act of 1945; or
(F) humanitarian assistance.

(2) The President may waive section 907 of the FREEDOM Support Act if he determines and certifies to the Committees on Appropriations that to do so--

(A) is necessary to support United States efforts to counter international terrorism; or
(B) is necessary to support the operational readiness of United States Armed Forces or coalition partners to counter international terrorism; or
(C) is important to Azerbaijan's border security; and
(D) will not undermine or hamper ongoing efforts to negotiate a peaceful settlement between Armenia and Azerbaijan or be used for offensive purposes against Armenia.

(3) The authority of paragraph (2) may only be exercised through December 31, 2002.

(4) The President may extend the waiver authority provided in paragraph (2) on an annual basis on or after December 31, 2002, if he determines and certifies to the Committees on Appropriations in accordance with the provisions of paragraph (2).

(5) The Committees on Appropriations shall be consulted prior to the provision of any assistance made available pursuant to paragraph (2).

(6) Within 60 days of any exercise of the authority under paragraph (2) the President shall send a report to the appropriate congressional committees specifying in detail the following--

(A) the nature and quantity of all training and assistance provided to the Government of Azerbaijan pursuant to paragraph (2);
(B) the status of the military balance between Azerbaijan and Armenia and the impact of United States assistance on that balance; and
(C) the status of negotiations for a peaceful settlement between Armenia and Azerbaijan and the impact of United States assistance on those negotiations.
