= Freedom Support Act =

1992 Act of the United States Congress

The Freedom for Russia and Emerging Eurasian Democracies and Open Markets Support Act, also referred to as the FREEDOM Support Act (FSA) of 1992, was passed by bipartisan majorities of the United States Congress, and signed by President George H. W. Bush on October 24, 1992, following the collapse of the USSR. Fully immersing themselves into the U.S. Foreign Policy strategies of the post-Cold War, the Freedom Support Act (FSA) also encompassed advancing democracies and strategies to avoid republics entering into authoritarian regimes once again. The FREEDOM Support Act provided nuclear guidelines to the newly independent nations of East Europe, promoted an open economy, and the American experience of capitalism and democracy. The act also highlighted conditions in which States would not be eligible to receive American aid. President Bush would go on to establish diplomatic relationships with 12 of the 15 recognized nations to participate in global markets and international affairs.

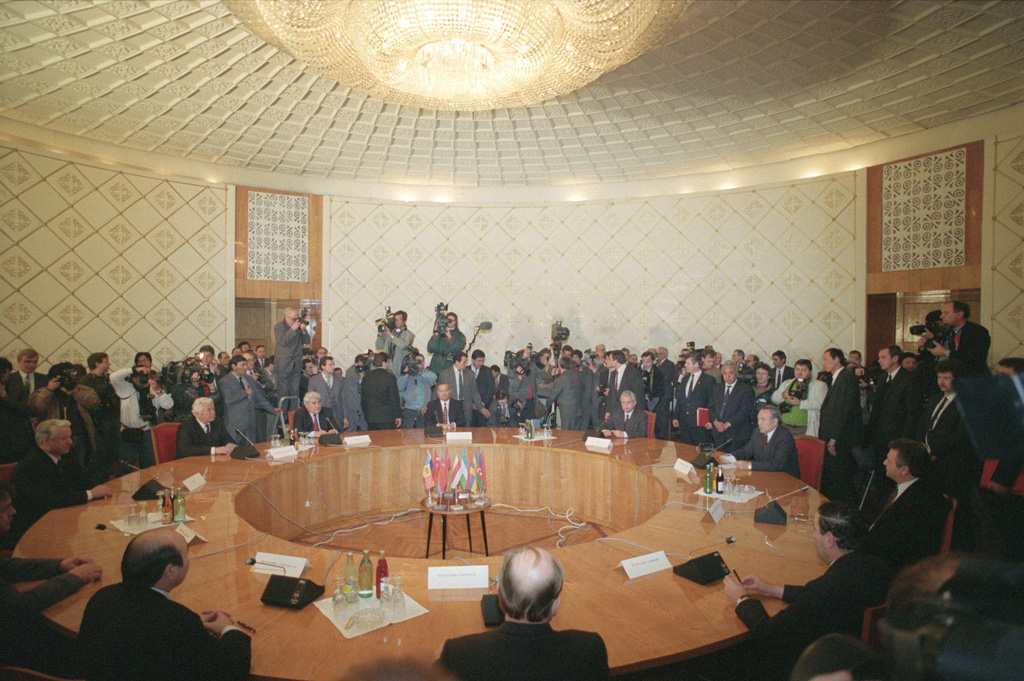
Signing of Protocol to Establish Independent States

Sponsored by Sen Claiborne Pell the bill was introduced as S.2532 into the Senate on April 7, 1992, and would later pass in the Senate on July 2, 1992, by the House on August 6, 1992.

Sponsoring this bill addressed numerous interests of Senator Pell's as it supported democracy and free markets critical in the time of the Soviet Collapse.

The FSA was signed into law on October 24, 1992, by President George H. W. Bush and assigned Public Law No. 102 – 511.

== Formation of the Act ==
Freedom for Russia and Emerging Eurasian Democracies and Open Markets Support Act of 1992
- Other short titles: FREEDOM Support Act
- Long title: An Act to support democracy and open markets in the independent states of the former Soviet Union, and for other purposes.
- Acronyms (colloquial): FSA
- Enacted by: the 102nd United States Congress
- Effective: October 24, 1992

Citations
- Public law: 102-511
- Statutes at Large: 106 Stat. 3320

Codification
- Titles amended: 22 U.S.C.: Foreign Relations and Intercourse
- U.S.C. sections created: 22 U.S.C. ch. 67 § 5801 et seq.

Legislative history
- Signed into law by President George H. W. Bush on October 24, 1992

The legislative process of the FREEDOM Support Act of 1992 began with the introduction of bills in the House when it was introduced on June 3, 1991, as H.R. 2508. A series of hearings would occur in House committees and Senate committees starting on July 30 and continuing into the new year term until July 27 of the following year. The 1991 hearings primarily centered around solving the debt of the Soviet Union, trade opportunities, and agricultural aid. The following year, a shift occurred within these hearings as Congress aimed to support the newly independent states individually. House and Senate both considered economic assistance but were primarily considered with nuclear disarmament efforts.

Having just negatively dealt with the Soviet Union for decades, it was heavily implied that moving forward, the US would be skeptical and precise in its dealings with Russia; hence, when the Freedom Support Act was introduced, legislators and the public were left with more questions than answers. According to Robert Kasten, a republican representative from Wisconsin, the act had in just a few short months been claimed by six different committees and was “full of vague definitions that defied Congressional attempts to assess the costs.” Concerns raised on the dangers such as furthering economic collapse, political anarchy, and the appearance of “darker forces,” also referred to as nuclear weapons. According to Senate committees, there was a need for reorganizing and solidifying the governments of the ex-Soviet Union by “repackaging previous congressional and administration proposals into a single piece of legislation.”

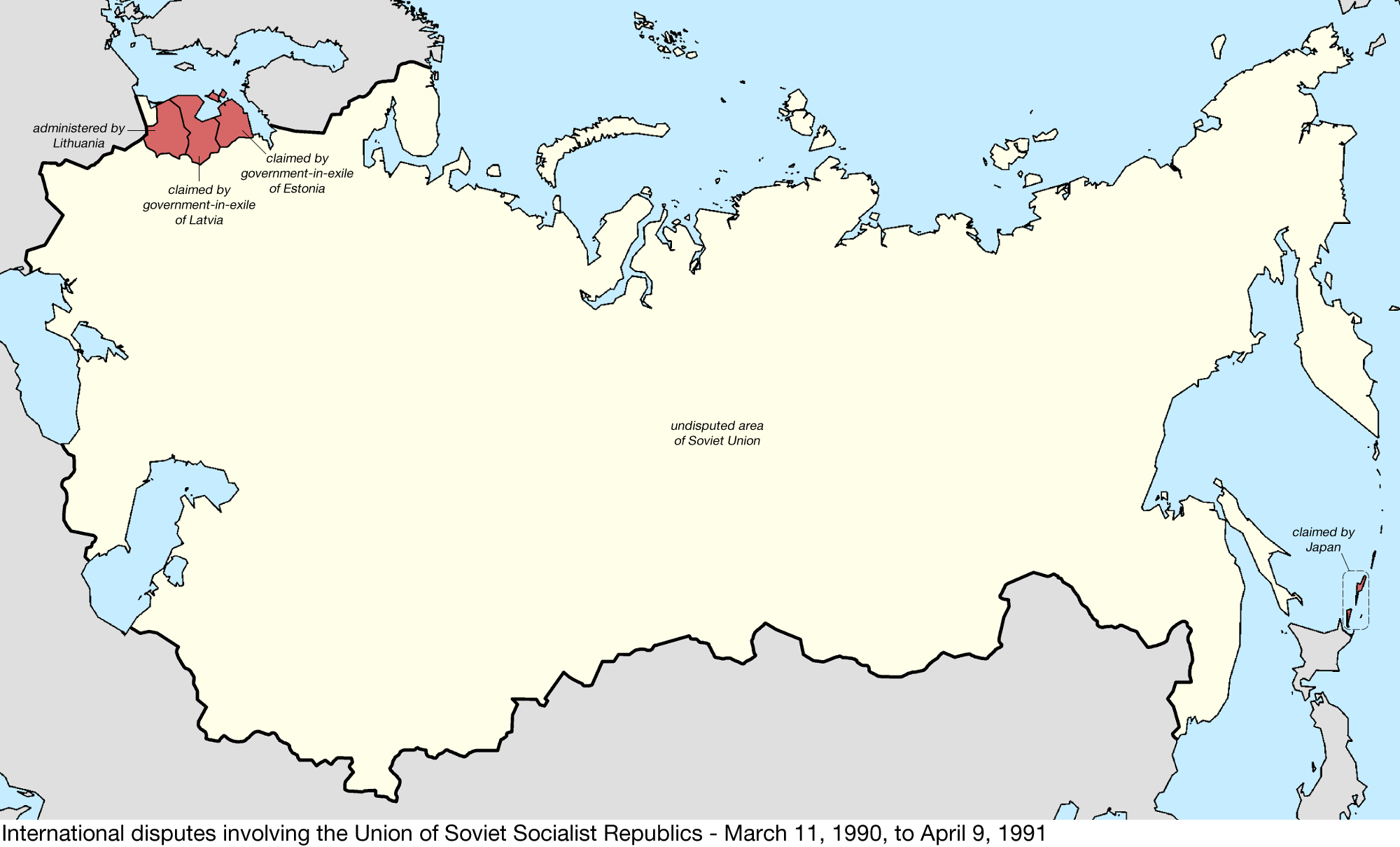
Soviet Union disputes 1990-03-11 to 1991-04-09

The Senate debated this bill first on July 24–26, 1991. The bill would then go on to be debated in the House on August 26, 1992, which was the only listed deliberation and consideration of the House. Halfway through 1992, the bill continued to be debated, as both Democrats and Republicans were concerned with humanitarian aid and long-term economic assistance. Bipartisan amendments passed in the process of forming the bill, as foreign affairs were significant; however, few Republican Senate members were concerned with the effects domestically.

Closing out by the end of summer in 1992, amendments passed in the Senate, and on October 1, 1992, the FREEDOM Support Act of 1992 entered the Senate floor and passed. A few days later, on October 3. 1992, the bill entered the House of Representatives floor and was passed. President George H.W. Bush would go on to sign Public Law No. 102 – 511 on October 24.

The main points addressed in the FREEDOM Support Act include; bilateral economic assistance, business development, democracy corps, nonproliferation programs, space trade, and agriculture trade.

Title I: Requires the State Department coordinator to assist former Soviet states, excluding the Baltics states.

Title II: Amends U.S. assistance on human rights conditions, democracy violations, and peaceful conflict resolutions.

Title III: Creates more support to fuel U.S. economic interests in the new states by export promotion through the American Business Centers, designed to operate in the developing markets of Russia and the newly independent states to stimulate economic growth and create jobs in the United States.

Title IV: Authorizes the creation of the Democracy Corps to assist developing democratic governments through technical assistance and prohibits campaign funding.

Title V: Amends nonproliferation and discernment programs to ensure peaceful scientific collaboration between the U.S. and the new states.

Title VI: Speed the process of newly independent states working with one another on space collaboration.

Title VII: Expand aid for food to independent states and promote U.S. agricultural exports to emerging democracies committed to pursuing economic freedom.

Title VIII: Amended a fellowship program to support agricultural business exchanges with other independent states without additional funds.

Title IX: Expanded justice to more East European nations that once were not considered and restricted aid to Azerbaijan until it halts aggression against Armenia and Nagorno-Karabakh.

Title X: Authorized the U.S. Governor of the IMF to consent to increased funds for poverty reduction and economic stability while promoting local participation in the IMF.

== Major provisions ==
A significant piece of legislation, the FSA set up the former Soviet Union to advance their independent states exponentially. The legislation's provisions firstly regulated a shift in economies from centrally planned to open and free markets, giving much of their resources to mostly small corporations. Additionally, a small but notable provision focused on nuclear nonproliferation and disarmament, as well as securing Soviet Union nuclear weapons, minimizing former Cold War fears. The Act also allocated humanitarian resources for education, food distribution, and healthcare, and, most importantly, it promoted democracies by funding civil society organizations and fair and free elections. All of these provisions and more would allow once-authoritarian regimes to enter a world dominated by democracy and free trade properly.

In a twenty-year update following the passing of the Freedom Support Act, the United States had successfully provided $15 billion in assistance to 12 countries of the former Soviet Union. The United States supported NGOs, economic reforms, promoting human rights, establishing enterprise funds, and building independent media while addressing a shutdown and spread of nuclear weapons. Created through the act are the U.S. Civilian Research & Development Foundation, the Armenia School Connectivity Program and other organizations founded to foster growth in the former Soviet Union. Although generous the United States was in 1992, their wishes and goals for this Act were met, and they still couldn't help fully resolve issues, especially concerning the independent states' new free economies. Operation Provide Hope, which was the first US government program under the FSA, has and continued to provide tangible aid to needy and conflict-affected populations of the region, but many still live impoverished lives.
