= EU Planning Assistance Team in Armenia =

Unarmed mission of the European Union in Armenia

European Union Planning Assistance Team in Armenia

- Map of Europe with the European Union in green and Armenia in orange.
- Abbreviation: EUPAT Armenia
- Predecessor: European Union Monitoring Capacity to Armenia
- Successor: European Union Mission in Armenia
- Formation: December 20, 2022; 3 years ago
- Dissolved: January 23, 2023; 3 years ago
- Head of the European Union Planning Assistance Team in Armenia: Marcin Wydra
- Parent organization: European Union

The European Union Planning Assistance Team in Armenia (EUPAT) was a European Union initiative established to assess the potential of deploying a long-term civilian CSDP mission to Armenia. It replaced the European Union Monitoring Capacity to Armenia, which concluded its mandate on 19 December 2022 and was superseded by a longer term mission, the European Union Mission in Armenia on 23 January 2023.

== History ==
The European Union Monitoring Capacity to Armenia (EUMCAP) was a European Union civilian deployment in Armenia that was agreed on 6 October 2022 and officially became operational on 20 October 2022. EUMCAP was deployed in order to monitor the Armenia–Azerbaijan border following the Armenia–Azerbaijan border crisis. EUMCAP completed its mandate on 19 December 2022 at which point it was superseded by the European Union Planning Assistance Team in Armenia in preparation of a possible longer term mission in the country.

Following the conclusion of EUMCAP's mandate, the European Council and the Government of Armenia agreed that the European Union Monitoring Mission in Georgia (EUMM Georgia) would deploy its personnel to serve in the European Union Transitional Planning Assistance Team in Armenia. The mandate of the EU Transitional Planning Assistance Team in Armenia became active on 20 December 2022.

On 19 January 2023, the European Parliament voted in favor of a resolution condemning Azerbaijani military aggression and for the closure of the Lachin corridor, resulting in the blockade of Artsakh. The motion supports greater EU involvement towards settling the Nagorno-Karabakh conflict and for Russian peacekeepers to be replaced by international ones. Nathalie Loiseau, a member of the European Parliament stated, "Russia is not a reliable actor in the region anymore" and "Moscow's influence is waning since its catastrophic invasion of Ukraine." Several protests have occurred in Armenia and Artsakh demanding Armenia's withdrawal from the CSTO and to seek greater support from the West instead.

The European External Action Service announced that there are plans to potentially send 100 EU monitors to Armenia for a period of 2 years. Henri Duquenne, the spokesman for the EU's special representative in the South Caucasus stated, "It's important the EU plays a role even on the edges of Europe. Different member states have different interests, but as a whole, this is a priority region for us." In response, Russia's Foreign Minister Sergey Lavrov stated, "Despite the fact we are allies, the Armenian side prefers to negotiate with the EU."

== Mandate ==
The stated aim of the EU Planning Assistance Team in Armenia is to "enhance the EU's awareness of the security situation, contribute to the planning and preparation of a possible civilian CSDP mission in the country, and to support the President of the European Council Charles Michel's EU-facilitated normalization process between Armenia and Azerbaijan."

== Timeline of events ==
On 12 December 2022, the EU's Foreign Affairs Council stated, "Sending a permanent mission to Armenia would help maintain the EU's credibility as a facilitator of dialogue between Armenia and Azerbaijan."

On 16 December 2022, members of the European External Action Service arrived in Armenia for political consultations with Armenian authorities. Various issues were discussed including Armenia-EU relations and the implementation of the Armenia–EU Comprehensive and Enhanced Partnership Agreement.

On 20 December 2022, the High Representative of the Union for Foreign Affairs and Security Policy, Josep Borrell stated, "Today we start a new phase in the EU's engagement in the South Caucasus, with a transitional team that will prepare the ground for a possible longer term EU mission in Armenia, with the ultimate goal of contributing to sustainable peace in the region."

On 9 January 2023, Foreign Minister of Armenia Ararat Mirzoyan held a meeting with members of the EU Planning Assistance Team in Yerevan. The Planning Assistance Team and Armenian officials discussed the possibility of deploying a long-term EU civilian mission to Armenia. Ambassador of the Delegation of the European Union to Armenia, Andrea Wiktorin participated in the discussions.

On 10 January 2023, the Minister of Defence of Armenia Suren Papikyan met with the Head of the EU Planning Assistance Team in Armenia, Marcin Wydra. The sides discussed regional issues, the EU's role in maintaining peace in the region, and the activities of the EU Planning Assistance Team towards planning a permanent Common Security and Defence Policy (CSDP) mission in Armenia.

On 23 January 2023, the Council of the European Union agreed to establish a longer term civilian mission under the Common Security and Defence Policy, the European Union Mission in Armenia (EUMA).

== See also ==
- Armenia–European Union relations
- EU Strategy for the South Caucasus
- Foreign relations of Armenia
- Foreign relations of the European Union
- Nagorno-Karabakh conflict
