= Common Security and Defence Policy Service Medal =

- Common obverse and reverse of the medal
- Type: Service Medal
- Awarded for: At least 30 days of service for each mission
- Presented by: European Union
- Eligibility: Civilian and military members of CSDP missions
- Motto: Pro Pace Unum (Together For Peace)
- Status: Currently awarded
- Established: 1 January 2003
- First award: 2004
- CSDP ALTHEA Operations medal ribbon bar CSDP ALTHEA Staff medal ribbon bar CSDP EUTM Mali Medal for Extraordinary Meritorious Service

Precedence
- Next (higher): Varies by country
- Next (lower): Varies by country

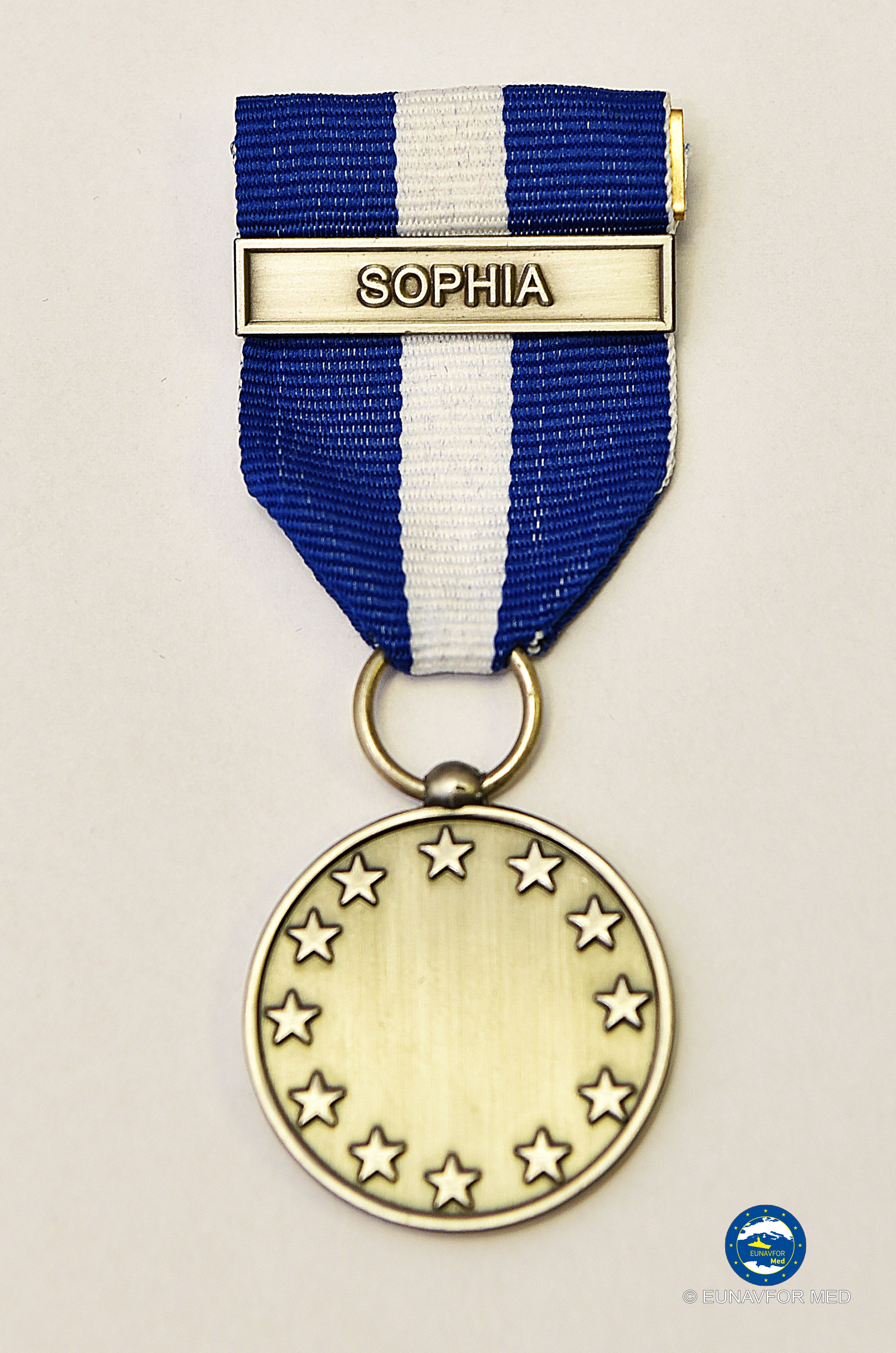
CSDP service medal of Operation Sophia

The Common Security and Defence Policy Service Medal (named the European Security and Defence Policy Service Medal prior to 2009) is an international military decoration awarded to individuals, both military and civilian, who have served with CSDP missions. Since the 1990s the European Union has taken a greater role in military missions both in Europe and abroad. These actions were taken under the Common Security and Defence Policy (CSDP), which is implemented by the European Union Military Staff, a department of the EU. To recognize service in these missions the EU authorized the creation of a medal with a common obverse and reverse, to which clasps featuring the missions' name are attached to the ribbon bar.

== Appearance ==
The medal is 36 mm (1 1/2 in) in diameter, made of a silver colored metal. All versions share a common design. The obverse of the medal is plain except for a circle of twelve five pointed stars around the outside edge of the medal. The reverse contains the Latin phrase, Pro Pace Unum, meaning "United for Peace". The words are arranged in three lines one word above the other in the center of the medal. The medal is suspended from a 36 mm (1 1/2 in) ribbon in EU blue with either a wide gold center stripe for headquarters and combat forces, or a wide white stripe for planning and support. Each operation is identified with a different clasp with the name of the operation worn on the ribbon of the medal. A miniature version is worn on the ribbon bar, when medals are not worn.

== Ribbons and clasps ==
- Police Mission in Bosnia and Herzegovina (EUPM), 1 January 2003 – 30 June 2012
- EUFOR Concordia, 31 March 2003 – 15 December 2003
- Operation Artemis, 12 June 2003 – 1 September 2003
- EUPOL Proxima in the former Yugoslav Republic of Macedonia, 15 December 2003 – 14 December 2005
- EUFOR Althea, 2 December 2004 –
- Reform Mission in the Democratic Republic of the Congo (EUSEC RD Congo), 8 June 2005 – 2016
- AMIS EU Supporting Action, 18 July 2005 – 31 December 2007
- Border Assistance Mission for the Rafah Crossing Point (EUBAM Rafah), 25 November 2005 –
- Coordinating Office for Palestinian Police Support (EUPOL COPPS), 1 January 2006 –
- EUFOR RD Congo, 12 June 2006 – 30 November 2006
- Police Mission to Afghanistan (EUPOL Afghanistan), 15 June 2007 – 31 December 2016
- Bridging Operation in Chad and the Central African Republic (EUFOR Tchad/RCA), 17 March 2008 – 15 March 2009
- European Union Monitoring Mission in Georgia (EUMM Georgia), October 2008 –
- EU Naval Operation Atalanta, 5 November 2008 –
- EU operations in Kosovo (including combined EU Election Observation Missions, European Commission and some early EULEX Kosovo awards), 9 December 2008 –
- Rule of Law Mission in Kosovo (EULEX Kosovo), 9 December 2008 – present
- European Union Somalia Training Mission (EUTM Somalia), in Uganda, May 2010 – present
- European Union Regional Maritime Capacity Building for the Horn of Africa and the Western Indian Ocean (EUCAP Somalia formerly EUCAP NESTOR), 16 July 2012 – present
- EUTM Mali, January 2013 – May 2024
- European Union Aviation Security Mission in South Sudan (EUAVSEC SOUTH SUDAN), February 2013 – January 2014
- EUFOR RCA, April 2014 – 2015
- EUAM Ukraine, December 2014 – present
- EUMAM RCA, March 2015 – July 2016
- EUNAVFOR Med - Operation Sophia, April 2015 – March 2020
- EUTM-RCA, July 2016 –
- EUAM-Iraq, October 2017 – present
- EUNAVFOR Med - Operation Irini, March 2020 – present
- EUMAM Ukraine, October 2022 – present
- EUM Armenia, January 2023 – present
- EUNAVFOR Aspides, February 2024 – present

== Precedence ==
Some orders of precedence are as follows:

| Country | Preceding | Following |
| (Canada) Canada; Order of precedence | International Force East Timor Medal | Polar Medal |
| (Republic of Ireland) Ireland; Order of seniority | European Union Monitoring Mission Medal | International Conference on the Former Yugoslavia Medal |
| (Spain) Spain; Order of precedence | Western European Union Medal | UNAVEM Medal |
| (Netherlands) The Netherlands; Order of precedence | European Community Monitor Mission Medal | Baltic Air Policing Medal |
| (New Zealand) New Zealand; Order of precedence | NATO Medal for the Non-Article 5 ISAF Operation in Afghanistan | New Zealand General Service Medal 2002 (Timor-Leste) |
| (United Kingdom) United Kingdom; Order of precedence | Western European Union Medal | Commonwealth realms orders and decorations |

== See also ==
- European Community Monitor Mission Medal
- Western European Union Mission Service Medal
- International decoration
