= European Union Monitoring Mission =

European Union Monitoring Mission may refer to:

- European Union Monitoring Mission in the former Yugoslavia
- European Union Monitoring Mission in Georgia
