= Armenia–Azerbaijan relations =

- Armenia: Azerbaijan

There are currently no diplomatic relations between Armenia and Azerbaijan, though both countries committed to a peace agreement on 8 August 2025. The two neighboring states had formal governmental relations between 1918 and 1921, during their brief independence from the collapsed Russian Empire, as the First Republic of Armenia and the Democratic Republic of Azerbaijan; these relations existed from the period after the Russian Revolution until they were occupied and annexed by the Soviet Union, becoming the constituent republics of Soviet Armenia and Soviet Azerbaijan. Due to the five wars waged by the countries in the past century—one from 1918 to 1921, another from 1988 to 1994, and the most recent in 2016, 2020 and 2023—the two countries have had strained and largely hostile relations. Azerbaijan has continued to enforce a blockade of Armenia since 1989. Social memory of Soviet-era cohabitation is widely repressed through censorship, stigmatization, and government policies that promote mutually hostile sentiment.

== History ==
=== In the Russian Empire ===
In the Armenian–Tatar massacres of 1905–1906, Armenians and Caucasian Tatars (later known as Azerbaijanis) killed each other and destroyed homes with up to 10,000 deaths and 286 villages destroyed throughout the Russian Caucasus.

=== Relations between 1918 and 1921 ===
Upon the disintegration of the Transcaucasian Federation with the proclamation of the independent Democratic Republic of Georgia on 26 May 1918, both Azerbaijan and Armenia proclaimed their independence on the same day, 28 May 1918. Both Armenia and Azerbaijan laid claim to the territory which they saw as historically and ethnically theirs; these territorial disputes led to the Armenian–Azerbaijani War between 1918 and 1920, a series of conflicts that ended only when both Armenia and Azerbaijan were annexed by the Soviet Union.

=== Soviet Union (1922–1991) ===
Upon the establishment of the USSR in 1922, Azerbaijan SSR and Armenian SSR became constituent states, initially as a part of the Transcaucasian SFSR, and from 1936 as separate entities within the union. The relations between the Azerbaijani and Armenian authorities, including in Nagorno-Karabakh Autonomous Oblast (NKAO), were generally peaceful and friendly whilst all Soviet entities. In December 1947, the communist leaders of Armenia and Azerbaijan addressed a joint letter to supreme Soviet leader Joseph Stalin. In the letter, the leaders of the two republics agreed to relocate 130,000 Azerbaijanis from Armenia to Azerbaijan, thereby creating vacancies for Armenians coming to Armenia from abroad. Though occasional confrontations did occur, particularly the 1948 and the 1964 public protests in Armenia which resulted in the exodus of a large number of Azeris, they remained unknown to a broader public due to strict Soviet censorship. According to Soviet Census (1979), 160,841 Azeris lived in Armenia and 352,410 Armenians lived in Azerbaijan outside of Nagorno-Karabakh. The Soviet Census (1989) showed a decline of those minorities to 84,860 Azeris in Armenia and 245,045 Armenians in Azerbaijan outside of Nagorno-Karabakh.

=== First Nagorno-Karabakh War ===
The Armenians of Nagorno-Karabakh, motivated by fears of cultural and physical erasure under government policies from Azerbaijan, began the 1988 Karabakh movement advocating for reunification (Miatsum) with Armenia. In 1988, the Armenians of Nagorno-Karabakh voted to secede and join Armenia. This was met with extreme violence from Azerbaijani authorities and civilians in Sumgait, Baku, Kirovabad, escalating tensions and culminating in the First Nagorno-Karabakh War. Azerbaijan and Turkey imposed a transportation and economic blockade of Armenia which persists to this day, while Artsakh was also blockaded until 2023.

The Soviet government in Moscow initially backed Azerbaijan in return for Azerbaijan supporting Mikhail Gorbachev's attempts to keep the Soviet Union together. Soviet and Soviet Azerbaijani troops both forcibly uprooted Armenian civilians in part of Nagorno-Karabakh during Operation Ring. Following the dissolution of the Soviet Union, the war clearly became an international conflict between sovereign states.

The war resulted in de facto Armenian occupation of the former NKAO and seven surrounding Azerbaijani territories, this advance was effectively halted when both sides agreed to observe a cease-fire in May 1994. In late 1995, Armenia and Azerbaijan agreed to find a negotiated resolution to the conflict over Nagorno-Karabakh mediated by the OSCE Minsk Group. The Minsk Group is currently co-chaired by the US, France, and Russia and comprises Armenia, Azerbaijan, Turkey, and several European states.

During the conflict the largest city Stepanakert was besieged by Azerbaijani forces from late 1991 to May 1992 whereby Armenians were bombarded, civilian and armed. The indiscriminate shelling, sniper shooting and aerial attacks killed or maimed hundreds of civilians and destroyed homes, hospitals and other buildings that were not legitimate military targets, and generally terrorized the civilian population. Azerbaijan blockaded all essential supplies, including water, electricity, food and medicines causing many deaths. Human Rights Watch reported that key bases used by forces for bombardment were the towns of Khojaly and Shusha.

Amid this Khojaly massacre – the mass murder of ethnic Azerbaijani citizens of Khojaly occurred on 26 February 1992. According to Human Rights Watch, the tragedy struck when a large column of residents, accompanied by a few dozen retreating fighters, fled the city as it fell to Armenian forces. As they approached the border with Azerbaijan, they came across an Armenian military post and were fired upon".

=== Relations from 1994–2015 ===
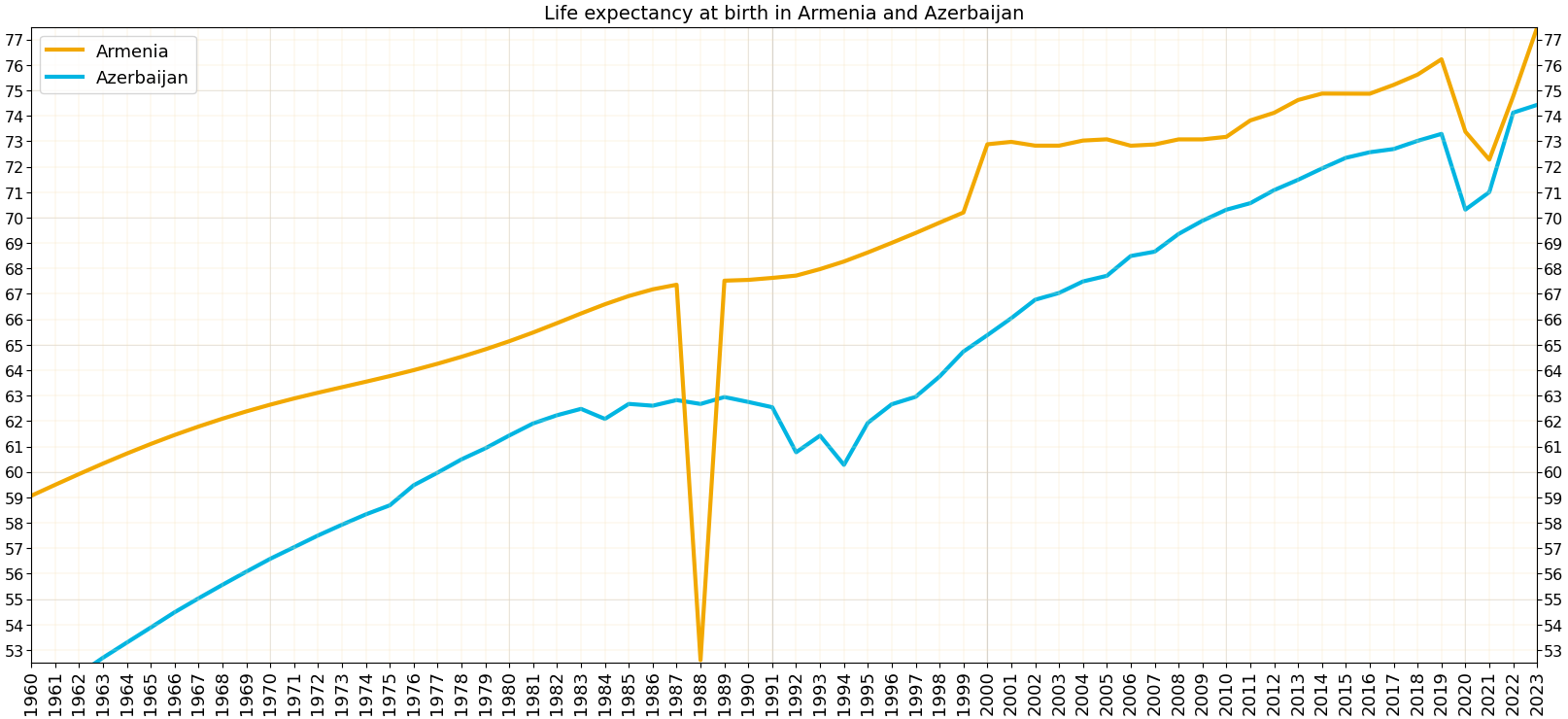
Comparison of life expectancy in Armenia and Azerbaijan

After the war, relations between Armenia and Azerbaijan remained very tense. In 2008, Azerbaijani president Ilham Aliyev declared that "Nagorno Karabakh will never be independent; the position is backed by international mediators as well; Armenia has to accept the reality" and that "in 1918, Yerevan was granted to the Armenians. Khanate of Iravan was the Azeri territory, the Armenians were guests here."

Citizens of Armenia, people of Armenian descent and those who have visited the disputed region are forbidden entry to Azerbaijan without prior formal authorisation.

In 2008, in what became known as the 2008 Mardakert Skirmishes, Armenia and Azerbaijan clashed over Nagorno-Karabakh. The fighting between the two sides was brief, with few casualties on either side.

June 2010 saw a brief flare-up of the conflict, resulting in the deaths of four Armenian soldiers and one Azeri soldier. The clash came a day after peace talks between the presidents of the two countries held in Moscow.

On 31 August 2010, a border clash killed three Armenians and two Azeris. The Armenian army claimed up to seven Azeris had been killed. Both sides blamed the other for the incident.

On 24 June 2011, the two sides met in Kazan, Russia, to negotiate an end to the Nagorno-Karabakh issue, but the talks ended in failure. Following the breakdown of talks, the Azeri President Ilham Aliyev used the 26 June Salvation Day military parade to warn Armenia that Azerbaijan may retake Nagorno-Karabakh by force. On 5 October 2011, border clashes around Nagorno Karabakh left one Armenian soldier and two Azeris dead. Two Armenians were also wounded by sniper fire the same day. Another violent incident occurred on 5 June 2012 when, according to the Azerbaijani side, Armenian troops crossed the border and shot dead five Azerbaijani soldiers before withdrawing. Armenia denied the claim and accused Azerbaijan of crossing the border first.

In October 2013, Zakir Hasanov was appointed as Azerbaijani Defence Minister despite controversy.

From 27 July to 8 August 2014, clashes began once again between Armenian and Azerbaijani forces. Reported casualties of the clashes were some of the highest since the 1994 ceasefire agreement that ended the First Nagorno-Karabakh War.

=== 2016 clashes ===
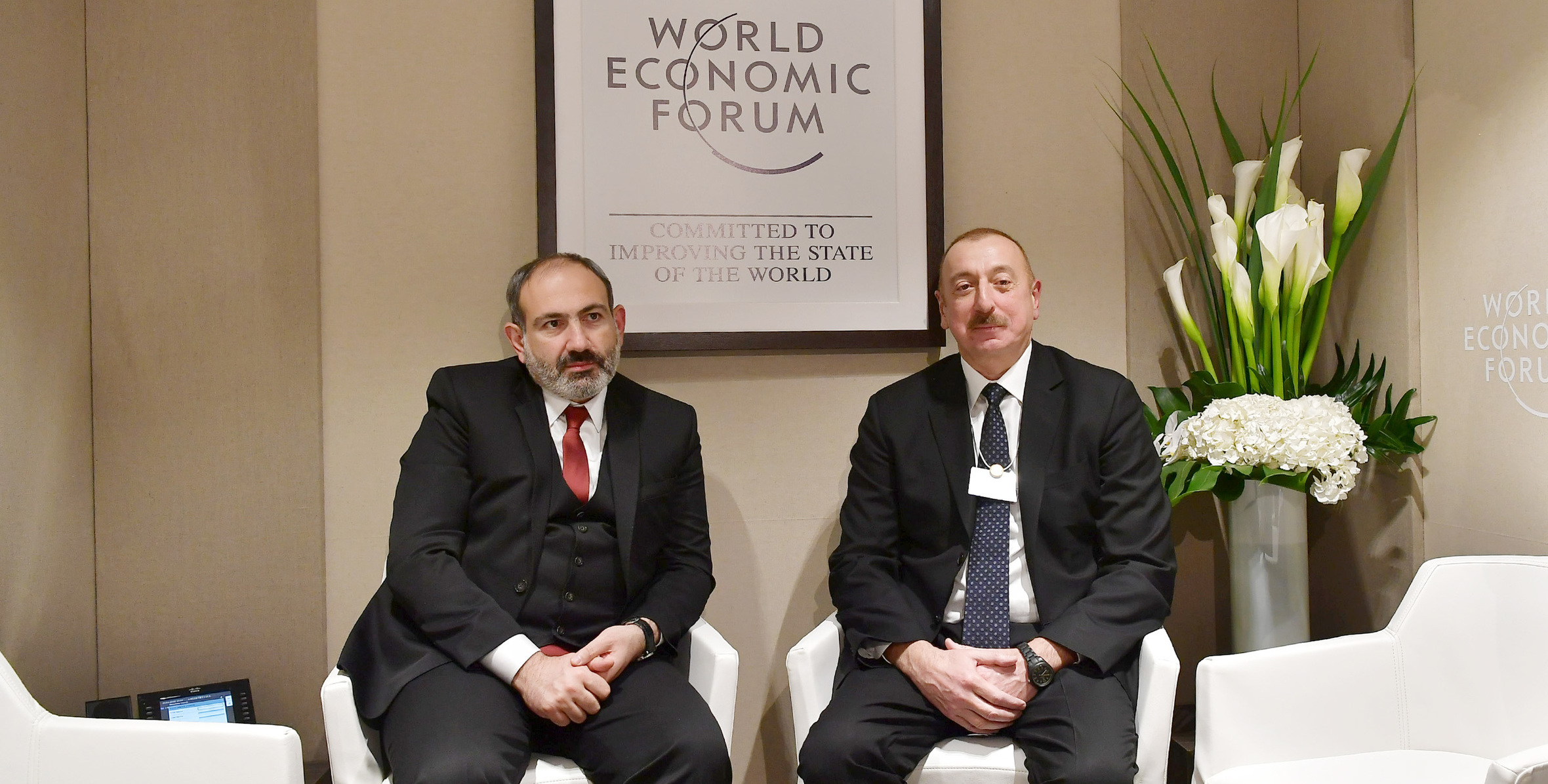
Armenian Prime Minister Nikol Pashinyan meets with Azerbaijani President Ilham Aliyev in Davos, Switzerland, January 2019.

After the 2016 clashes, in which an estimated 350 troops and civilians from both sides were killed, Azerbaijan declared a unilateral cease fire (the clashes started when Azerbaijani forces launched strikes to regain control of territory occupied by the Armenia-backed breakaway Nagorno-Karabakh).

=== 2020 clashes and the Second Nagorno-Karabakh War ===
Both sides clashed on the Armenia–Azerbaijan border: Tavush and Tovuz (respectively) from 12 until 18 July 2020, in a conflict involving artillery, tanks, and shock drones, which killed at least 17 soldiers and a civilian and injured many more. Both sides reported four commanding or junior officer-rank army deaths, one on the Azeri side being a major general.

On 27 September 2020, heavy fighting along the line of contact between locally based Armenian and Azeri troops resumed. Armenia, Nagorno-Karabakh (or the de facto territory of Artsakh), and Azerbaijan declaring martial law and mobilizing new and existing conscripts and professional soldiers.

On 9 October 2020, the UN High Commissioner for Human Rights, Michelle Bachelet appealed for an urgent ceasefire, citing civilian sufferings in the Nagorno-Karabakh conflict zone. She also raised concerns about overpopulated areas that were becoming targets for the heavy weaponry attacks.

On 17 October a new ceasefire agreement was announced by the Armenian and Azerbaijani foreign ministers following phone calls between Russian Foreign Minister Sergey Lavrov and his counterparts. Lavrov strongly urged the countries to abide by the Moscow deal. However, both sides have accused each other of violating the truce further continuing the conflict. Bachelet expressed concerns on possible war crimes during the clashes between Armenia and Azerbaijan in the Nagorno-Karabakh conflict zone. On 30 October 2020, Armenia and Azerbaijan reached an agreement that abstained them from deliberately targeting the civilians’ population, despite which artillery strikes in populated areas were reported.

==== Ceasefire ====
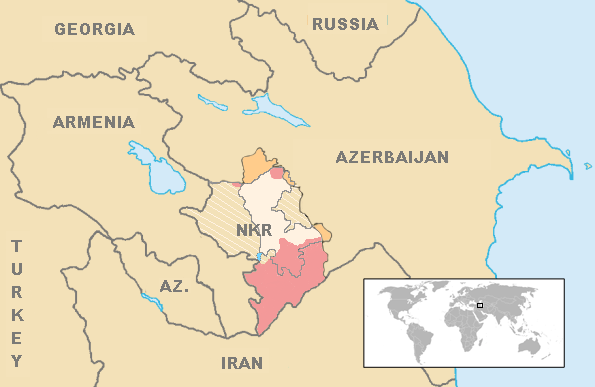
Frontlines at the time of the signing of the agreement with Azerbaijan's territorial gains during the war in red, the Lachin corridor under Russian peacekeepers in blue, and areas to be surrendered by Armenia to Azerbaijan hashed

A ceasefire agreement brokered by Russia and agreed upon by Armenia, Azerbaijan, and the Republic of Artsakh (non-signatory) on 9 November 2020, and effective since midnight 10 November 2020, Moscow Time ended all hostilities in the Nagorno-Karabakh region. Azerbaijan claimed victory as it gained control of 5 cities, 4 towns, 240 villages and the entire Azerbaijan–Iran border. Some parts of Nagorno-Karabakh, along with all Armenian-occupied territories surrounding Nagorno-Karabakh are to be ceded to Azerbaijan by 1 December 2020. As part of the 2020 ceasefire agreement, Armenia and Azerbaijan agreed to open transport links between their two countries, although the details have not been finalized.

Around 2,000 Russian soldiers, led by Rustam Muradov, were to be deployed as peacekeeping forces to protect the land corridor between Armenia and the Nagorno-Karabakh region for a mandate of at least five years. Russian forces were also to guarantee the roads connecting Azerbaijan and Nakhchivan.

=== Armenia–Azerbaijan border crisis (2021–2025) ===
On 12 May, Azerbaijani troops crossed into internationally recognized Armenian territory, claiming the area around Lake Sev. Armenian Prime Minister, Nikol Pashinyan, attempted to appeal to the CSTO about the incursion. On 20 May, Azerbaijani servicemen crossed the border near Khoznavar and were forced back to their territory by the Armenian Armed Forces, leaving men wounded on both sides. On 27 May, Azerbaijani forces captured six Armenian soldiers near the border. The EU then urged both sides to pull back their forces and instead engage in negotiations on border demarcation. Armenia and Azerbaijan continued to clash from 7–15 July near Tovuz, Gadabay, and Shusha districts. Azerbaijan then attempted to better their strategic position near Yeraskh, leading to a whole new set of clashes and Yeraskh's shelling, resulting in two wounded and an Armenian soldier dead.

Clashes continued from July 2021 to April 2022, killing and wounding men from both sides of the border.

After failed peace talks, the fighting renewed with the border clashes on 12 September. A ceasefire was agreed, to end the fighting after claiming 155 lives from both sides on 14 September, two days later.

==== October 2022 EPC Summit ====
On 6 October 2022, Azerbaijani President Ilham Aliyev and Armenian Prime Minister Nikol Pashinyan met during the European Political Community summit in Prague. In a statement issued following the meeting, the two parties confirmed their commitment to upholding the United Nations Charter and the Alma-Ata Protocol through which they recognize each other's territorial integrity and sovereignty. The parties also agreed to the deployment of a European Union mission on the Armenian side of their border for a period of two months starting in October 2022. This ultimately leading to a longer term European Union Mission in Armenia.

==== October 2022 OSCE Needs Assessment Team ====
An OSCE Needs Assessment Team was deployed by the Organization for Security and Co-operation in Europe (OSCE) in the territory of Armenia between 21 and 27 October 2022 following the border crisis.

=== 2023 ===
==== First joint statement ====
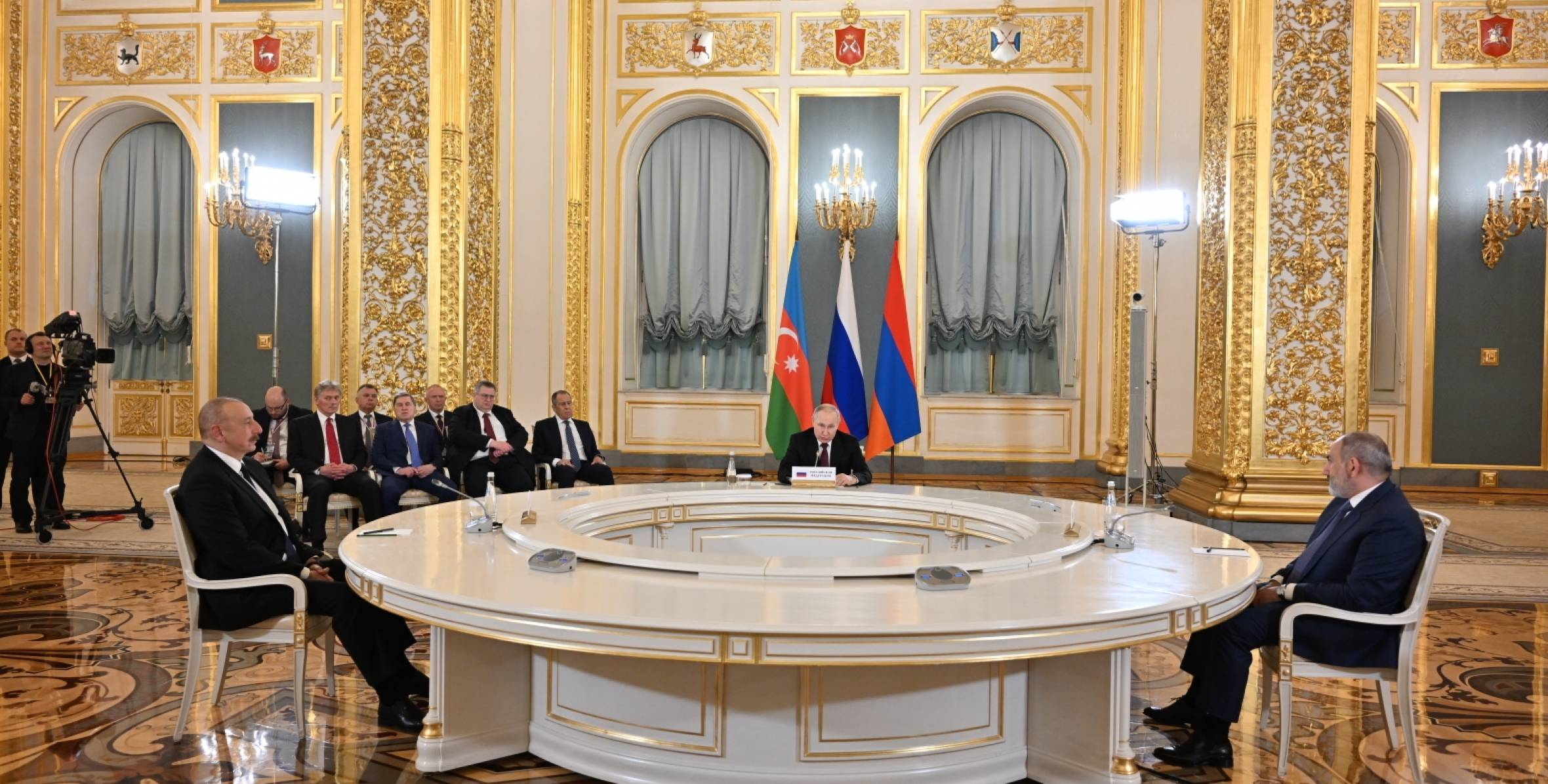
In May 2023, the President of the Republic of Azerbaijan Ilham Aliyev had a trilateral summit meeting with the President of the Russian Federation Vladimir Putin and the Prime Minister of the Republic of Armenia Nikol Pashinyan in Moscow

In 2023, for the first time since the collapse of the Soviet Union and the beginning of the Karabakh conflict, Azerbaijan and Armenia made a joint statement without an intermediary. They agreed to exchange prisoners. According to the agreement, 32 Armenian servicemen and two Azerbaijani servicemen were respectively released by the parties. Ordinary Azerbaijani and Armenian users on social media reacted positively to that step and called for peace. Several states and institutions welcomed the joint statement.

==== United Nations Climate Change Conference (COP29) ====
As a gesture of goodwill, the Republic of Armenia supported the bid of the Republic of Azerbaijan to host the 29th Session of the Conference of Parties (COP29) to the UN Framework Convention on Climate Change, by withdrawing its own candidacy. This was announced jointly by the Administration of the President of the Republic of Azerbaijan and the Office of the Prime Minister of the Republic of Armenia.

==== June 2023 EPC Summit ====
Azerbaijani President Ilham Aliyev and Armenian Prime Minister Nikol Pashinyan met in Moscow on 25 May 2023. They agreed to recognise each other's states' territorial integrity within Soviet-era administrative borders. Pashinyan confirmed these reports the following day stating "I want to confirm that Armenia and Azerbaijan agreed on mutual recognition of each other's territorial integrity, and on this basis we can say that we are moving quite well towards settlement of our relations." Aliyev stated, "I think there is a possibility of a peace agreement – especially because Armenia has officially recognised Karabakh as part of Azerbaijan. ... Azerbaijan has no territorial claims against Armenia today". The leaders of both countries met at the second EPC summit on 1 June 2023 where discussions focused on the unblocking of regional transport, economic infrastructure, border delimitation and security, the rights and security of the ethnic-Armenian population in Nagorno-Karabakh, and prisoners of war and missing persons. Both agreed to meet again on 21 June in Brussels.

==== Azerbaijani offensive in Nagorno-Karabakh ====
In September 2023, Azerbaijan launched a large-scale military offensive in the disputed region of Nagorno-Karabakh, which ended with the surrender of the breakaway state of Artsakh and the disbandment of its armed forces. The offensive and subsequent surrender resulted in the expulsion of Nagorno-Karabakh Armenians, in which nearly the entire population of Nagorno-Karabakh fled the region to Armenia.

=== 2024 ===
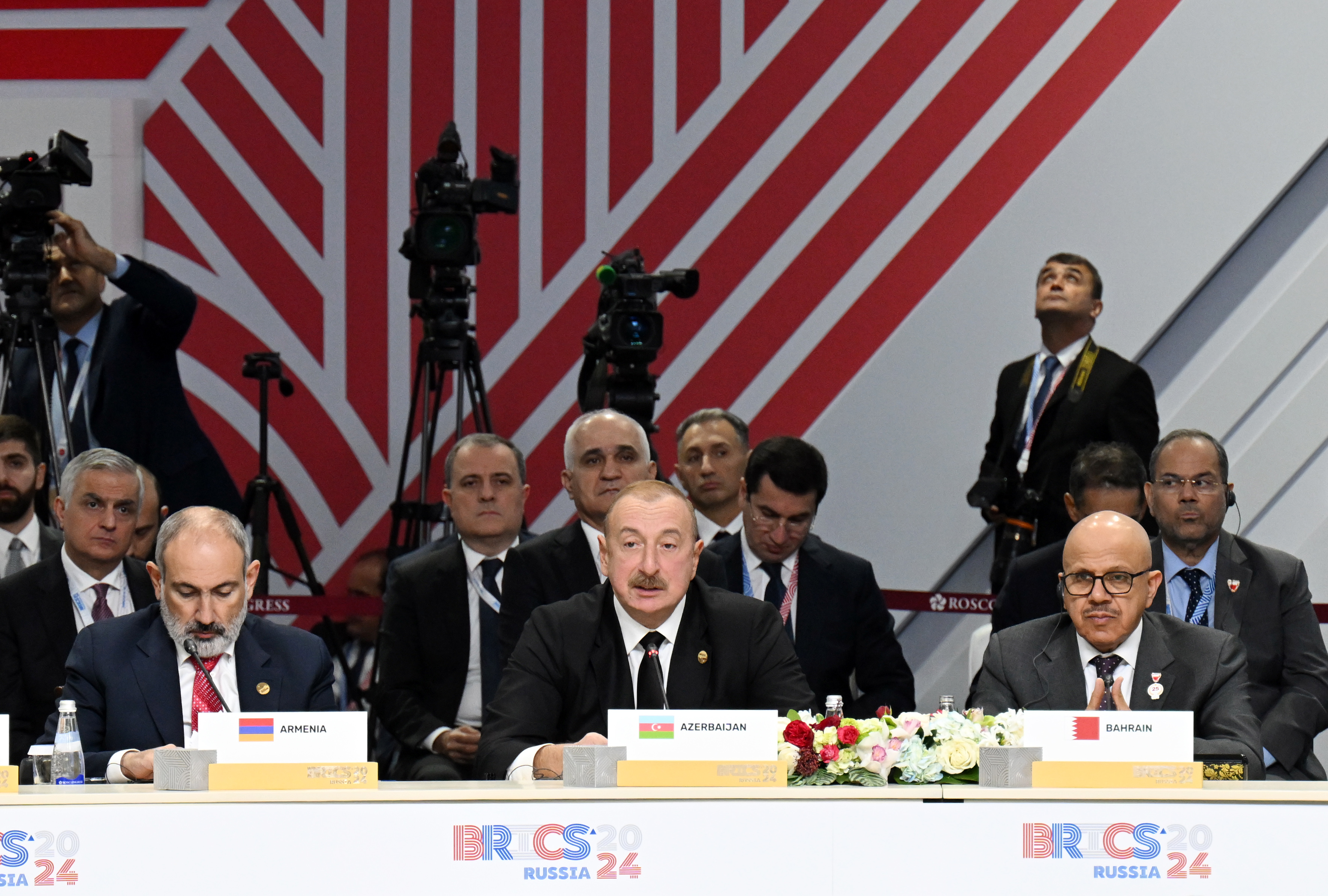
Armenian prime minister Nikol Pashinyan and Azerbaijani president Ilham Aliyev at the 16th BRICS summit in Russia, 24 October 2024

In 2024, the de facto Armenia–Azerbaijan border was amended to give four ghost town villages in Armenia to Azerbaijan, which were already part of the latter's Qazax District. Armenian Foreign Minister Ararat Mirzoyan and Azerbaijani Foreign Minister Jeyhun Bayramov met in Almaty, Kazakhstan, on 10-11 May 2024, within the scope of the Armenia-Azerbaijan normalization process talks.

=== 2025 ===
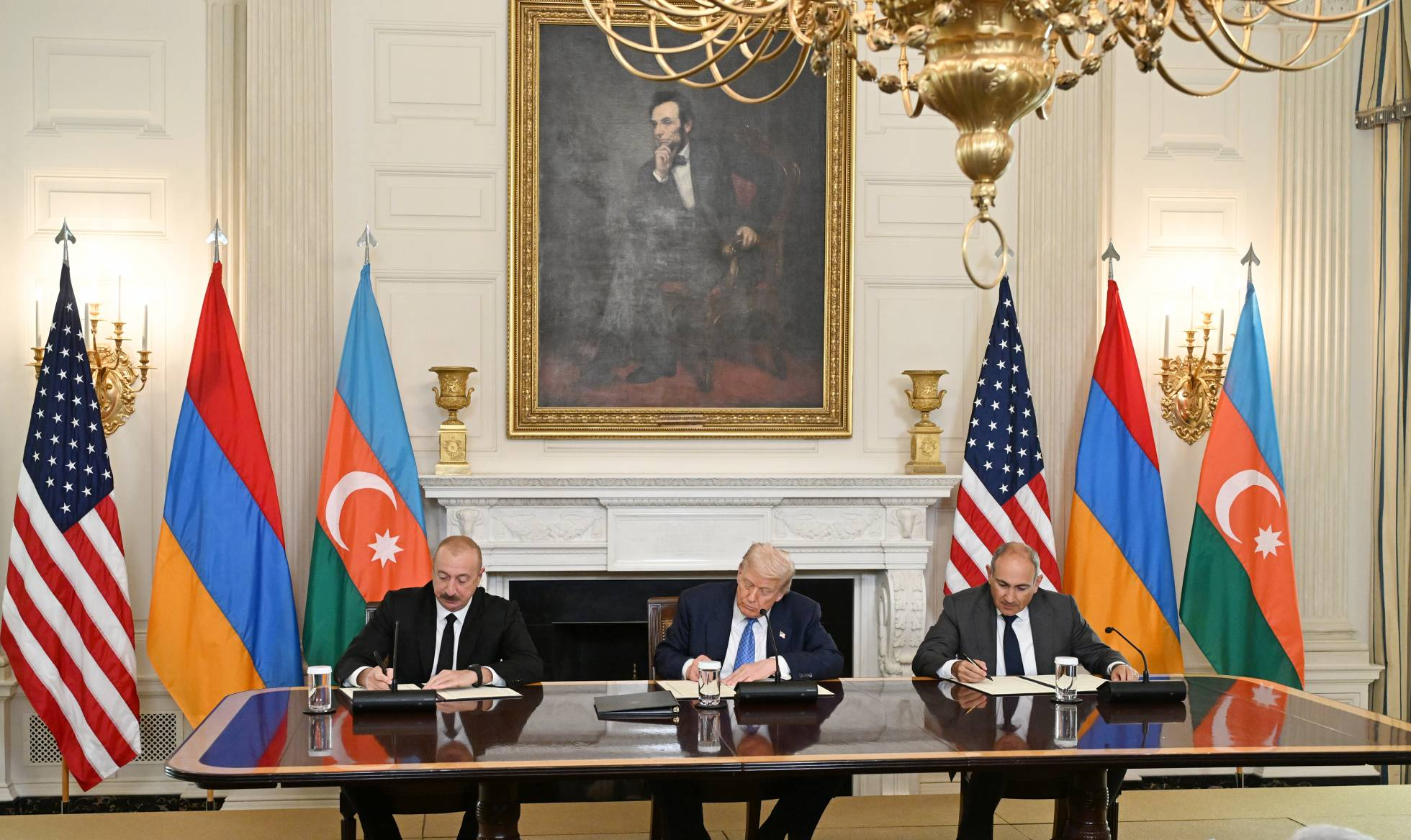
Joint Declaration signed between Armenian prime minister Nikol Pashinyan and Azerbaijani president Ilham Aliyev in Washington, D.C., 8 August 2025

On 5 March, Aliyev made a territorial claim over a strip of Armenian land separating Azerbaijan from Nakhchivan, calling it "West Zangezur." In response, Armenia called up reservists for military training. The dispute centered on the Zangezur Corridor, a proposed land route linking Azerbaijan and Nakhchivan, which became a major point of contention. While Azerbaijan sought extraterritorial rights to the corridor, Armenia maintained that it would not compromise its sovereignty. Russia supported the creation of the corridor, while Iran opposed it. On the same day, Aliyev and Turkish President Recep Tayyip Erdoğan inaugurated a gas pipeline linking Nakhchivan to Turkey, further isolating Armenia.

On 13 March, Armenia and Azerbaijan announced that both sides had agreed on the framework for a "comprehensive" peace treaty to end the Nagorno-Karabakh conflict. Furthermore, Pashinyan's geopolitical realignment of the country, according to College of Europe researcher Nurlan Aliyev, combined with Russia's recent movements against Azerbaijan after two Azerbaijanis were killed by Russia's FSB in Yekaterinburg in June, have pushed the former rivals to enter into a "South Caucasus security architecture" without the influence of Russia and one that they will support themselves.

On 8 August, Pashinyan and Aliyev signed a joint declaration at the White House, committing to a peace deal facilitated by the Trump administration that would end nearly four decades of conflict between the two countries. The agreement also granted the United States exclusive development rights for the corridor, which will be operated under Armenian law and subleased to a consortium—moves analysts say could “unlock the region” and pave the way for Azerbaijan’s possible entry into the Abraham Accords.

=== 2026 ===
In March 2026, Azerbaijan imported goods from Armenia for the first time, with the total value amounting to US$960. During the first three months of the year, Azerbaijan exported products worth US$5.757 million to Armenia.

== See also ==
- Armenia–Azerbaijan peace agreement
- Dostluq, an Azerbaijani song composted in 1956 to cherish the Azerbaijani-Armenian friendship
- Anti-Armenian sentiment in Azerbaijan
- Anti-Azerbaijani sentiment in Armenia
- Armenia–Azerbaijan relations in the Eurovision Song Contest
- Armenia–Azerbaijan border
- Armenians in Azerbaijan
- Azerbaijanis in Armenia
- EU Strategy for the South Caucasus
- Foreign relations of Armenia
- Foreign relations of Azerbaijan
- List of conflicts between Armenia and Azerbaijan
- Trump corridor
