= European Union Monitoring Mission in the former Yugoslavia =

- Abbreviation: ECMM / EUMM
- Formation: 15 July 1991
- Dissolved: 31 December 2007
- Headquarters: Zagreb, Croatia

The European Union Monitoring Mission (EUMM), between 1991 and 2000 known as the European Community Monitoring Mission (ECMM), was a mission of the European Union in the former Yugoslavia.

== History ==
The European Union Monitoring Mission began operating on 15 July 1991 under the name of ECMM (European Community Monitoring Mission) as established by the Brioni Agreement on 7 July 1991. The mission was financed by the European Commission and at times consisted of over 200 personnel. The mission was headquartered in Zagreb and its designated area included Slovenia, Bosnia and Herzegovina, Croatia, Serbia, Montenegro, Albania and the Republic of Macedonia. ECMM was renamed as European Union Monitoring Mission on 22 December 2000.

In January 1992, the mission was briefly suspended following the helicopter downing that killed five of its observers in northern Croatia.

A short history of the early work of the Mission was produced in 1992, and circulated privately.

The EUMM in the former Yugoslavia ended on 31 December 2007.

== See also ==
- List of military and civilian missions of the European Union
- European Union Monitoring Mission in Georgia
- European Union Monitoring Capacity to Armenia
- European Union Monitoring Mission Medal
- European Community Monitor Mission Medal
