= European Union Mission in Armenia =

Unarmed civilian mission of the European Union in Armenia

- Map of Europe with the European Union in green and Armenia in orange.
- Abbreviation: EUMA
- Predecessor: EU Planning Assistance Team in Armenia
- Formation: January 23, 2023; 3 years ago
- Headquarters: Yeghegnadzor (Liaison and Support Office in Yerevan)
- Civilian Operations Commander: Stefano Tomat
- Head of Mission: Satu Koivu
- Parent organization: European Union
- Staff: 225
- Website: www.eeas.europa.eu/euma

The European Union Mission in Armenia (EUMA) is a European Union Common Security and Defence Policy civilian deployment on the territory of Armenia.

== History ==
The mission was announced on 23 January 2023 to build upon the work of two previous EU deployments in Armenia, the European Union Monitoring Capacity to Armenia (EUMCAP) and the EU Planning Assistance Team in Armenia (EUPAT) following the Armenia–Azerbaijan border crisis. The mission was formally launched on 20 February 2023. Unlike EUMCAP, which was planned with the approval of Azerbaijan, EUMA went ahead without Azerbaijani approval.

== Mandate ==
The objective of the mission is to contribute to stability in the border areas of Armenia, build confidence on the ground, conduct active patrolling and reporting, and to support the normalization efforts between Armenia and Azerbaijan led by the President of the European Council, Charles Michel.

EUMA was defined in January 2023 to have an initial mandate of 2 years with the possibility of extension, and its operational headquarters is based within Armenia. It was expected that around 103 EU personnel would be deployed. One of the tasks of the EUMA is to conduct border patrols along the entire length of Armenia's border with Azerbaijan, including along the Nakhchivan exclave. Azerbaijan is notified of the mission's weekly schedule and of patrols ahead of time. EUMA maintains six Forward Operating Bases (FOBs) in Goris, Ijevan, Jermuk, Kapan, Martuni and Yeghegnadzor as well as a Liaison and Support Office in Yerevan.

On 11 December 2023, the EU confirmed that the number of staff stationed in Armenia will increase to 209.

On 30 January 2025, the Council of the European Union approved the extension of EUMA's mandate for another two years, until 19 February 2027, with a budget allocation of over €44 million for the period from 20 February 2025 until 19 February 2027. EUMA also increased its personnel to 225.

== Contributing states ==
Since launch, the following countries have contributed personnel:

- Austria
- Belgium
- Bulgaria
- Canada
- Cyprus
- Czechia
- Denmark
- Estonia
- Finland
- France
- Germany
- Greece
- Hungary
- Ireland
- Italy
- Latvia
- Lithuania
- Luxembourg
- Netherlands
- Poland
- Portugal
- Romania
- Slovakia
- Slovenia
- Spain
- Sweden

Croatia is the only EU country that has no mission in Armenia.

== Timeline of events ==
=== 2022 ===
On 27 December 2022, Armenian Foreign Minister, Ararat Mirzoyan wrote to the EU's High Representative of the Union for Foreign Affairs and Security Policy and invited the European Union to deploy a civilian CSDP mission in the country. The mission was subsequently approved by the Council of the European Union on 23 January 2023 with an initial period of deployment of two years.

=== 2023 ===
On 23 January 2023, Prime Minister of Armenia Nikol Pashinyan met with EU Special Representative for the South Caucasus, Toivo Klaar and the EU Ambassador to Armenia Andrea Wiktorin to discuss the deployment of EUMA, expanding Armenia–EU cooperation, and issues concerning the blockade of Artsakh.

On 27 January 2023, the first high-level Armenia-EU Political and Security Dialogue meeting took place in Yerevan. Deputy Foreign Minister of Armenia Vahe Gevorgyan and Deputy Secretary General of the European External Action Service Enrique Mora discussed increasing political ties and further developing Armenia–European Union relations. The parties discussed issues facing Armenia and security challenges across Europe, the deployment of EUMA, the need to establish a stable and peaceful South Caucasus region, and the process of normalization of Armenia–Turkey relations. Enrique Mora stated, "The first ever Armenia-EU Political and Security Dialogue launched today demonstrates our mutual interest in enhancing cooperation on foreign and security policy issues, and readiness to work together for the benefit of peace, security and stability."

On 30 January 2023, Markus Ritter, an officer of the German Federal Police and former Head of the European Union Advisory Mission in Iraq, was named as the Head of Mission of EUMA. It was also announced that the headquarters of the mission will be in Yeghegnadzor. Meanwhile, Stefano Tomat, the EEAS Managing Director of the Civilian Planning and Conduct Capability (CPCC), will serve as the Civilian Operations Commander.

On 9 February 2023, French MEP Nathalie Loiseau confirmed that members of the French National Gendarmerie will be among those deployed to Armenia as part of the EU mission. Loiseau stated, "the mission will start on February 20, and I will be in Armenia on that day. I welcome Armenia's support and cooperation with the mission. The mission will be our eyes and ears on the ground, and its presence should deter new attacks."

On 17 March 2023, during a meeting of the Standing Committee on European Integration, Armenian deputy foreign minister Paruyr Hovhannisyan stated that relations between Armenia and EU member states have been increasing over the past year and are more dynamic. The minister applauded the efforts of the EU Mission and stated that the EU has significantly contributed to the security and stabilization of the region.

In April 2023, the mission head Markus Ritter stated, "Many Armenians believe there'll be a spring offensive by Azerbaijan. If this doesn't happen, our mission is already a success."

On 4 May 2023, Prime Minister Nikol Pashinyan stated, "Armenia is interested in deepening cooperation with the European Union" and that the EU mission would help "maintain international attention towards our region".

Between 19 and 21 June 2023, delegates of the European Parliament Subcommittee on Security and Defence (SEDE) travelled to Armenia. Delegates conducted a joint patrol with EUMA personnel near the Lachin corridor, and met with representatives of the Armenian parliament and with EU member states ambassadors. SEDE delegates confirmed that the European Parliament fully supports sending an international fact-finding mission to the Lachin corridor in order to protect the rights and interests of the people of Nagorno-Karabakh and to end Azerbaijan's illegal blockade.

On 22 June 2023, Vaqif Sadıqov, Azerbaijan's ambassador to the EU, wrote a tweet saying that EUMA monitors should stay away from the Armenia-Azerbaijan border if they do not want to get shot by Azerbaijani snipers. Although Sadıqov defended his comments, EU officials responded by saying they were looking into the incident and reported that they had summoned the Azeri ambassador.

On 19 July 2023, the EU's Political and Security Committee approved Canada's proposal to contribute to EUMA. The Committee noted that Canada's involvement to the mission is a "significant event".

On 14 August 2023, EUMA said that one of its patrols was fired at near the Armenia–Azerbaijan border; Azerbaijan denied responsibility for the event.

On 3 September 2023, during an interview, prime minister Nikol Pashinyan stated that it was a strategic mistake for Armenia to solely rely on Russia to guarantee its security. Pashinyan stated, "Moscow has been unable to deliver and is in the process of winding down its role in the wider South Caucasus region" and "the Russian Federation cannot meet Armenia's security needs. This example should demonstrate to us that dependence on just one partner in security matters is a strategic mistake." Pashinyan accused Russian peacekeepers deployed to uphold the ceasefire deal of failing to do their job. Pashinyan confirmed that Armenia is trying to diversify its security arrangements, most notably with the European Union and the United States.

On 3 October 2023, following the Azerbaijani offensive in Nagorno-Karabakh and subsequent flight of Nagorno-Karabakh Armenians, French Foreign Minister Catherine Colonna asked the EU's chief diplomat, Josep Borrell, to expand the EU mission in Armenia and proposed including Armenia in an EU peace mechanism similar to that implemented by the bloc in Moldova.

On 17 October 2023, Armenian prime minister Nikol Pashinyan addressed the European Parliament. Pashinyan stated, "since February of this year, the long-term civilian mission of the European Union has been operating in Armenia, which monitors the security situation along the state border of Armenia with Azerbaijan. This is a key event through which the European Union got involved in Armenia's security agenda for the first time."

On 20 October 2023, it was announced that the EU would be taking steps to expand the mission and increase the amount of monitors based in Armenia. On 23 October 2023, the Chairman of the German Bundestag Foreign Relations Committee, Michael Roth stated, "I strongly support the EU expanding its civilian mission in Armenia for the benefit of Armenia, the safety and security of the Armenian people."

On 13 November 2023, EU Foreign Ministers approved a proposal to expand EUMA operations. Josep Borrell stated, "We decided to beef up our mission in Armenia… with more patrols in the sensitive areas of the border" and "we will explore possible support to Armenia under the European Peace Facility and an option for visa liberalization for Armenia."

=== 2024 ===
On 29 February 2024, the European Parliament adopted a report calling on the EU to immediately apply sanctions against Azerbaijan and on Azeri president Ilham Aliyev. Additionally, it suggests suspending the import of oil and natural gas from Azerbaijan in the event of any military aggression against Armenia. The report also calls for the EU to become more actively engaged in the South Caucasus, to support the signing of a peace treaty between Armenia and Azerbaijan, and offering both countries the prospect of closer integration with the EU. The adopted report calls for the strengthening and extension of EUMA's mandate, and to deploy EU monitors along Armenia's border with Turkey.

In June 2024, members of the EU's Committee for Civilian Aspects of Crisis Management (CivCom) visited EUMA headquarters and participated in patrolling border areas.

On 4 July 2024, members of the United States Commission on Security and Cooperation in Europe, Senate Committee on Foreign Relations, and the Senate Committee on Armed Services traveled to Vayots Dzor to meet with representatives of EUMA and to observe the situation on the border with Azerbaijan.

On 18 September 2024, the Young European Ambassadors of Armenia visited the EUMA operational center in Yeghegnadzor.

On 10 October 2024, EUMA hosted a delegation of representatives from the US Department of State and the US Embassy in Armenia.

On 27 November 2024, Polish President Andrzej Duda visited EUMA staff at an observation point of the mission.

=== 2025 ===
On 30 January 2025, following the decision to extend the mandate of EUMA until 19 February 2027, the Council of the European Union confirmed that "EUMA is an essential component of the EU's efforts in supporting peace and stability in the region," and that "the mandated tasks of the mission remain unchanged – EUMA is and will remain an unarmed civilian mission."

On 1 May 2025, the European People's Party (EPP) adopted a resolution supporting the extension of EUMA's mandate as a stabilizing factor in the region.

== Reactions ==
=== Positive ===
- Armenia: Armenian Foreign Minister, Ararat Mirzoyan stated, "We very much welcome the EU's decision to send a fully-fledged civilian mission to Armenia. We will readily cooperate with the mission and support its activities." Deputy Foreign Minister, Paruyr Hovhannisyan, said that the mission provides a "psychological element for the population to feel safer" in the affected border communities. The President of Armenia Vahagn Khachaturyan stated he was "deeply thankful to the EU and member states for manifestation of strong solidarity with Armenia," adding that the EUMA would "play a role in de-escalation and establishing stability and ultimately bringing peace to the region."
- Canada: Foreign Affairs Minister Mélanie Joly announced that Canada will contribute to the mission and send recruited experts. Joly said in April 2023 that she was "deeply concerned" about Azerbaijan escalating the long-running Nagorno-Karabakh dispute with Armenia.
- European Union: Josep Borrell, the European Union High Representative for Foreign Affairs and Security Policy stated, "The establishment of an EU Mission in Armenia launches a new phase in the EU's engagement in the South Caucasus. The EU will continue to support de-escalation efforts and is committed to work closely with both sides towards the ultimate goal of sustainable peace in the region."
- France: French Foreign Minister, Catherine Colonna stated that France would be happy to participate in the new mission.
- Germany: German Foreign Minister Annalena Baerbock stated that the EU mission will help ensure stability and trust in the region and said that Germany would cooperate with local experts to ensure peace and security in the area.
- Iran: The ambassador of Iran to Armenia confirmed that Iran does not oppose the activities of the EU mission along the Armenia–Azerbaijan border.
- Luxembourg: Foreign Minister of Luxembourg Jean Asselborn reaffirmed Luxembourg's support to the EU mission and the OSCE Minsk Group's efforts towards a peaceful resolution of the Nagorno-Karabakh conflict. On 22 May 2024, President of the Chamber of Deputies of Luxembourg Claude Wiseler reiterated Luxembourg's support to EUMA, called for a peace deal between Armenia and Azerbaijan, and for Azerbaijani authorities to release all Armenian prisoners of the Second Nagorno-Karabakh War.
- NATO: On 18 January 2023, the NATO Secretary General's Special Representative for the Caucasus and Central Asia, Javier Colomina Píriz, met with Foreign Minister of Armenia Ararat Mirzoyan. The sides discussed increasing Armenia–NATO cooperation and other regional issues. Special Representative Píriz expressed support for the EU Mission in Armenia.
- The Netherlands: The government of The Netherlands expressed support for the activities of the EU mission in Armenia and will explore options to facilitate the mission.
- Norway: On 21 March 2024, a Norwegian delegation led by State Secretary to the Norwegian Minister of Foreign Affairs, Eivind Vad Petersson, met with EUMA representatives and expressed support for the mission.
- Slovenia: President of the National Assembly of Slovenia, Urška Klakočar Zupančič, stated "We welcome the European Union's sustained presence in the region and express our support for the deployment of a new EU Civilian Mission in Armenia. We believe that this mission will contribute to the security of the population, foster regional stability, and build trust among the parties involved."
- United States: On 3 March 2023, the United States ambassador to Armenia Kristina Kvien met with the Head of the European Union Mission in Armenia, Markus Ritter. Ambassador Kvien confirmed that the United States strongly supports the EU Mission in Armenia.

=== Negative ===
- Azerbaijan: On 24 January 2023, the Foreign Ministry of Azerbaijan issued a statement criticizing the mission and adding that it believed that the previous mission agreed at the European Political Community summit in Prague in October 2022 was biased in favour of Armenia. Referring to the EU monitoring mission, President Aliyev said, "Whatever will happen there, the border will be where we say it should be. They [the Armenians] know that we can do it. No one will help them, not the retired French policemen from Europe, not others, not anyone else." Azerbaijani media have sought to include anti-Iranianism in narratives about EUMA.
- Russia: On 24 January 2023, Russian Foreign Minister Sergey Lavrov dismissed the EU mission as "counterproductive", arguing that it "could create additional tensions". Lavrov said on 18 January 2023 that the CSTO was prepared to send a monitoring mission to Armenia, but that the Armenian authorities had opted to cooperate with the EU instead. On 9 February 2023, the Russian ambassador to Azerbaijan stated, "the actions of the European Union are aimed at ousting Russia from the process of normalization of Armenian-Azerbaijani relations" and " in this matter, the European Union looks like a direct appendage of the United States and NATO, which consider the CIS space as a zone of opposition to Russia and are actually trying to bring a geopolitical component here." On 7 October 2024, Russia's Federal Security Service (FSB) accused the EU monitors of spying on Russian troops stationed in Armenia. Alexander Bortnikov, head of the FSB, stated "the mission's intelligence activities against Russia and our partners could be a prelude to a NATO-led peacekeeping operation designed to give the West a central role in the Armenian-Azerbaijani peace process."

== See also ==
- Accession of Armenia to the European Union
- Armenia–European Union relations
- EU Strategy for the South Caucasus
- Foreign relations of Armenia
- Foreign relations of the European Union
- Nagorno-Karabakh conflict
