= European Union Monitoring Mission Medal =

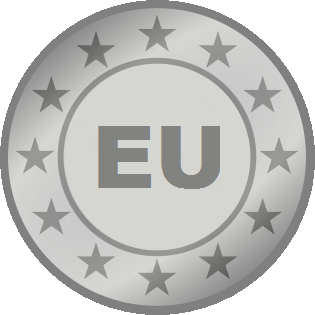
- Graphic depiction of the obverse of the medal
- Type: Service medal
- Awarded for: 30 days of cumulative service in the EU theatre of operations
- Presented by: the European Union
- Status: Mission ended 2007
- Established: December 2000
- Ribbon bar of the medal
- Related: European Community Monitor Mission Medal

The European Union Monitor Mission Medal (EUMM) is a medal which recognizes service with the European Union Monitoring Mission in the former Yugoslavia which ran from 2000 to 2007. It is the successor medal to the European Community Monitor Mission Medal.

== History ==
Originally called the European Community Monitor Mission (ECMM), the mission came about as part of the Brijuni Agreement of 8 July 1991, which ended hostilities between Slovenia and Yugoslavia. This mission was to monitor the withdrawal of the Yugoslav People's Army from Slovenia. As the conflict spread, so did the mission to monitor in Croatia and Bosnia-Herzegovina. The mission was renamed to the European Union Monitor Mission in 2000. The mission ended in 2007.

== Criteria ==
The medal was awarded for 30 days of cumulative service within the EU theatre of operations. For those members of the mission who are killed while assigned to the monitor mission, there is no minimum period of service. The medal could be awarded posthumously.

== Appearance ==
The medal is round, silver in color and 36 mm (1.4 in) in diameter. The obverse depicts twelve stars, in relief, around the outer edge with a raised rim. In the centre are the letters EU. The reverse shows a dove, in flight, with an olive branch in its beak. Around the edge are the words EUROPEAN UNION MONITORING MISSION.

== Order of wear ==
Some orders of wear are as follows:

Country	Preceding	Following
(Republic of Ireland) Ireland; Order of seniority	European Community Monitor Mission Medal	CSDP Medal–ARTEMIS
(Spain) Spain; Order of precedence	European Community Monitor Mission Medal	Western European Union Medal
