= OSCE Needs Assessment Team in Armenia =

- Location of Armenia
- Formation: 21 October 2022
- Dissolved: 27 October 2022
- Region served: Armenia
- Head: Robert Arkadiusz Tkaczyk
- Parent organization: Organization for Security and Co-operation in Europe

An OSCE Needs Assessment Team in Armenia was deployed by the Organization for Security and Co-operation in Europe (OSCE) in the territory of Armenia between 21 and 27 October 2022 following the Armenia–Azerbaijan border crisis.

== Timeline of events ==
On 18 October 2022, Foreign Minister of Armenia Ararat Mirzoyan stated that the deployment of OSCE observers in addition to 40 European Union monitoring experts to the Armenia–Azerbaijan border from the Armenian side was under discussion.

On 19 October 2022, the OSCE confirmed it would deploy a "needs assessment team" to Armenia between 21–27 October 2022, following a request made by the Government of Armenia. The team was composed of international experts and representatives of the OSCE Secretariat. The team assessed the situation in certain border areas and held consultations with international partners.

On 20 October 2022, the EU confirmed that the OSCE mission is independent and non–related to the EU's mission. However, the EU's mission will liaise with all relevant international organizations, including the OSCE.

On 22 October 2022, Foreign Minister of Armenia Ararat Mirzoyan and representatives of the Armenian Armed Forces met with the OSCE needs assessment mission, headed by the representative of Poland in the OSCE, Colonel Robert Arkadiusz Tkaczyk. Mirzoyan expressed "hope that the mission's activities, observations and final report will be a source of objective information about the situation resulting from the Azerbaijani aggression".

On 24 October 2022, the OSCE assessment mission visited the Syunik Province of Armenia. The mission met with local representatives and visited communities affected by Azerbaijan's offensive.

On 26 October 2022, the Secretary of the Security Council of Armenia, Armen Grigoryan met with the OSCE mission. During the meeting, Colonel Robert Arkadiusz Tkaczyk expressed confidence that the OSCE will continue to deepen cooperation with Armenia.

On 27 October 2022, the OSCE mission met with Armenia's Deputy Foreign Minister Paruyr Hovhannisyan. The mission presented its work they carried out and damages they recorded from the conflict. In turn, Hovhannisyan highlighted the "engagement of the OSCE, as a pan-European security organization, in the prevention and settlement of conflicts".

== Reactions ==
=== Positive ===
- Armenia: Armenian Foreign Minister Ararat Mirzoyan expressed confidence that the OSCE Minsk Group would assist in promoting a peaceful settlement of the Nagorno-Karabakh conflict.
- France: Former French ambassador to Armenia Jonathan Lacôte stated, "This decision marks the result of the actions by the French Minister for Europe and Foreign Affairs, Catherine Colonna, after the armed attacks of Azerbaijan on the Armenian territory. The deployment of this OSCE mission will make an additional contribution to the respect of Armenia's security and territorial integrity."
- United States: The US mission to the OSCE stated, "The United States strongly supports the activation of the OSCE’s confidence-building and conflict prevention instruments, including the establishment of a needs assessment team on the territory of Armenia."

=== Negative ===
- Azerbaijan: The Foreign Ministry of Azerbaijan criticized the mission believing that it did not have an official mandate and that its reports should not be considered to be official OSCE documents.
- Russia: Russian Foreign Ministry spokeswoman Maria Zakharova stated, "These steps by the West threaten the balance that was achieved in difficult conditions through agreements between the leaders of Russia, Azerbaijan, and Armenia".
- Turkey: Turkish Foreign Minister Mevlut Cavusoglu denounced the "unacceptable" decision, saying it was against the OSCE's own operating rules.

== See also ==
- Armenia–European Union relations
- Armenia–OSCE relations
- European Union Monitoring Capacity to Armenia
- Foreign relations of Armenia
- Nagorno-Karabakh conflict
- OSCE Minsk Group
- Permanent Mission of Armenia to the OSCE
