= European Community Monitor Mission Medal =

- Type: Service medal
- Awarded for: 21 days of continuous, or 30 days of cumulative service for the European Community Monitor Mission
- Presented by: the European Community
- Status: Mission changed to the European Union Monitoring Mission 2000
- Ribbon bar of the medal
- Related: European Union Monitoring Mission Medal

The European Community Monitor Mission Medal is a medal which recognizes service with the European Community Monitor Mission in the former Yugoslavia which ran from 1991 to 2007. The mission came about as part of the Brijuni Agreement of 8 July 1991, which ended hostilities between Slovenia and Yugoslavia. This mission was to monitor the withdrawal of the Yugoslav People's Army from Slovenia. As the conflict spread, so did the mission to monitor in Croatia and Bosnia-Herzegovina.

== Criteria ==
The medal was awarded for at least 21 days of continuous, or 30 days of cumulative service within the theatre of operations. For those members of the mission who are killed while assigned to the monitor mission, there is no minimum period of service. The medal would be awarded posthumously.

== Appearance ==
The medal is round, silver in color and 36mm in diameter. The obverse depicts twelve stars, in relief, around the outer edge with a raised rim. The center portrays a map of former Yugoslavia with the words “EC Monitor Mission” or “EC Task Force” in the centre. The reverse shows a dove, in flight, with an olive branch in its beak.
