= 1st European Political Community Summit =

1st European Political Community Summit První summit Evropského politického společenství
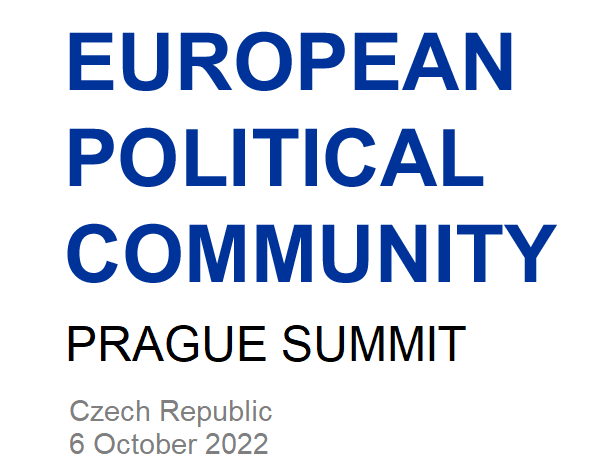

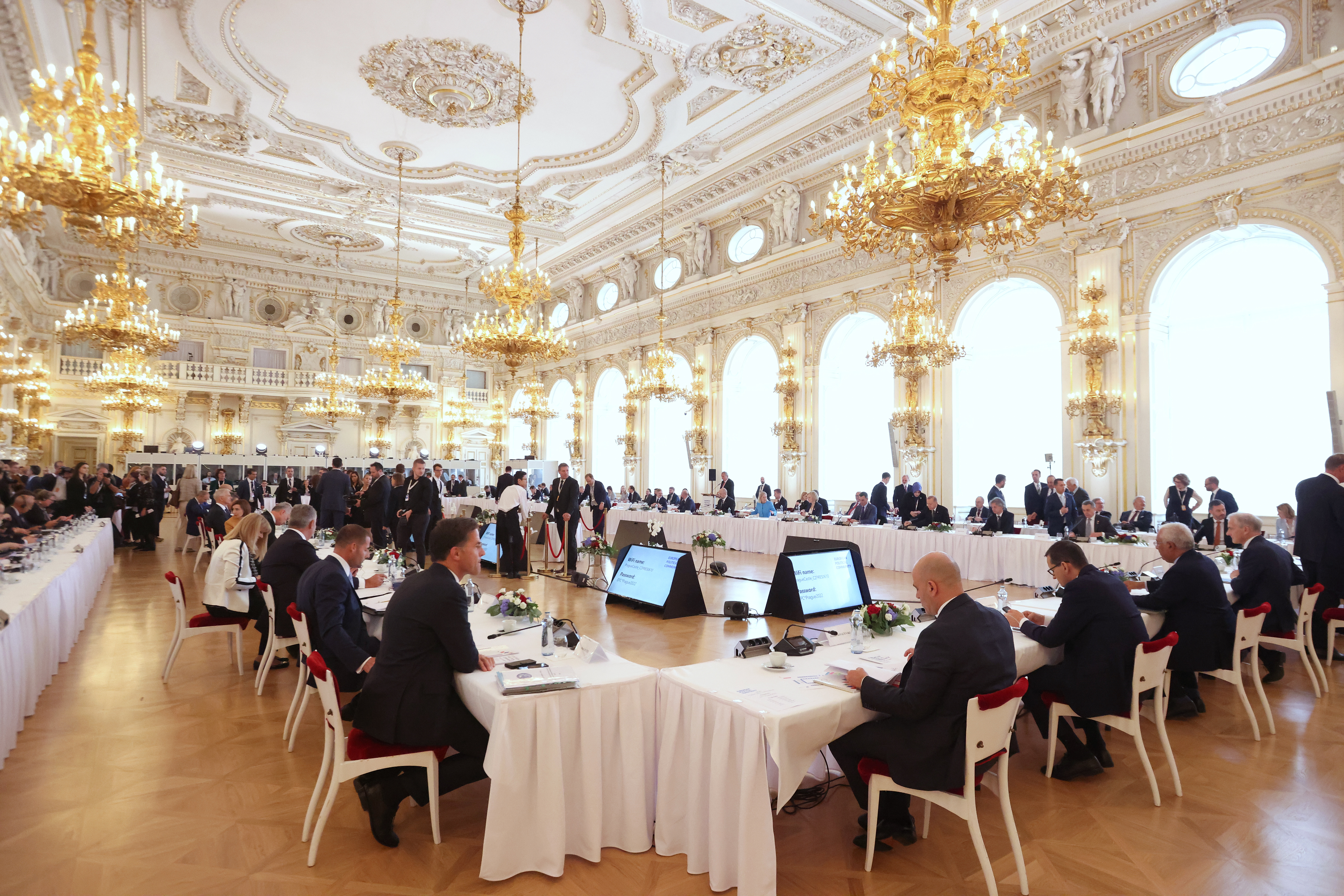
- Plenary session of the 1st EPC Summit in Prague
- Host country: Czech Republic
- Date: 6 October 2022
- Cities: Prague
- Venues: Prague Castle
- Participants: 44 states
- Chair: Petr Fiala, Prime Minister of the Czech Republic
- Follows: inaugural
- Precedes: 2nd
- Website: EU Council

The First European Political Community Summit was the inaugural meeting of the European Political Community held on 6 October 2022 in Prague, Czech Republic. It was attended by the heads of state or government of forty-four European countries. Russia and Belarus were not invited, while arrangements for Andorra, Monaco and San Marino were yet to be finalized.

== Aims ==
The stated aims of the summit were as follows:

- To foster political dialogue and cooperation to address issues of common interest
- To strengthen the security, stability and prosperity of the European continent

== Schedule and agenda ==
The summit took place on 6 October 2022 and was structured as follows:

- 12.00 - Arrivals, doorsteps and welcome
- 13.00 - Opening plenary session
- 14.00 - Roundtable discussions on either peace and security or energy, climate and the economic situation
- 16.00 - Bilateral meetings
- 19.30 - Closing plenary session
- 21.45 - Press conference

The summit was followed by an informal meeting of the European Council which took place the next day also at Prague Castle.

== Participants ==
Countries that were invited to the summit

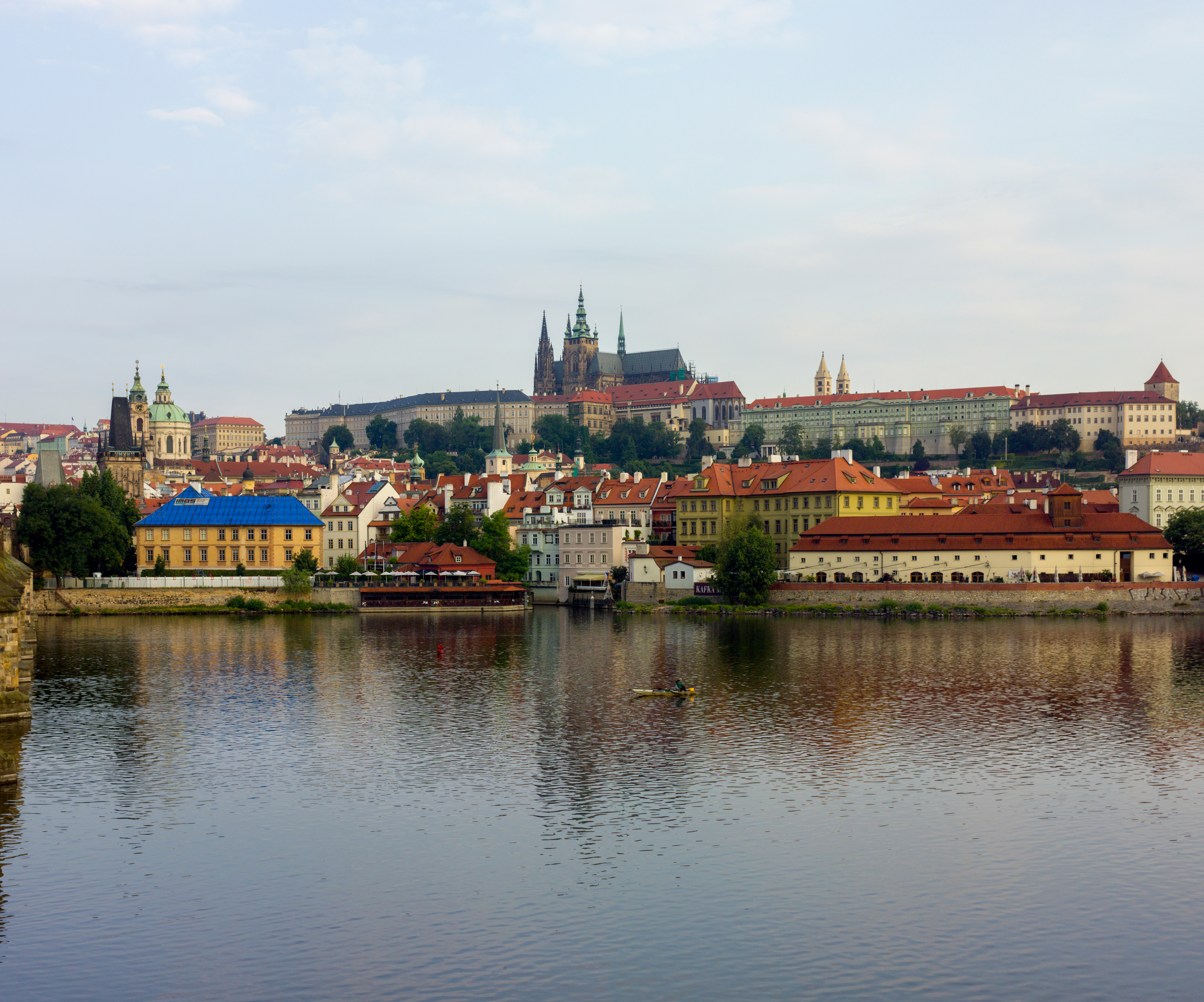
Prague Castle hosted the 1st EPC summit on 6 October 2022

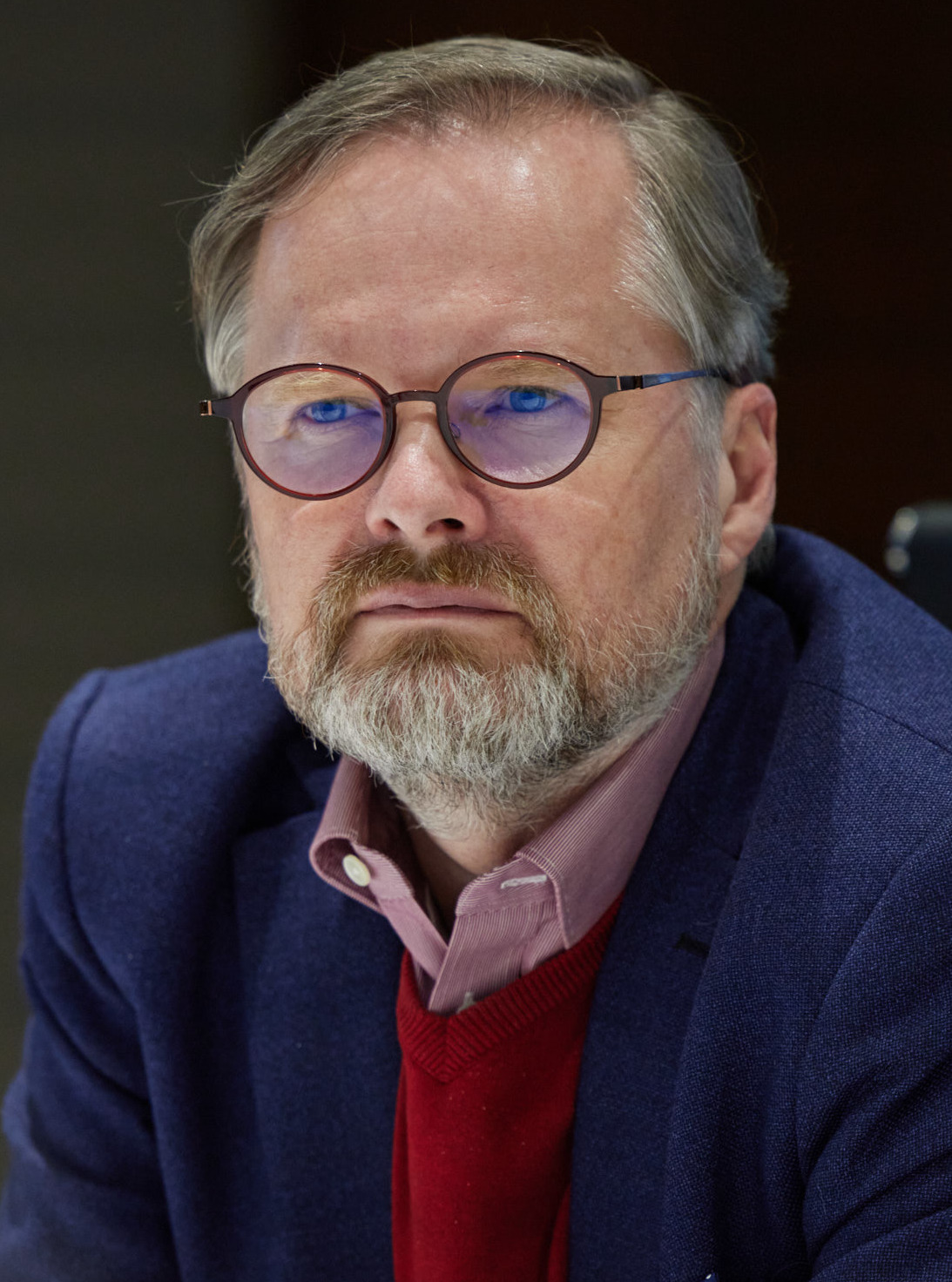
Czech prime minister Petr Fiala chaired the plenary sessions of the summit

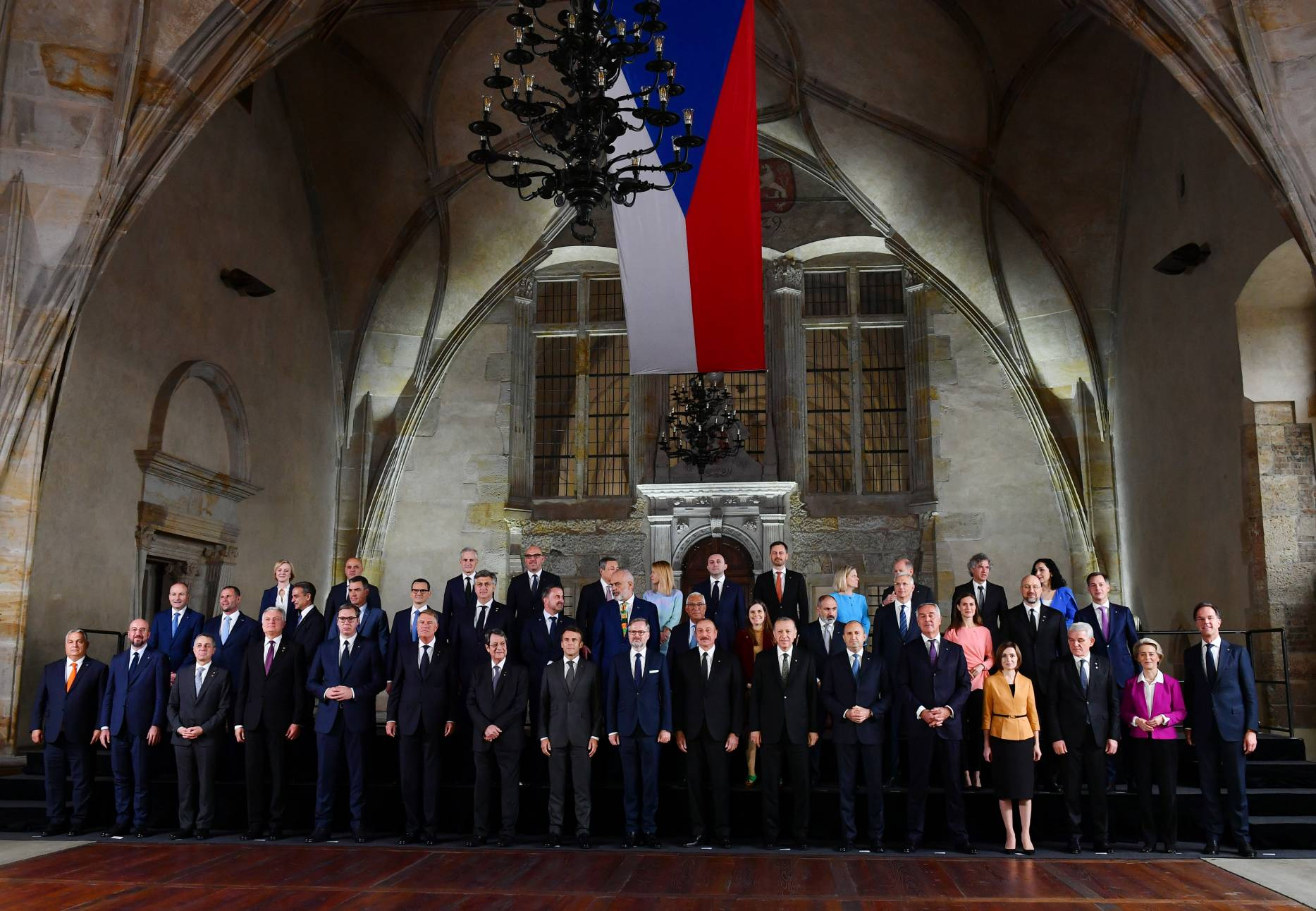
European leaders at the 1st EPC Summit

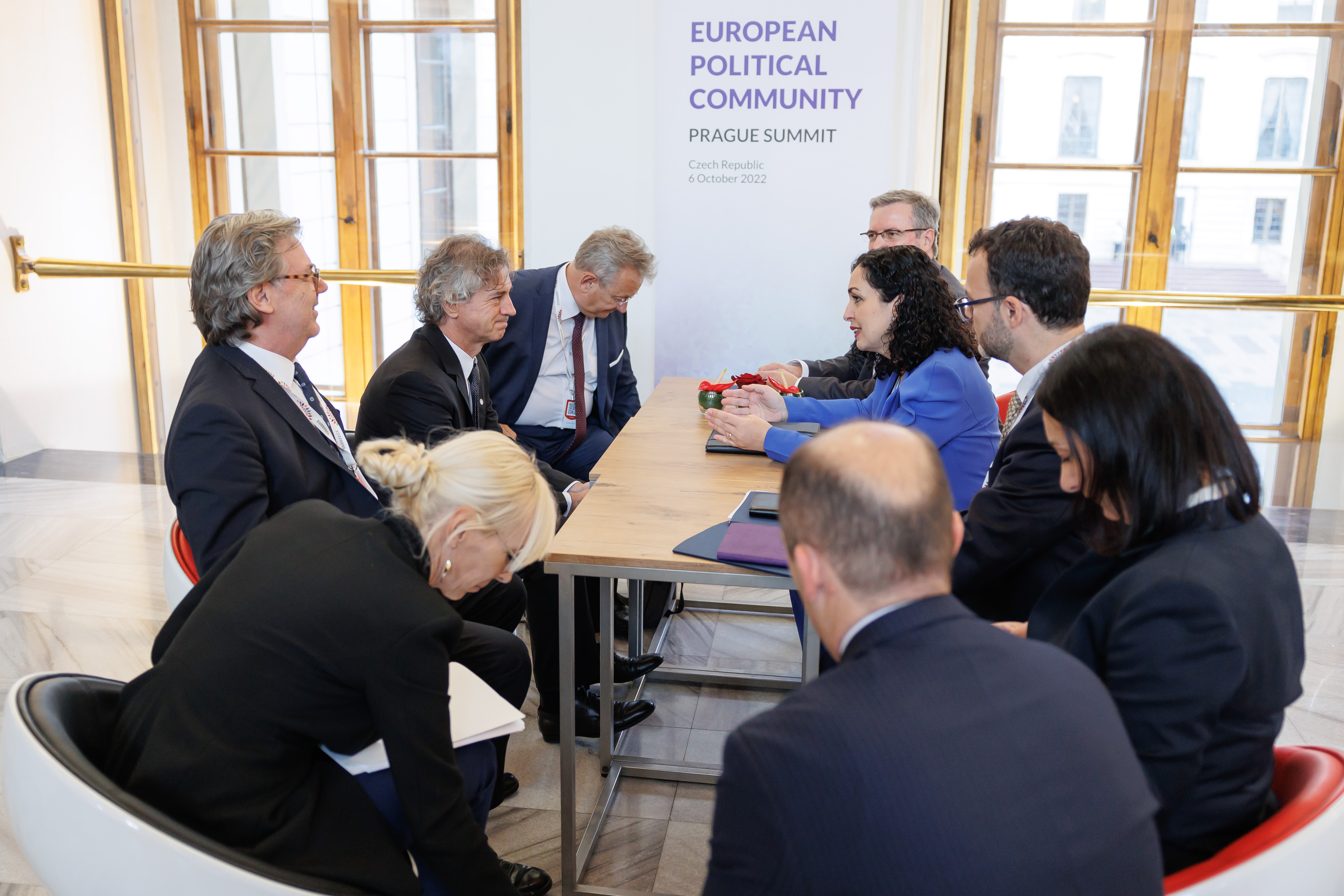
Bilateral meetings at 1st EPC Summit

The following heads of state/heads of government participated in the summit:

Member		Represented by	Title
(Albania)	Albania	Edi Rama	Prime Minister
(Armenia)	Armenia	Nikol Pashinyan	Prime Minister
(Austria)	Austria	Karl Nehammer	Chancellor
(Azerbaijan)	Azerbaijan	Ilham Aliyev	President
(Belgium)	Belgium	Alexander De Croo	Prime Minister
(Bosnia and Herzegovina)	Bosnia and Herzegovina	Šefik Džaferović	Chairman of the Presidency
(Bulgaria)	Bulgaria	Rumen Radev	President
(Croatia)	Croatia	Andrej Plenković	Prime Minister
(Cyprus)	Cyprus	Nicos Anastasiades	President
(Czech Republic)	Czech Republic	Petr Fiala	Prime Minister
(Denmark)	Denmark	Mette Frederiksen	Prime Minister
(Estonia)	Estonia	Kaja Kallas	Prime Minister
(European Union)	European Union		
(European Union)	European Union	Charles Michel	President of the European Council
(European Union)	European Union	Ursula von der Leyen	President of the European Commission
(Finland)	Finland	Sanna Marin	Prime Minister
(France)	France	Emmanuel Macron	President
(Georgia (country))	Georgia	Irakli Garibashvili	Prime Minister
(Germany)	Germany	Olaf Scholz	Chancellor
(Greece)	Greece	Kyriakos Mitsotakis	Prime Minister
(Hungary)	Hungary	Viktor Orbán	Prime Minister
(Iceland)	Iceland	Katrín Jakobsdóttir	Prime Minister
(Republic of Ireland)	Ireland	Micheál Martin	Taoiseach
(Italy)	Italy	Mario Draghi	Prime Minister
(Kosovo)	Kosovo	Vjosa Osmani	President
(Latvia)	Latvia	Krišjānis Kariņš	Prime Minister
(Liechtenstein)	Liechtenstein	Daniel Risch	Prime Minister
(Lithuania)	Lithuania	Gitanas Nausėda	President
(Luxembourg)	Luxembourg	Xavier Bettel	Prime Minister
(Malta)	Malta	Robert Abela	Prime Minister
(Moldova)	Moldova	Maia Sandu	President
(Montenegro)	Montenegro	Milo Đukanović	President
(Netherlands)	Netherlands	Mark Rutte	Prime Minister
(North Macedonia)	North Macedonia	Dimitar Kovacevski	Prime Minister
(Norway)	Norway	Jonas Gahr Støre	Prime Minister
(Poland)	Poland	Mateusz Morawiecki	Prime Minister
(Portugal)	Portugal	António Costa	Prime Minister
(Romania)	Romania	Klaus Iohannis	President
(Serbia)	Serbia	Aleksandar Vučić	President
(Slovakia)	Slovakia	Eduard Heger	Prime Minister
(Slovenia)	Slovenia	Robert Golob	Prime Minister
(Spain)	Spain	Pedro Sánchez	Prime Minister
(Sweden)	Sweden	Magdalena Andersson	Prime Minister
(Switzerland)	Switzerland	Ignazio Cassis	President
(Turkey)	Turkey	Recep Tayyip Erdoğan	President
(Ukraine)	Ukraine		
(Ukraine)	Ukraine	Denys Shmyhal	Prime Minister
(Ukraine)	Ukraine	Volodymyr Zelenskyy (via video link)	President
(United Kingdom)	United Kingdom	Liz Truss	Prime Minister

== Outcomes ==
=== Future summits ===
According to a press release issued after the summit, the main focus of discussions was in regard to security, the 2022 Russian invasion of Ukraine and the ongoing energy crisis in Europe. It was also agreed that the following summit will be held in the spring of 2023 in Moldova and would focus on securing key infrastructure such as pipelines, cables, and satellites; stepping up the fight against cyberattacks, creating a support fund for Ukraine, working out a common, pan-European energy policy and looking into the possibility of having more university and student exchanges.

=== Armenia-Azerbaijan relations ===
At the summit, Armenian Prime Minister Nikol Pashinyan and Azeri President Ilham Aliyev met in an attempt to resolve the long running Nagorno-Karabakh conflict and the recent Armenia–Azerbaijan border crisis. Following the meeting, the two parties re-affirmed their commitment to upholding the United Nations Charter and the Alma-Ata Protocol, through which they recognize each other's territorial integrity and sovereignty. They also agreed to the deployment of a European Union led mission to be deployed on the Armenian side of their shared border for a period of two months, starting in October 2022 with a view to build confidence and to contribute to the border delimitation process. This mission ultimately led to the deployment of a longer term European Union Mission in Armenia.

=== United Kingdom ===
At the summit, the United Kingdom agreed to re-engage with the North Seas Energy Cooperation (NSEC) which it had previously left in January 2020. At a fringe event, British Prime Minister Liz Truss committed to joining the Permanent Structured Cooperation (PESCO) and its Military Mobility programme. The summit also resulted in a resetting of the relations between the UK and France. During bilateral talks at the summit, Liz Truss and French President Emmanuel Macron reaffirmed the strong and historic ties between their two countries and the two agreed to hold a UK-France Summit in 2023. Prior to the summit, Truss had stated that "the jury was out" on whether Macron was a friend or foe, however during the summit Truss called Macron a friend.

=== Common youth policy ===
At the summit, the leaders of Albania, Serbia and Ireland suggested the idea of having a much more integrated university policy.

== See also ==
- European integration
- Pan-European identity
- Politics of Europe
- 2022 Czech Presidency of the Council of the European Union
