= Western European Union Mission Service Medal =

International military decoration

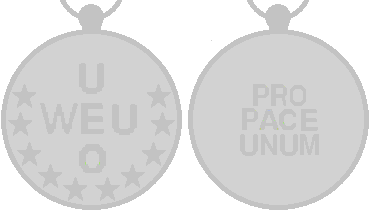
- Depiction of obverse and reverse of the medal
- Type: Campaign or service medal
- Awarded for: Service in designated WEU military missions
- Presented by: Western European Union
- Eligibility: Citizens of WEU member countries
- Status: No longer awarded. Superseded by European Security and Defence Policy Service Medal.
- Established: 20 December 1994
- Ribbon of the medal

The Western European Union Mission Service Medal is an international military decoration awarded to individuals who served with Western European Union (WEU) military missions.

== History ==
The Western European Union was formed by the Modified Brussels Treaty. Belgium, France, Luxembourg, the Netherlands and the United Kingdom were the original signers of the treaty. It was further amended by the Paris Agreements on 23 October 1954, which modified and completed the treaty, adding Germany and Italy to the treaty. Part of this framework was a mutual defence pact amongst the signatories.

The WEU first acted in military operations in the context of the Iran–Iraq War. In 1987, mines were laid in the Persian Gulf, restricting the freedom of navigation in international waters. A joint mine sweeping effort was undertaken by member nations of the WEU.

The WEU next took part in military operations during the Yugoslav Wars in 1992. The WEU undertook Operation Sharp Fence starting in 1992, in tandem with NATO who was executing Operation Maritime Guard. WEU and NATO joined their operations together in a single command as Operation Sharp Guard in June 1993.

== Appearance ==
The medal is circular, made of silver-coloured oxidised metal, 36 mm in diameter. The obverse of the medal displays the letters WEU arranged horizontally for "Western European Union". Above the letter E is the letter U and below the letter O. UEO is the acronym for the French equivalent, Union de l'Europe Occidentale. Below the acronyms, arranged along the edge, are ten five pointed stars. The reverse bears the Latin words in relief, PRO PACE UNUM, meaning "one for peace", or idiomatically as "united for peace".

The suspension ribbon of the medal is blue with a central stripe of yellow-gold. Worn on the ribbon are clasps naming the mission for which the medal is awarded. The service ribbon is the same as the suspension ribbon, utilizing miniature versions of the clasps.

== Order of wear ==
Some orders of wear are as follows:

Country	Preceding	Following
(Norway) Norway; Order of wear	United Nations Service Medal for UNPREDEP	United Nations Service Medal for MINUGUA
(Spain) Spain; Order of precedence	Aceh Monitoring Mission Medal	CSDP Medal
(United Kingdom) United Kingdom; Order of approval for wear	NATO Medal for the former Yugoslavia	United Nations Service Medal for UNOMIG

== See also ==
- Common Security and Defence Policy Service Medal
