= European Union Monitoring Mission in Georgia =

Unarmed peacekeeping mission of the European Union in Georgia

- Map of Europe with the European Union in green and Georgia in orange.
- Formation: October 1, 2008; 18 years ago
- Headquarters: Tbilisi, Georgia
- Head of Mission: Bettina Patricia Boughani
- Parent organization: European Union
- Budget: €47 million (2022/2024)
- Staff: 200
- Website: www.eumm.eu

The European Union Monitoring Mission in Georgia (EUMM Georgia) is an unarmed peacekeeping mission operated by the European Union in Georgia. The EUMM was conceived in September 2008 following the EU-mediated ceasefire agreement, which ended the Russo-Georgian War. The mission has around 200 monitors from EU member states and operates with a budget of over €47 million (2022/2024). Its headquarters are in Tbilisi, with field offices in Gori, Mtskheta and Zugdidi.

The EUMM started its monitoring activities on 1 October 2008 and has since been patrolling both day and night, particularly in areas adjacent to the Administrative Boundary Lines with the Russian-backed separatist regions of Abkhazia and South Ossetia. The organization's mission is to ensure that there is no return to hostilities, to facilitate the resumption of a safe and normal life for the local communities living in the areas adjacent to Abkhazia and South Ossetia, and to build confidence among the conflict parties.

TEUMM's mandate is valid throughout all of Georgia. However, in violation of the 2008 ceasefire agreement, Russia and the self-proclaimed Abkhazian and South Ossetian authorities have so far denied EUMM's access to territories under separatist control. EUMM operates under the Common Security and Defence Policy.

== Background ==
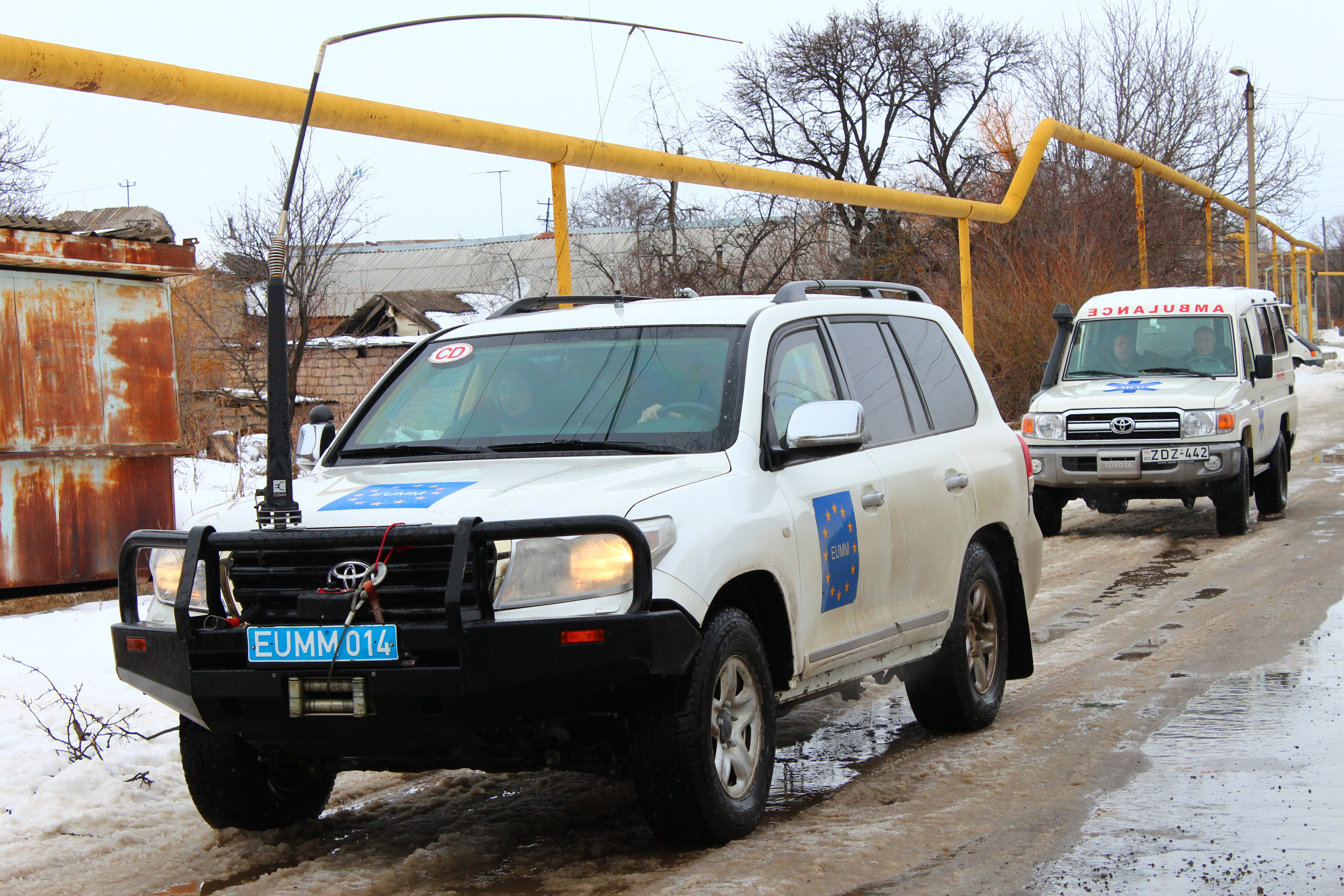
The EUMM patrols the South Ossetian administration boundary line in armored SUVs in February 2012.

Following the Russo-Georgian War in August 2008, the EU declared on 15 September 2008 to deploy a monitoring mission to Georgia. The main objectives of the mission is to fulfill the European commitment in re-establishing stability and normalisation following the crisis through an observer mission that consists of over 200 field specialists that conduct routine inspections within the stipulated zone of the mission that includes Georgia, South Ossetia and Abkhazia. The mission is to observe the compliance with the six-point agreement between Georgia and Russia signed during 12–16 August 2008. The mission started its monitoring activities on 1 October 2008, beginning with oversight of the withdrawal of Russian armed forces from the areas adjacent to South Ossetia and Abkhazia.

== Mandate ==
The Mission's mandate consists of stabilisation, normalisation and confidence building, as well as reporting to the EU in order to inform European policy-making and thus contribute to the future EU engagement in the region. Originally authorised for 12 months, the mandate was extended five times, through to 14 December 2018. EUMM is mandated to cover the whole territory of Georgia, within the country's internationally recognised borders, but the de facto authorities in Abkhazia and South Ossetia have so far denied access to the territories under their control.

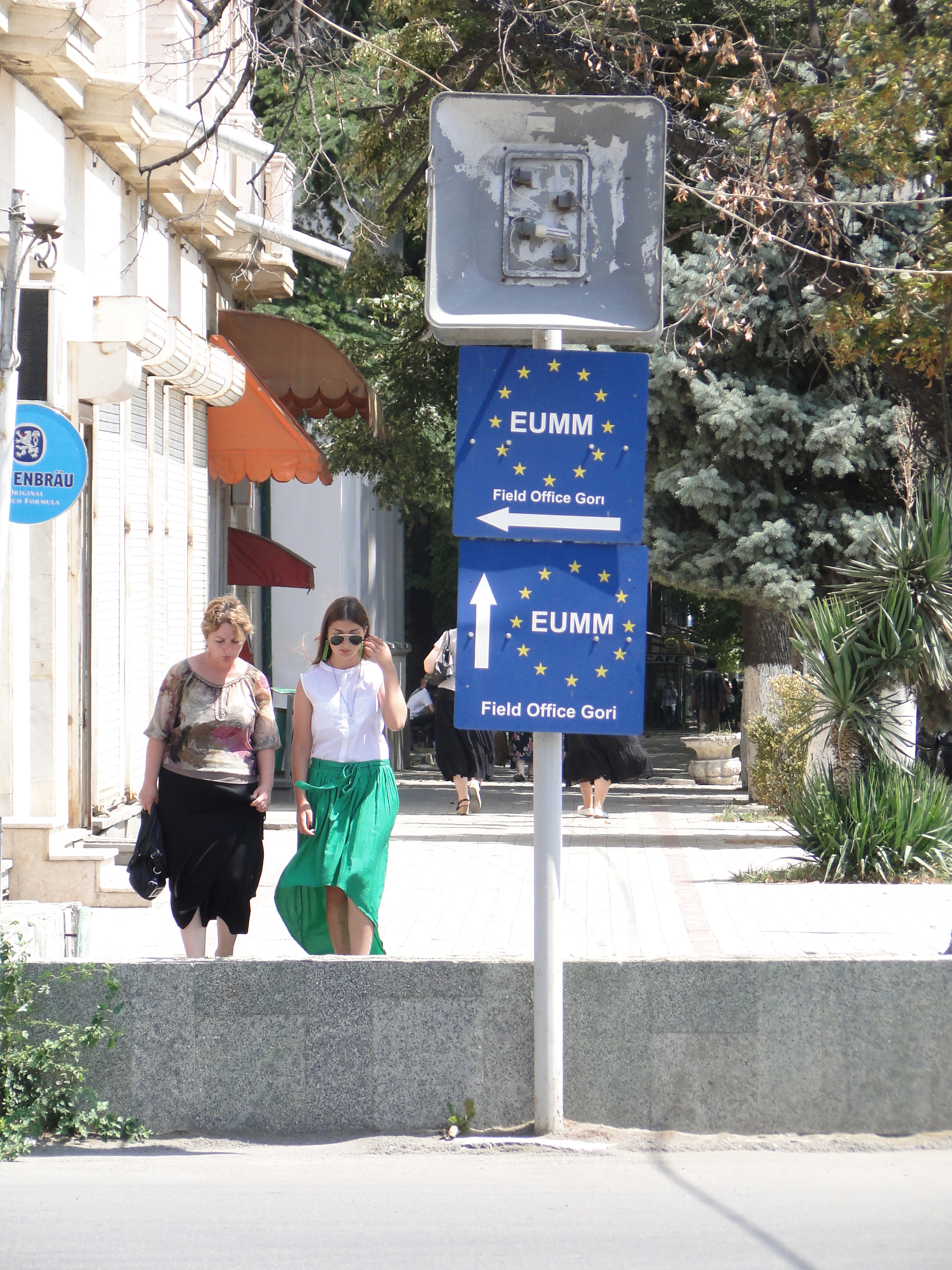
EUMM signs

The Mission is working to prevent the renewal of an armed conflict, as well as to help make the areas adjacent to the Administrative Boundary Lines of the breakaway regions of Abkhazia and South Ossetia safe and secure for the local residents. The Mission wants to contribute to and create conditions whereby civilians can cross the Administrative Boundary Lines of Abkhazia and South Ossetia in both directions without fear and obstacles, thus reducing the detrimental effects of the dividing lines. All 27 EU Member States contribute personnel, both women and men, from a variety of civilian, police and military backgrounds. The Mission has its headquarters in Tbilisi and three regional field offices in Mtskheta, Gori and Zugdidi.

The budget for the mission – with a staff of over 200 EU monitors – was €47,141,684 during "2022/2024".

== Timeline ==
On 25 April 2012, the government of Abkhazia declared the head of the EUMM in Georgia, Andrzej Tyszkiewicz, persona non grata, accusing him of being biased towards the Georgian position in the conflict.

In 2013, the EUMM established the 'EU special prize for peace journalism' to honour journalists that contribute, through their reporting, to the peaceful relations in Georgia.

Since 2015 the Mission expanded its confidence-building activities by creating a 'Confidence Building Facility' to support small scale confidence-building projects between the conflicting parties

== EUMM deployment to Armenia ==
On 17 October 2022, the EU announced that 40 observers stationed in Georgia with EUMM would be relocated to Armenia to serve in the European Union Monitoring Capacity to Armenia for a period of 2 months. The observers monitored the Armenia–Azerbaijan border following the 2022 border crisis. The EUMM took operational steps to ensure its monitoring capacity in Georgia was not impacted. The mission concluded its activities on 19 December 2022.

On 20 December 2022, the European Council and the Government of Armenia agreed that EUMM Georgia would deploy its personnel to serve in the EU Planning Assistance Team in Armenia. The mandate of the EU Planning Assistance Team in Armenia became active on 20 December 2022. The EU Planning Assistance Team was superseded by a CSDP European Union Mission in Armenia on 23 January 2023.

== See also ==
- List of military and civilian missions of the European Union
- European Union Monitoring Mission in the former Yugoslavia
