= EU Strategy for the South Caucasus =

- Ratified: 20 May 2010
- Location: Strasbourg, France
- Commissioned by: European Parliament
- Subject: Relations between the South Caucasus and the European Union

Official website
- www.europarl.europa

The EU Strategy for the South Caucasus is a long-term strategy which is directed to create a secure political, economical and social environment next to the eastern borders of the European Union. This is an objective of the European Neighbourhood Policy, and forthcoming Eastern Partnership Program.

== Background ==
On 8 December 2009, the EU Foreign Affairs Council reaffirmed its intention to promote stability, co-operation, prosperity, democracy and good governance throughout the South Caucasus region, including through technical assistance programs. An extensive report was subsequently drafted and debated. The motion was adopted on 17 March 2010 by the European Parliament Committee on International Trade and was adopted on 8 April 2010 by the European Parliament Committee on Industry, Research and Energy. The motion was passed by a majority vote of the European Parliament on 20 May 2010.

== Strategy ==
Members of the Eastern Partnership

Considering that the South Caucasus region is threatened with the Abkhazia, South Ossetia and Nagorno-Karabakh conflicts, the EU policy towards the region focuses primarily on finding lasting solutions to these conflicts and ensuring peace and stability in the region. The strategy also supports the continued economic and political integration of the three South Caucasus countries with the EU. The strategy highlights the necessity of signing Association Agreement's with DCFTA's as a way to promote economic development, enhance regional integration, increase trade and eradicate poverty. The strategy reaffirms the importance of the Euronest Parliamentary Assembly as a crucial multilateral mechanism of intensified interparliamentary dialogue between the European Parliament and the EU's Eastern partners, including Armenia, Azerbaijan and Georgia, with the aim of bringing these countries closer to the EU. Finally, the report supports the long-term engagement of the EU and other organizations like the Organization of the Black Sea Economic Cooperation in the region as a means to boost cross-border cooperation, maintain peace and respect for human rights, and achieve sustainable growth and prosperity.

== Potential EU membership ==
Countries that could join the European Union Current members Candidate countries Applicant / potential candidate countries Membership possible Membership not possible

The report confirmed the prospects to deepen bilateral relations with the countries of the South Caucasus by establishing new contractual relations in the form of Association Agreements. The EU expects the implementation of Association Agreements by Armenia, Azerbaijan, and Georgia to accelerate the process of economic and political integration with the EU. The strategy also highlights the geopolitical importance of the region to the EU, and that developing cooperation with the countries of the South Caucasus should be given high priority. The strategy also calls for the European Commission to establish free trade agreements with all three South Caucasus countries.

== EU approach towards the Georgian conflict ==
The EU reiterates its unconditional support for the sovereignty, territorial integrity and inviolability of the internationally recognized borders of Georgia, and calls on Russia to respect them; encourages the Georgian authorities to make further efforts to achieve a settlement of Georgia's internal conflicts in Abkhazia and South Ossetia.

The EU is seriously concerned about the use of ethnic cleansing as a prelude to the Russian recognition of South Ossetian and Abkhazian statehood; notes with satisfaction that the international community remains united in its rejection of the unilateral declaration of independence; calls on Russia to honor its commitment in the Ceasefire Agreement to withdraw its troops to the positions held before the outbreak of the August 2008 war and to cease its blocking of EUMM Georgia access to South Ossetia and Abkhazia; EU stresses the importance of protecting the safety and rights of the ethnic Georgians still living within the breakaway regions, promoting respect for displaced persons' right of return under safe and dignified conditions, achieving a reduction in the Iron Curtain character of the de facto borders and obtaining possibilities for the EU and other international actors to assist people within the two regions; underlines the need for more clearly identified short- and medium-term objectives in this respect.

== EU approach towards the Nagorno-Karabakh conflict ==
Currently, the EU has a limited stance towards the Nagorno-Karabakh conflict. However, the EU has repeatedly called for a lasting solution to the conflict.

In its Resolution on Strategy for the South Caucasus, the EU calls on the parties to intensify their peace talk efforts for the purpose of a settlement, to show a more constructive attitude and to abandon preferences to perpetuate the status quo created by force and with no international legitimacy, creating in this way instability and prolonging the suffering of the war-affected populations; condemns the idea of a military solution and the heavy consequences of military force already used, and calls on both parties to avoid any further breaches of the 1994 ceasefire.

The EU is seriously concerned that hundreds of thousands of refugees and IDPs who fled their homes during or in connection with the Nagorno-Karabakh war remain displaced and denied their rights, including the right to return, property rights and the right to personal security; calls on all parties to unambiguously and unconditionally recognize these rights, the need for their prompt realization and for a prompt solution to this problem that respects the principles of international law; demands, in this regard, the withdrawal of Armenian forces from all occupied territories of Azerbaijan, accompanied by deployment of international forces to be organized with respect of the UN Charter to provide the necessary security guarantees in a period of transition, which will ensure the security of the population of Nagorno-Karabakh and allow the displaced persons to return to their homes and further conflicts caused by homelessness to be prevented.

== EU Activities to Support Democratization, Good Governance and the Rule of Law ==
Support to good governance, the rule of law and democratization has been constantly identified as a core priority in major policy documents in all three countries. In the Country Reports prepared by the European Commission in 2005, political, rule of law and human rights issues were highlighted as areas where reforms should markedly be strengthened and where co-operation with the EU should develop for all three Caucasus countries. They were subsequently identified as core priorities in the Action Plans signed with Armenia, Azerbaijan and Georgia in 2006.

The EU policy stresses that democratization, good governance, political pluralism, the rule of law, human rights and fundamental freedoms are of paramount importance for determining the future relations of Armenia, Azerbaijan and Georgia with the EU; calls for renewed efforts by the countries to implement in full the ENP Action Plans and calls on the commission to continue to assist them in such efforts; is concerned by the limited progress made by the countries in the South Caucasus region in this area, as shown in the Commission 2009 progress reports and reflected in Council of Europe recommendations; welcomes the initiation of the human rights dialogues between the EU and Georgia and Armenia and invites Azerbaijan and the EU to finalise discussions on an equivalent co-operation structure.

== Recent developments ==
In July 2021, High Representative of the Union for Foreign Affairs and Security Policy Josep Borrell stated that the EU should be more engaged in the Caucasus region and seek to further strengthen economic and political cooperation in the area. EU Foreign Ministers from Austria, Lithuania and Romania travelled to Armenia, Azerbaijan and Georgia on the High Representatives behalf. The delegation, led by European Union Special Representative Toivo Klaar met with the leaders of all three South Caucasus countries. The delegation stressed that the EU would take a more active role in addressing the conflicts in the Eastern Neighbourhood. The delegates also reiterated the importance of the Eastern Partnership in bringing the three partners closer to the EU. In return, leaders from each partner country expressed appreciation for the EU's visit and stressed their readiness to cooperate with the EU on regional economic development and that they value the EU's role towards contributing to reconciliation and conflict resolution.

On 6 October 2022, Prime Minister of Armenia Nikol Pashinyan and President of Azerbaijan Ilham Aliyev met at the European Political Community summit in Prague in an attempt to resolve the long running Nagorno-Karabakh conflict and the recent Armenia–Azerbaijan border crisis. Following the meeting, it was stated that the two parties agreed to the deployment of a European Union led mission, which would be deployed on the Armenian side of their shared border for a period of two months, starting in October 2022. The stated aim of the mission is to "build confidence and, through its reports, to contribute to the border commissions" work towards delimitation of the border between the two parties.

== See also ==
- Armenia–European Union relations
- Accession of Armenia to the European Union
- Association Trio
- Azerbaijan–European Union relations
- European integration
- Foreign relations of the European Union
- Georgia–European Union relations
- Accession of Georgia to the European Union
- Post-Soviet conflicts
- Potential enlargement of the European Union
