= Brioni Agreement =

1991 document on the future of Yugoslavia

- Map of Slovenia (green), Croatia (pink) and the remainder of Yugoslavia (pale yellow) at the time of the Brioni Agreement
- Drafted: 5 July 1991
- Signed: 7 July 1991
- Location: Brijuni, Croatia
- Mediators: Hans van den Broek; João de Deus Pinheiro; Jacques Poos
- Signatories: Franjo Tuđman; Janez Drnovšek; Milan Kučan; Ante Marković; Budimir Lončar; Petar Gračanin; Stane Brovet; Bogić Bogićević; Branko Kostić; Stjepan Mesić; Vasil Tupurkovski
- Parties: Republic of Croatia; Republic of Slovenia; SFR Yugoslavia

Full text
- hr:Brijunska deklaracija at Wikisource

The Brioni Agreement, also known as the Brioni Declaration (Croatian: Brijunska deklaracija, Serbian: Brionska deklaracija, Serbian Cyrillic: Брионска декларација, Slovene: Brionska deklaracija) is a document signed by representatives of Slovenia, Croatia, and Yugoslavia under the political sponsorship of the European Community (EC) on the Brijuni Islands on 7 July 1991. The agreement sought to create an environment in which further negotiations on the future of Yugoslavia could take place. However, ultimately it isolated the federal prime minister Ante Marković in his efforts to preserve Yugoslavia, and effectively stopped any form of federal influence over Slovenia. This meant the Yugoslav People's Army (JNA) would focus on combat in Croatia, creating a precedent of redrawing international borders and staking the EC's interest in resolving the Yugoslav crisis.

The agreement put an end to hostilities between the Yugoslav and Slovene forces in the Ten-Day War. Slovenia and Croatia agreed to suspend activities stemming from their 25 June declarations of independence for a period of three months. The document also resolved border control and customs inspection issues regarding Slovenia's borders, resolved air-traffic control responsibility and mandated an exchange of prisoners of war. The Brioni Agreement also formed the basis for an observer mission to monitor implementation of the agreement in Slovenia. Eleven days after the agreement was made, the federal government pulled the JNA out of Slovenia. Conversely, the agreement made no mitigating impact on fighting in Croatia.

== Background ==
On 23 June 1991, as Slovenia and Croatia prepared to declare their independence during the breakup of Yugoslavia, the European Community (EC) foreign ministers decided the EC member states would not extend diplomatic recognition to the two states. The EC viewed the declarations as unilateral moves and offered assistance in negotiations regarding the future of the SFR Yugoslavia instead. At the same time, the EC decided to suspend direct talks with Slovenia and Croatia. The move was welcomed by the Yugoslav federal government. Slovenia and Croatia declared independence on 25 June, and the Yugoslav People's Army (JNA) units began to deploy from its bases in Slovenia the next day. On 27 June, armed conflict broke out as the JNA and the Territorial Defence Force of Slovenia (TDS) began fighting over control of Slovenia's border posts, in what became the Ten-Day War.

A three-strong EC delegation made three visits to the region in late June and early July to negotiate a political agreement which would facilitate further negotiations. The delegation consisted of the foreign ministers of Luxembourg, as the incumbent holder of the EC presidency, and Italy and the Netherlands, as the previous and future holders of that office. The delegation members were Jacques Poos (Luxembourg), Gianni de Michelis (Italy), and Hans van den Broek (Netherlands). Prior to the delegation's arrival in Belgrade, Poos told reporters that the EC would take charge of the crisis. There, the delegation was met by Serbian president Slobodan Milošević who dismissed the prospect of Croatia leaving the Yugoslav federation because its population contained 600,000 Serbs.

On 29 June, Croatia and Slovenia agreed to suspend their declarations of independence to allow time for a negotiated settlement. The EC delegation appeared to make progress when Serbia responded to the move by ceasing their opposition to the appointment of a Croatian member of the federal presidency, Stjepan Mesić, as President of the Presidency of Yugoslavia on 30 June. The appearance of a success was reinforced when the JNA ordered its troops posted in Slovenia to return to their barracks. On 1 July, de Michelis was replaced by João de Deus Pinheiro, the Portuguese foreign minister, to maintain the formula of current, former and future EC presidencies comprising the EC delegation as the Netherlands took over the presidency from Luxembourg, while Portugal was scheduled to assume the presidency after the Dutch.

== Conference at Brijuni ==
A further result of the EC delegation's mission were talks attended by representatives of the EC, Croatia, Slovenia, Serbia and the Yugoslav government. The talks were held at Brijuni Islands on 7 July. Besides the EC delegation, headed by van den Broek, five out of eight members of the federal presidency attended the talks—Mesić, Bogić Bogićević, Janez Drnovšek, Branko Kostić and Vasil Tupurkovski. The Yugoslav federal prime minister Ante Marković was also present, as were the Yugoslav federal foreign minister Budimir Lončar, interior minister Petar Gračanin and the deputy defence minister Vice Admiral Stane Brovet. Croatia was represented by President Franjo Tuđman while President Milan Kučan attended on behalf of Slovenia. Serbia was represented by Borisav Jović, a former Serbian member of the federal presidency who had resigned from the position on 15 June, instead of Milošević who refused to attend. Starting at 8:00 a.m., the EC delegation held separate talks with Kučan and his assistants, then with Tuđman and his assistants, and finally with Jović. In the afternoon, a plenary meeting was held with the federal, Slovene and Croatian delegations in attendance, while Jović reportedly left dissatisfied with the talks.

The agreement was prepared at the EC council of ministers in The Hague on 5 July. It consisted of a Joint Declaration, and two annexes detailing the creation of an environment suitable to further political negotiations and guidelines for an observer mission to Yugoslavia. The agreement, which became known as the Brioni Declaration or the Brioni Agreement, required the JNA and the TDS to return to their bases, and stipulated that Slovene officials were to control Slovenia's borders alone and that both Slovenia and Croatia were to suspend all activities stemming from their declarations of independence for three months. The observer mission set out by the Brioni Agreement materialised as the European Community Monitor Mission (ECMM) tasked with monitoring the disengagement of the JNA and the TDS in Slovenia, and ultimately the withdrawal of the JNA from Slovenia.

== Aftermath ==
Even though little was agreed upon and the agreement was later interpreted differently by its signatories, the Brioni Agreement established the EC's interest in the region and the first EC Ministerial Conference on Yugoslavia was held in The Hague on 10 July. The ECMM helped calm several standoffs around military barracks in Slovenia and facilitated negotiations between Slovene authorities and the JNA regarding the withdrawal of the JNA from Slovenia. In Croatia, armed combat continued and the JNA shelled the city of Osijek the same evening the agreement was signed. The federal presidency ordered the complete withdrawal of the JNA from Slovenia on 18 July in response to Slovene actions in breach of the Brioni Agreement. The ECMM's scope of work was expanded to include Croatia on 1 September. By mid-September, the war had escalated as the Croatian National Guard and police blockaded the JNA barracks and the JNA embarked on a campaign against Croatian forces.

The Brioni Agreement isolated Marković who tried to preserve the federation, but was ignored by van den Broek who appeared not to comprehend issues presented before him, and the EC delegation tacitly encouraged the dissolution of Yugoslavia. The agreement diminished the authority of part of the JNA's leadership who fought for the preservation of the Yugoslav federation. The agreement was also unfavourable for Croatia because it was left to defend against the JNA and Serb forces. By effectively removing Slovenia from influence of the federal authorities, especially the JNA, the agreement fulfilled one of the Serbian nationalists' goals, allowing the redrawing of international borders. Sabrina Ramet noted that Kučan and Milošević reached an agreement in January 1991 in which Milošević gave his assurances that Slovenia's independence bid would not be opposed by Serbia. In return, Kučan expressed his understanding for Milošević's interest to create a Greater Serbia.

At the time, the EC viewed the agreement as a method of defusing the crisis and failed to attribute the lull which coincided with the Brioni Agreement to a shift in Serbian strategy instead. The EC delegation's failure to respond to Jović's departure before the plenary meeting and the EC foreign ministers' declaration of 10 July indicating the EC would withdraw from mediation if the Brioni Agreement was not implemented only encouraged Serbia which, unlike Slovenia, Croatia, or the Yugoslav federation, had nothing to lose if the EC pulled out. In the end, the EC took credit for a rapid resolution of the armed conflict in Slovenia without realising that its diplomatic efforts had little to do with the situation on the ground.
