= Andrea Joana-Maria Wiktorin =

German diplomat

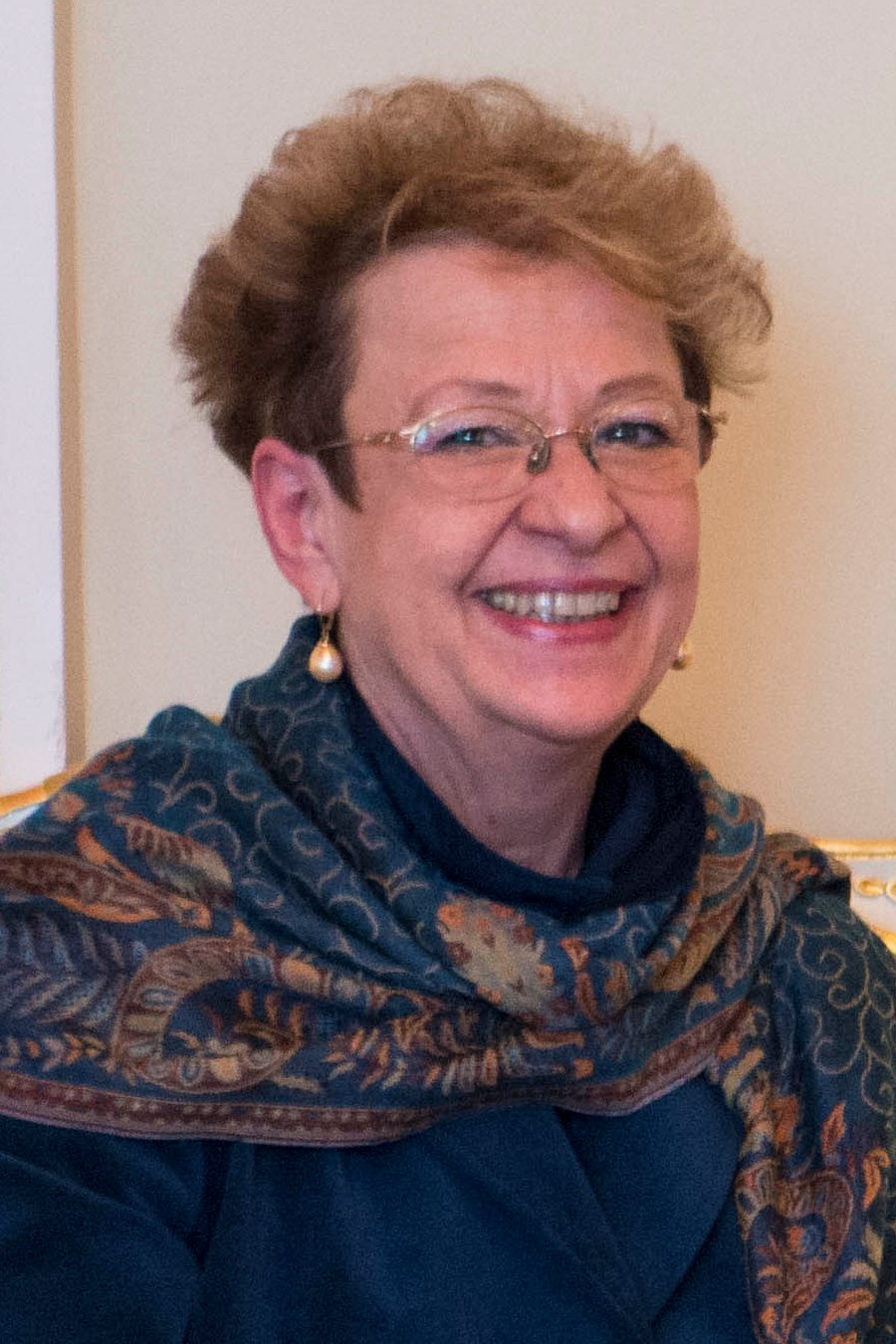
Andrea WIktorin in 2015

Andrea Joana-Maria Wiktorin (born 1957, Bonn) is a German diplomat who has served in a variety of posts. She became the head of the EU Delegation to Belarus after having served as Ambassador of Germany to Latvia since 2012 and before that, to Armenia between 2007 and 2009. Since September 2019, she once again served as the head of the Delegation of the European Union to Armenia based in Yerevan until September 2023.

== See also ==
- Armenia–European Union relations
