= European Union Monitoring Capacity to Armenia =

Unarmed peacekeeping mission of the European Union in Armenia

- Map of Europe with the European Union in green and Armenia in orange.
- Abbreviation: EUMCAP
- Successor: European Union Planning Assistance Team in Armenia
- Formation: 6 October 2022; 4 years ago
- Dissolved: 19 December 2022; 3 years ago
- Head of the EU Monitoring Capacity: Marek Szczygieł
- Parent organization: European Union
- Staff: 40
- Website: www.eeas.europa.eu

The European Union Monitoring Capacity to Armenia (EUMCAP) was a European Union civilian deployment in the territory of Armenia that was agreed on 6 October 2022 and officially became operational on 20 October 2022. The EUMCAP completed its mandate on 19 December 2022 at which point it was superseded by a European Union Planning Assistance Team in Armenia in preparation of a possible longer-term mission in the country.

== Mandate ==
The stated aim of the mission is to contribute to the border commissions work on boundary delimitation of the international border of Armenia and Azerbaijan, facilitate the restoration of peace and security in the area, and to build overall confidence between the two states.

== Timeline of events ==
Armenian Prime Minister Nikol Pashinyan, Azerbaijani President Ilham Aliyev, French President Emmanuel Macron, and European Council President Charles Michel met in Prague on 6 October 2022.

On 6 October 2022, Armenian Prime Minister Nikol Pashinyan and Azeri President Ilham Aliyev met at the 1st European Political Community summit in Prague in an attempt to resolve the long running Nagorno-Karabakh conflict and the recent Armenia–Azerbaijan border crisis. Following the meeting, it was stated that the two parties agreed to the deployment of a European Union CSDP led mission to be deployed on the Armenian side of their shared border for a period of two months, starting in October 2022.

On 13 October 2022, a technical group consisting of 17 specialists from the European Union arrived in Yerevan to discuss logistics of the EU mission in Armenia. Secretary of the Security Council of Armenia, Armen Grigoryan, described the European Union as an additional guarantor of security in the region and confirmed Armenia's readiness to support the mission in all matters.

On 17 October 2022, it was announced that 40 experts from the EU would be deployed to Armenia following a meeting held in Luxembourg. The EU also confirmed the experts will be deployed on the Armenian side of the border with Azerbaijan during the course of the observer mission. Most of the EU monitors will be transferred from Georgia, where a large number of EU monitors are currently stationed as part of the European Union Monitoring Mission in Georgia (EUMM Georgia).

While the timeframe for deployment has been set at an initial two months, EU officials believe a more permanent solution, like a dedicated "EUMM Armenia" will be needed in the long term. Toivo Klaar, the EU Special Representative for the South Caucasus and the crisis in Georgia stated, "The parties are now looking to us; the parties are increasingly feeling that we can better meet the situation that Russia can no longer" and "the fact is now they think that we can be first, an honest broker, and second we promise things for the future that Russia cannot promise – we promise to get closer to the European Union."

On 19 October 2022, EU monitors visited Armenian settlements along the border with Azerbaijan. The monitors were accompanied by local government representatives and members from the Armed Forces of Armenia. The EU delegation toured settlements which had been targeted by Azeri shelling in September 2022. The governor of the Gegharkunik Province, Karen Sargsyan stated "Azerbaijan violated the borders of Armenia in several directions in both 2021 and 2022 and entered our territory several kilometers deep in several directions. The presence of the Azerbaijani armed forces terrorizes the residents of the bordering settlements, disrupts their normal life and activities".

On 20 October 2022, Prime Minister of Armenia Nikol Pashinyan stated "I have to record with pleasure that the partners of the European Union have responded very promptly and made a decision." The Prime Minister also stated, "the initial observation mission shall work for two months, but there are opinions among experts that it is necessary to extend this period, or to try to make this observation mission permanent," during a meeting with government ministers.

The European External Action Service announced that the first patrol of the mission was conducted on 27 October 2022.

On 31 October 2022, a European Parliament delegation arrived in Armenia. The delegation met with members of the National Assembly, representatives from the Armenian Apostolic Church, and with representatives from Artsakh.

On 3 November 2022, a third meeting between the Armenian and Azerbaijani border commissions took place in Brussels. The Secretary General of the European External Action Service Stefano Sannino, stated "The European Union urges the sides to take steps to improve security on the ground and to achieve progress on delimitation". There was also speculation that Armenia and Azerbaijan could sign a Western-backed peace treaty by December 2022 in Tbilisi, Georgia.

On 4 November 2022, Foreign Minister of Armenia Ararat Mirzoyan received the Head of the EU Monitoring Capacity Marek Szczygieł and EU ambassador to Armenia Andrea Wiktorin. Marek Szczygieł expressed gratitude to the Armenian side for the support provided to the EU civilian mission.

=== OSCE assessment mission to Armenia ===
On 19 October 2022, the OSCE confirmed it would deploy a "needs assessment team" to Armenia between 21 and 27 October 2022. On 20 October 2022, the EU confirmed that the OSCE mission is independent and non–related to the EU's mission, however, the EU's mission would liaise with all relevant international organizations, including the OSCE.

=== Possible extension ===
On 6 December 2022, French Minister for Europe and Foreign Affairs, Catherine Colonna said the EU observation mission's mandate in Armenia needs to be extended. Colonna stated, "Tension between the two countries has not eased, both on the Armenian-Azerbaijani border and in Nagorno-Karabakh. And it shows the lack of trust and security guarantees that Russia claimed to provide in this region. That is a fact. In this context, France and the EU are eager to help Armenia." The minister also stated, "The mission should remain as long as necessary. This is our belief and the desire of Armenians."

Also on 6 December 2022, head of the Program for International Order and Democracy at the German Council on Foreign Relations Stefan Meister stated, "The EU needs to be more engaged to help Armenia preserve its sovereignty and stay on its path of democratization and reform. The mission should be extended until a border agreement has been reached" and "the EU should become more active player in finding a peace agreement on Karabakh and border delimitation agreement between Armenia and Azerbaijan. That means, the EU should further internationalize the conflict pushing for a EU Monitoring Mission between both states until a border agreement has been decided. It should offer to send peacekeepers into Nagorno-Karabakh to replace Russia. Russia cannot give an international legitimization to any agreement, the EU can."

=== EU Planning Assistance Team ===
On 19 December 2022, the European Union Monitoring Capacity to Armenia completed its mission. High Representative of the Union for Foreign Affairs and Security Policy, Josep Borrell stated, "The deployment of 40 European monitoring experts has proved to be effective and contributed to building confidence in an unstable situation. Today we start a new phase in the EU's engagement in the South Caucasus, with a transitional team that will prepare the ground for a possible longer term EU mission in Armenia, with the ultimate goal of contributing to sustainable peace in the region."

The European Council and Armenian authorities decided that the European Union Monitoring Mission in Georgia (EUMM Georgia) would deploy a European Union Planning Assistance Team in Armenia to enhance the EU's awareness of the security situation, assist in planning a possible civilian CSDP mission in the country, and to support the EU-facilitated normalization process between Armenia and Azerbaijan.

== Reactions ==
=== Positive ===
- Armenia: Deputy Foreign Minister Paruyr Hovhannisyan stated, "The Armenian side is open to all proposals that will strengthen our security in order to avoid border clashes." The Minister also said, "We see efforts from the West to support both sides to come to a common reconciliation."
- Bulgaria: Bulgarian president Rumen Radev emphasized that Bulgaria supports the fact-finding observation mission of the EU.
- Canada: On 2 December 2022, Minister of Foreign Affairs, Mélanie Joly highlighted the role of the EU observation mission in Armenia towards maintaining stability in the region, and expressed support for the mission.
- European Union: European Council President Charles Michel said, "A principle agreement has been reached regarding the EU civilian mission. It will help build trust and support the work of the border commissions." The High Representative of the Union for Foreign Affairs and Security Policy Josep Borrell reaffirmed the EU's commitment to peace and stability in the South Caucasus. Meanwhile, the European Union Special Representative in the South Caucasus, Tovio Klaar, called on the European Parliament and all EU member states to support peace efforts in all possible ways.
- France: President of France Emmanuel Macron said, "Armenia and Azerbaijan confirmed their commitment to the Charter of the United Nations and the Alma-Ata 1991 Declaration through which both recognize each other's territorial integrity and sovereignty."
- Germany: On 19 October 2022, the German Foreign Ministry stated that Germany would like to participate in the EU observation mission to Armenia and that Germany is prepared to send experts to Armenia in November 2022.
- Lithuania: The Ministry of Foreign Affairs stated, "The idea to establish an EU monitoring mission at the Armenia-Azerbaijan border comes to life. It was first voiced by the EU-mandated trio of the Austrian, Lithuanian, and Romanian Foreign Ministers during their visit to the South Caucasus last June. If durable, it will become a significant step towards lasting peace in the region."
- NATO: NATO Deputy Assistant Secretary General for Political Affairs & Security Policy, Javier Colomina, stated "Good news to see our partners discussing border delimitation. NATO supports the normalization of relations between Armenia and Azerbaijan, and welcomes EU efforts towards that end, including hosting talks and launching of the European Union Monitoring Capacity".
- Norway: Foreign Minister Anniken Huitfeldt reiterated Norway's support for Armenia's territorial integrity and sovereignty, while expressing hope for the EU's mission.
- United States: The United States Department of State announced, "The United States is particularly pleased with the progress on an EU observer mission that will be dispatched to the Armenian-Azerbaijani border and this mission has the potential to build confidence between both sides." US Secretary of State Antony Blinken also welcomed the progress in official peace talks between the two countries and expressed the willingness of the US to contribute to the negotiation process.

=== Negative ===
- Azerbaijan: President of Azerbaijan Ilham Aliyev stated, "Azerbaijan vehemently rejected an attempt to deploy a civilian mission of the European Union to the Armenian border from the Azerbaijani side" during a meeting held with Vladimir Putin on 14 October 2022.
- Belarus: President of Belarus Alexander Lukashenko stated, "Russia is already a mediator in the settlement of the situation between Armenia and Azerbaijan, and that is quite enough".
- Iran: Iranian president Ebrahim Raisi rejected "any European military presence under any guise" in the region.
- Russia: Russian Foreign Ministry spokesperson Maria Zakharova said, "We see this as yet another attempt by the EU to interfere by any means in the normalization of relations between Armenia and Azerbaijan, to oust our country's mediation efforts." Meanwhile, during a CIS meeting in Astana on 12 October 2022, Russian Foreign Minister Sergey Lavrov stated that the CSTO was also ready to send observers to Armenia.
- Turkey: Foreign Minister Mevlüt Çavuşoğlu criticized the EU and stated, "The EU does not fulfill the terms of its agreements".

== See also ==
- Armenia–EU Comprehensive and Enhanced Partnership Agreement
- Armenia–European Union relations
- EU Strategy for the South Caucasus
- Foreign relations of Armenia
- Foreign relations of the European Union
