= Armenia–Azerbaijan border crisis (2021–present) =

Political and military crisis on the Armenia–Azerbaijan border

- Part of the Nagorno-Karabakh conflict
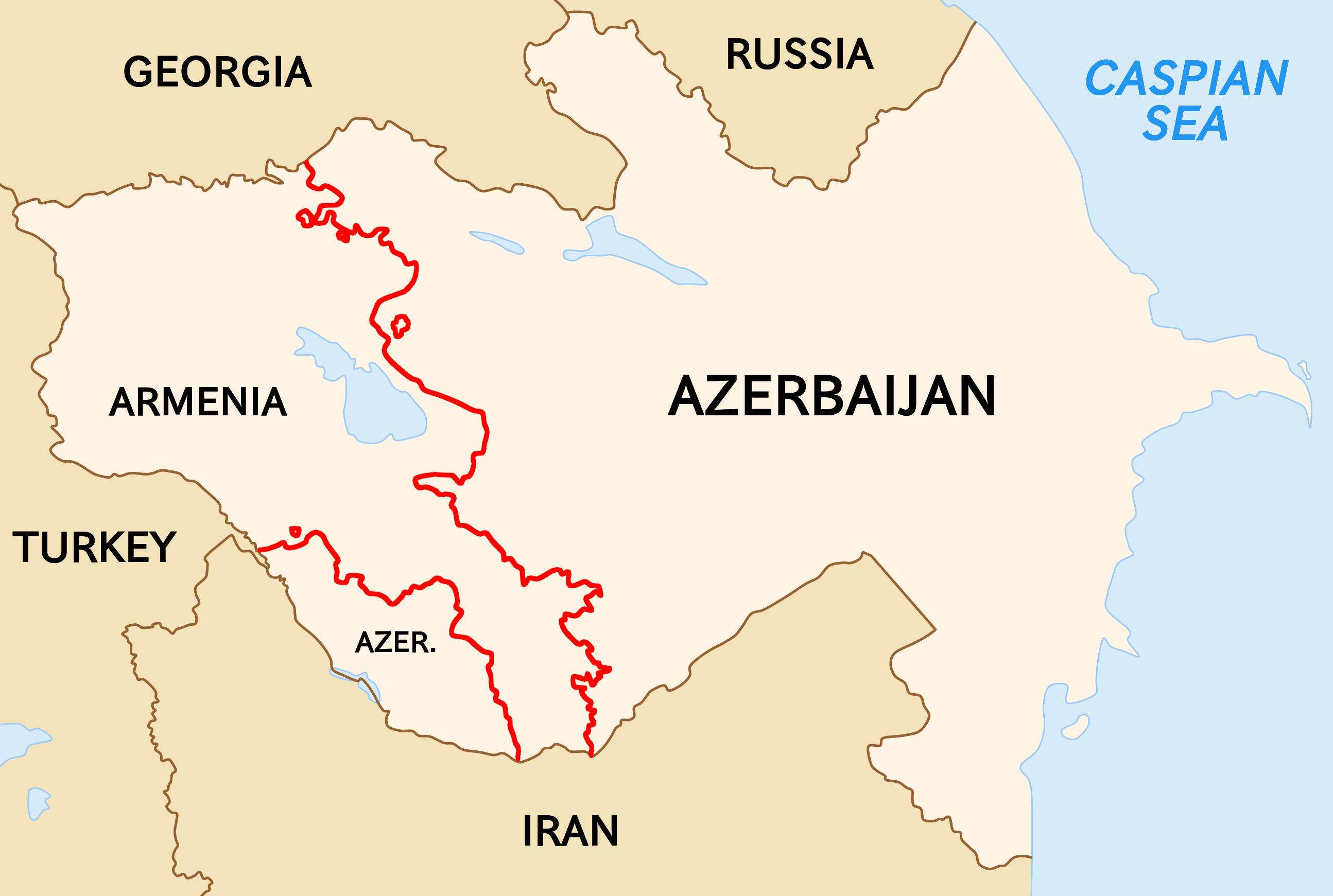
- Armenia–Azerbaijan border
Date	12 May 2021 – present (5 years, 3 months, 1 week and 2 days)
Location	Armenia–Azerbaijan border: Syunik–Lachin border; Vayots Dzor–Kalbajar border; Gegharkunik–Kalbajar border; Gegharkunik–Dashkasan border; Tavush–Tovuz border; Armenia–Nakhchivan border
Status	Ongoing
Territorial changes	Azerbaijan occupies parts of the Syunik and Gegharkunik provinces adjacent to the Armenia–Azerbaijan border: 215 square kilometers (83 square miles) of Armenian territory

Belligerents
Azerbaijan; Azerbaijan Armed Forces; State Border Service of Azerbaijan	Armenia; Armenia Armed Forces; Armenian Border Guard

Commanders and leaders
Ilham Aliyev; Ali Asadov; Zakir Hasanov; Karim Valiyev; Karam Mustafayev	Nikol Pashinyan; Armen Sarkissian (until 1 February); Vahagn Khachaturyan (from 13 March); Vagharshak Harutiunyan (until 20 July); Artak Davtyan; Suren Papikyan (from 16 November)

Casualties and losses
Per Azerbaijan: At least 283 servicemen killed; 296 servicemen injured; 2 servicemen captured (later released)	Per Armenia: At least 436 servicemen killed; 328 servicemen injured; 38 servicemen captured (20 later released)
- 22+ non-combatants killed (International Crisis Group)

The military forces of Armenia and Azerbaijan have been engaged in a border conflict since 12 May 2021, when Azerbaijani soldiers crossed several kilometers into Armenia in the provinces of Syunik and Gegharkunik. Despite international calls for withdrawal from the European Parliament, France, Iran, and the United States, Azerbaijan has maintained its presence on Armenian soil, occupying at least 215 square kilometers (83 sq mi) of internationally recognized Armenian territory. This occupation follows a pattern of Azerbaijan provoking cross-border fights and instigating ceasefire violations when its government is unhappy with the pace of negotiations with Armenia.

There have been repeated escalations, with significant incursions occurring along the Armenia–Nakhchivan border in July 2021 and in the Gegharkunik–Kalbajar area in November 2021. In a further provocation, Azerbaijani forces blockaded southern Armenia in August 2021 by closing the main north–south highway, effectively isolating Armenia from Iran and forcing the creation of alternative transportation routes. The most severe confrontation took place in September 2022, marking the largest attack by Azerbaijan on Armenia in the history of their conflict, resulting in casualties on both sides.

Despite Armenia's appeals for assistance from the Collective Security Treaty Organisation (CSTO) and Russia during Azerbaijan's incursions in May 2021 and September 2022, both entities declined to assist, leaving Armenia on its own. Officials from the European Parliament, the United States, and Russia have condemned Azerbaijan's military operations as violations of the ceasefire agreement. Azerbaijan's incursions have been combined with threats and territorial claims referring to Armenia as "Western Azerbaijan" made by the president of Azerbaijan: "Armenia must accept our conditions" if Armenians wish to "live comfortably on an area of 29,000 square kilometers" (11,000 sq. mi.).

In response to the ongoing aggression, Armenia allocated additional defense areas to border guards of the Russian Federal Security Service. Additionally, the EU dispatched a CSDP civilian monitoring mission to Armenia to promote border stability and deter future Azerbaijani offensives, despite criticism from Azerbaijani and Russian officials. The enduring conflict has heavily militarized the Armenian-Azerbaijani border, drastically affecting the lives of local Armenian residents. Communities have faced direct targeting, with restricted access to essential resources, farmlands, and social infrastructures, leading to a significant displacement of civilians.

Map showing the territories of Armenia occupied by Azerbaijan (2023)

In April 2024, Armenia and Azerbaijan reached an agreement according to which the border between the two states is to be demarcated on the basis of the Alma-Ata declaration.

== Background ==
Armenia and Azerbaijan have not officially demarcated their mutual borders since becoming independent states following collapse of the Soviet Union in 1991. There were also major clashes in 2012, 2014, 2018 and 2020.

The issue of border demarcation between Armenia and Azerbaijan arose immediately after the defeat of Armenia in the Second Nagorno-Karabakh War, and Azerbaijan regaining control over its occupied territories. Before the 2020 war, there was no mutually agreed upon border between Armenia and Azerbaijan, with certain Armenian villages and agricultural workers crossing over into Azerbaijan. During Soviet times, cross-border interactions and movements were common.

The issue of exclaves/enclaves is another border-related issue; there is an exclave called Artsvashen which is formally part of Soviet-era Armenia but controlled by and situated entirely within the current Republic of Azerbaijan; likewise, there are 4 Azerbaijani exclave villages of Karki, Yukhari Askipara, Barxudarlı and Sofulu that were formally part of Soviet-era Azerbaijan but are controlled by and situated entirely within the current Republic of Armenia.

Following the Second Nagorno-Karabakh War, physical demarcation of the borders commenced in certain areas using excavators. Azerbaijan used Armenia's main north–south highway and Google Maps to unofficially demarcate the border between the southern regions of the two countries; Armenian residents who lived on the east side of the highway were given three days to leave. Azerbaijan built many new border posts often using Armenian roads under the escort of Russian military. Intimidated by the presence of Azerbaijani military, certain Armenians living in border regions limited the number of trips to the region using the main highway; others moved away permanently. Armenia and Azerbaijan agree that Soviet-era borders should form the basis of border delineation based on the Alma-Ata 1991 Declaration, although Azerbaijan has rejected the use of late Soviet maps.

Since the end of the war, Azerbaijan has increasingly promoted expansionist claims to Armenian territory which it describes as "Western Azerbaijan" which have been perceived as a bargaining strategy to force Armenians to relinquish control of Artsakh and concede the "Zangezur corridor." The Azerbaijani government has also successfully petitioned Google to remove historical Armenian place names from maps of Artsakh.

In April 2021, Azerbaijan's president Ilham Aliyev made irredentist claims over Armenia's capital Yerevan, Zangezur (Syunik), and Sevan (Gegharkunik), declaring that they are "historical lands" of Azerbaijan. He said that if Armenia would not agree to provide a corridor from Nakhchivan to western Azerbaijan through Armenia's Syunik Province, then Azerbaijan would establish it through the use of force, claiming that Azerbaijani people would return to what he described as "West Zangazur". Turkey supports Azerbaijan and also seeks territorial control over Armenia's Syunik province.

A joint statement by the European Parliament Chair of the Delegation for relations with the South Caucasus, Marina Kaljurand, and Standing Rapporteurs on Armenia and Azerbaijan, Andrey Kovatchev and Željana Zovko condemned the statements made by the Azerbaijani side: "To de-escalate the situation...we condemn in particular recent statements by Azerbaijani representatives regarding so-called 'West Zangezur' and referring to the territory of the Republic of Armenia as Azerbaijani 'ancestral land'. Such statements are highly irresponsible and threaten to undermine regional security further."

The day of Azerbaijan's first military incursion on 12 May 2021, it announced it was holding a four-day exercise involving 15,000 soldiers, involving tanks, missile systems, and aviation units, among other military resources.

== Armenian territory occupied by Azerbaijan ==
Azerbaijani soldiers are occupying internationally recognized Armenian territory and conducting engineering and fortification works. Estimates of the amount of territory occupied vary between 50 and 215 square kilometers (20 and 83 sq. mi.) with some local Armenian officials and farmers claiming that the Azerbaijani military has made bigger territorial gains than is admitted by officials in Yerevan.

European PACE monitors have "…observed the presence of Azerbaijani military positions within Armenian sovereign territory sometimes well beyond any disputed border line… [including]… strategic high ground… overlooking the main road linking the capital Yerevan to the Iranian border. These strategic heights are in the regions of Gegharkunik, Kapan, and near the village of Nerkin Khand further south. According to International Crisis Group, these new positions clearly give Azerbaijan an advantage if fighting resumes since they encircle several Armenian villages and overlook the main road to Syunik which is considered "a lifeline for the country's communication's routes" to both Iran and Nagorno-Karabakh.

Locals fear Azerbaijan will threaten to cut off southern Armenia from the rest of the country unless Armenia surrenders concessions such as the Zangezur corridor. Southern Armenia (Syunik) is often referred to as "the backbone of Armenia" given that it connects Armenia both to Artsakh as well as to Iran. With 80% of Armenia's borders being closed since Turkey and Azerbaijan's 30 year-long blockade, the border with Iran comprises one of only two open international borders to Armenia.

Since Azerbaijan's military incursions, Armenia's eastern border has become militarized; it has been common for Armenian farmers in border areas to be shot at and for their livestock to be robbed. Azerbaijani forces kidnap, torture, rape, execute, and "forcibly disappear" Armenian civilians in border regions. Fearing for their safety, many Armenian villagers have stopped using land previously used for agricultural purposes and others have moved away permanently.

Azerbaijan has not withdrawn its troops from internationally recognised Armenian territory despite calls to do so by the European Parliament, United States and France – the latter two which comprise two of three co-chairs of the OSCE Minsk Group.

Azerbaijani media outlets and notable politicians within the country have called for the occupation of more Armenian land.

== Timeline ==
=== May 2021 ===
On 12 May, hundreds of Azerbaijani soldiers crossed several kilometres (miles) into Armenian territory and occupied territory within the provinces of Gegharkunik and Syunik. The same day, Azerbaijan announced it was holding a four-day exercise involving 15,000 soldiers, tanks, missile systems, and aviation units.

In Syunik, Azerbaijani soldiers attempted to surround Lake Sev. The soldiers advanced towards civilian settlements, scaring local agricultural workers. Incursions by Azerbaijani soldiers were also observed in Verishen and Sisian within Syunik.

In Gegharkunik, Azerbaijani incursions were also observed, including in Vardenis, with certain media outlets reporting that Azerbaijani forces had captured areas there. The Armenian National Security Service warned of the legal consequences of reporting misinformation that "cause[s] panic."

Prime Minister of Armenia Nikol Pashinyan said negotiations were ongoing for an Azerbaijani withdrawal, and that Armenian forces had stopped the advance without any skirmishes having taken place.

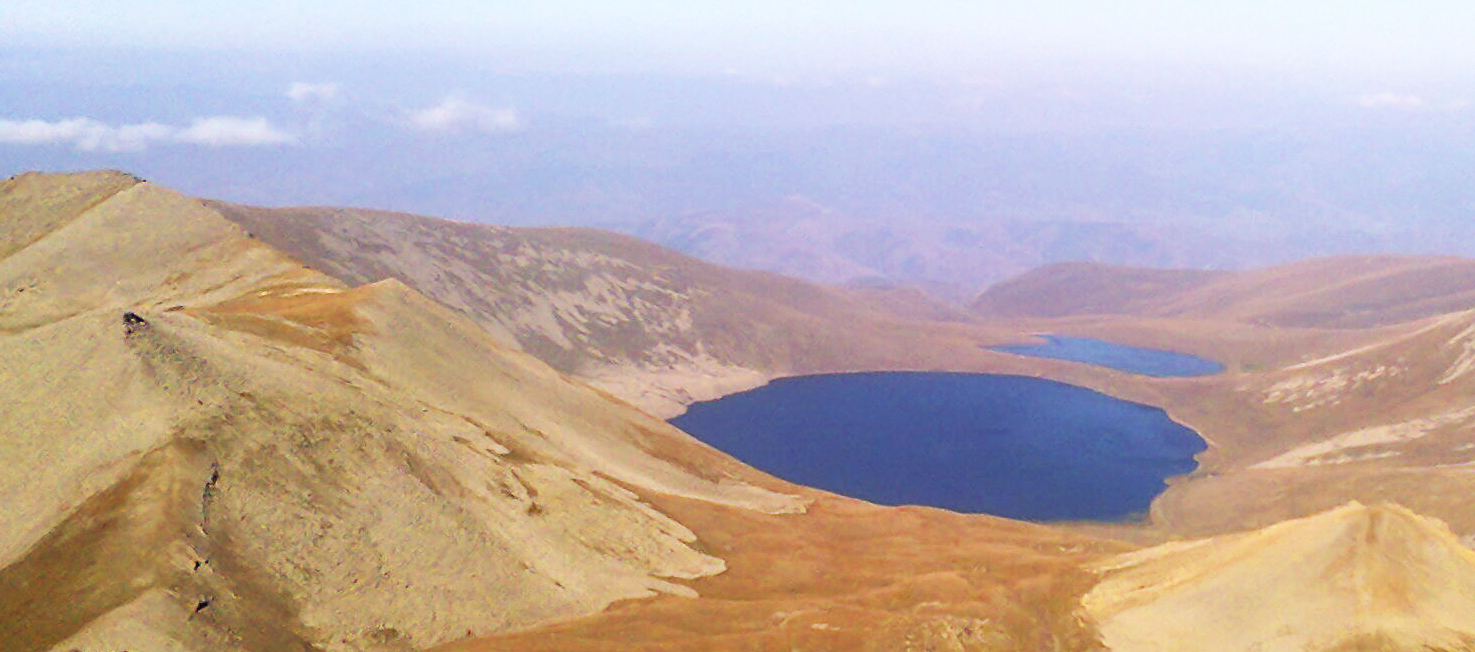
Lake Sev as seen from the peak of Mets Ishkhanasar mountain in Armenia

Azerbaijan claims that its forces did not cross into Armenia and merely took up positions that were inaccessible in winter months, adding that the border between the two countries was never formally demarcated following the collapse of the Soviet Union.

However, Soviet maps from 1975 show that over 90% of Sev Lake is in Armenian territory, with only a small section of the northern shore situated within Azerbaijan SSR The map also shows the adjacent smaller Lake Janlich (Jinli) as entirely in Armenian territory. The Azerbaijani side, showed a map with the entire Sev lake belonging to Azerbaijan, and refused to leave the territory.

On 13 May, the Armenian Defense Ministry reported that Azerbaijani forces crossed the Armenian border in two other sections. The same day, Nikol Pashinyan said that 250 Azerbaijani soldiers remained within Armenia's internationally recognized borders.

On 14 May, the Prime Minister of Armenia, Nikol Pashinyan, formally appealed to the Russian-led Collective Security Treaty Organization (CSTO) to hold consultations regarding the Azerbaijani incursion into Armenia. Armenian and Azerbaijani military officials convened at the border together with representatives of the Russian military deployed in the Syunik Province for several hours of negotiations, without any immediate resulting agreement being announced afterwards. Pashinyan also said in a speech on 14 May that French President Emmanuel Macron said that France was ready to provide military assistance if necessary.

On 15 May, Armenia's Defense Ministry stated that the situation regarding the Azerbaijani incursion on 12–13 May remained unresolved, with some Azerbaijani soldiers still on Armenian territory, and that negotiations in order to bring about a peaceful settlement were ongoing.

On 15 May, the press service of the Ministry of Foreign Affairs of Azerbaijan responded by saying that it was enforcing the borders of Azerbaijan on the basis of "maps available to both sides", criticizing the Armenian statements as "provocative" and "inadequate". The Ministry also accused the Armenian authorities of using the situation for pre-election domestic political purposes, a claim which is considered unlikely.

During a call with Kazakh President Kassym-Jomart Tokayev, Azerbaijani President Aliyev described Armenia's decision to appeal to the CSTO as an attempt to "internationalize the issue".

On 19 May, Russian Foreign Minister Sergey Lavrov said that Russia came up with an initiative to create a joint Armenia-Azerbaijan commission on demarcation and delimitation of the borders, in which Russia could play the role of a consultant or mediator. On 20 May, acting prime minister Nikol Pashinyan confirmed that Armenia and Azerbaijan were close to an agreement on the creation of a joint commission to demarcate the border between the two countries, with Russia acting as a mediator, and each country appointing delegates to the commission by 31 May.

In the morning of 20 May, a group of Azerbaijani servicemen crossed the border near the village of Khoznavar in the Goris region, walking 1.5 km (1 mile) into Armenian territory. They were forced back to their original positions by Armenian forces, but they then made a second attempt to cross the border in the evening, resulting in a fight between Armenian and Azerbaijani servicemen. The General Prosecutor's Office of Armenia reported that eleven Armenian soldiers were injured and hospitalized, and that there were injuries from the Azerbaijani side, too. The videos of the incident were leaked on social media, initially a video of Azerbaijani military men attacking and beating Armenian soldiers, and, on the next day, another video showing the Armenian Armed Forces expelling Azerbaijani servicemen from their territory appeared.

On 25 May, an Armenian soldier was killed 7 kilometers (5 miles) within Armenian territory which Azerbaijan denied. The same day, all male staff working for the administration of the Sisian community were mobilized into volunteer defense units.

On 27 May, after the tensions rose further after the capture of six Armenian soldiers by Azerbaijani forces early in the morning, Armenian Prime Minister Nikol Pashinyan called for the deployment of international observers along portions of Armenia's border with Azerbaijan. "If the situation is not resolved this provocation could inevitably lead to a large-scale clash," Pashinyan said at an emergency meeting of Armenia's Security Council held in the evening, suggesting Armenia and Azerbaijan to pull back their troops from the border areas and let Russia and/or the United States and France, the two other co-chairs of the OSCE Minsk Group, deploy their observers there. The disengagement of troops and the launch of the monitoring mission, should be followed by a process of "ascertaining border points" supervised by the international community, the Prime Minister said.

On 28 May, the EU spokesperson Peter Stano called for immediate de-escalation and urged both sides to pull back their forces to positions held before 12 May and engage in negotiations on border delimitation and demarcation, welcoming proposals for a possible international observation mission and expressing readiness to provide expertise and help on border delimitation and demarcation. The EU continues to call on Azerbaijan to release all prisoners of war and detainees without delay and welcomes all efforts aimed at decreasing tensions.

=== July 2021 ===
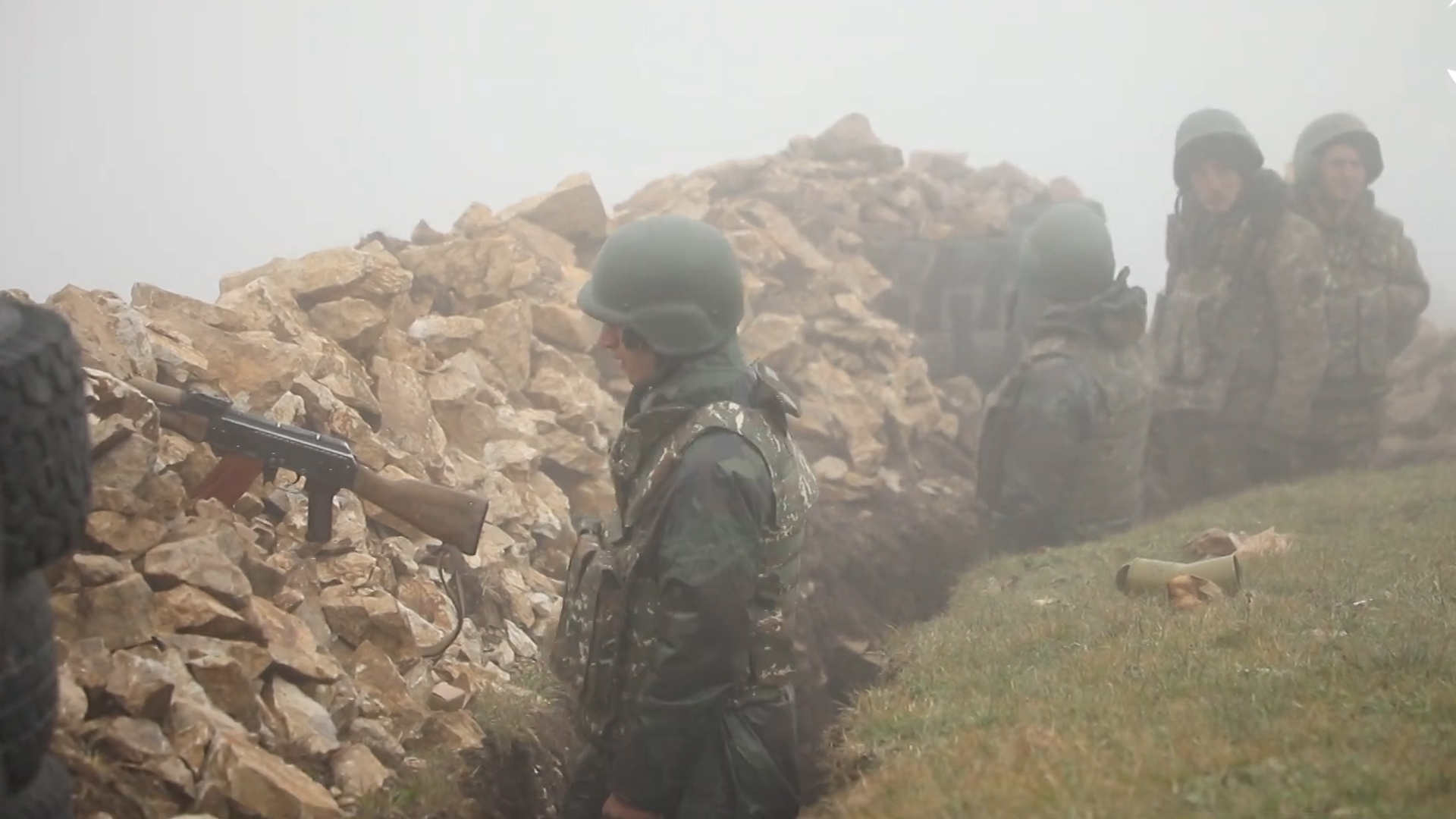
Military positions of the Armenian forces in the northeastern direction of Armenia, which were attacked by Azerbaijani forces on 28 July 2021, according to the Armenian MoD

After an incident on 6 July in the Agdam District, Armenian and Azerbaijani forces clashed again in the directions of Azerbaijan's Tovuz, Gadabay, Nakhchivan and Shusha districts from 7 to 20 July. On 14 July, the Armenian defence ministry stated that the Azerbaijani engineers tried to advance their military positions near Yeraskh in the Nakhchivan section of the Armenia–Azerbaijan border, and clashes erupted. The ministry added that the Azerbaijani side had started shelling Yeraskh, using mortars and grenade launchers, with an Armenian soldier getting killed and the community leader of Yeraskh getting wounded. The Azerbaijani Defense Ministry stated that an Azerbaijani soldier stationed near Heydarabad was wounded during the clashes, and added that the "responsibility for the creation of tension along the state border of the two countries lies entirely with Armenia." The Azerbaijani Defense Ministry later on the same day stated that the Armenian forces had fired at the Azerbaijani positions near Istisu in Kalbajar and Aghdam in Tovuz. On 19 July, further clashes erupted near Yeraskh on Armenia's eastern border with Azerbaijan's Nakhchivan.

On 22 July 2021, President of Azerbaijan Ilham Aliyev made another irredentist claim over Armenia's province of Syunik (also known as Zangezur), saying that it is "our own territory":

While in Yerevan, Charles Michel called the territories bordering with Armenia disputed. To be honest, I disagree with this statement. Because we believe that these are our territories. I believe that this is the territory of Zangezur. And Zangezur is the land of our ancestors, and we are on our territory.

— Ilham Aliev

On 23 July 2021, the Azerbaijani Ministry of Defence stated that one of its soldiers was killed by Armenian sniper fire in Kalbajar District near the Armenia–Azerbaijan border. Meanwhile, the Armenian MoD stated that three Armenian servicemen were wounded as Azerbaijani forces opened fire on Armenian positions located in the Gegharkunik section.

On 28 July 2021, the Human Rights Defender of Armenia reported about intensive firing from the Azerbaijani side between 03:30 and 03:40 targeting civilian buildings in the villages of Verin Shorzha and Saradeghy in the Gegharkunik Province. On the same day, three Armenian soldiers were killed in renewed clashes with Azerbaijani forces in the Kalbajar District and Gegharkunik Province, with four others wounded. Armenia accused Azerbaijan of "occupying Armenia's sovereign territory" as the Azerbaijani side blamed the incident on Armenian forces, stating that they opened fire first. Azerbaijan also reported 2 soldiers wounded during the skirmish.

On 29 July, the Azerbaijani Ministry of Defence stated that Armenian forces broke the ceasefire in the morning, using automatic rifles and grenade launchers. Armenian authorities then stated that the Azerbaijani side had violated the ceasefire, but Azerbaijan denied that it broke the ceasefire. An Armenian soldier was wounded in the shootout.

On 31 July, Armenian authorities stated that Azerbaijani forces fired upon a logistic support vehicle delivering food to Armenian military positions in Yeraskh. As a result, the vehicle was "seriously damaged".

=== August 2021 ===
On 13 August 2021, Armenia and Azerbaijan reported about shelling on the border. The Armenian MoD stated that the Azerbaijani units opened fire from various calibre firearms at the Armenian positions in the Gegarkunik section, meanwhile Azerbaijan said that the Armenian forces had opened fire in the direction of the Kalbajar and Gadabay Districts.

On 16 August 2021, two further Armenian soldiers were killed by Azerbaijani forces. Vahan Tatosyan died from sniper fire at 09:50hrs in Yeraskh, while Arman Hakobyan was killed in Gegharkunik at 18:10hrs.

On 17 August 2021, Armenian Ministry of Defence reported that another Armenian soldier was wounded as a result of a shelling attack from Azerbaijan.

On 25 August, Azerbaijani forces blockaded southern Armenia (Syunik) by closing the main north–south (Goris – Kapan) highway in Armenia in two sections near the villages of Karmrakar and Shurnukh, interrupting all international transit with Iran. The following day Azerbaijani forces blocked another section of the road further north, near the village of Vorotan. The blockade stranded hundreds of Iranian trucks and resulted in the isolation of three villages located in between the closed sections of the road. The blockade was alleviated partly under the escorts of Russian border guards which patrol the Armenian side of the border.

Armenian Prime Minister Pashinyan announced that the issue would be solved with the construction of a new north–south transport corridor, which was completed in November 2021.

On 27 August 2021, the Armenian Human Rights Defender reported that Azerbaijani troops had targeted Kut village: "Elderly people and children were in the yard at the time of the shooting. There were also children in the house at that time. On August 27, at around 10 pm, Azerbaijani armed forces fired intensively at civilian houses in the village of Kut, Gegharkunik region, directly targeting the civilian population," reported Arman Tatoyan.

=== September 2021 ===
On 1 September 2021, the Armenian soldier Gegham Sahakyan was killed by Azerbaijani sniper fire in Yeraskh. Following increased tension with Iran, Azerbaijan began charging taxes on Iranian truck drivers who deliver supplies to Armenia through the main north-south highway, which Azerbaijan had previously blockaded.

=== October 2021 ===
On 9 October 2021, the Armenian MoD reported that an Armenian serviceman, Misak Khachatryan, was injured by a shot from border with Azerbaijan in Ararat Province.

On 15 October 2021, Azerbaijani MoD reported that an Azerbaijani soldier was killed by Armenian sniper fire.

On 15 and 16 October 2021, Armenian media reported that Azerbaijani forces shelled the village of Yeraskh, causing fires which damaged crops.

=== November 2021 ===
Between 12 and 15 November 2021, Azerbaijan extended its blockade of southern Armenia by installing additional border checkpoints on the roads between and leading to the cities of Goris and Kapan.

On 16 November 2021, clashes between Azerbaijan and Armenia took place at the Syunik–Gegharkunik/Kalbajar–Lachin regions. At least seven Azerbaijani and 15 Armenian soldiers were killed, with 32 Armenian soldiers captured.

It appeared that Azerbaijan was using force to coerce Armenia into signing an agreement with various objectives: to demarcate their shared border, to establish an extraterritorial corridor through Armenia to Nakhchivan, and for Armenia to reaffirm that Artsakh is part of Azerbaijan. Haqqin, a pro-government Azerbaijani news agency, wrote "Azerbaijan has demonstrated that it is prepared to inflict the final blow against Armenia. For good. After this, Yerevan will have no alternative to return to the negotiating table." Although Azerbaijan claimed that Armenia provoked the fighting, geolocation footage indicated the Azerbaijani forces had made incursions clearly inside Armenia proper.

The clashes ended at 18:30 local time after a Russian-mediated ceasefire. On November 16, Pashinyan said that Azerbaijani forces occupied about 41 square kilometres (16 sq mi) of Armenia. The figure of 41 square kilometers (15 sq. mi.) has been used since May, which would suggest that no new land was occupied in this newest round of fighting, but this contradicted with the Armenian MOD report, according to which Armenia has lost two military positions on 16 November.

On November 17, a joint statement was issued by various EU officials: Marina Kaljurand (the European Union's chair of the delegation for relations with the South Caucasus), Andrey Kovatchev (the European Parliament's standing rapporteur on Armenia), and Željana Zovko (the European Parliament's standing rapporteur on Azerbaijan). These EU officials called the military operation launched by Azerbaijan on 16 November 2021 "the worst violation to date of the 2020 Nagorno-Karabakh ceasefire agreement" and "condemn[ed] any attempts at "borderisation", as observed since the incursion of Azerbaijani troops into Armenian territory.

On 22 November 2021, an Armenian soldier was killed by Azerbaijani forces near the village of Norabak in Gegharkunik province.

=== December 2021 ===
On December 3, a 65-year-old civilian, Seyran Sargsyan, from the Chartar village of Martuni district was captured and killed by the Azerbaijani military. The Russian peacekeepers have started and investigation on the case involving both sides.

On 4 December, Azerbaijan freed 10 captured Armenian soldiers captured from the 16 November clashes in exchange of maps detailing the location of landmines in Nagorno Karabakh, the agreement was achieved with Russian mediation.

On 9 December, the Azerbaijani Ministry of Defence announced that an Azerbaijani soldier was killed in a skirmish with Armenian forces on the Azeri-Armenian border.

On 10 December, the Armenian Ministry of Defence announced that an Armenian soldier was killed after clashes with Azerbaijani forces on the Gegharkunik area of the Armenian-Azerbaijani border.

On 18 December, two Azerbaijani servicemen were captured by Armenian forces near Lachin, the soldiers were later released.

=== January 2022 ===
On 11 January, one Azerbaijani soldier and three Armenian soldiers were killed in a shootout in the Verin Shorzha area of Armenia's Gegharkunik province.

=== April 2022 ===
On 6 April, Prime Minister Nikol Pashinyan and President İlham Aliyev met in Brussels for peace talks mediated by the European Council President Charles Michel.

On 6 April, the government of Azerbaijan said that Armenian forces shelled Azerbaijani military positions deployed in the Republic of Armenia's north-eastern borderline. However, Armenia's Defense Ministry refuted this.

=== September 2022 ===
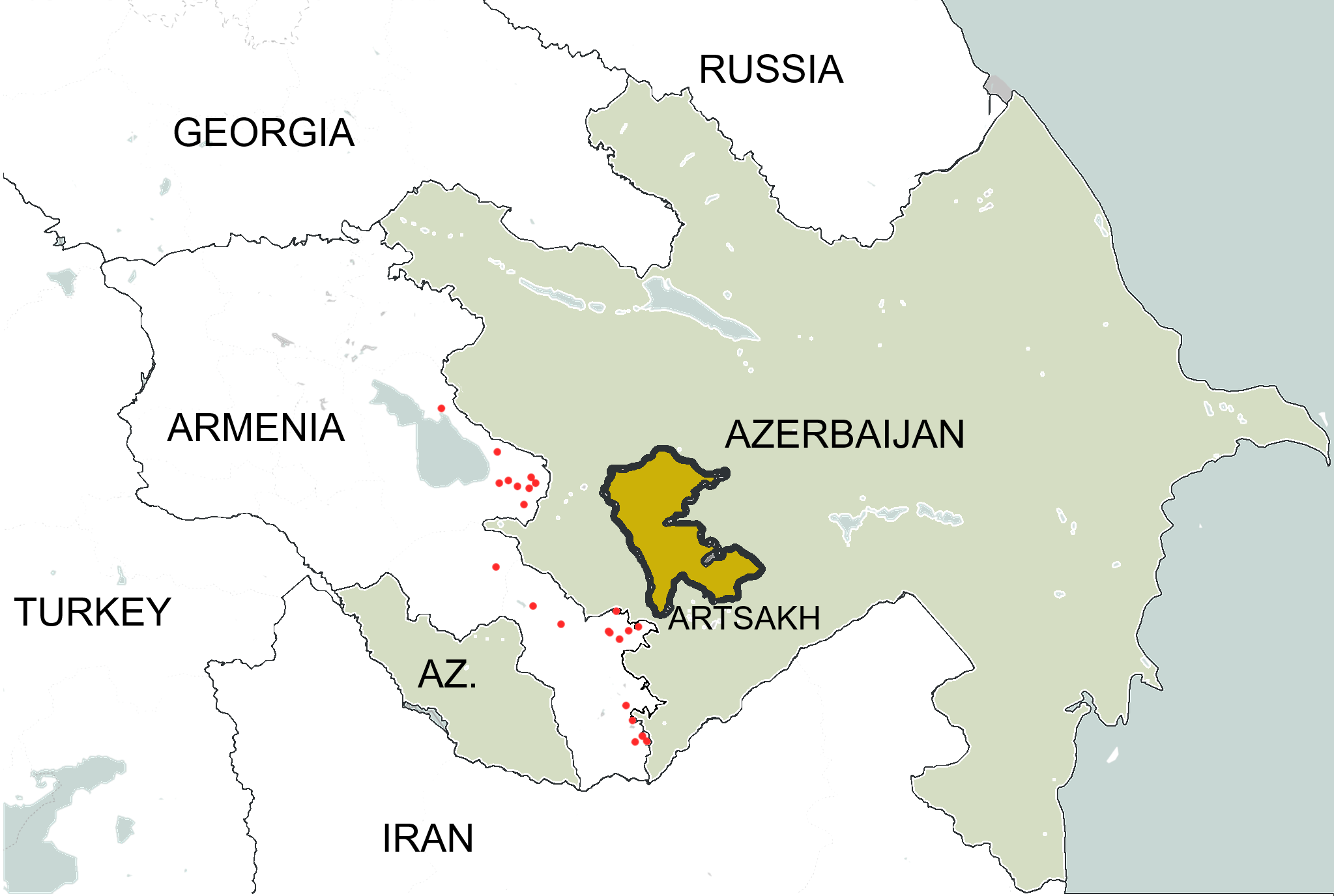
Azerbaijani strikes on Armenian territory between September 12 and 14, 2022

On the morning of 12 September 2022, Azerbaijan initiated an unprovoked invasion of Armenia, striking positions along a 200 km (100 mile) stretch of their shared border. Azerbaijan offensives hit 23 locations as far as 40 km (25 miles) within Armenia in the Syunik, Gegharkunik, and Vayots Dzor provinces. Azerbaijani forces attacked military and civilian positions in Vardenis, Goris, Sotk, Jermuk, and other cities with artillery, drones, and heavy weapons. At least 105 Armenian soldiers and 71 Azerbaijani military personnel were killed.

Azerbaijan claimed that Armenian forces had staged "large-scale subversive acts" using "saboteurs" who planted landmines, an allegation the government spread during the days following the invasion and also echoed by Azerbaijan's ally Turkey. Various journalists, politicians, and political analysts have scrutinized these allegations and consider them unfounded or unverifiable. Arkady Dubnov, a political scientist and expert on the Southern Caucasus said "This doesn't look convincing, and everyone understands that this was a contrived excuse. No Azeri officials have provided any evidence to substantiate the incursion."

According to Thomas de Waal, political analyst and author of several books on the Caucasus, some media outlets misleadingly described the fighting as "border clashes" and made reference to the disputed territory of Nagorno-Karabakh despite the fact "no fighting took place in Karabakh...or indeed in Azerbaijani territory; it was all inside the territory of Armenia." Around 30 or 40 towns and villages located in sovereign Armenian territory were attacked, resulting in 7,600 people being displaced. According to certain media reports Azerbaijan used large-calibre weapons such as Grad missiles to target civilian settlements. Azerbaijani President Aliyev later directly referred to the invasion in a speech, making irredentist statements about Armenian territory and confirming that Azerbaijan forces now control strategic highground in the area: "As a result of this [September 2022] military operation, our historical cities are now in front of our eyes through visual observation." Following Azerbaijan's attacks, pro-government media outlets and notable politicians within the country called for occupation of more Armenian land, claiming that a "buffer zone" was needed to deter "Armenian provocations.".

On 15 September 2022 at 12:20 a.m., Secretary of the Security Council of Armenia Armen Grigoryan announced that a ceasefire agreement had been reached between Armenia and Azerbaijan; however, Azerbaijan did not confirm the ceasefire in any public statement. The fighting ended with Azerbaijani troops taking control of new positions deep inside Armenia, with at least 7600 civilians displaced from Armenian provinces.

Due to Azerbaijan's September attacks of Armenia, various foreign embassies including those of France, Britain, and the United States, have issued travel advisories against visiting southern Armenia and areas which share a border with Azerbaijan, including the provinces of Syunik, Vayots Dzor, as well as southern Gegharkunik, and parts of Tavush.

=== October 2022 ===
On 6 October 2022, Prime Minister of Armenia Nikol Pashinyan and President of Azerbaijan Ilham Aliyev met at the first European Political Community summit in Prague in an attempt to resolve the long running Nagorno-Karabakh conflict and the recent Armenia–Azerbaijan border crisis. Following the meeting, it was stated that the two parties agreed to the deployment of a European Union led mission, which would be deployed on the Armenian side of their shared border for a period of two months, starting in October 2022. The stated aim of the mission is to "build confidence and, through its reports, to contribute to the border commissions" work towards delimitation of the border between the two parties. On October 12, nearly a month after Azerbaijan's attack, the Security Council of Armenia said there would be a peace deal between the two countries by the end of the year.

The OSCE also sent a Needs Assessment Team to Armenia between 21 and 27 October 2022, following a request made by the government of Armenia. The OSCE sent a group of international experts and representatives of the OSCE Secretariat to assess the situation in certain border areas along the Armenia–Azerbaijan border.

=== January 2023 ===
On 23 January, the European Union Mission in Armenia (EUMA) launched its operations. The objective of the CSDP mission is to contribute to stability in the border areas of Armenia, build confidence on the ground, conduct active patrolling and reporting, and to support normalization efforts between Armenia and Azerbaijan led by the President of the European Council, Charles Michel. EUMA will have an initial mandate of 2 years with the possibility of extension.

=== April 2023 ===
A skirmish resulting in 7 people dying occurred near the village of Tegh which is the last village on the Lachin Corridor in Armenia before it enters Azerbaijani territory. Video footage released by the Armenian Ministry of Defence showed Azerbaijani troops firing after approaching Armenian soldiers who were digging trenches along the border. The French Foreign Ministry issued a statement: "Armenia's territorial integrity must be respected and Azerbaijani forces occupying positions on the Armenian side of the line of contact must withdraw in order to prevent future incidents and preserve the foundations of a lasting peace in the region."

=== May 2023 ===
On 5 May, US Secretary of State Antony Blinken stated, "a peace agreement between Armenia and Azerbaijan is within reach," following the conclusion of four days of extensive negotiations held in Washington, D.C. Blinken confirmed that progress had been made and was hopeful that President Aliyev and Prime Minister Pashinyan would likely come up with a framework agreement on the sidelines of the 2nd European Political Community Summit to be held in Moldova in June 2023.

Following the negotiations held in the US, it was announced that Armenia and Azerbaijan would resume peace talks in Brussels. According to officials, Western entities are encouraging mediation efforts between the two sides. President Aliyev and Prime Minister Pashinyan are set to meet with European Council president Charles Michel, followed by another meeting with German chancellor Olaf Scholz and French president Emmanuel Macron.

Azerbaijani and Armenian forces exchanged artillery fire on 11 May along the border, near the town of Sotk in the Gegharkunik Province, leaving at least one soldier dead with several others wounded. Both sides traded blame. Tensions escalated after Azerbaijan installed a checkpoint to the Lachin corridor in 2022.

=== July 2023 ===
Nikol Pashinyan issued a warning that there is a likely chance of a third war unless both sides can reach a permanent peace.

=== September 2023 ===
On 3 September, during an interview, Armenian prime minister Nikol Pashinyan stated that it was a strategic mistake for Armenia to solely rely on Russia to guarantee its security. Pashinyan stated, "Moscow has been unable to deliver and is in the process of winding down its role in the wider South Caucasus region" and "the Russian Federation cannot meet Armenia's security needs. This example should demonstrate to us that dependence on just one partner in security matters is a strategic mistake." Pashinyan accused Russian peacekeepers of failing to uphold the ceasefire deal. Pashinyan confirmed that Armenia is trying to diversify its security arrangements, most notably with the European Union and the United States.

On 7 September, speaking at a meeting of senior government officials, Armenian prime minister Nikol Pashinyan accused Azerbaijan of building up an army on the Nagorno-Karabakh and Armenian borders.

=== February 2024 ===
Four Armenian soldiers were killed and one wounded on 13 February around the village of Nerkin Hand (Syunik), an area from which Azerbaijan previously had seized territory during its September 2022 attacks. Azerbaijan stated it had "completely destroyed" an Armenian defensive position in a staged "a revenge operation" for a "provocation" it said Armenian forces had committed the day before. Armenia denied the allegations. Azerbaijan dubbed its attack "Operation Revenge," a name it has used for several previous operations.

=== April 2024 ===
In April 2024, Armenia and Azerbaijan reached an agreement whereby Armenia handed over four abandoned villages along the border to Azerbaijan: Bağanis Ayrum, Aşağı Əskipara, Xeyrimli, and Qızılhacılı. The four villages were on the Azerbaijani side of the border and had been controlled by Armenia since the First Nagorno-Karabakh War. The two countries agreed to demarcate the borders on the basis of Alma-Ata declaration, which fixed the borders that existed between the former Soviet republics. This sparked protests among some residents of the neighboring villages of Tavush province. The agreement was welcomed by the U.S. Secretary of State Antony Blinken, President of the European Council Charles Michel, on behalf of the UN Secretary-General António Guterres, his spokesperson Stéphane Dujarric. On May 24, 2024, the State Border Service of Azerbaijan took control of the four villages.

=== November 2024 ===
On 7 November 2024, during the 5th European Political Community Summit, Armenian Minister of Foreign Affairs Ararat Mirzoyan participated in a meeting organized by Péter Szijjártó, the Minister of Foreign Affairs and Trade of Hungary. Mirzoyan discussed regional issues and presented the latest developments in the process of normalization of relations between Armenia and Azerbaijan, including the border delimitation process between the two countries and efforts towards the conclusion of a peace treaty.

== Genocide risk for Armenians ==
Historical and contemporary analyses from multiple scholars, genocide experts, and human rights observers state that Azerbaijan and Turkey aim to eliminate the Armenian presence throughout the South Caucasus: sometimes arguing that Azerbaijan's actions are an extension of the 1915 Ottoman genocide against Armenians, with emphasis on military attempts to seize Armenia's Syunik region, and Azerbaijan's expansionist concept of "Western Azerbaijan" which claims Armenian territory.

Multiple genocide prevention advocates have expressed concern over these developments and warned of the growing risk of genocide against Armenians in the Caucasus:

The Lemkin Institute for Genocide Prevention has criticized the international community for not adequately addressing the situation and has stated that the seizure of Armenia's Syunik region would "realize the pan-Turkic dream that fueled the Armenian Genocide of 1915-1923," adding that Azerbaijan's "actions extend far beyond mere territorial disputes, touching upon the very existence of Armenia and Armenians in what is left of their ancestral homeland." The International Association of Genocide Scholars states that Azerbaijan's September 2022 attacks displaced over 7000 civilians "in an attempt to ethnically cleanse Armenians from a large portion of the Republic of Armenia," noting Azerbaijan's history of hate speech and cultural destruction towards Armenians and Armenian culture. The Fund for Peace states that Azerbaijan's military offensives have increased the fragility of the Armenian state, noting "the risk of genocide against Armenians in Azerbaijan, Nagorno-Karabakh, and Armenia." Genocide Watch states that "Azerbaijan will amputate one limb of the Armenian body after another until Armenia is beheaded. Armenians will never be safe under Azerbaijani rule. Peace for Armenians will only come when they can live freely in their own homeland....the U.S. and NATO should demand that Azerbaijan stop its invasions of Armenian homelands."

According to former first ICC prosecutor, Luis Moreno Ocampo, a "genocidal strategy was implemented in sovereign Armenia's provinces of Gegarkunik, Syunik, Vayots Dzor, and Ararat in May 2021, resulting in the unlawful, forcible displacement of at least 3,000 ethnic Armenians," adding that "Azerbaijan’s parliament confirmed its genocidal intent by adopting a resolution...claiming its sovereignty over the entirety of Armenian territory and marking the first genocide adopted by a parliament." Henry Theriault writes that "With every new incursion into Armenian Republic lands, with every destruction of an Armenian church in Artsakh, with every fabricated proclamation about Armenian commission of genocide against Azeris, Talat, Enver, and Cemal’s fantasy of the final end of Armenians in Asia Minor—and around the world—becomes more and more real."

== Situation in Nagorno-Karabakh ==
=== Current situation ===
Since March 26, 2023, the Azerbaijani government has formalized its blockade of the Republic of Artsakh by seizing strategic ground around the Lachin corridor both within Artsakh and Armenia, installing a military outpost that blocks a bypass dirt road that provided relief, blocking the old section of the Lachin corridor, and installing a checkpoint at the new section. Azerbaijan has ignored calls from the Russian peacekeepers to observe the 2020 ceasefire conditions and return to their initial territorial positions behind the Line of Contact. Azerbaijan has also ignored calls from the International Court of Justice, the European Court of Human Rights, and other international entities to restore freedom of movement across the Lachin corridor.

=== Timeline ===
On 11 October 2021, an Armenian civilian named Aram Tepnants was shot dead by Azerbaijani snipers in the town of Martakert. Russia's Ministry of Defense confirmed the incident and stated that Russian peacekeepers launched an investigation involving both sides.

On 8 November 2021, one Armenian civilian was killed and three wounded as Azerbaijani troops opened fire at Armenians repairing a water supply pipe near Shushi. Russia's Ministry of Defense confirmed the incident and stated that Russian peacekeepers launched an investigation involving both sides. The U.S. Department of State Bureau of European and Eurasian Affairs condemned the killing of the Armenian civilian. On 8 March, it was reported that the only gas pipeline leading from Armenia to the Armenian-inhabited enclave of Artsakh was damaged, as tension spiked in the region following the launch of Russian invasion of Ukraine. The energy supply was reportedly disrupted again on the evening of March 21. Armenian Prime Minister Nikol Pashinyan and Artsakh authorities have accused the Azerbaijan government of deliberately creating additional humanitarian problems for the population of Artsakh.

On 24 March, Azerbaijani soldiers crossed the Line of Contact and took control of the village of Farukh, using firearms and drones, with women and children being evacuated from the nearby village of Khramort. Russian peacekeepers were reported to be negotiating with Azerbaijan. On 27 March 2022, the Russian Defense Ministry reported that Azerbaijani forces had withdrawn from the village. This statement was refuted by the Azerbaijani Ministry of Defense. On 30 March 2022, Artsakh authorities stated that Azerbaijani forces were still occupying the strategically important Karaglukh heights. On 15 April 2022 Azerbaijani forces crossed the Line of Contact near the village of Seysulan. Later that day, they reportedly agreed to pull back.

Clashes broke out again in late July and early August 2022. On August 1, the Artsakh Defence Army reported that Azerbaijan attempted to breach the line of contact in northern Nagorno-Karabakh, wounding one soldier. Azerbaijan Defence Ministry denied these claims, and the Russian Defence Ministry reported no ceasefire violations that day.

Over the next two days, clashes erupted again, killing one Azerbaijani soldier, two Artsakh Defence Army soldiers, and wounding 14 others. The international community reacted quickly, with Russia accusing Azerbaijan of breaking the fragile ceasefire and the European Union urging an immediate cessation of hostilities.

According to the Azerbaijani Defence Ministry, Artsakhi soldiers had attacked Azerbaijan army posts in the area of Lachin, killing a conscript. In response, the Azerbaijani army stated it conducted an operation called "Revenge" and took control of several strategic heights in Karabakh. The Artsakh Defence Army accused Azerbaijan of violating the ceasefire and declared a partial mobilization. Following the flare-up, Armenia urged the international community to assist in putting an end to Azerbaijan's "aggressive actions".

On 26 August, the Azerbaijani armed forces took full control of the Lachin Corridor area including Lachin and the villages of Zabukh and Sus as part of the 2020 cease-fire agreement.

On 14 September, the Azerbaijani military violated the ceasefire in Nagorno-Karabakh in the early hours of Thursday. Azerbaijani forces used small arms in the shooting in the region.

On 19 September, Azerbaijan launched a military offensive in Nagorno-Karabakh. The offensive ended with the 2023 Nagorno-Karabakh ceasefire agreement and the disbandment of the Artsakh Defence Army. It led to the dissolution of the Republic of Artsakh and the flight of Nagorno-Karabakh Armenians.

== Reactions ==
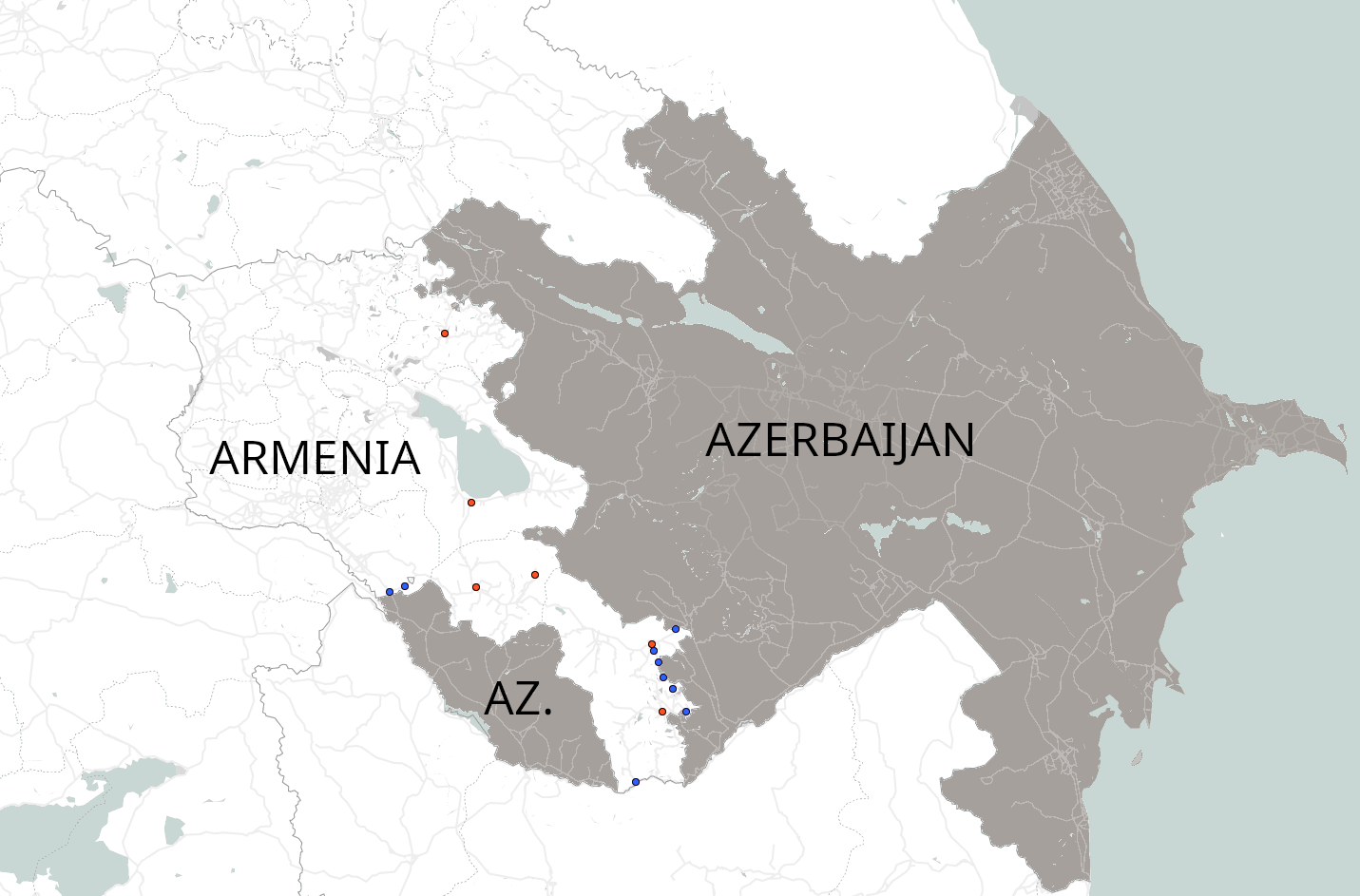
Following the 2020 Nagorno-Karabakh War, the Russian military increased its presence within Armenia. Meanwhile, the European Union initiated a civilian monitoring mission in Armenia to ensure stability in the border areas with Azerbaijan. Blue points correspond to locations of increased Russian military presence. Red points correspond to current or future field offices of the European Union Mission in Armenia (EUMA).

Various countries, supranational organizations, and human rights organizations have called for an end to the hostilities and supporting bilateral border demarcation, respecting the terms of the 2020 ceasefire agreement, and for Azerbaijan to pull back its forces from Armenian territory.

Following the 2020 Nagorno-Karabakh War, both Russia and the European Union have increased their presence in Armenia along the border with Azerbaijan in order to improve stability of the border and deter offensives from Azerbaijan. Upon Armenia's request, Russia's Federal Security Service expanded its patrols within Armenia and the EU contributed a civilian monitoring mission to Armenia. However, while both entities have deterred the possibility of full-scale warfare, they have been unable to fully prevent Azerbaijan's goals.

Russia and the European Union have criticized each other's presence within Armenia. The European Union encouraged Armenia to seek alternative security alliances given "Russia's alleged readiness to guarantee the security of Armenia has proven to be non-existent." Russia, in turn, criticized the EU and claims it is an effort by the West to diminish Russia's power in the region. In January 2023, an EU official said that there were cases where EUMCAP monitors were turned back by Russian border guards within Armenia, even though they were accompanied by Armenian Defense officials.

=== Supranational organizations ===
- European Union – The European Parliament declared that the entry of troops from Azerbaijan into the territory of Armenia amount to a violation of the territorial integrity of Armenia and of international law; whereas this violation of Armenian sovereign territory follows worrying statements by Azerbaijani representatives, including the president, which appeared to raise territorial claims and threaten the use of force and thereby undermine the efforts towards security and stability in the region. The European Parliament also issued a report in March 2023, condemning Azerbaijan's attack of Armenia in 2022 and—considering CSTO's inaction during the invasion—encouraged Armenia to seek alternative security alliances. Following the November 2021 escalation, the EU Delegation for relations with the South Caucasus released a statement expressing serious concern over the "military operation launched by Azerbaijan in response to alleged provocations" and condemned "any attempts at "borderisation", as observed since the incursion of Azerbaijani troops into Armenian territory on 12 May". MEPs also condemned "Turkey's expansionist and destabilizing role in the South Caucasus" given that it is Azerbaijan's traditional ally in the conflict.
- Council of Europe – The organization issued a report stating "While it is difficult to negotiate with a party [Azerbaijan] keen to employ hate rhetoric and even denying Armenia's territorial integrity, it is crucial for Armenia to continue to do its utmost to contribute to the de-escalation of the tensions on the ground." Secretary General Marija Pejčinović Burić stated, "Reports of escalating armed hostilities around the Armenian-Azerbaijani border are very alarming. Disagreements between Council of Europe member States must be resolved peacefully through negotiations. Recent direct contacts between the highest authorities of both countries were promising and should be continued. When entering the Council of Europe, Armenia and Azerbaijan committed to resolve the conflict peacefully. That commitment must be respected. The Council of Europe is ready to assist in reconciliation efforts which contribute to achieving a peaceful settlement".
- (Organization for Security and Co-operation in Europe) OSCE – The U.S. representative stated, "We expect Azerbaijan to pull back all forces and call on both sides to begin immediately negotiations to demarcate their shared international borders." The Co-Chairs of the Minsk Group took note of the reported detention of six Armenian soldiers on 27 May and called for the release of all prisoners of war and other detainees on an all for all basis. Together, the Council of Europe, the OSCE also offered diplomatic services to resolve the conflict which privately "outraged" Baku.
- Collective Security Treaty Organization – a military alliance in Eurasia consisting of several post-Soviet states, declared that it is closely monitoring the situation evolving in Syunik and if necessary, measures will be taken according to CSTO policy. The CSTO declined to provide assistance to Armenia in both May 2021 and September 2022. Former Secretary General Nikolay Bordyuzha said that only in the most extreme case would the organization use force against a former Soviet Republic.
- NATO – Javier Colomina, special Representative for the Caucasus & Central Asia, called for 'an immediate cessation of hostilities and urgent de-escalation'.

=== Countries ===
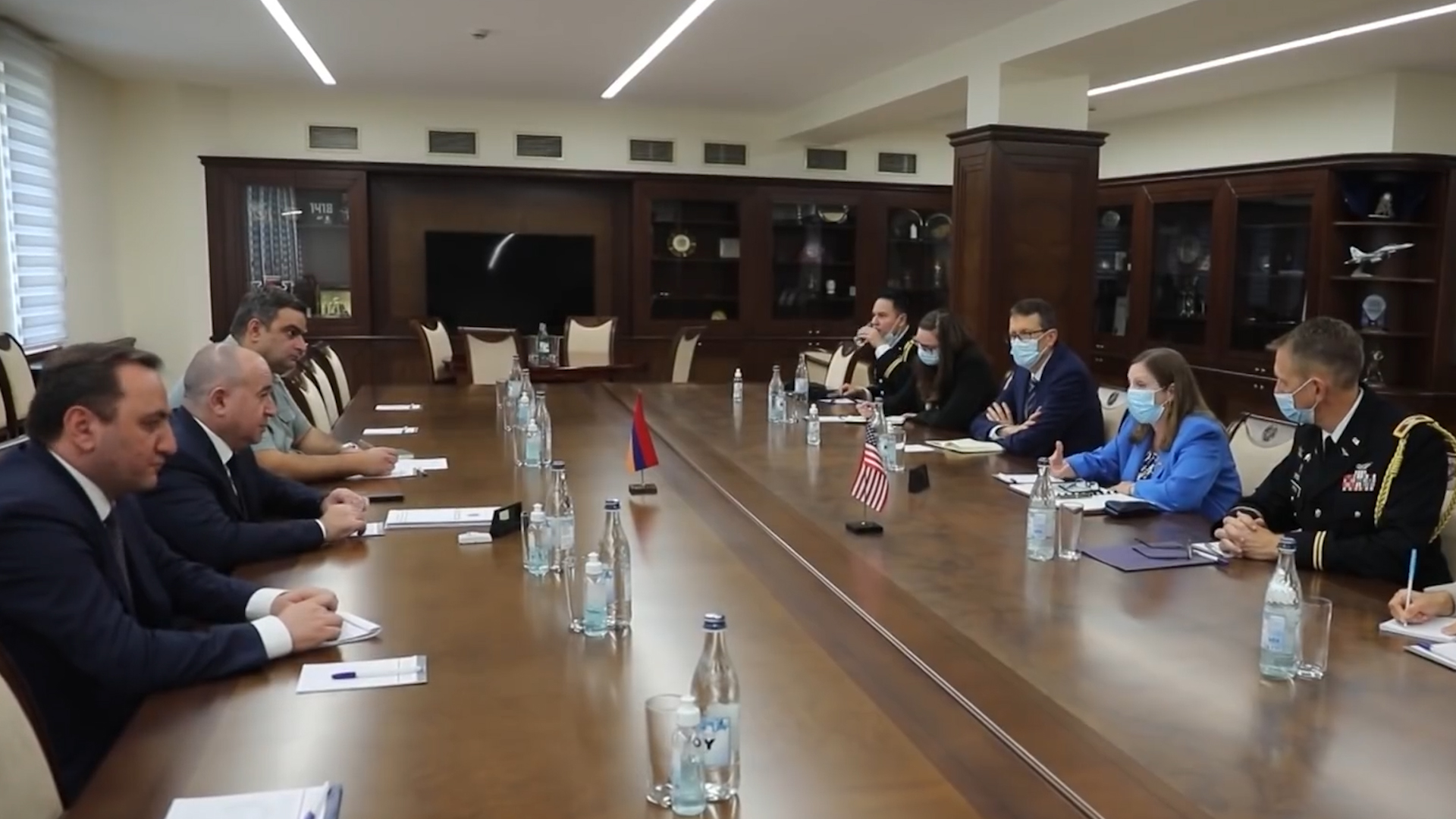
Arshak Karapetyan and Lynne Tracy discussed the situation on the Armenian-Azerbaijani border on 30 August 2020.

- Canada – Commenting on Azerbaijan's September 2022 attacks, Foreign Minister Mélanie Joly tweeted that "Canada is very concerned by the rise in hostilities between Armenia and Azerbaijan, including strikes against settlements and civilian infrastructure inside Armenia. We urge for de-escalation, full respect of the ceasefire, and return to meaningful dialogue via the OSCE."
- Estonia – Marina Kaljurand, foreign minister, MEP, and chair of the Delegation for Relations with the South Caucasus, condemned Azerbaijan's "large-scale military attack", adding that Azerbaijan is "taking advantage of the global and regional situation created by the aggression of Russia against Ukraine".
- France – Following Azerbaijan's incursions in May 2021, President Emmanuel Macron wrote "Azerbaijan's armed forces have invaded Armenian territory. They must be immediately withdrawn."
- India – Commenting on Azerbaijan's September 2022 attacks, the spokesperson of the Foreign Ministry called on the "aggressor side to immediately cease hostilities" adding that they "have seen reports of attacks along the Armenia-Azerbaijan border, including targeting of civilian settlements and infrastructure."
- Iran – Mojtaba Zolnouri, the head of the Islamic Consultative Assembly's National Security and Foreign Policy Committee, declared that Tehran will categorically not accept any change in international borders in the region and that the territorial integrity of the countries in the region must be preserved. "Therefore, if part of the territory of Armenia is to be taken and our border conditions change, that is, to have a new neighbor, it is not acceptable for us," Zolnouri said. Later, in a meeting with the acting Armenian Foreign Minister, the Iranian Foreign Minister Mohammad Javad Zarif confirmed that any redrawing of the borders is a red line for Iran. Analysts consider Iran's decision to open a consulate in Syunik in August 2022 to be an expression of diplomatic support for Armenia's territorial integrity. Iran has also offered diplomatic mediation assistance in July 2021 after fighting along the border.
- Pakistan – The Ministry of Foreign Affairs reaffirmed the support from people and government of Pakistan for Azerbaijan on Nagorno-Karabakh conflict. Pakistan is the only country in the world that does not recognize Armenia as a country since the creation of new states of Azerbaijan and Armenia after collapse of Soviet union to show a solidarity and support with Azerbaijani people on Nagorno-Karabkh conflict.
- Russia – President Vladimir Putin urged both countries to respect the ceasefire agreement, and that Russia will continue mediating efforts. Putin's spokesman Dmitry Peskov stated that "The Armenian side expressed extreme concern over the situation at the border", and that "President Putin shared this concern". Russian Foreign Minister Sergey Lavrov stated that Russia sees no reason to escalate emotions with regard to the situation at the border: "Not a single shot was fired, no skirmishes took place there. They sat down, calmly began to discuss how to defuse this situation, and asked us for assistance. Our military provided such assistance, an agreement was reached. I do not see any reason to escalate emotions in connection with this quite non-routine, but in any case calmly settled issue."
- Turkey – The AKP's spokesperson, Ömer Çelik, condemned Armenia's "aggressive policies"; and also said, "We condemn this attack in the strongest manner." Çelik added that Turkey would oppose Armenian efforts to "endanger" the region. He also criticized France's pro-Armenia response; urging other countries to condemn "Armenian attacks". Celik clarified that "Turkey will support Azerbaijan in whatever they want" and accused Armenia of violating Azerbaijan's territorial integrity.
- United States – The State Department initially voiced concerns regarding "increased tensions along a non-demarcated portion of the Armenia-Azerbaijan border", urging "restraint in de-escalating the situation peacefully". Later on, U.S. State Department spokeswoman Jalina Porter stated that the United States were monitoring the situation closely, and that it expected Azerbaijan to "immediately pull back its forces" and "cease further provocation":

The United States is concerned by recent developments along the international border between Armenia and Azerbaijan, including the detention of several Armenian soldiers by Azerbaijani forces. We call on both sides to urgently and peacefully resolve this incident. We also continue to call on Azerbaijan to release immediately all prisoners of war and other detainees, and we remind Azerbaijan of its obligations under international humanitarian law to treat all detainees humanely.

In his 27 May 2021 press statement, U.S. State Department spokesperson Ned Price stated that the U.S. considers any movements along the non-demarcated areas of the international border between Armenia and Azerbaijan to be provocative and unnecessary and rejects the use of force to demarcate the border, calling on both sides to return to their previous positions and to cease military fortification of the non-demarcated border and the emplacement of landmines. Specifically, the U.S. called on Azerbaijan and Armenia to relocate their forces to the positions they held on 11 May, to de-escalate tensions, and create space for a peaceful negotiation process to demarcate the border on an urgent basis. During his visit to Foreign Ministry of Armenia on 10 June 2021, the Acting U.S. Assistant Secretary for European and Eurasian Affairs Philip Reeker reaffirmed the U.S. position on the necessity to withdraw Azerbaijani forces from Armenian border. Senator Bob Menendez, Chairman of the Senate Foreign Relations Committee, wrote a letter in February 2023 criticizing the US Commerce Department for exporting weapons to Azerbaijan, highlighting "well-documented and credible allegations of Azerbaijan's atrocities against Armenians – including the deaths and displacement of thousands of Armenians in the wake of the 2020 Nagorno Karabakh War, the 2022 invasion of Armenia, in addition to Baku's ongoing blockade of the Lachin Corridor."

=== Other organizations ===
- Reporters Without Borders – reported on 23 June 2021 that a group of Spanish journalists have been threatened with death by Azerbaijani forces while reporting on their position in the Gegharkunik province. RWB condemned "this unacceptable act toward journalists".
- Freedom House – condemned Azerbaijan's attacks on Armenia, stating "military attacks on sovereign nations have no place in the rules-based international order". The organization also said "With its dependence on authoritarian Russia for military protection against Azerbaijan, its openly hostile and equally authoritarian neighbor, Armenia's democratic project faces uniquely powerful headwinds," adding that "there are abundant indications that an expansion of Baku's control over...parts of Armenia would eliminate the freedoms and security of local people in much the same way [as Moscow's seizure of Ukrainian territory]".
- Human Rights Watch – analyzed several videos of inhumane killings of Armenian prisoners-of-war by Azerbaijani forces, describing them as war crimes: Hugh Williamson, Europe and Central Asia director at Human Rights Watch said "These soldiers had been captured and laid down their arms. Their captors had an obligation to treat them humanely, and instead it appears that Azerbaijani forces shot them in cold blood. Now they need to be held accountable."
- Armenian National Committee of America – Its program director, Alex Galitsky, wrote "by violating Armenia's sovereignty, Baku has demonstrated that this conflict was never truly about the principle of territorial integrity for Azerbaijan. After all, if Azerbaijan's objectives were limited to territorial control, there would not have been systematic destruction of Armenian cultural heritage sites, the deliberate targeting of civilians, and exceedingly inflammatory rhetoric from the regime in Baku seeking to erase the very existence of the Armenian people."
- Helsinki Citizens' Assembly of Vanadzor – Artur Sakunts, a human rights activist and chair of the organization wrote "If Armenia does not show determination now and does not get out of the deadlock of the CSTO-Eurasian Union-trilateral statement of November 9, 2020 and does not take a step toward becoming part of the United States-France-European Union civilized system, then Putin, Erdogan and Aliyev will devour Armenia."
- Fund for Peace – The institute wrote, "The most recent attacks [by Azerbaijan in September 2022] are, in part, responsible for Armenia's rise from 97th to 93rd most fragile state this year, and even more significantly, the rise from 108th most fragile in 2019," adding that "As peace talks between Armenia and Azerbaijan continue, the international community has the opportunity to support genocide prevention in Armenia and Azerbaijan."
- The Lemkin Institute for Genocide Prevention – issued multiple alerts stating that an Azerbaijani invasion of Armenia runs a "high risk of genocide," and identified Azerbaijan's expansionist "Western Azerbaijan" territorial claims to Syunik as a longstanding pan-Turkic ambition. Commenting on Azeri-Armenian negotiations, the organization stated that "there is no reason to believe that Azerbaijan will abide by any treaty or that its expansionist ambitions will stop with Artsakh."
- World Federalist Movement – Following Azerbaijan's September 2022 attacks, the organization said "This aggression was predictable in light of the international community's failure to condemn Azerbaijan and Turkey's war crimes during the 44-day war and the community's mute response to post 2020 developments, lacking any condemnation of actions by Baku." The organization also called for the international community to act, stating that "the sanctions that should be applied against Azerbaijan should be similar to those applied against Russia by the western powers as both are threat to democracies."

== Analysis ==
=== Azerbaijan's position ===
Azerbaijan has defended its military activities within sovereign Armenian territory using various narratives: claiming that, without formal border demarcation its soldiers cannot be accused of occupation, its soldiers were merely accessing Azerbaijani territory inaccessible due to poor weather conditions, it is responding to Armenian "provocations", and that it is defending Azerbaijan's "territorial integrity". Azerbaijan has also frequently given "Revenge" titles to its military operations against Armenia and Artsakh, claiming that it is exacting retribution for alleged deaths of its soldiers. Azerbaijani media outlets and notable politicians within the country called for occupation of more Armenian land after Azerbaijan's September 2022 attacks, claiming that a "buffer zone" was needed to deter "Armenian provocations."

Various journalists, politicians, and political analysts have scrutinized several of these allegations and consider them unfounded or unverifiable. Political analysts and genocide scholars say that Azerbaijan employs a mirroring tactic which is common among genocidal regimes and here "involves accusing Armenia and Armenians of committing the crimes that it itself has committed or is planning to commit."

Commenting on Azerbaijan's May 2021 incursion, Eurasianet noted "while those [Soviet-era] maps were not meant to strictly delineate an international border, they do all appear to show that most of Sev Lake is in Armenian territory, which would mean an [Azerbaijani] attempt to surround it would be an infiltration." According to cartographer Rouben Galichian, Azerbaijan's claims to enclaves within Armenia is inconsistent with Azerbaijan’s Declaration of Independence which claims it to be the heir of the Azerbaijan Democratic Republic (1918-1920) rather than the Azeri Soviet Republic (1920-1991). The cartographer states that between 1918-1920, there were no enclaves in Armenia or Azerbaijan (including Nakhichevan and Artsakh) and that the Soviets gifted over 3000 square kilometers of Armenian territory to Azerbaijan between 1928 and 1948, including the Al Lakes, territory intervening Armenia and Artsakh, and various slices of Syunik (Zangezur).

Critics have argued that Azerbaijan's September 2022 attacks on Armenia undermined the government's official narrative of "territorial integrity", noting that for the last 10 years Azerbaijan has increasingly promoted expansionist territorial claims against sovereign Armenian territory (distinct from Nagorno-Karabakh).

=== "Borderization" of Armenia ===
Borderization refers to the physical demarcation of a border which prevents the free movement of people and goods.

Laurence Broers, South Caucasus programme director at London-based peacebuilding organization Conciliation Resources, wrote "Azerbaijan's attack demonstrated the potential for Armenia to be cut in two, given it is a mere 40 kilometres (25 miles) across at its narrowest point." Laurence Broers also says that Azerbaijan's motivations are to have Armenia formally relinquish any claim to Artsakh: "Baku is seeking to avoid a repeat of the 1990s – where the militarily victorious side, then Armenia, was not able to consolidate its victory into a favorable peace from a position of strength."

The analyst argues that Azerbaijan is using "coercive bargaining strategy" in order to extract concessions from Armenia on various issues, including minefield maps, the Syunik corridor, and that never-demarcated borders allow conversion of dated or ambiguous cartographies into better positions for Azerbaijan. This "borderization", according to Broers, also pressures Russia by showing that Russian security guarantees to Armenia are tractable relative to other issues; testing CSTO collective security guarantees and testing Russia's capacity to broker. Broers further expanded on the theme of "borderization" of Armenia by Azerbaijan in his review published by Chatham House. The tactics applied by Azerbaijan towards Armenia after the 2020 war were described as "borderization" tactics in an article published in the Georgetown Journal of International Affairs on June 16, 2021. Joint statement on 17 November 2021 by the Chair of the Delegation for relations with the South Caucasus, Marina Kaljurand, the European Parliament's Standing Rapporteur on Armenia Andrey Kovatchev and the European Parliament's Standing Rapporteur on Azerbaijan, Željana Zovko called the military operation launched by Azerbaijan on 16 November 2021 the worst violation to-date since ceasefire agreement, condemning any attempts at "borderisation", as observed since the incursion of Azerbaijani troops into Armenian territory on 12 May 2021.

According to the geopolitical intelligence firm Stratfor, "Azerbaijan remains unlikely to launch a large-scale military operation to seize large swaths of new territory in Nagorno-Karabakh or Armenia, as less costly methods can enable Baku to maintain progress toward its goals. Each time Azerbaijani forces gain ground, it improves their tactical position — even if those territorial gains only move the de facto line of contact by a matter of meters."

=== Inaction of Russia and the Collective Security Treaty Organization ===
Russia is ostensibly Armenia's security guarantor due to the countries sharing a bilateral security alliance and their joint membership in the Collective Security Treaty Organization (CSTO) which stipulates that members assist each other in order to protect territorial integrity:

In the case of aggression (an armed attack threatening safety, stability, territorial integrity and sovereignty) against any Member States, all other Member States at request of this Member State shall immediately provide the latter with the necessary aid, including military."

— CSTO charter, Article 4

However, neither Russia nor other members of the military alliance are providing military assistance against Azerbaijan's offensive. Various political analysts and politicians have said that Azerbaijan's attacks were emboldened by Russia's preoccupation with its invasion of Ukraine, Azerbaijan's military ties with Russia, Azerbaijan's economic ties with Russia other European powers, and Russia's own interest in creating the "Zangezur corridor."

Armenia requested CSTO's assistance two times, following various territorial incursions by Azerbaijan: in March 2021. and in September 2022. The CSTO declined Armenia's request both times. Instead of providing immediate assistance following Azerbaijan's September 2022 attack, the CSTO opted to send a "fact-finding mission" one week later and stated that it did not anticipate sending military aid even before the mission arrived.

The CSTO's inaction in helping Armenia prompted the European Parliament to encourage Armenia to seek alternative security alliances. Nerses Kopalyan, a political scientist, wrote that "The Russian peacekeepers function more like an impotent observation mission than an armed contingent."

Nikolay Bordyuzha, the former longtime secretary general of the CSTO said "the issue is Armenian territory, the ownership of which is not under question," adding that "the entire international community sees this territory as the sovereign territory of Armenia. According to its own documents, the CSTO is obliged to react in the case of an incursion by the armed forces of another state." Neil Hauer, a journalist specializing in the Caucasus points out that Azerbaijan's September 2022 invasion of Armenia occurred only a few days after Russia's forces experienced military setbacks in Ukraine's Kharkiv region and the "CSTO was exposed as a paper tiger."

=== Inaction of the European Union ===
Various critics argue that the conflict is not being presented in the West in the same light as the Russian invasion of Ukraine despite the fact that Armenia is making democratic reforms against Azerbaijan's increasingly authoritarian state.

Azerbaijan is a major exporter of oil and gas to Europe and, with the aim to reduce its dependence on Russian imports, the European Union signed a gas-supply agreement with Azerbaijan in July 2022, which has been perceived as emboldening Azerbaijan's actions. However, political scientist, Suren Surenyants, considers it positive that European MEPs have "declared the September military actions [by Azerbaijan] an occupation and did not link this aggression with the Nagorno-Karabakh conflict." But Surenyants does not expect Azerbaijan's occupation of Armenia to end without concrete action from the international community: "Azerbaijanis are carrying out engineering work on the sovereign Armenian territory, equipping positions. Not a single international structure, not a single geopolitical center created a situation for Aliyev in which he would be forced to leave these territories." The EU has attempted to mediate a "peace agreement" between Armenia and Azerbaijan that includes a Joint Border Commission to delimit the countries' mutual boundary line. Commenting on this, Tigran Grigoryan, a political analyst said "What I'm seeing now is an attempt by the European Union [...] to establish a victor's peace at the expense of Armenia where Armenian interests are not taken into consideration at all." The EU has treated both Armenia and Azerbaijan as equal parties despite the asymmetry in military and political power between the countries. The EU's response to the ethnic cleansing of Armenians of Nagorno-Karabakh has been limited to vague statements that are bothsidist in nature, without naming the aggressor. Since the 2020 war, every military escalation has resulted Azerbaijani forces gaining ground, which political scientist Karena Avedissian, describes as the "creeping annexation" of Nagorno-Karabakh and Armenia.

In July 2024, European Council President Charles Michel urged Armenia and Azerbaijan to finalize a peace agreement amid rising tensions, following Azerbaijan's recent offensive in Nagorno-Karabakh and ongoing border disputes.

== See also ==
- First Nagorno-Karabakh War
- List of conflicts between Armenia and Azerbaijan
- 2020 Nagorno-Karabakh ceasefire agreement
- List of conflicts in territory of the former Soviet Union
- Second Nagorno-Karabakh War
- September 2022 Armenia–Azerbaijan clashes
- 2023 Azerbaijani offensive in Nagorno-Karabakh
- 2024 Armenian protests
