= Gegharkunik =

Gegharkunik may refer to:

- Gegharkunik Province, Armenia
  - Gegharkunik, Gegharkunik, a town
- Gegharkunik Lake, now Lake Sevan, Armenia
