= Western Azerbaijan =

Western Azerbaijan may refer to:

- Western Azerbaijan (irredentist concept), Azerbaijani irredentist concept denoting the Republic of Armenia
- West Azerbaijan province, in Iran

== See also ==
- Nakhchivan Autonomous Republic, autonomous exclave of the Republic of Azerbaijan
- Nakhichevan Autonomous Soviet Socialist Republic (1921–1990), autonomous republic of the Azerbaijan SSR
