= Lake Sev =

Lake in Armenia and Azerbaijan

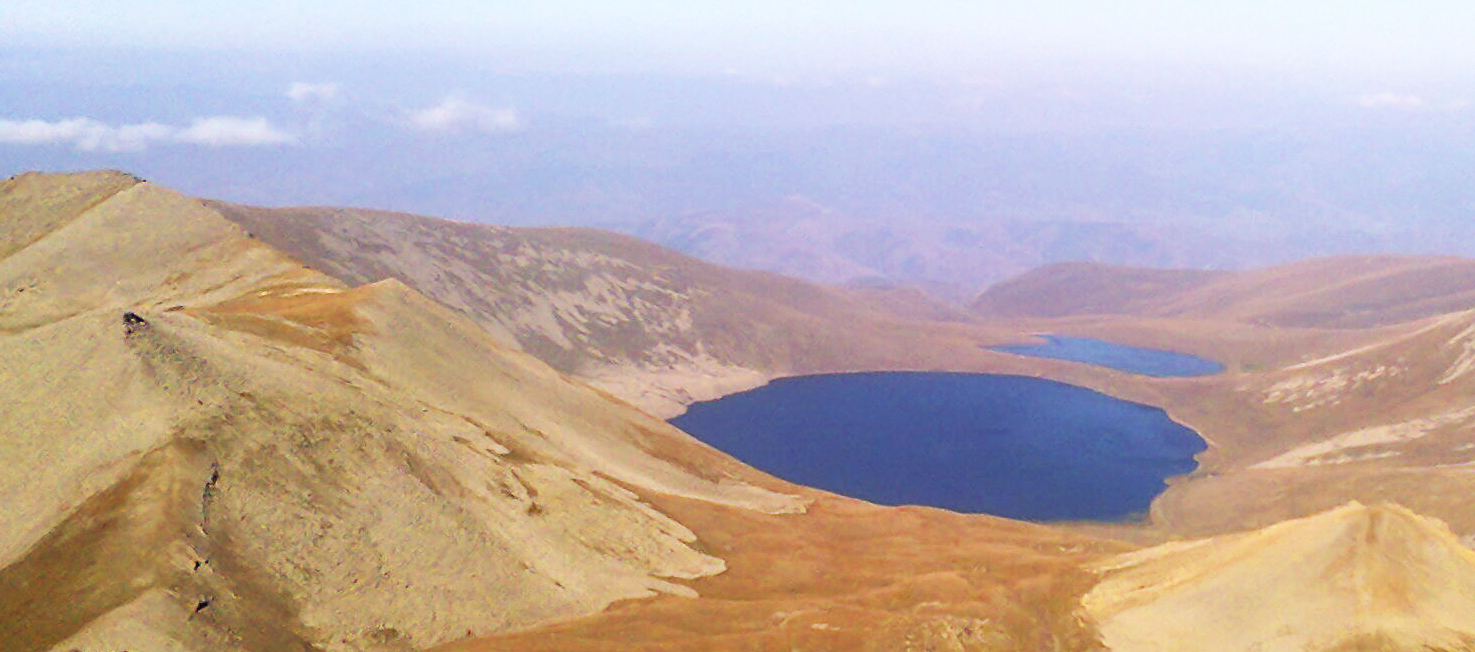
- Lake Sev as seen from the peak of Mets Ishkhanasar mountain in Armenia

- Location within Armenia Location within Azerbaijan Location within Caucasus Mountains
- Interactive map of Lake Sev
- Location: Syunik Province, Armenia; Lachin District, Azerbaijan
- Coordinates: 39°35′53″N 46°13′54″E
- Max. length: 1.6 km (0.99 mi)
- Max. width: 1.2 km (0.75 mi)
- Surface area: 2 km^{2} (0.77 sq mi)
- Average depth: 7.5 m (25 ft)
- Water volume: 9 hm^{3} (7,300 acre⋅ft)
- Surface elevation: 2,666 m (8,747 ft)

Lake Sev (Armenian: Սև լիճ, romanized: Sev lich; Azerbaijani: Qaragöl; both meaning "black lake") is a lake located on the border between Armenia and Azerbaijan. It is split between the Syunik Province of Armenia and the Lachin District of Azerbaijan, with the overwhelming majority of the lake being in Armenia.

== Topography ==
The lake is located to the east of Mets Ishkhanasar mountain at an altitude of 2,666 metres (8,747 feet) above sea level and has an area of about 2 square kilometres (0.77 square miles). It is 1.6 kilometres (0.99 miles) long, 1.2 kilometres (0.75 miles) wide, and has a maximum depth of 7.5 metres (25 feet). The lake is inhabited by Ishkhan salmonid fish. The lake water is used for irrigation. It is immediately adjacent to a smaller lake called Janlich or Jinli.

== Nature reserve ==
Lake Sev and the area immediately around it are a protected nature conservation area called the Lake Sev Nature Reserve, in the Syunik Province on the eastern slope of Mets Ishkhanasar. It was re-created in 2001 on the grounds of the protected area with the same name, created in 1987. It has a surface of 240 hectares. Furthermore, it aims to preserve the ecosystem of Lake Sev.

== 2021 Armenia–Azerbaijan border crisis ==
Lake Sev and the surrounding area are currently the subject of a border crisis between Azerbaijan and Armenia. On 12 May 2021, Azerbaijani troops advanced some 3.5 kilometres into Armenian territory near the lake and occupied the nearby height of Mets Ishkhanasar. Although the international border between Armenia and Azerbaijan has never been formally delineated, Soviet-era maps all appear to show that most of Sev Lake is in Armenian territory, which would mean an attempt to surround it would be an infiltration. Specifically, the 1975 map of the General Staff of the USSR Armed Forces numbered J-38-21 scaled 1:100 000 shows Lake Sev with its eastern, western and southern shores located in the territory of the Armenian SSR and only a section of the northern shore of the lake covering nearly 10% of the lake located in the Azerbaijani SSR. The map also shows the adjacent smaller Lake Janlich (Jinli) as entirely in Armenian territory.
