= List of conflicts between Armenia and Azerbaijan =

The following is a list of armed conflicts between Armenia and Azerbaijan, including their modern predecessor states.

Conflict	Start	Finish	Azerbaijan (and allies)	Armenia (and allies)	Results	Notes
Armenian-Tatar War (1905-1907)	1905	1906	Caucasian Tatar groups	Armenian groups: ARF members; Russian Empire	Russian victory	3000 to at least 10000 killed
Armenian–Azerbaijani War	1918	1920	(Azerbaijan Democratic Republic) Azerbaijan; Ottoman Empire; Republic of Aras (1918–1919)	(First Republic of Armenia) Armenia: Russian SFSR; (Azerbaijan Soviet Socialist Republic) Azerbaijani communists; (Armenian Soviet Socialist Republic) Armenian communists; (Ottoman Empire) Turkish revolutionaries (1920)	Inconclusive	Inconclusive: Soviet invasion of Armenia and Azerbaijan, and subsequent victory; Sovietization of Armenia and Azerbaijan; Disputes over Karabakh and Nakhchivan settled in favor of Soviet Azerbaijan; Most of Zangezur gained by Soviet Armenia
First Nagorno-Karabakh War	1988	1994	Azerbaijan (from 1991); Soviet Union (until 1991) (Note: Soviet authorities generally sided with Azerbaijan over Nagorno-Karabakh. Soviet troops were present in Nagorno-Karabakh for 2 1/2 years and supported Azerbaijani militias. Soviet troops directly intervened during Operation Ring in April–May 1991 on the Azerbaijani side.); Azerbaijan SSR; Foreign groups: Hezbe Wahdat; Hezb-e-Islami; Grey Wolves; Chechen volunteers; UNA-UNSO; Slavic mercenaries; Turkish volunteers	Nagorno-Karabakh (Note: Nagorno-Karabakh Autonomous Oblast (NKAO) until 1991.); Armenia (Note: Armenian Soviet Socialist Republic (Soviet Armenia) until 1990 (renamed Republic of Armenia)/1991 (declared independence).); Armenian Revolutionary Federation; Foreign groups: Kuban Cossacks; Ossetian volunteers; Slavic mercenaries	Armenian victory	Armenian victory: De facto independence of Nagorno-Karabakh Republic and de facto unification with Armenia; Armenian occupation of territories surrounding Nagorno-Karabakh
2008 Mardakert clashes	2008	2008	Azerbaijan	Artsakh	Both sides claim victory	Both sides claim victory: Azerbaijan removes its troops
2010 Nagorno-Karabakh clashes	2010	2010	Azerbaijan	Armenia	Azerbaijan victory	
2010 Mardakert clashes	2010	2010	Azerbaijan	Nagorno-Karabakh; Armenia	Inconclusive	
2012 Armenian–Azerbaijani border clashes	2012	2012	Azerbaijan	Armenia; Nagorno-Karabakh	Inconclusive	
2014 Armenian–Azerbaijani clashes	2014	2014	Azerbaijan	Armenia; Artsakh	Status quo ante bellum	
April War	2016	2016	Azerbaijan	Artsakh; Armenia	Inconclusive (see aftermath)	Inconclusive (see aftermath): Azerbaijan claims victory; Armenia claims to have successfully repelled the Azerbaijani offensive; The line of contact shifted for the first time since 1994; Azerbaijan captures a territory from 800 hectares (8.0 km^{2}) to 2,000 hectares (20 km^{2}), including 2 heights
Gyunnyut clashes	2018	2018	Azerbaijan	Armenia	Inconclusive: See Aftermath section	Inconclusive: See Aftermath section; Azerbaijan gains between 10 and 15 km^{2} of land.
July 2020 Armenian–Azerbaijani clashes	2020	2020	Azerbaijan	Armenia	Both sides claim victory	Both sides claim victory: 2020 Azerbaijani protests; No territorial changes
Second Nagorno-Karabakh War	2020	2020	Azerbaijan; Turkey (alleged by Armenia) (Syrian opposition) Syrian mercenaries (Note: Denied by Azerbaijan and Turkey.)	Artsakh; Armenia	Azerbaijani victory	Azerbaijani victory: Azerbaijan gains control of 72% of Republic of Artsakh territory
Armenia–Azerbaijan border crisis (2021–present)	2021	Ongoing	Azerbaijan	Armenia	Ongoing	Ongoing: Azerbaijan occupies parts of the Syunik and Gegharkunik provinces adjacent to the Armenia–Azerbaijan border: 215 square kilometers (83 square miles) of Armenian territory
September 2022 Armenia–Azerbaijan clashes	2022	2022	Azerbaijan	Armenia	Ceasefire	Ceasefire: Displacement of 7600 Armenian civilians; Occupation of Armenian territory; Per Armenia: Azerbaijan occupied 140 km^{2} of Armenian territory, advanced 7.5 km deep into Armenian territory towards Jermuk; Per Azerbaijan: Azerbaijan captures strategic heights along the border
2023 Azerbaijani offensive in Nagorno-Karabakh	2023	2023	Azerbaijan (Note: See § Foreign involvement for more details.)	Artsakh (Note: See § Foreign involvement for more details.)	Azerbaijani victory	Azerbaijani victory: Azerbaijan regains control of Nagorno-Karabakh; Azerbaijani occupation of parts of Syunik, Vayots Dzor and Gegharkunik regions of Armenia

== See also ==
- Anti-Armenian sentiment in Azerbaijan
- Anti-Azerbaijani sentiment in Armenia
- Armenia–Azerbaijan relations
