= Gegharkunik (village) =

Village in Gegharkunik, Armenia

Gegharkunik Գեղարքունիք
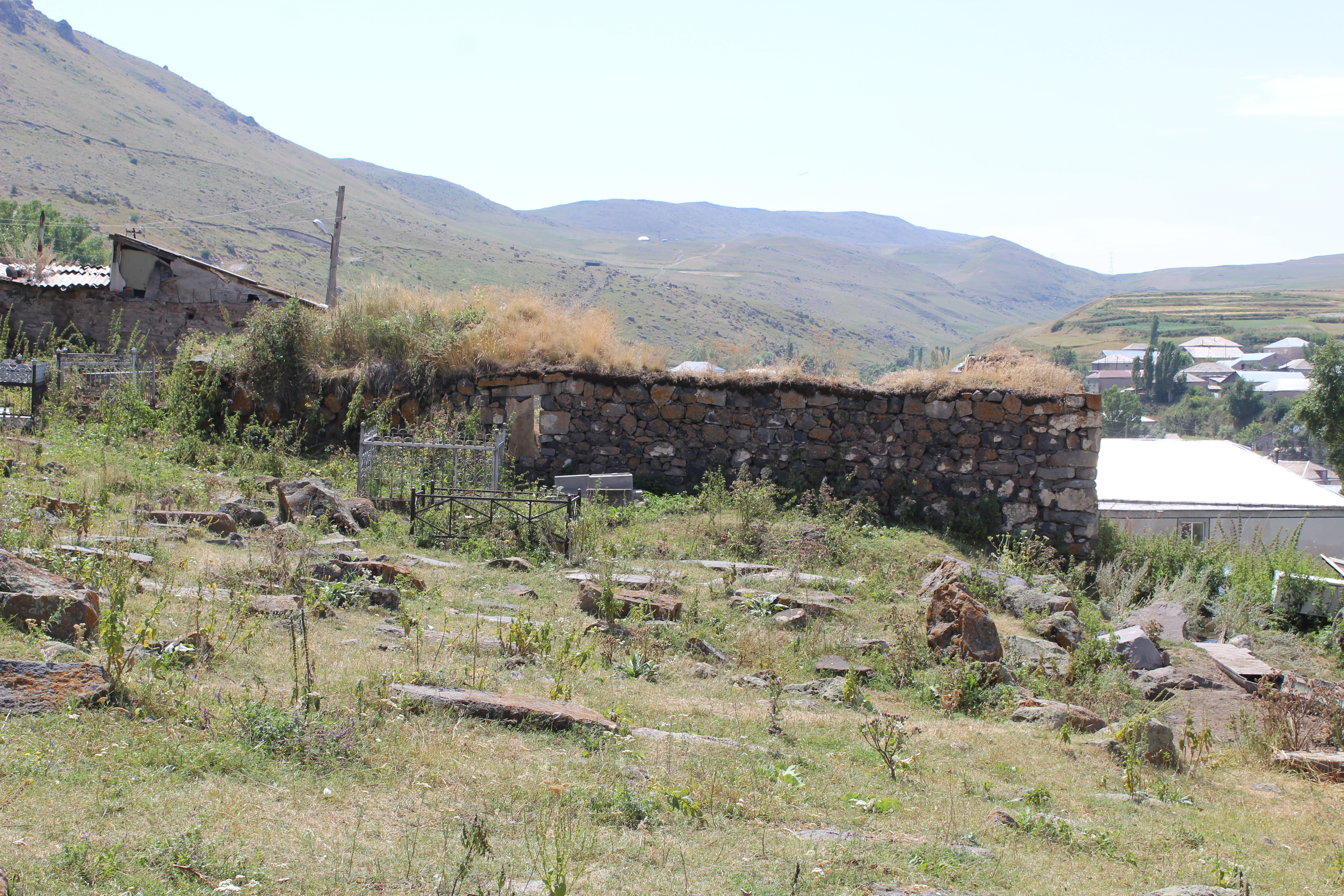
- Saint Gevorg Church in Gegharkunik

- Location within Armenia Location within Gegharkunik
- Coordinates: 40°15′04″N 45°08′53″E
- Country: Armenia
- Province: Gegharkunik
- Municipality: Gavar
- Founded: 1828
- Elevation: 2,096 m (6,877 ft)

Population (2011)
  - Total: 1,654
- Time zone: UTC+4 (AMT)
- Postal code: 1207

Gegharkunik (Armenian: Գեղարքունիք) is a village in Gavar Municipality, in the Gegharkunik Province of Armenia.

== Toponymy ==
The village was known as Bashkend until 1946.

== History ==
The village was founded in 1828 by emigrants primarily from Gavar. The village contains a small church, and St. Gevorg Church on a hill nearby.

== Gallery ==
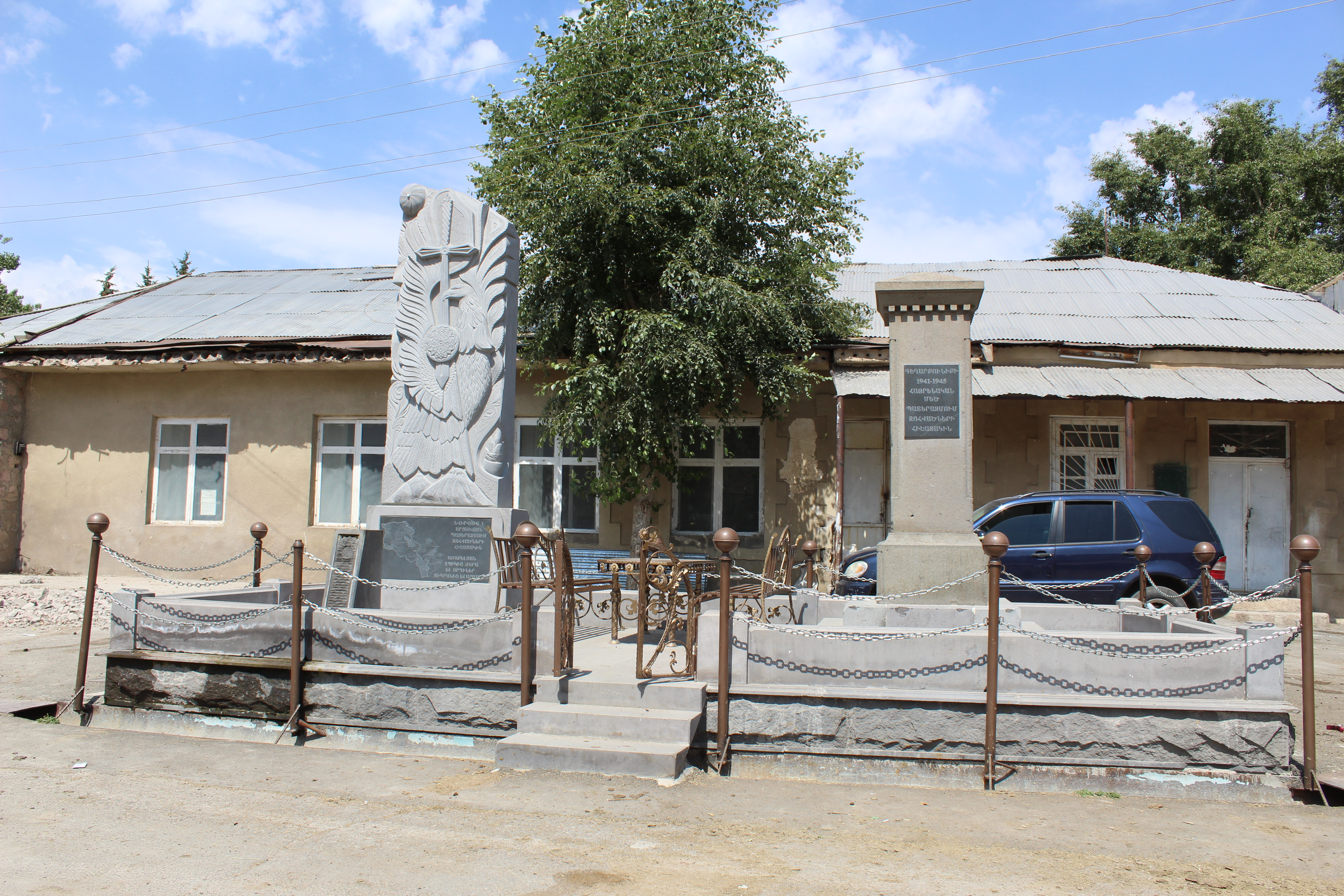
WWII monument

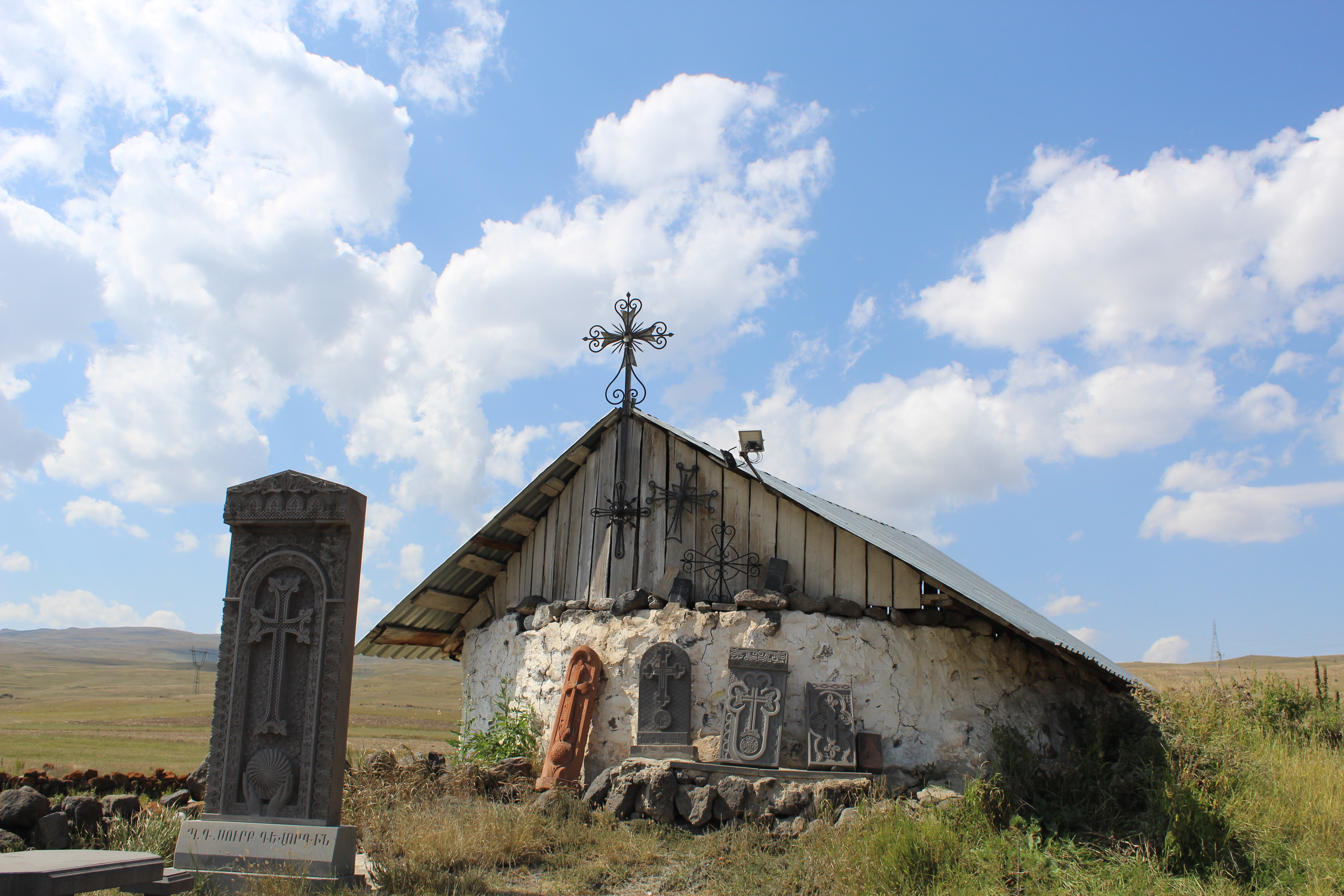
St. George Chapel

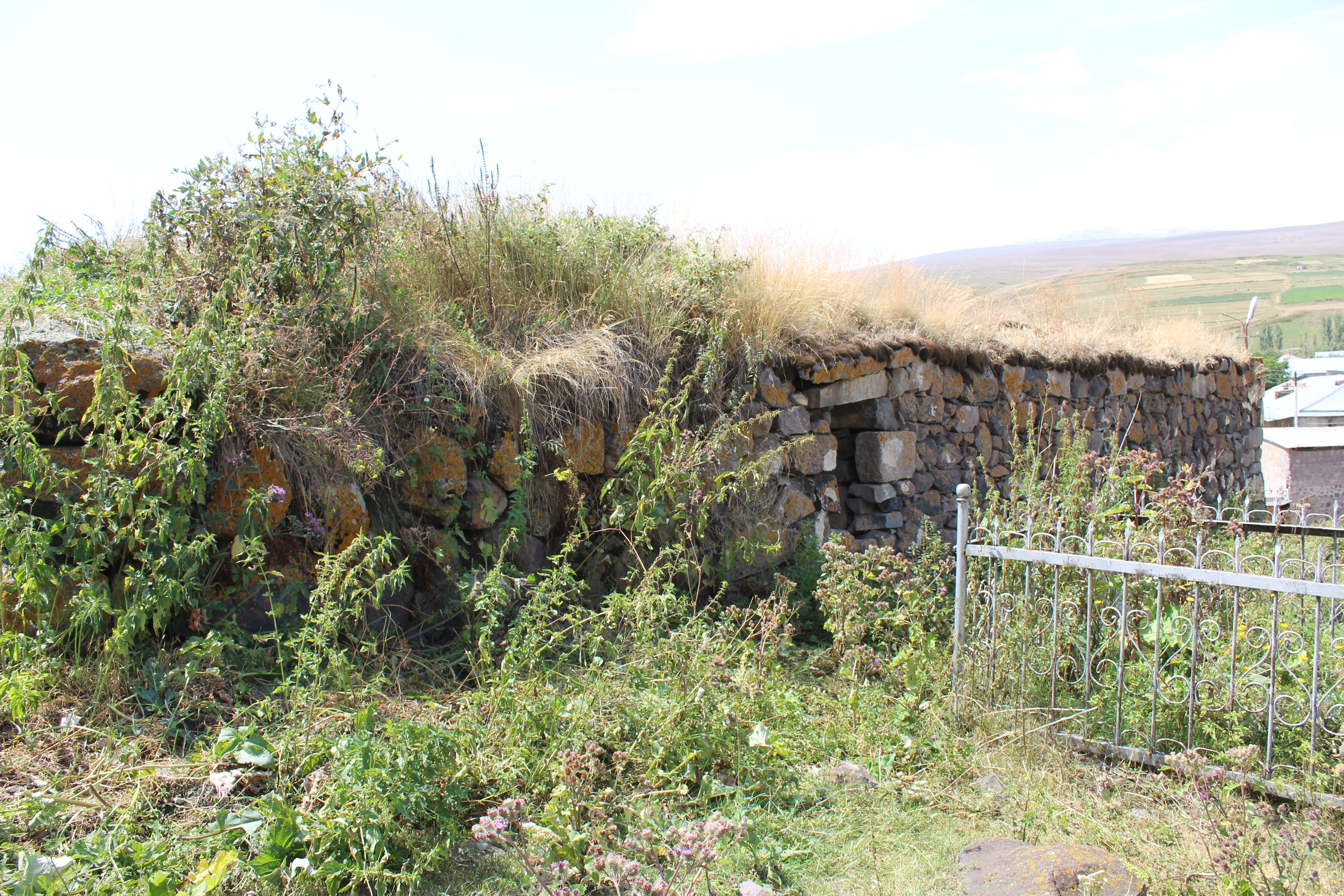
Saint Gevorg Church

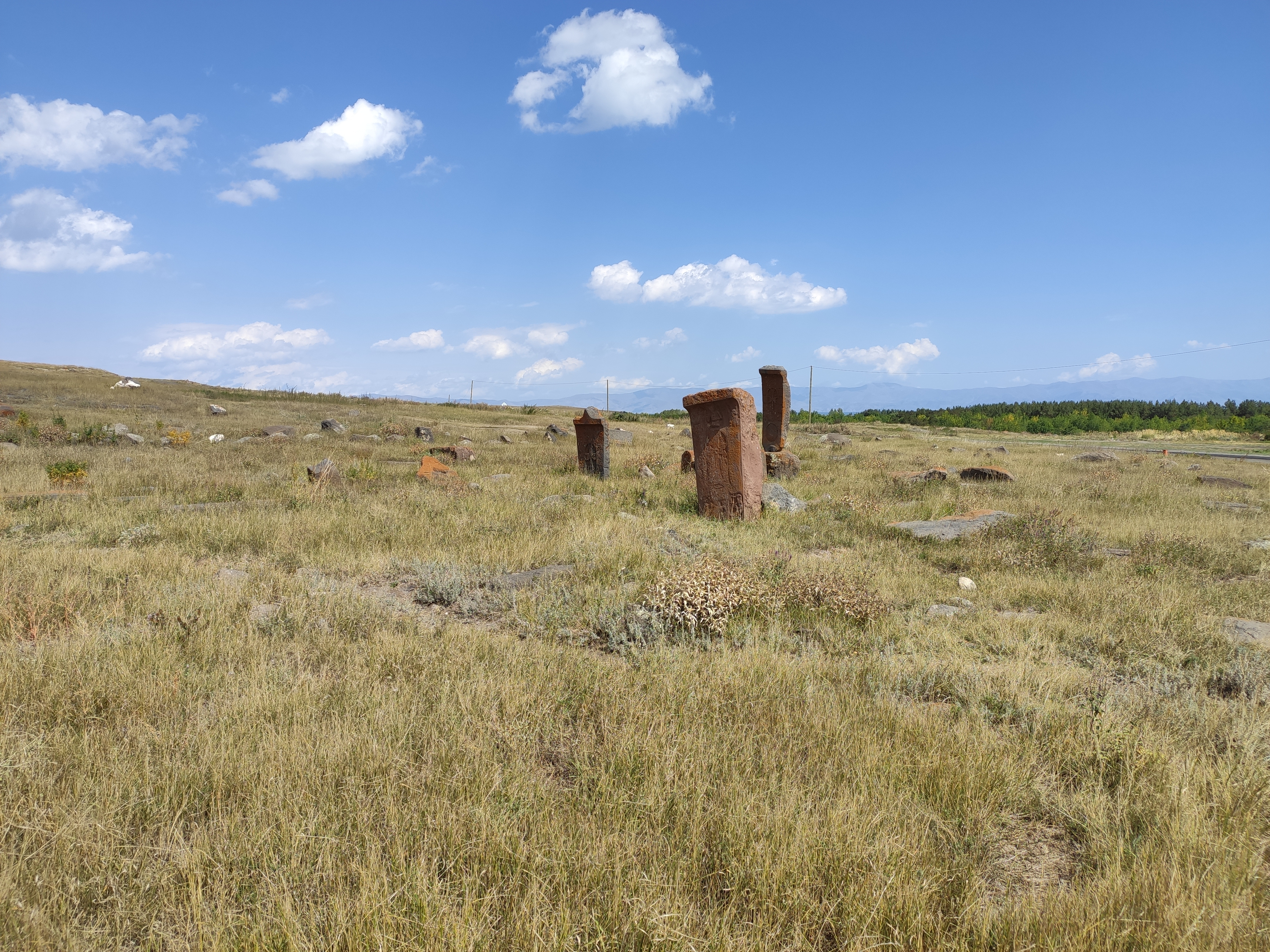
Khachkars around St. George Chapel
