= Abulfas Garayev =

Azerbaijani politician (born 1956)

- Əbülfəs Qarayev
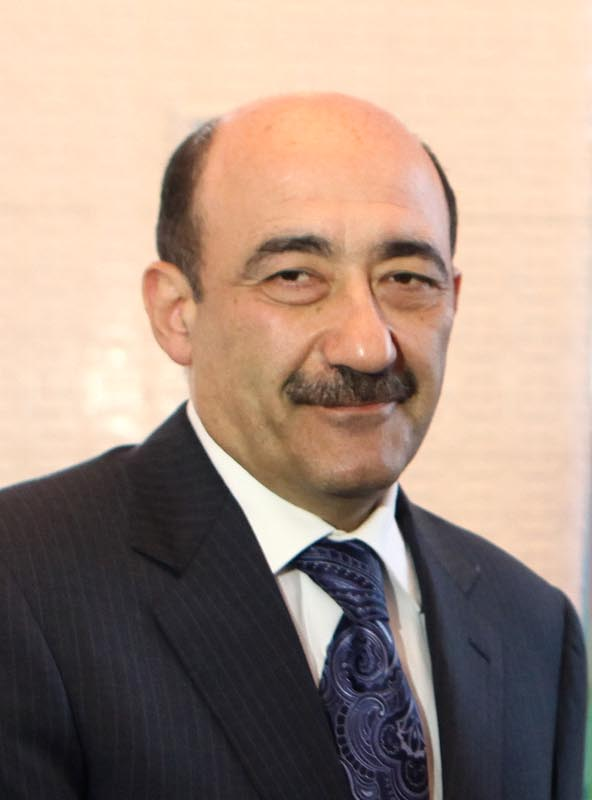

Minister of Culture
- In office 23 April 2018 – 21 May 2020
- President: Ilham Aliyev
- Preceded by: Position established
- Succeeded by: Anar Karimov

Minister of Culture and Tourism
- In office 30 January 2006 – 20 April 2018
- President: Ilham Aliyev

Minister of Youth, Sports and Tourism
- In office 18 April 2001 – 30 January 2006
- President: Haydar Aliyev; Ilham Aliyev

Minister of Youth and Sports
- In office 26 July 1994 – 18 April 2001
- President: Haydar Aliyev

Personal details
- Born: 13 November 1956 (age 69) Baku, Azerbaijan SSR, Soviet Union (now Baku, Azerbaijan)
- Parent: Mursal Garayev (father)
- Awards

Abulfas Mursal oglu Garayev (Azerbaijani: Əbülfəs Mürsəl oğlu Qarayev; born 13 November 1956) is an Azerbaijani politician, who served as the Minister of Culture of Azerbaijan.

== Early life and educational background ==
Garayev was born on November 13, 1956, in Baku, Azerbaijan. He graduated from the Azerbaijan University of Languages in 1978. From 1978 until 1980, he worked as a teacher of English in a secondary school in Saatly Rayon. In 1980-1989, he held various positions within the Azerbaijan Communist Party. In 1992, he completed a course at the North-West Academy of Public Administration in Russia. In 1992-1993, Garayev worked as a professor at the Azerbaijani Academy of Public Administration. He also attended specialized courses on Management and Marketing in the Russian State Administration Academy in 1992. In 1993-1994, he held several managerial positions at Improtex Commerce. Garayev is also actively involved in scientific work and pedagogical activities; he is author of several books and is an Associate Professor of Azerbaijan Tourism Institute since 2006. Fluent in Azerbaijani, Russian, English, Turkish, and French.

== Political career ==
Dr. Abulfas Garayev held the position of Minister of Culture from 2018 to 2020, Minister of Culture and Tourism from 2006 to 2018, Minister of Youth, Sport and Tourism from 2001 to 2006, Minister of Youth and Sport from 1994-2001.

Prior to his appointments, he was CEO of “Improtex Commerce” company (1992-1994), worked as a lecturer at the Academy of Political Science and State Administration from 1992 till 1993. Garayev began his career as an instructor of Organizational Department of Youth League, held several managing portfolios within the organization, from 1981-1985 served as a head of section in Youth League Steering Committee.

Garayev received his PhD in philosophy and culture from the Academy of Social Sciences, Moscow-Russia (1992) and degree from University of Foreign Languages and Pedagogy, Baku, Azerbaijan in 1978. He worked as chair of the Organizing Committee of the World Forum on Intercultural Dialogue held this position Baku starting from 2011 in partnership with UNESCO, UN Alliance of Civilizations, UNWTO, Council of Europe and ISESCO and co-chairman of the Intergovernmental Commission on cooperation between Azerbaijan and Cuba from 2009. During his term as minister of Culture and Tourism, he was the chair of the 6th Islamic Conference of Culture Ministers (2009–2011), headed OIC Tourism Ministers Conference (2006–2008), TURKSOY Permanent Council of Culture Ministers (2009), UNESCO Intergovernmental Committee for intangible Cultural Heritage (2013) and CIS Council on Cultural Cooperation. Dr. Garayev was appointed chair of National Organizing Committee of the United Nations Alliance of Civilizations 7th Global Forum held 25–27 April 2016 in Baku. He also worked as the President of the ISESCO General Conference for 2015–2018 years as well as chair of the National Commission for ISESCO. He was a member of UNWTO Executive Council and vice-chair of the National Commission of Azerbaijan for UNESCO. Garayev has received Honorary Degree of Doctor of Arts (Hon Darts) from the Coventry University in UK in recognition of his support to the Baku Process for intercultural dialogue.

== Personal life ==
Abulfas Garayev is married and has a daughter.
