= Anar Karimov =

Azerbaijani politician (born 1977)

Anar Karimov Anar Kərimov

Minister of Culture
- In office 5 January 2021 – 22 December 2022 (Acting: 20 July 2020 – 5 January 2021)
- President: Ilham Aliyev
- Preceded by: Abulfas Garayev
- Succeeded by: Adil Karimli

First Deputy Minister of Culture
- In office 20 July 2020 – 5 January 2021
- President: Ilham Aliyev

Permanent Delegate of Azerbaijan to UNESCO
- In office 23 May 2014 – 20 July 2020

Personal details
- Born: 3 June 1977 (age 48) Fuzuli District, Azerbaijan SSR, USSR
- Education: Baku State University (1998); Academy of Public Administration (2003)
- Awards

Anar Gabil oghlu Karimov (Azerbaijani: Anar Qabil oğlu Kərimov, 3 June 1977) is an Azerbaijani politician who served as Minister of Culture of the Republic of Azerbaijan from 2021 to 2022.

== Biography ==
Anar Karimov was born on June 3, 1977, in Fuzuli District. In 1998, he received his bachelor's degree in the Arabic language and philology from the Faculty of Oriental Studies of Baku State University, and in 2003 he received his master's degree in international relations and diplomacy from the Academy of Public Administration under the President of the Republic of Azerbaijan.

He speaks Arabic, Russian, English and French. He is married and has three children.

== Political career ==
Anar Karimov began his diplomatic career in 2000 as attaché and third secretary in the Department of Human Rights, Democratization and Humanitarian Affairs of the Ministry of Foreign Affairs of the Republic of Azerbaijan. From 2004 to 2008 he worked as the third and second secretary of the Embassy of the Republic of Azerbaijan in the Kingdom of Belgium and the Representation to the European Union. From 2008 to 2009, he served as First Secretary of the Department of Humanitarian and Social Issues of the Ministry of Foreign Affairs of the Republic of Azerbaijan. In 2010–2014, he worked as consultant and chargé d'Affaires to the Permanent Representation of the Republic of Azerbaijan to UNESCO.

On May 23, 2014, by orders of the President of the Republic of Azerbaijan, Anar Karimov was awarded the diplomatic rank of Envoy Extraordinary and Plenipotentiary, and he was appointed Permanent Delegate of the Republic of Azerbaijan to UNESCO.

On July 9, 2019, Anar Karimov was awarded the diplomatic rank of Ambassador Extraordinary and Plenipotentiary. On July 20, 2020, by orders of the President of the Republic of Azerbaijan, Anar Karimov was appointed First Deputy and Acting Minister of Culture of Azerbaijan. On January 5, 2021, he was appointed Minister of Culture of Azerbaijan. He was discharged from the position on December 22, 2022.

== Awards ==
- 3rd degree "For service to the Fatherland" Order — 1 August 2019
