= Azerbaijan State Children Philharmonic Hall =

Azerbaijan State Children Philharmonic Hall Azərbaycan Dövlət Uşaq Filarmoniyası
- Interactive map of Azerbaijan State Children Philharmonic Hall; Azərbaycan Dövlət Uşaq Filarmoniyası
- Address: Yasamal raion, Basti Baghirova st. 16, AZ1065; Baku; Azerbaijan
- Coordinates: 40°23′03″N 49°49′34″E

Construction
- Opened: 2 September 1991
- Renovated: 2018–2019

Website
- www.aduf.az

Azerbaijan State Children Philharmonic Hall (Azerbaijani: Azərbaycan Dövlət Uşaq Filarmoniyası) is a Philharmonic Hall operating in Baku. It is an educational and amateur center for children in various fields of art. The Hall is subordinated to the Ministry of Culture of the Azerbaijan Republic.

== About ==
Azerbaijan State Children Philharmonic Hall was established by the decision of the Cabinet of Ministers of Azerbaijan No. 291 dated September 2, 1991, and was formalized by the order No. 361 of the Ministry of Culture of the Azerbaijan Republic dated October 18, 1991.

The Philharmonic Hall has two main orchestras - the Children Symphony Orchestra and the Children Folk Instruments Orchestra, a dance troupe formed in 1991, a children's theater studio operating since 2013, the children's choir and chamber ensemble "Shams" since 2012, the ensemble of wind instruments, the art circle and other groups.

During the year, more than 500 children between the ages of 4 and 18 study and work in various fields of art at the Hall. Those who distinguished themselves performed in concert halls around the world and won prizes at international festivals and competitions.

The building of the Hall was overhauled in 2018–2019, and was opened on May 21, 2019.

Dilara Aliyeva, Honored Art Worker of the Republic of Azerbaijan, has been the director of the Azerbaijan State Children Philharmonic Hall since 2012.
