= September 2022 Armenia–Azerbaijan clashes =

Major escalation of the 2021–2022 Armenia-Azerbaijan border crisis

September 2022 Azerbaijani attack on Armenia
- Part of the Armenia–Azerbaijan border crisis
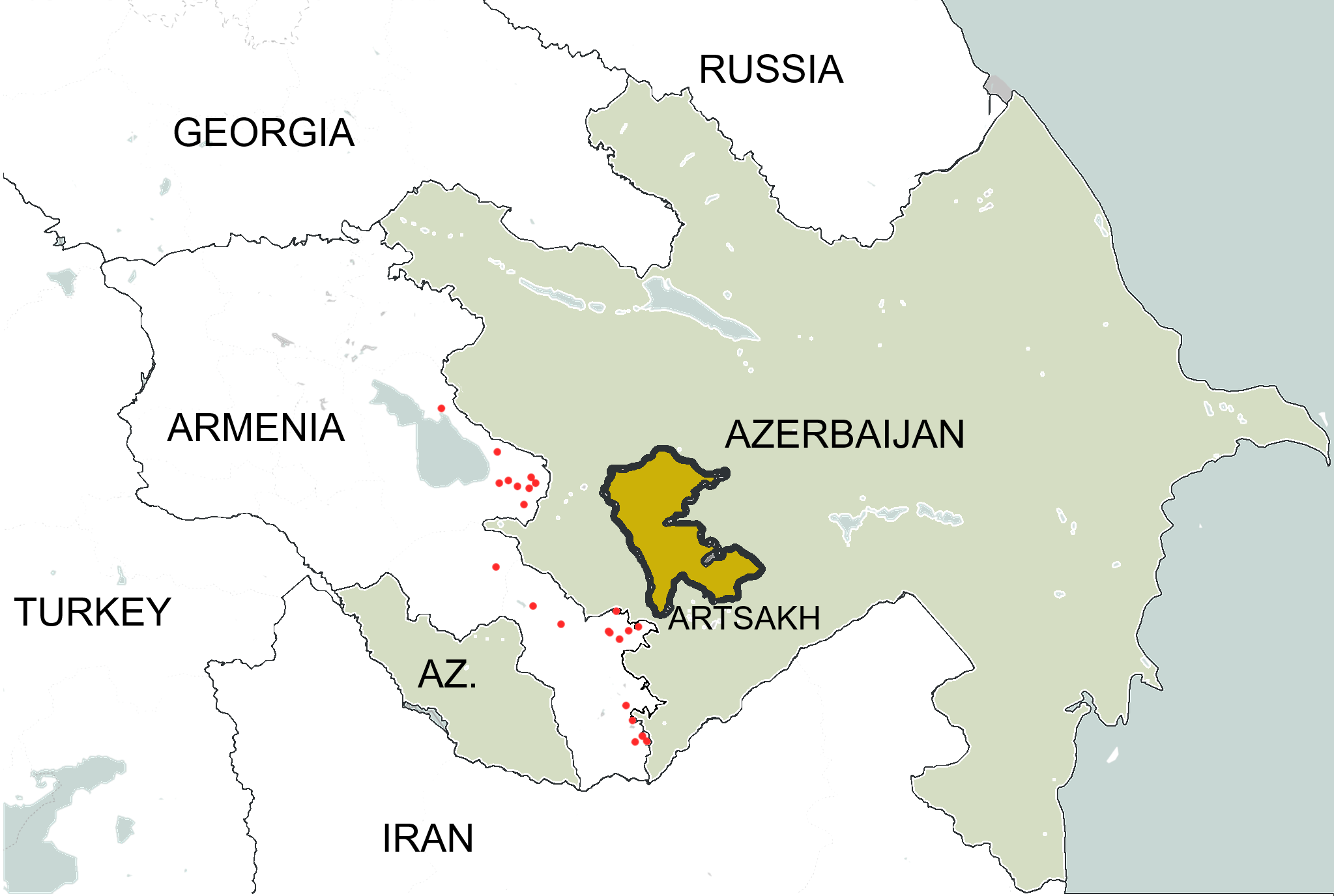
- A map of Azerbaijani strikes on the territory of Armenia since 12 September 2022. At least 23 localities were hit.
Date	12–14 September 2022 (2 days)
Location	Armenia–Azerbaijan border
Result	Ceasefire; Displacement of 7,600 Armenian civilians; Occupation of Armenian territory
Territorial changes	Azerbaijan occupies 200 km^{2} of Armenian territory

Belligerents
Azerbaijan; Supported by: Turkey	Armenia

Commanders and leaders
(Azerbaijan) Ilham Aliyev; (Azerbaijan) Zakir Hasanov	(Armenia) Nikol Pashinyan; (Armenia) Suren Papikyan; (Armenia) Edvard Asryan

Units involved
Azerbaijani Armed Forces	Armed Forces of Armenia

Casualties and losses
Per Azerbaijan: 80 servicemen killed; 281 servicemen wounded; Armenian claim: 431 servicemen killed	Per Armenia: 202 servicemen killed or missing; 293 servicemen wounded; 20 servicemen captured; Azerbaijani claim: 450 servicemen killed; 2 S-300 launchers destroyed
- 4 Armenian civilians killed and 2 missing; 7 Armenian and 3 Azerbaijani civilians injured

On 12 September 2022, a series of clashes erupted between Armenian and Azerbaijani troops along the Armenia–Azerbaijan border, marking a major escalation in the current border crisis between Armenia–Azerbaijan and resulting in nearly 300 deaths and dozens of injuries on both sides by 14 September. The event represents the largest attack by Azerbaijan on Armenia in the history of their conflict and triggered an emergency meeting the UN Security Council. A number of news outlets, human rights organizations and governments – including the United States, European Parliament, Canada, France, Uruguay, Cyprus – stated that Azerbaijan had launched an attack on positions inside the Republic of Armenia. This incursion resulted in Azerbaijan occupying over 200 square kilometers of Armenian sovereign land.

Azerbaijani forces attacked military and civilian positions in Vardenis, Goris, Sotk, Jermuk, and other cities with artillery, drones, and heavy weapons. Azerbaijan claimed that Armenian forces had staged "large-scale subversive acts" using "saboteurs" who planted landmines, an allegation the government spread during the days following the invasion and also echoed by Azerbaijan's ally Turkey. Various journalists, politicians, and political analysts scrutinized these allegations and considered them unfounded or unverifiable.

The fighting ended with Azerbaijani troops taking control of strategic positions deep inside Armenia, with at least 7,600 civilians displaced from Armenian provinces. Russia said on 13 September that it had brokered a ceasefire, but both sides confirmed it was broken minutes after coming into effect. On 14 September, Armenia and Azerbaijan brokered a new ceasefire. Armenia requested that the CSTO provide military support; however, the military alliance refused to provide support. The clashes erupted shortly after Russia suffered serious setbacks in the Kharkiv counteroffensive during the invasion of Ukraine, weakening its force projection in the Caucasus.

Following a meeting between the leaders of Azerbaijan and Armenia at the 1st European Political Community Summit at the invitation of the President of France and the President of the European Council, an EU civilian monitoring mission consisting of 40 people was deployed on the Armenian side of the border (Azerbaijan did not grant access to its side), and an OSCE assessment mission will be sent to Armenia.

== Background ==
On 12 May 2021, Azerbaijani soldiers crossed several kilometers into Armenia in the provinces of Syunik and Gegharkunik and occupied about 41 square kilometres (16 sq mi) of Armenian territory. The European Parliament, as well as the United States and France – two of the three co-chairs of the OSCE Minsk Group – called on Azerbaijan to withdraw its troops from internationally recognised Armenian territory.

Further clashes took place in July 2021 and in November 2021, with casualties being reported from both sides. In a joint statement on 17 November 2021, EU rapporteurs called the military operation launched by Azerbaijan on 16 November 2021 the worst violation to date of the 2020 Nagorno-Karabakh ceasefire agreement.

Turkey and Azerbaijan carried out joint military exercises in the days before the September 2022 attacks on Armenia. In the days and hours up running up until September 13, Armenian officials warned that they feared an attack.

== Timeline ==
=== 12–13 September ===
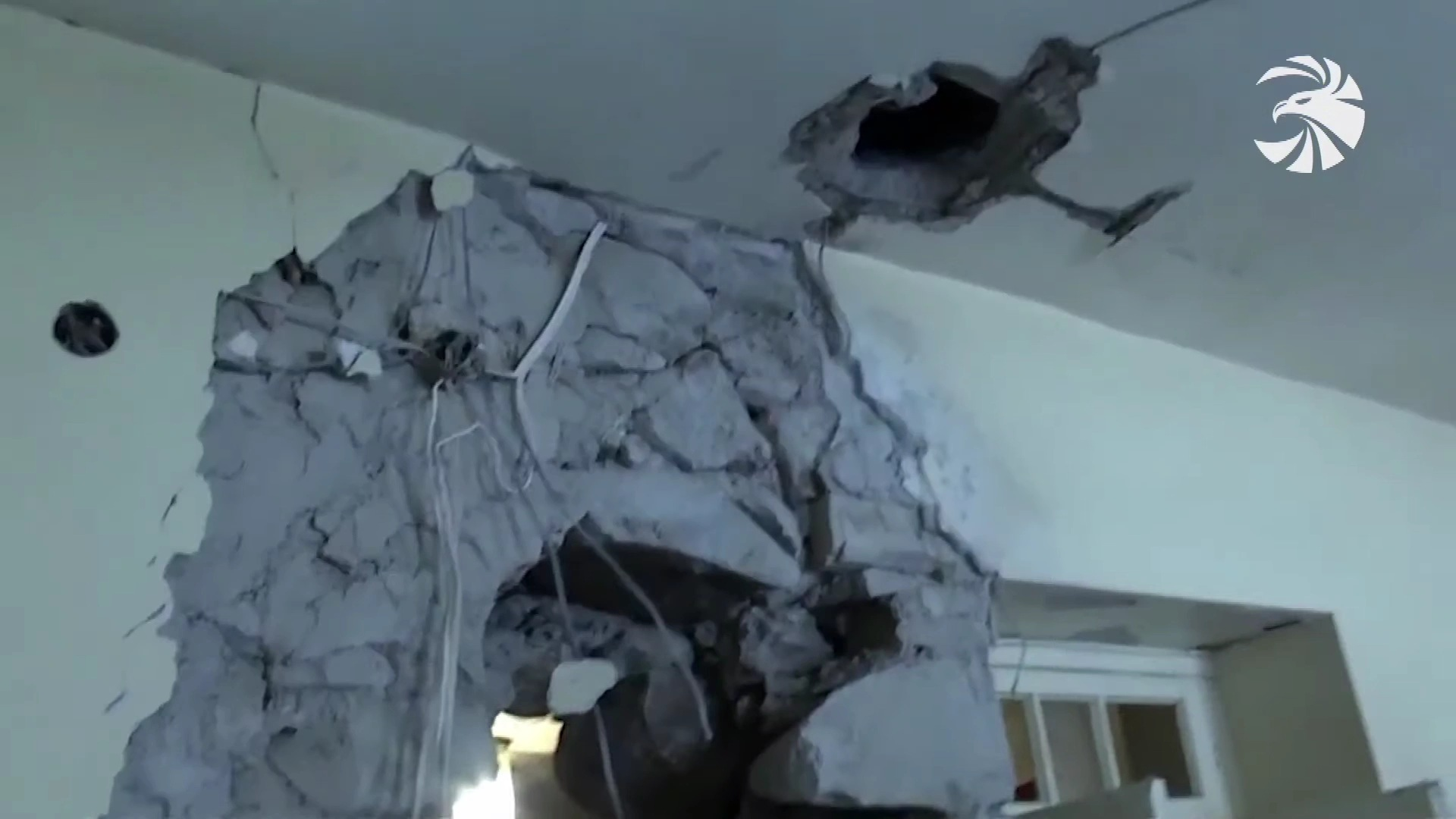
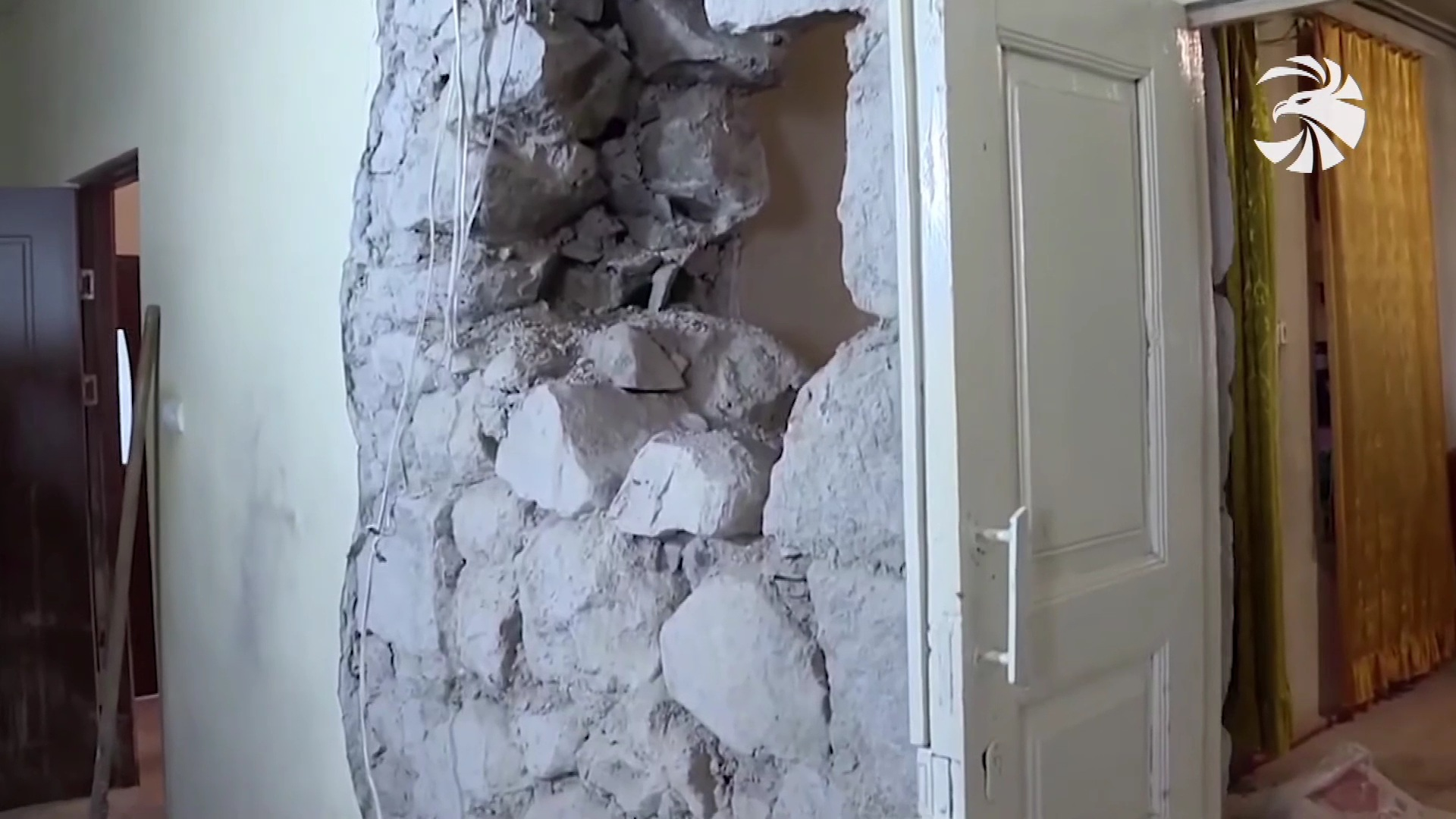
A residential house in Jermuk (Vayots Dzor Province, Armenia) following Azerbaijani Armed Forces' attack on the town

On the morning of 12 September 2022, Azerbaijan initiated an unprovoked invasion of Armenia, striking positions along a 200 km stretch of their shared border.

On the evening of 12 September, the Armenian Ministry of Defense reported that units of the Azerbaijani Armed Forces had started firing intensively with artillery and heavy weapons in the direction of Armenian positions and civilian areas in Goris, Artanish, Sotk, Jermuk, Kapan, and Ishkhanasar. The Armenian MoD also mentioned that the Azerbaijani side had used UAVs, and was undertaking positional advancement operations in some directions. The Azerbaijani Defence Ministry said that Armenia had staged "large-scale provocations" near the Dashkasan, Kalbajar, and Lachin regions and had laid mines along the army's supply roads. The Azerbaijani MoD reported that they were taking measures to "suppress the firing points of the Armenian armed forces and to prevent the expansion of the scale of the confrontation". At a meeting with foreign military attaches it was also stated that Armenian side had been mining supply roads of Azerbaijani army – according to Azerbaijani MoD, in the areas reclaimed by Azerbaijan 7,559 anti-personnel mines, 2,348 anti-tank mines and 10,052 unexploded ordnance were discovered by 13 September 2022.

Russia announced on 13 September that it had brokered a ceasefire, but both sides confirmed that it was broken minutes after coming into effect.

On 13 September at 14:00, the Armenian MoD announced that the situation in some parts of the Armenian-Azerbaijani border continues to be extremely tense as Azerbaijan continues to attempt positional advances, particularly in the direction of Nerkin Hand, Verin Shorzha, Artanish and Sotk. The Armenian MFA also stated that as a result of Azerbaijani shelling, many residential houses were damaged in the village of Kut, while women and children were evacuated. Armenia's Health Ministry stated that three civilians had been injured as a result of Azerbaijani shelling on civilian areas on the first day of the attack. According to Armenian prime minister Nikol Pashinyan, at least 204 Armenian servicemen were killed or missing. The Azerbaijani MoD announced the death of 80 of its servicemen, 42 of whom were members of the Azerbaijani Army while 8 were from the State Border Service.

=== 14–16 September ===
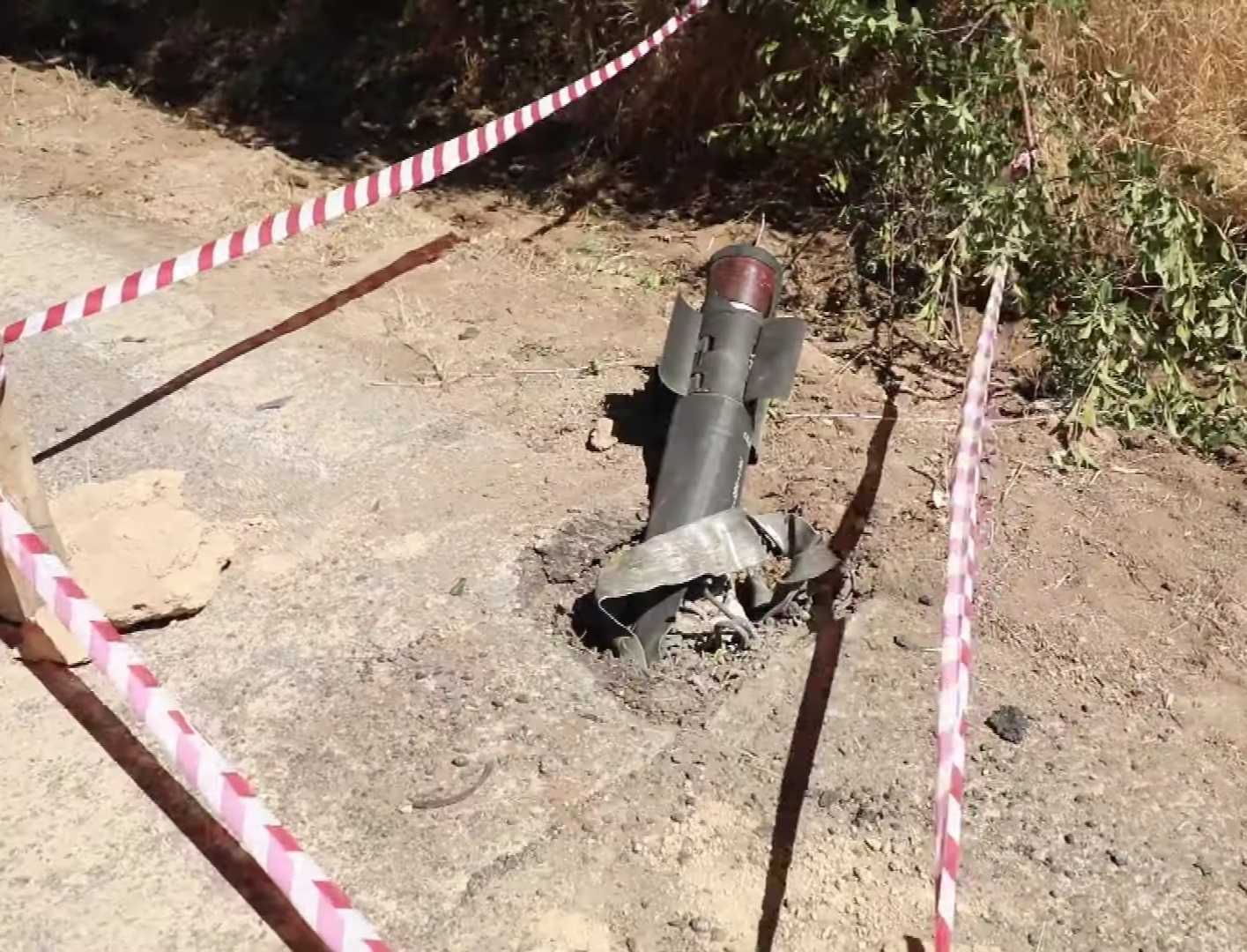
A fired missile in Sotk; a village in Armenia's Gegharkunik Province, that has been described as a ghost town after the entire population fled their homes due to shelling and infrastructural damage caused by Azerbaijan

In the morning of 14 September, the Azerbaijani MoD reported that the Armenian Armed Forces had fired mortars and artillery at Azerbaijani army units stationed in the Kelbajar and Lachin directions during the night and that the army was taking "adequate retaliatory measures". The Armenian MoD called this "another disinformation" which "serves as an information base for carrying out military aggression against the sovereign territory of the Republic of Armenia". Armenian MoD also reported that Azerbaijan was shelling Jermuk and Verin Shorzha, using artillery, mortars and large-caliber small arms. At 11 am, the Azerbaijani Ministry of Defense and the Prosecutor General's Office issued a joint statement claiming that two Azerbaijani civilians had been injured as a result of the Armenian Armed Forces' shelling.

Nikol Pashinyan said that Azerbaijan had taken control over certain areas of Armenian territory. Pashinyan added that Armenia had applied to Article 4 of the Collective Security Treaty Organization (CSTO) for the first time in Armenian history.

On that same day, an Armenian security official said that they agreed to a ceasefire between Armenia and Azerbaijan.

According to The Moscow Times, Putin rejected Armenian PM Pashinyan's request for military assistance: Armenia is a party to the Russian-led Collective Security Treaty Organization, the members of which have taken the obligation to assist each other in case of military aggression.

According to an Armenian MP, Armenia has regained control over six previously lost positions on the border.

=== 21–29 September ===
On 21 September the Armenian MoD reported that the Azerbaijani Armed Forces had fired mortars and large-caliber firearms at Armenian positions in eastern part of border and as a result wounded one Armenian soldier.

On 22 September the Armenian side reported that one of the civilians wounded during the first days of the attacks, had died in the hospital, thus raising the number of civilian casualties to 4.

Several foreign representations, among others the US embassy, the Dutch embassy, the French embassy, issued high risk security alerts, prohibiting any non-essential travel to several regions of Armenia bordering with Azerbaijan (Tavush, Gegharkunik, Vayots Dzor, Syunik regions and the village of Yeraskh). In response to a reporter's question, the US Embassy reiterated its calls on Azerbaijan "to return troops to their initial positions" and to maintain the ceasefire.

On 23 September Armenia MoD reported a ceasefire violation, whereby Azerbaijani armed forces had attempted to infiltrate into the rear of one of the Armenian combat positions located in the eastern direction of the Armenian border without success.

On 29 September Armenia MoD reported that Azerbaijani forces used mortars and weapons of large caliber, shelling the eastern part of the Armenian-Azerbaijani border, as a result 3 Armenian soldiers died. The MFA of Armenia stated that this shows Azerbaijan's "clear disrespect towards the calls of the international community and the member states of the UN Security Council to maintain the ceasefire" and the Prime Minister of Armenia called for "deployment of an international observer mission on the Armenia-Azerbaijan border".

== Shelling of Russian military ==
On the night of September 12–13, the Azerbaijani armed forces attacked the deployment point of the border forces of the FSB of Russia in Gegharkunik in Armenia. The personnel of the Russian troops urgently left the place of deployment. Based on the published photos, as a result of the shelling, the barracks and military equipment of the Russian troops were damaged

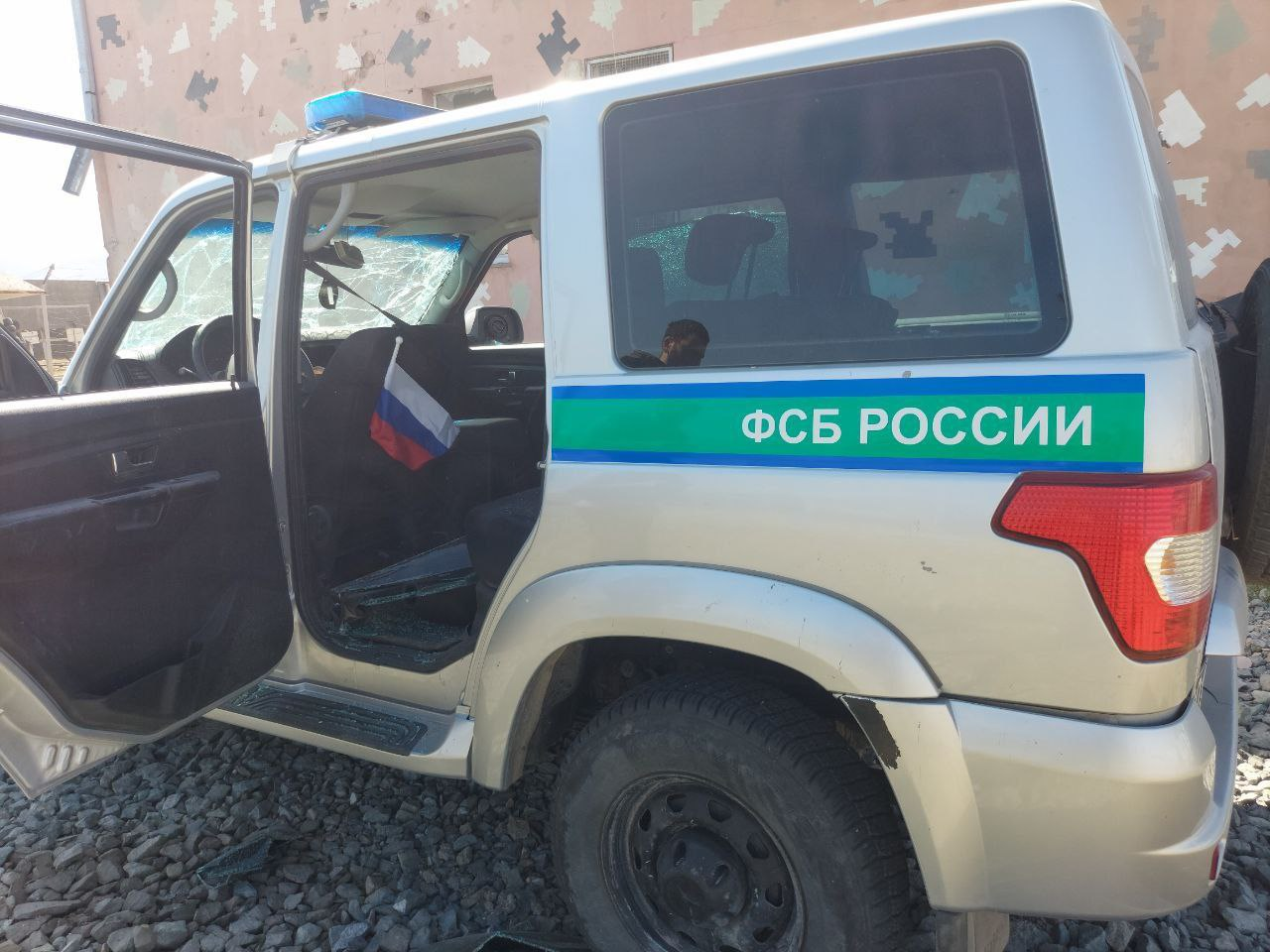

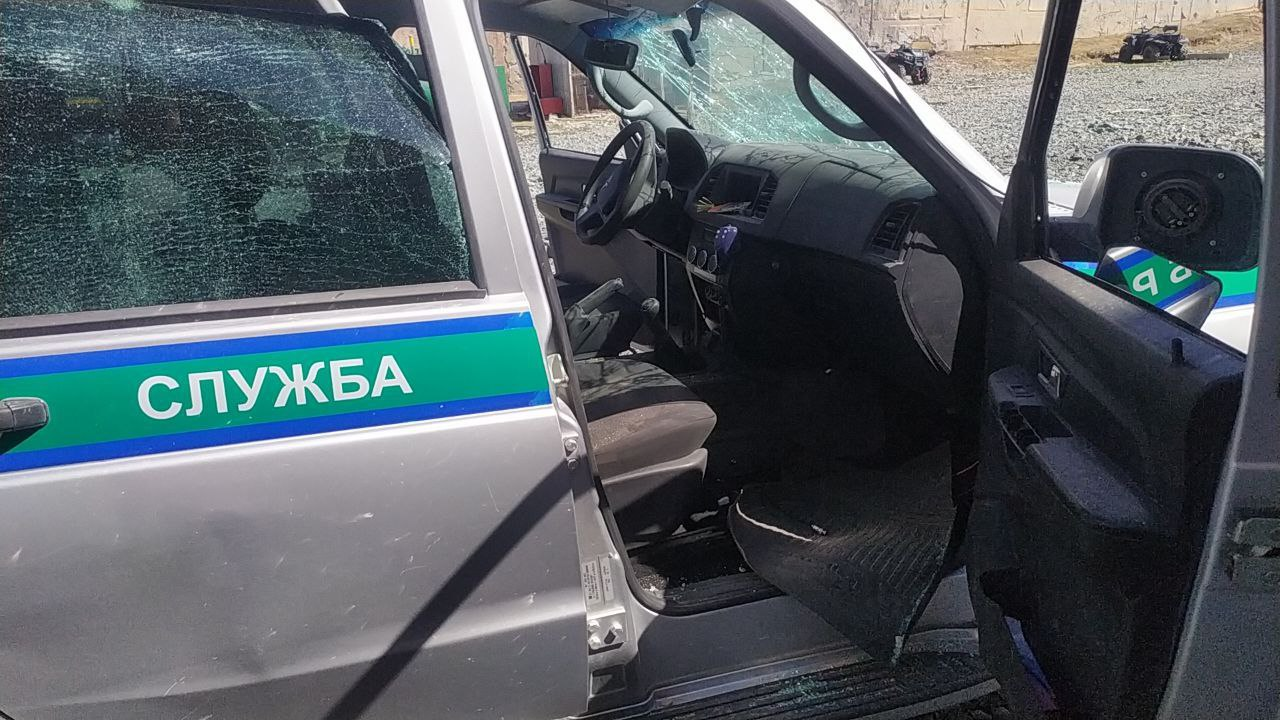

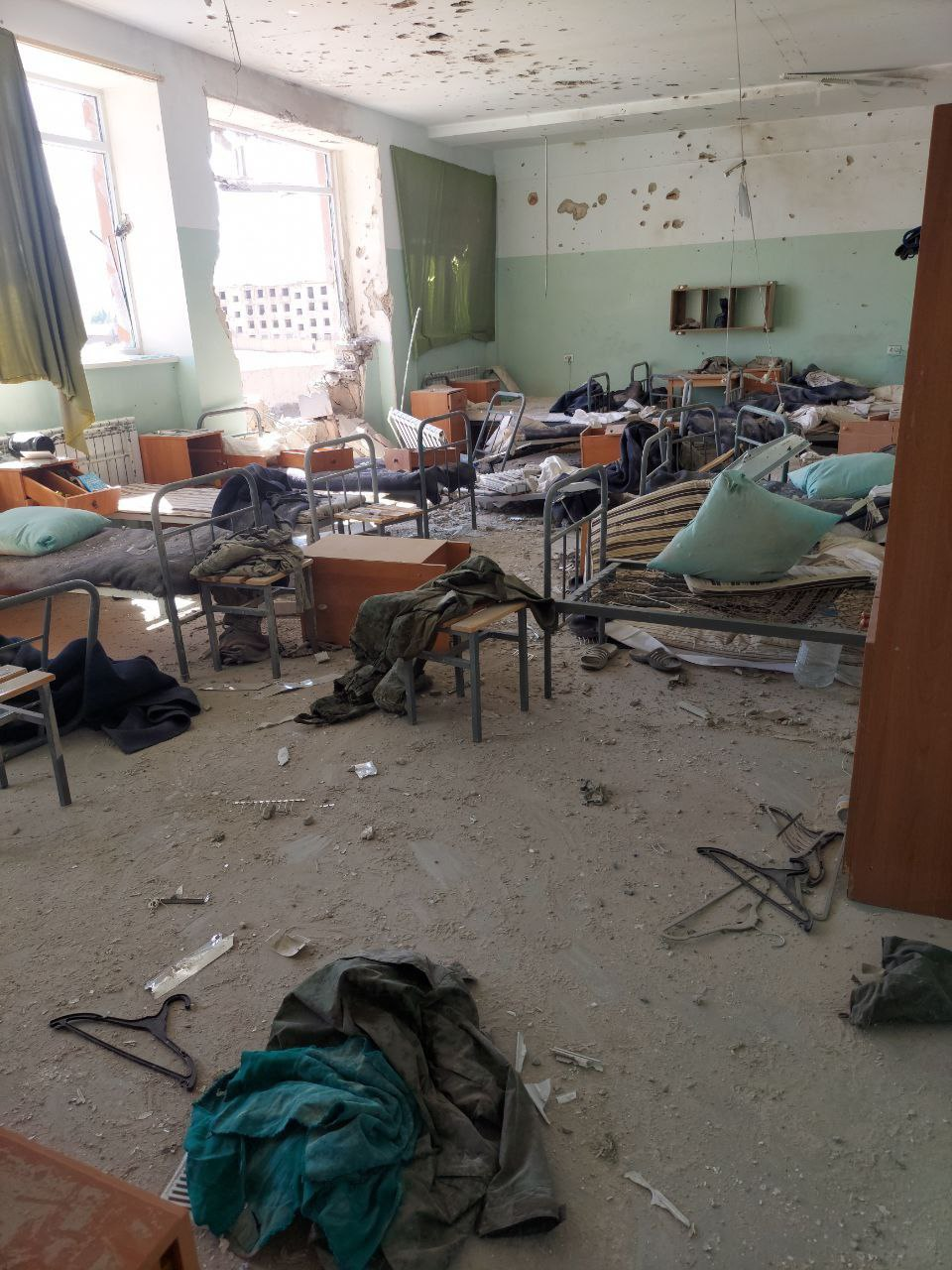

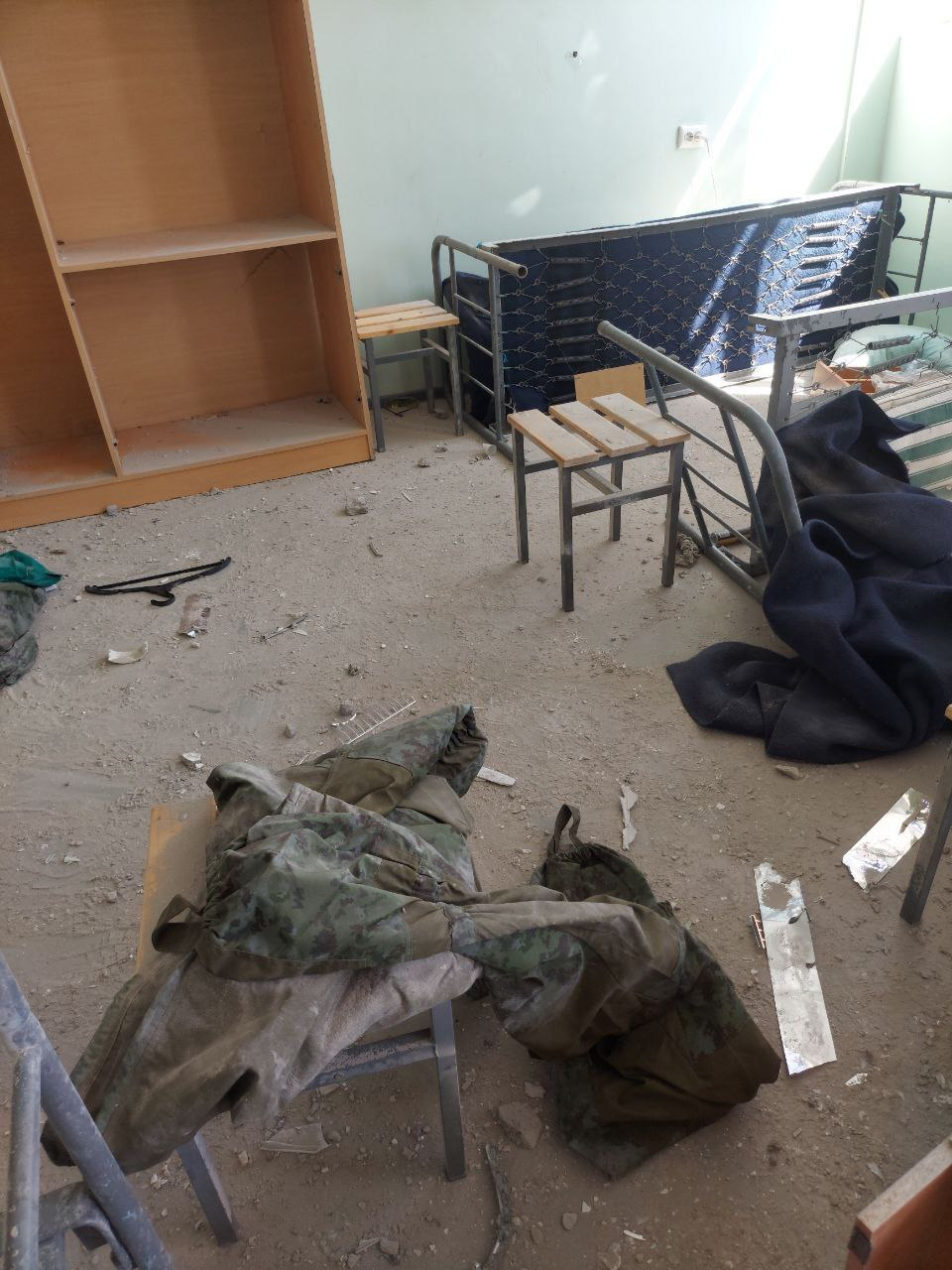

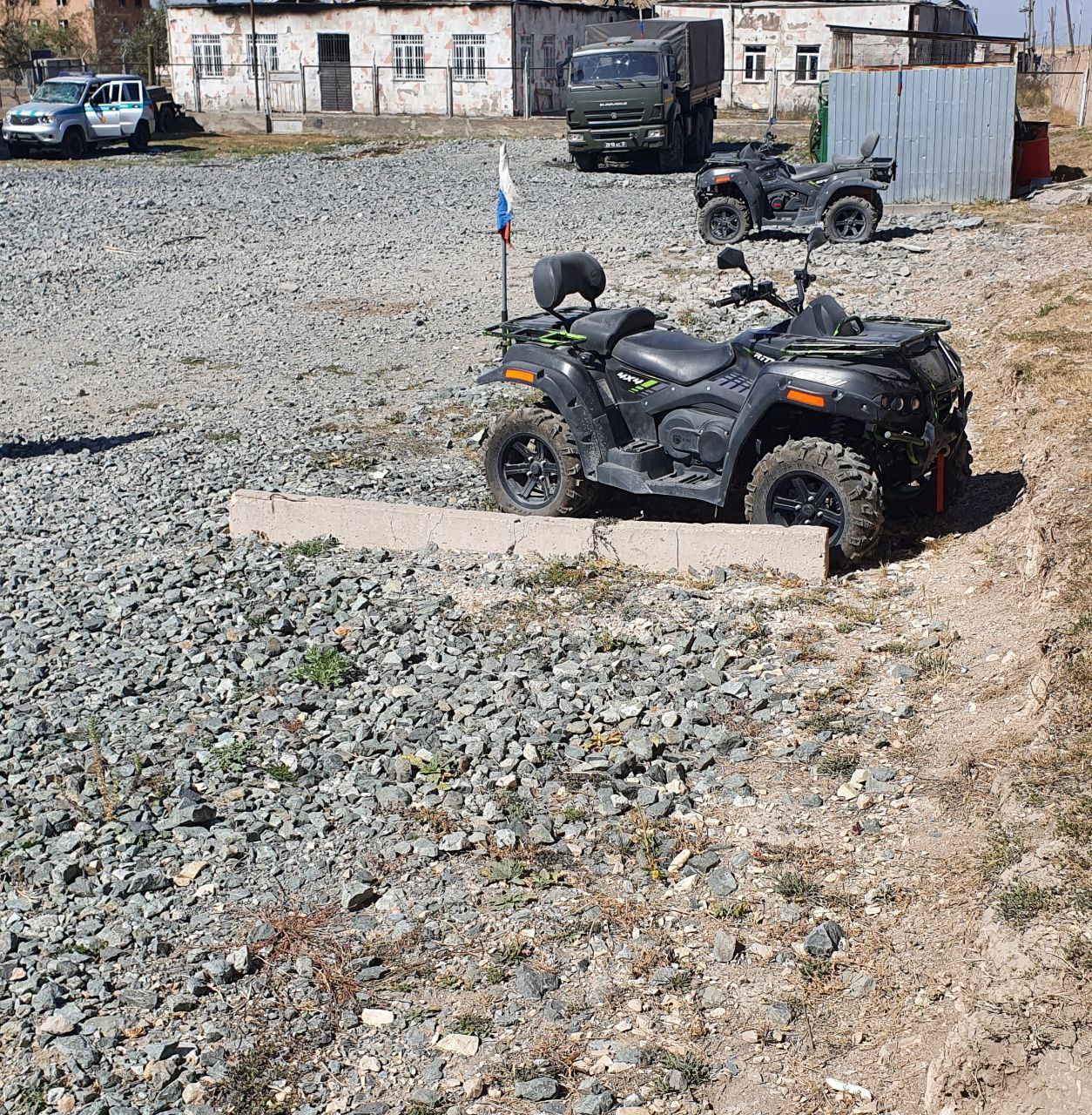

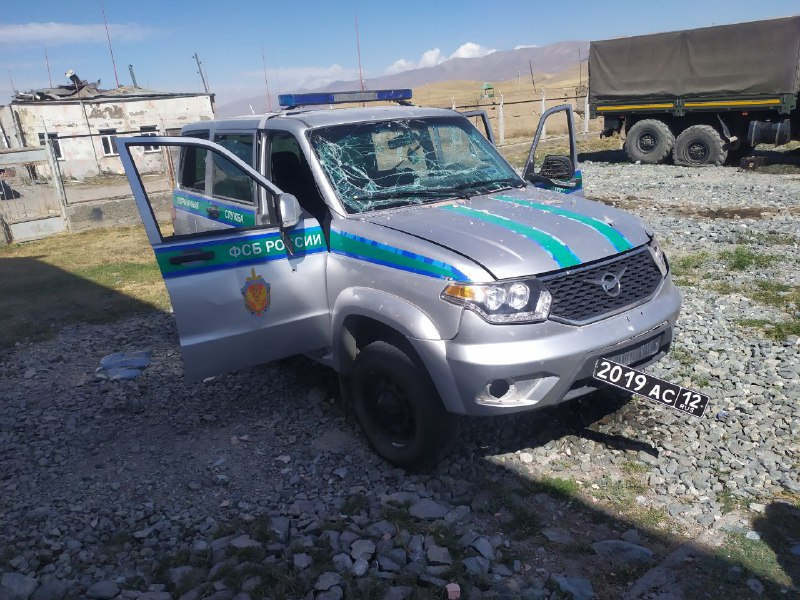

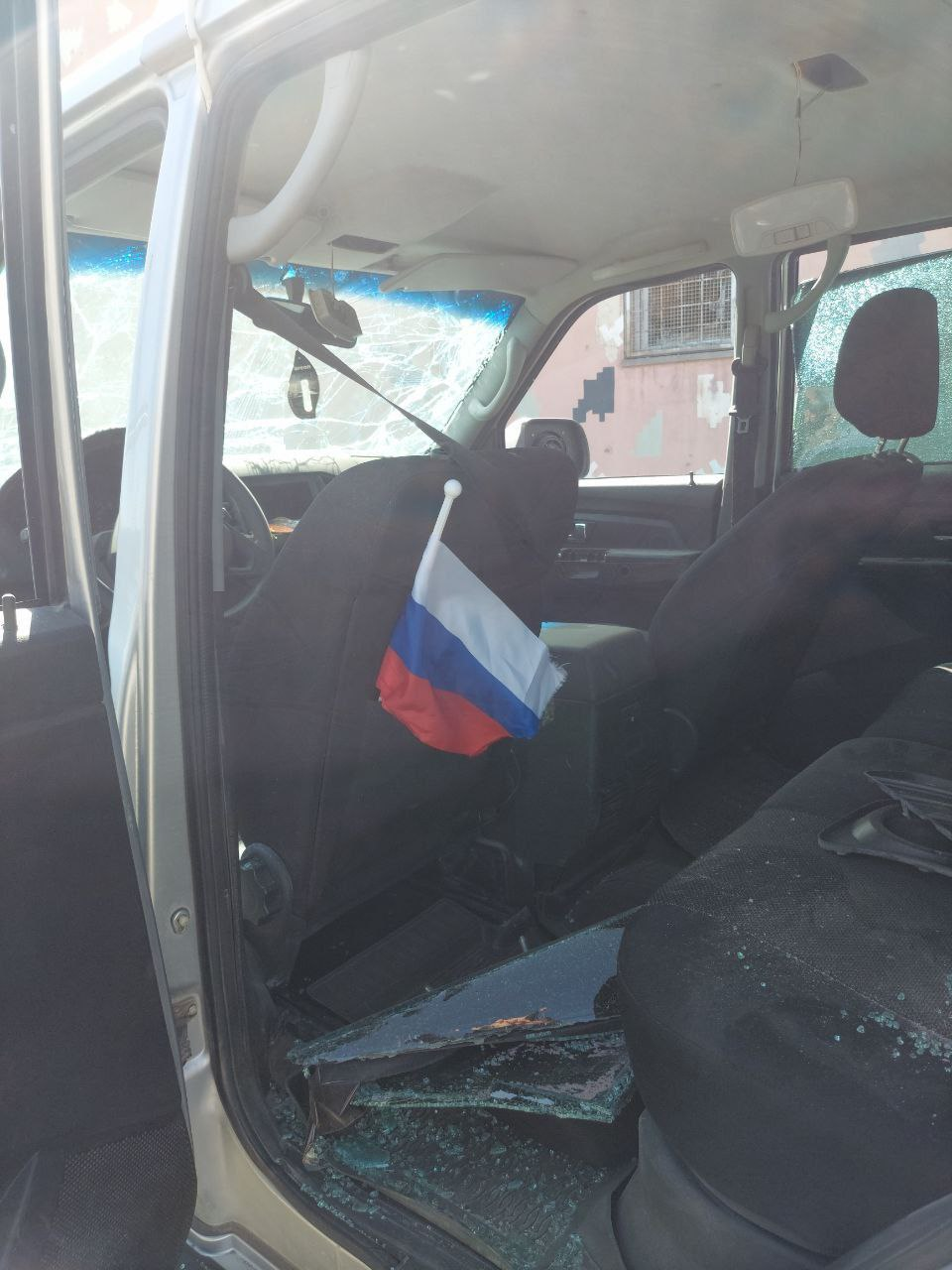

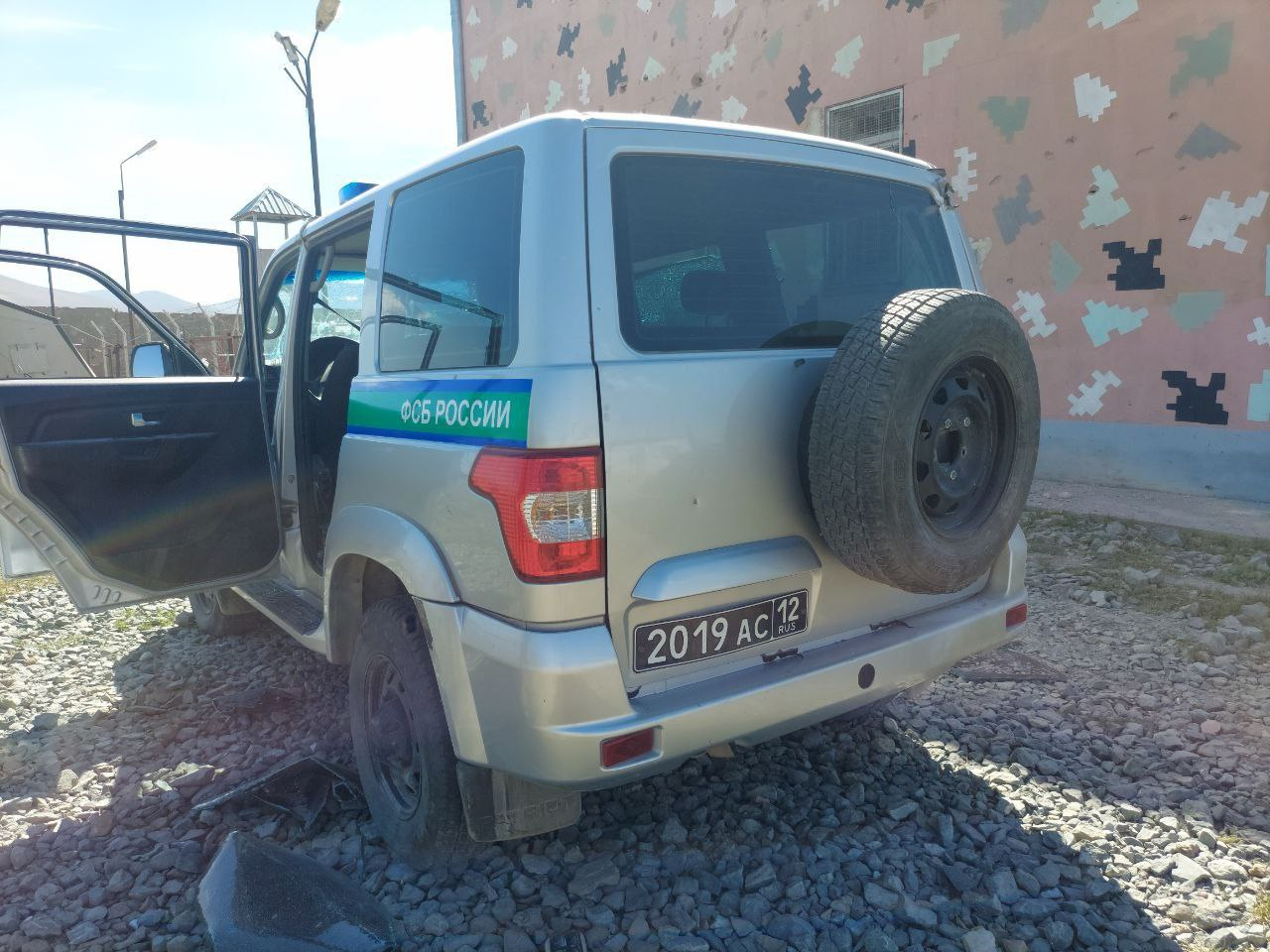

== Suspected war crimes and crimes against humanity ==
Videos of war crimes committed by Azerbaijani forces presumably occurring during the September 2022 offensive began to circulate online after the event.

Azerbaijan is holding at least seven Armenian prisoners of war (POWs), but video evidence suggests the number to be higher.

Footage circulating on Telegram depicted a female Armenian soldier who was mutilated by Azerbaijani forces. The video showed the woman completely naked, with words written across her breasts and stomach. A stone was inserted into one of her eye sockets, a severed finger had been placed in her mouth, and her legs had been sliced off from her body. The General Staff of the Armenian Armed Forces stated that "the Azerbaijani armed forces committed atrocities after infiltrating into Armenia's territory; they have dismembered a woman service member, cut off her legs, fingers and stripped her naked".

Armenia accused Azerbaijan of killing another POW in captivity. Davit Gishian, a POW who was seen injured and being insulted on an amateur video spread on Azerbaijani social media, was among the bodies of soldiers returned to the Armenian side.

On the morning of 2 October, a video depicting Azerbaijani military forces corralling and executing a group of six Armenian prisoners of war (military personnel) by machine gun fire was released on Telegram channels. The footage, if genuine, clearly depicts a war crime (execution of POWs) and Azerbaijan announced that it was opening an investigation into the event.

According to the office of Armenia's human rights ombudsman, the video was filmed on Armenian territory on 13 September 2022, during an Azerbaijani attack along Armenia's border. Armenia's Foreign Ministry released a statement calling for accountability and increased pressure on Azerbaijan by the international community, followed by statements of condemnation from EU, UK, France Canada, US and other countries. In response the Azerbaijani Prosecutor's Office stated that the latest footage was being investigated. The video's release occurred hours before scheduled peace negotiations between Armenian and Azerbaijani foreign ministers in Geneva and threatened to derail the peace discussions.

Azerbaijan has previously been found guilty of torturing and killing Armenian POWs and not conducting investigations into these crimes.

== Infrastructure damage ==
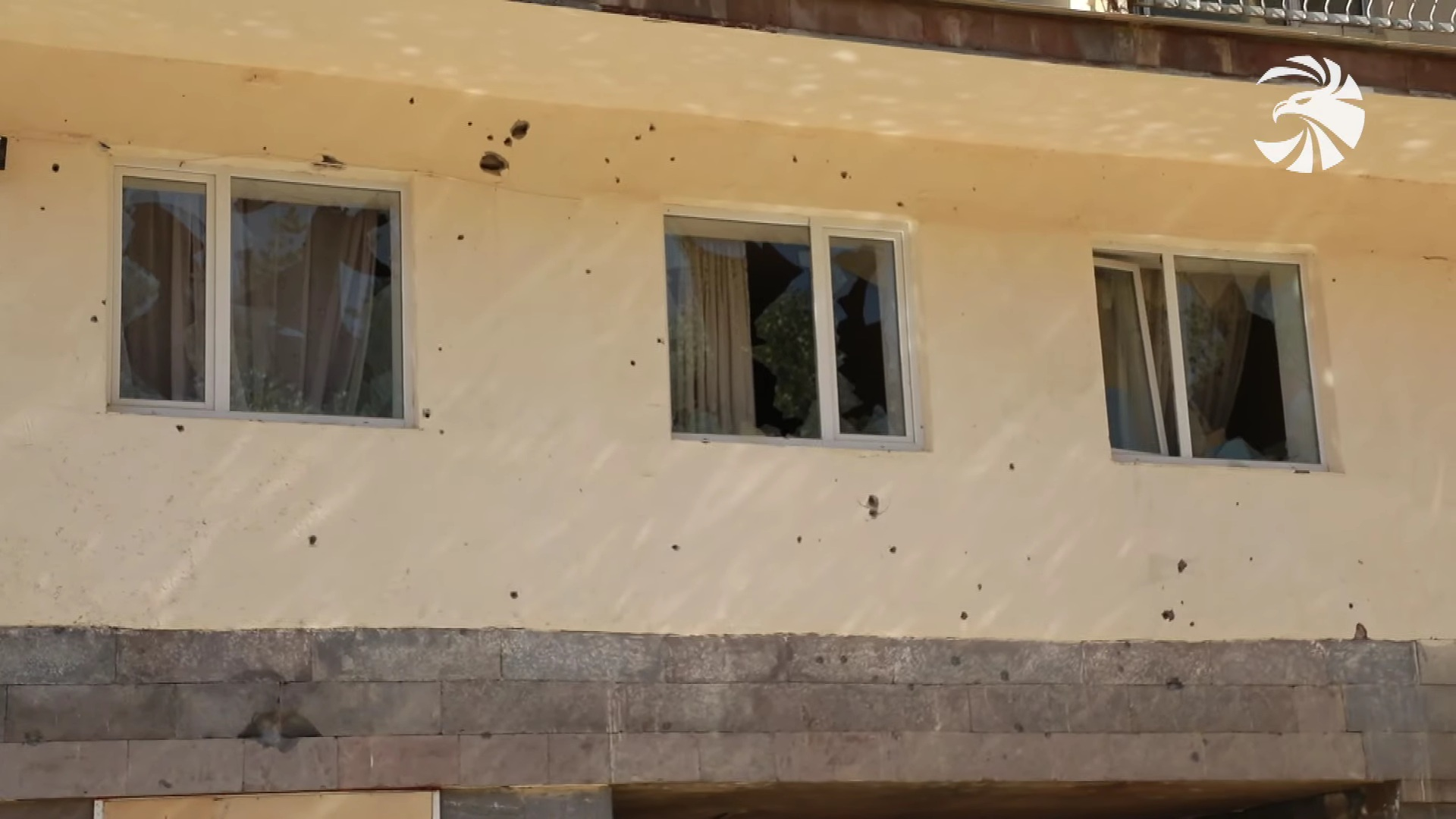
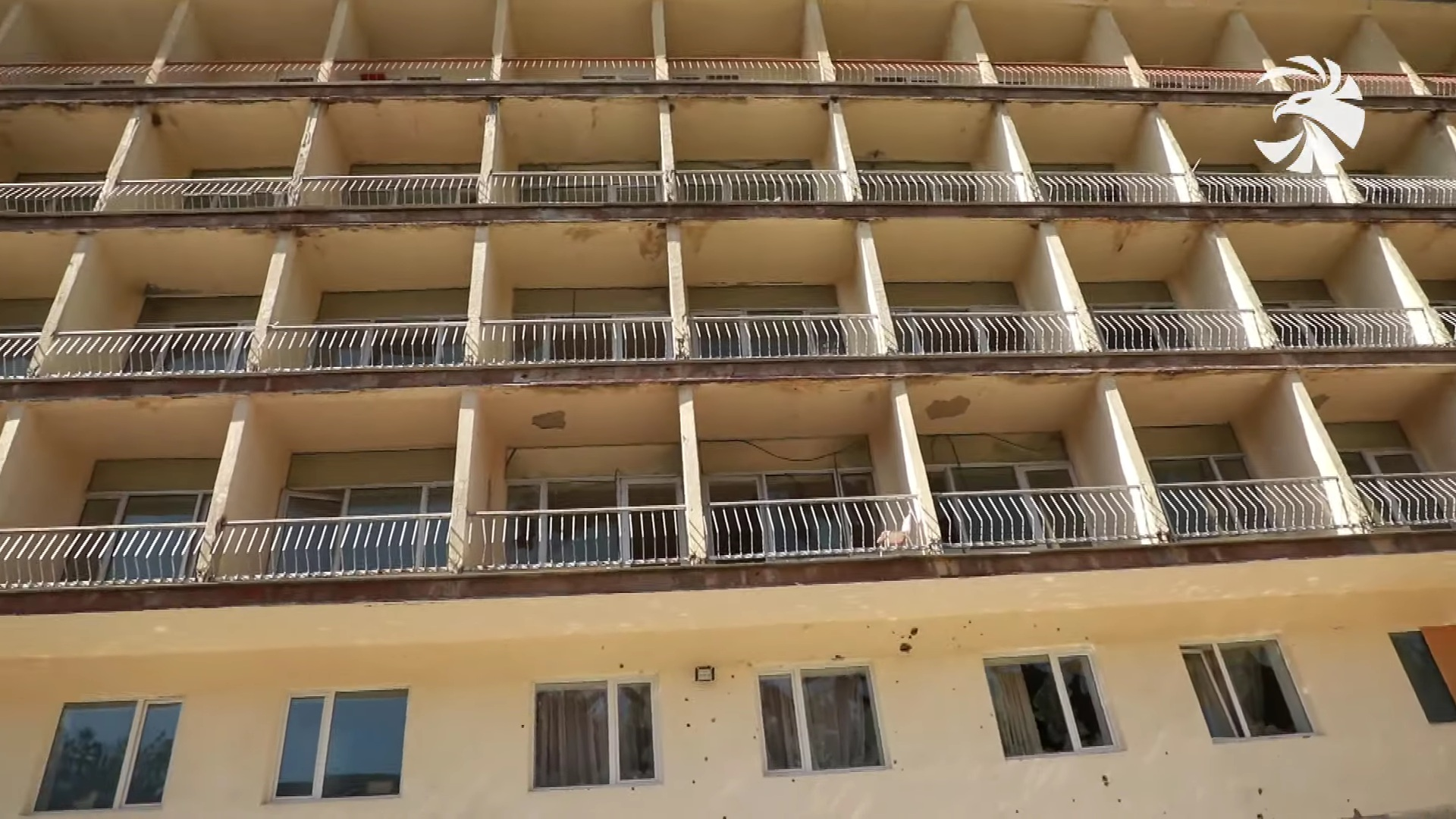
A residential apartment in Jermuk shelled by the Azerbaijani army

According to the preliminary data published by Armenia's Deputy Minister of Territorial Administration and Infrastructure, as a result of Azerbaijani shelling, 192 residential houses were damaged in the Armenian provinces of Syunik, Gegharkunik and Vayots Dzor with 60 of them being completely damaged. Human Rights Defender of Armenia stated that more than 7,500 people had been displaced from their homes. On 14 September, it was reported that Azerbaijani missiles had also struck a Russian FSB office in Gegharkunik Province.

On 13 September, Armenia's Emergency Situations Ministry spokesperson reported that Azerbaijan's shelling caused forest fires in Jermuk. At a UN Security Council meeting, Armenia's permanent representative Mher Margaryan condemned Azerbaijan's attack on Jermuk saying: "The shelling of the resort town of Jermuk, which has absolutely no military targets is nothing short of war crime, and so are the strikes against the Kechut water reservoir, with potentially catastrophic human toll and environmental impact". On 16 September, the heads of diplomatic missions and international organizations accredited in Armenia arrived in Jermuk to get acquainted with the consequences of the shellings.

== Effects ==
=== Cancelled events ===
In Azerbaijan, in connection with the death of the military personnel of the Azerbaijani Armed Forces, solemn events dedicated to the "Knowledge Day" and "National Music Day" were canceled, the Azerbaijan Weightlifting Championship among youth was postponed. Upcoming concerts of Ukrainian singers Max Barskih and Tina Karol in Azerbaijan were cancelled after the two artists expressed their support to Armenia. Barskih stated that "any country that launches aggression against another country is no place for my concerts". Various foreign embassies including those of France, Britain, and the United States, issued travel advisories against visiting southern Armenia and areas which share a border with Azerbaijan, including the provinces of Syunik, Vayots Dzor, as well as southern Gegharkunik, and parts of Tavush.

=== Protests in Armenia and Nagorno-Karabakh ===
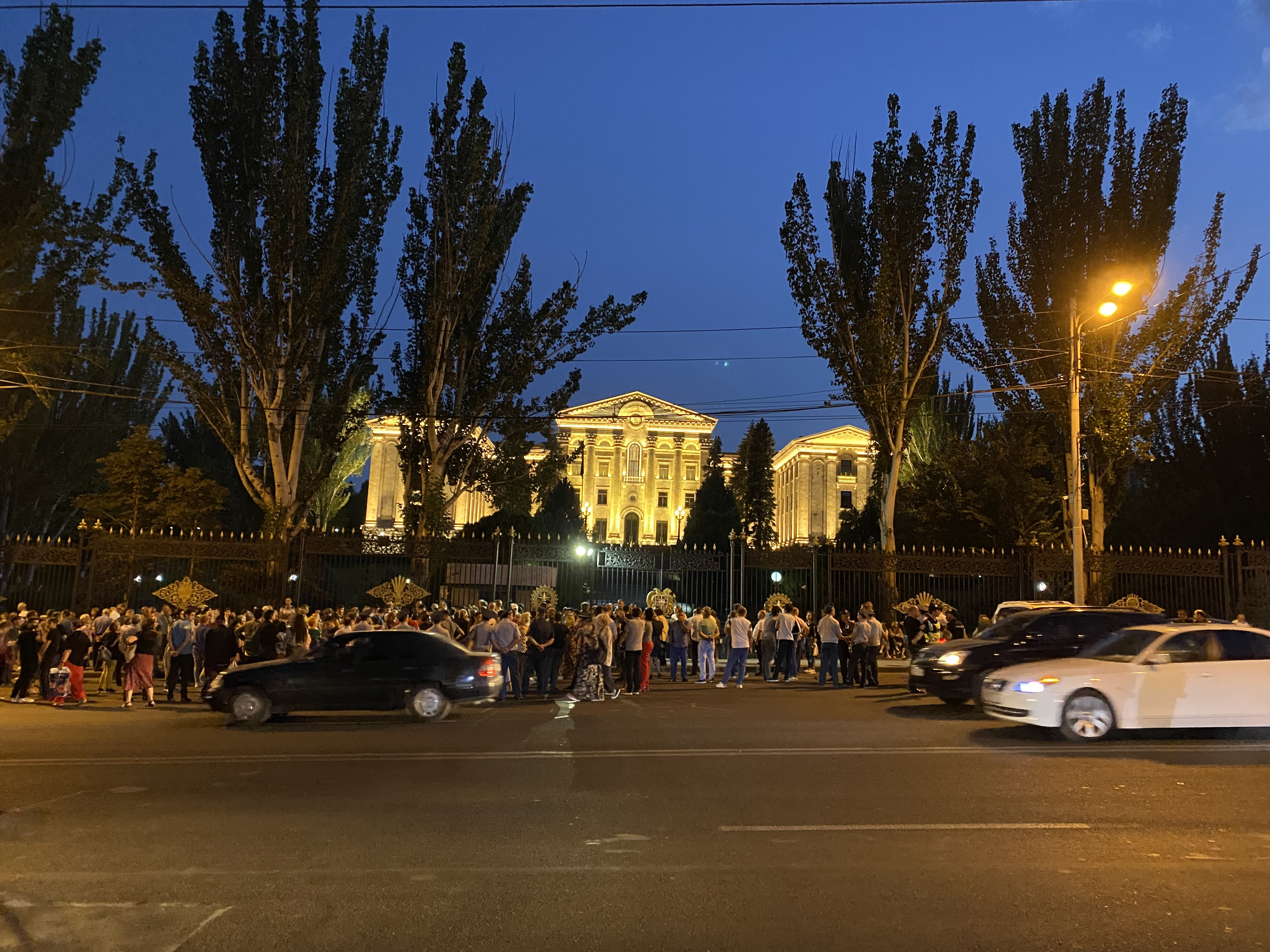
Protests in front of National Assembly of Armenia, 13 September 2022

On 14 September, protests erupted in Armenia's capital, Yerevan, and in Stepanakert, the capital of the self-proclaimed Republic of Artsakh calling for Nikol Pashinyan's resignation over his statements about a signing a potential peace agreement with Azerbaijan that would cause his government to "be criticized, cursed, called traitors".

In Yerevan, protesters attempted to take down a barrier and access the parliament building, but were prevented by authorities, who decided to weld the gate. One opposition leader, Karin Tonoyan, urged protesters to start blockading government buildings and also issued a call for a nationwide strike. The protesters chanted "Nikol the traitor". Protesters near Yerevan's parliament building called on deputies to come to their offices and impeach Pashinyan. Former Armenian Defense Minister Seyran Ohanyan reported that 35 opposition MPs signed a document to begin the impeachment procedure against Pashinyan. On the night of 15 September, opposition MPs proceeded to the parliament building to begin the impeachment process against Pashinyan, and were joined by demonstrators.

In Stepanakert, thousands of protesters gathered to demand the resignation of the government in Armenia. The president of the self-proclaimed republic, Arayik Harutyunyan, responded to the protests by making a statement in which he rejected the prospect of Nagorno-Karabakh being part of Azerbaijan under any status, saying "the people of Artsakh decide their own destiny in their own homeland". He later added assurances that the negotiation process was not at a stage where a document would be signed any time soon, and affirmed that he had an agreement with the Armenian government that any such document signed by them "must take into account Artsakh's interests and the opinion of the people of the republic".

On 18 September, the National Democratic Pole and European Party of Armenia organized a demonstration in Yerevan, demanding that Armenia withdraw its membership from the Collective Security Treaty Organization and start negotiations with other allies to create a new system of security.

=== Anti-war opposition in Azerbaijan ===
A number of Azerbaijani activists and opposition politicians voiced their criticism of the Azerbaijan government on their social media accounts following the military attacks. Ali Karimli and Arif Hajili questioned the high number of deaths and the reason for the offensive, while others like Azar Gasimli and Nida Civic Movement posted anti-war messages. Following this, government-linked social media accounts started a campaign against these voices of opposition, branding them as "traitors". The youth wing of the ruling New Azerbaijan Party (YAP) published a video compilation of various opposition representatives, who had expressed criticism with respect to the military attack, under the hashtag "#xainləritanı", which stands for: “know the traitors.”

Ahmad Mammadli, the chair of an Azerbaijani pro-democracy group, was allegedly abducted on 20 September and later sentenced to 30 days in prison by a district court in Baku. Both Mammadli and the D18 Movement, of which he is a part, had posted several statements criticizing the Azerbaijani government after the military escalation. Independent Azerbaijani lawyer Samad Rahimli stated that he believes the prison sentence was ‘for criticizing the recent border clashes and Ilham Aliyev’.

=== Sports ===
On 15 September, Qarabağ FK requested from UEFA for a minute of silence to be observed in honor of the fallen Azerbaijani soldiers during the Europa League group stage match against FC Nantes in Baku. The head of the press service of the club, Gunduz Abbaszadeh, stated that such a move was not allowed by UEFA. Following that, the team's largest fan group, İmarət Tayfa, published a statement calling on everyone to observe a minute of silence after the starting whistle to respect the memories of the deceased Azerbaijani soldiers. It was quickly distributed to a large number of users on the social network. Despite UEFA's ruling, approximately 30,000 spectators turned on their phones' flashlights and observed a minute of silence following the starting whistle.

== Analysis ==
Azerbaijan claimed that Armenian forces had staged "large-scale subversive acts" using "saboteurs" who planted landmines, an allegation the government spread during the days following the invasion and also echoed by Azerbaijan's ally Turkey. Various journalists, politicians, and political analysts have scrutinized these allegations and consider them unfounded or unverifiable. Arkady Dubnov, a political scientist and expert on the Southern Caucasus said "This doesn't look convincing, and everyone understands that this was a contrived excuse. No Azeri officials have provided any evidence to substantiate the incursion."

Certain journalists and human rights organizations condemned popular media for not naming the aggressor and for misreporting the conflict as taking place in Nagorno-Karabakh. Thomas de Waal, a journalist and author of several books on the Caucasus, stated that media reports misleadingly described the fighting as "border clashes" and made reference to the disputed territory of Nagorno-Karabakh despite the fact "no fighting took place in Karabakh...or indeed in Azerbaijani territory; it was all inside the territory of Armenia." Brandon Balayan, an American journalist, says that The New York Times and The Associated Press inaccurately reported the fighting as "an ordinary [border] skirmish...over Nagorno-Karabakh...when in reality Azerbaijan attacked Armenia proper." The Lemkin Institute for Genocide Prevention criticized Western media outlets for using imprecise language such as "clash," "tensions," "flare up," "hostilities," during the September attacks and stated that "Western media needs to tell the truth and call the war on Armenia what it is: an aggressive war with clearly demonstrated genocidal intent against Armenians."

According to Laurence Broers, Azerbaijan attacked now because of the sense that it is the moment to use power to take as much as possible, and because Russia, a mediator between Armenia and Azerbaijan, is distracted with its war in Ukraine. He stated that there is a possibility of the creation of new buffer zones in at least the southern half of Armenia, and that outside players are weak to prevent this from happening.

== Reactions ==
=== Countries ===
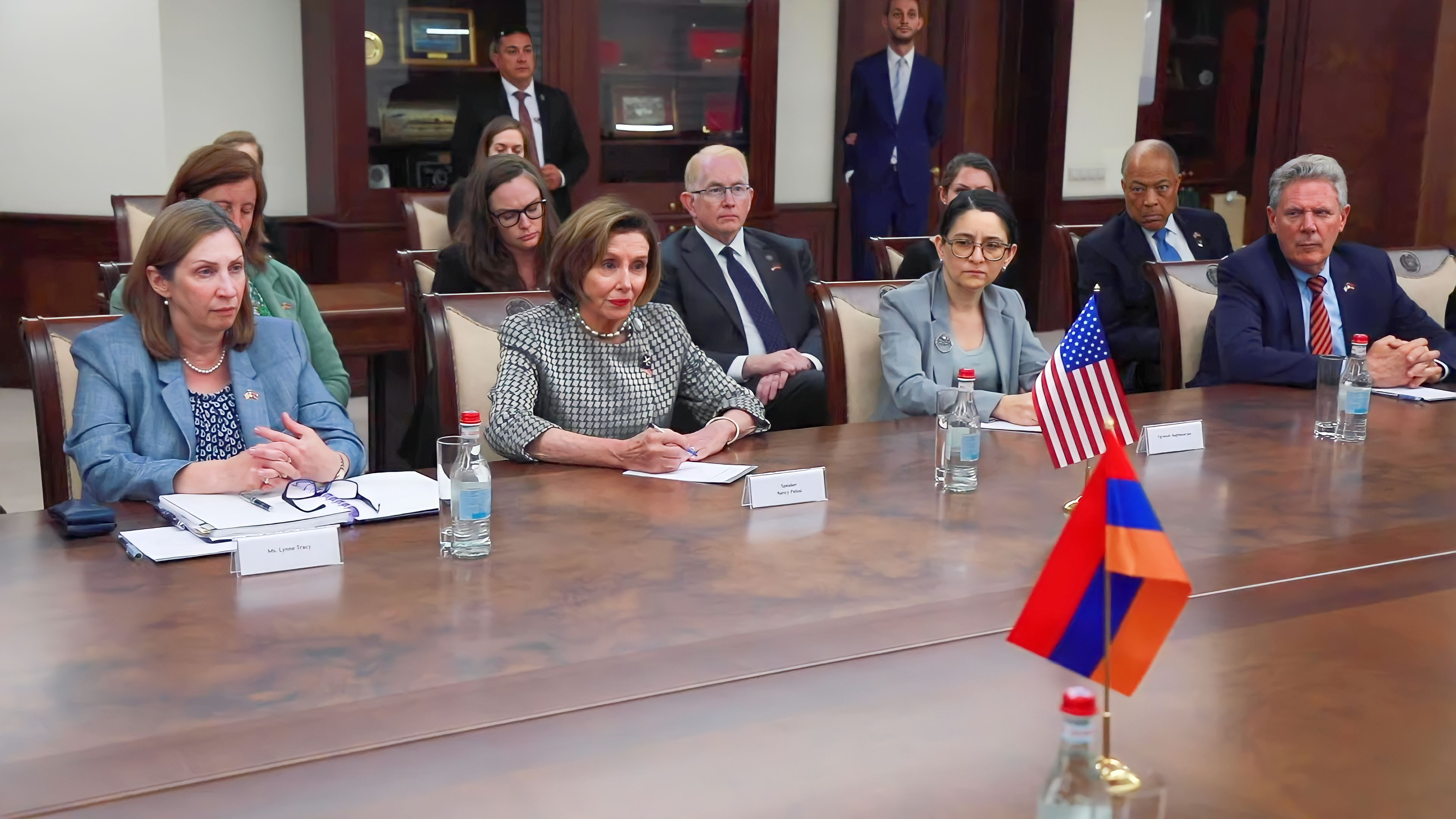
Nancy Pelosi during a meeting with Ministry of Defence of Armenia on 18 September 2022

- Armenia - On January 30, 2023 Armenia presented a map to the International Court of Justice which documents the territories it claims have been seized by Azerbaijan.
- United States Secretary of State Antony Blinken expressed concern over the clashes and urged both nations to end new hostilities immediately, followed by a phone call with Ilham Aliyev to express concern over the conflict along the Armenia–Azerbaijan border, including Azerbaijani shelling in Armenia, and asked President Aliyev to cease Azerbaijani hostilities.
  - Spokesperson for the United States Department of State Ned Price stated that the U.S. was reviewing evidence of Azerbaijani shelling inside Armenia, which has caused "significant damage to Armenian infrastructure," and stressed the need for both parties to end hostilities and agree to a broader de-escalation.
  - During the clashes, US House of Representatives speaker Nancy Pelosi visited Yerevan, on 17 September, meeting Nikol Pashinyan and other top officials of Armenia. She announced a visit to the Armenian capital of Yerevan as a show of support to the country. Additionally, the Armenian government has stated that the latest ceasefire was reached in large part thanks to the intervention of the United States. In an interview to television, the speaker of the parliament of Armenia underscored the importance of the role the US played in stabilizing the situation. Pelosi released a statement condemning the "illegal and deadly attacks by Azerbaijan" which "threatens prospects for a much-needed peace agreement."
  - In a subsequent call with Baku on 18 September, Antony Blinken "urged President Aliyev to adhere to the ceasefire, disengage military forces" and work to resolve all issues through peaceful negotiations.
- The Russian Ministry of Foreign Affairs called on both parties to adhere to the Russian-brokered ceasefire of 13 September. It refrained from saying who Russia saw as responsible for the escalation. It also stated that the dispute between Armenia and Azerbaijan should be resolved through purely political and diplomatic means.
- French President Emmanuel Macron called on Azerbaijan to return to an observance of the ceasefire agreement and respect the territorial integrity of Armenia. France raised the conflict as a topic of discussion at the UN Security Council.
  - On 27 September, after a meeting with the Prime Minister of Armenia in Paris, French President Emmanuel Macron had another phone conversation with the President of Azerbaijan to reiterate his calls to respect the ceasefire, return Azerbaijani forces to their initial positions and to respect the territorial integrity of Armenia.
  - In an interview on France 2 television, Macron accused Russia of "deliberately provoking" the clashes in an "effort to destabilize the volatile region." On 14 October, Putin responded by calling Macron's accusations "inappropriate" and "unacceptable".
  - On 15 November the French Senate adopted a resolution with an almost unanimous vote (one against) calling for the "withdrawal of Azeri forces from the sovereign territory of Armenia" and respect (by the Azerbaijani authorities and all their partners, in particular Turkey) for the territorial integrity, sovereignty and independence of Armenia. It also called on the French Government "to consider, together with its European partners, the strongest appropriate responses – including seizure of assets of Azerbaijani leaders and an embargo on imports of gas and oil from Azerbaijan – to sanction the military aggression carried out by the Azerbaijani forces on the territory of the Republic of Armenia" and to do everything possible to ensure that Azerbaijan engages in a process of negotiations through diplomatic channels to achieve lasting peace in the South Caucasus. On 30 November the National Assembly adopted a subsequent resolution unanimously condemning Azerbaijan's aggression against Armenia.
- (Turkey) Turkish Foreign Minister Mevlüt Çavuşoğlu tweeted "Armenia should cease its provocations and focus on peace negotiations and cooperation with Azerbaijan". Member of Parliament, Mustafa Destici, threatened "to erase Armenia from history and geography" in a tweet.
- The Ministry of Foreign Affairs of Cyprus condemned the Azerbaijani assault against Armenian positions.
- The Ministry of External Affairs of India called upon "the aggressor side to immediately cease hostilities".
- The Minister of Foreign Affairs of Kazakhstan Mukhtar Tleuberdi released a statement saying "We must proceed from the fact that the border between Azerbaijan and Armenia is not delimited, so it's hard to talk about any violation of the border".
- China's Permanent Representative to the UN Zhang Jun urged restraint in the conflict and called for a resolution of the Nagorno-Karabakh issue based on mutual dialogue.
- Iran's Foreign Minister Hossein Amir-Abdollahian told a representative from Azerbaijan that the border between Iran and Armenia must remain unchanged and called on both sides to show restraint.
- (United Kingdom) In response to a written inquiry the UK Embassy in Armenia stated that "the armed forces should be withdrawn to the positions they held prior to this outbreak of hostilities." and condemned the targeting of civilian areas.
- (Greece) During an official visit to Armenia on 27 September, Greek Foreign Minister Nikos Dendias stated: "We believe in the inviolability of borders, and I am referring to the incidents that happened just a few days ago following the shelling of Armenian territory, including inhabited areas, by the Azeri military forces."
  - On 4 October, the Greek Ministry of Foreign Affairs "strongly condemned the acts of violence" and called for a "thorough investigation to ensure perpetrators are held to account" in reference to the "horrific reports of the execution of unarmed Armenian prisoners by Azerbaijani forces."
- (European Union) EU High Representative Josep Borrell condemned the incursions, stating that "Azerbaijan has bombarded and occupied parts of Armenian territory, areas that are well into Armenia" using artillery and drones and calling on Azerbaijan to withdraw its troops. He revealed that Armenia agreed to EU's offer to deploy a border monitoring mission, but Azerbaijan has refused it. In the same speech he also defended the recent EU gas deal with Azerbaijan. The 2022 Report on the implementation of the common foreign and security policy of the European Parliament: "Strongly condemns the latest military aggression by Azerbaijan on 12 September 2022 on the sovereign territory of Armenia, which constituted a breach of the ceasefire and is having serious consequences on the peace process; is also concerned by the alleged war crimes and inhuman treatment perpetrated by the armed forces of Azerbaijan against Armenian prisoners of war and civilians; reiterates that the territorial integrity of Armenia must be fully respected" and calls on Azerbaijan to "immediately withdraw from all parts of the territory of Armenia and to release the prisoners of war under their control".
- The Senate of Uruguay unanimously adopted a statement condemning Azerbaijan's "invasion of the internationally recognized part of the Republic of Armenia", calling for complete and impartial investigation "in the face of repeated reports of war crimes" committed by Azerbaijani soldiers against Armenian prisoners.

=== Organizations ===
- The Chair of European Parliament Delegation for relations with the South Caucasus (DSCA) issued a statement on what it called Azerbaijani aggression against Armenia, strongly condemning the "large-scale military attack" of Azerbaijani forces against targets in Armenian territory. A Joint statement by leading MEPs condemned the military confrontations and urged Azerbaijan to immediately end its offensive operations and respect Armenian territorial sovereignty. The European Union (EU) signed additional energy import deals with Azerbaijan to compensate for the loss of Russian-imported gas and to reduce its energy dependency on Russia. Several news articles claim that the EU's "energy alliance" with Azerbaijan limits its ability to fairly mediate the clashes.
- The Secretary General of the Organization of Turkic States expressed concern and condemned the "military provocation" of the Armenian Armed Forces. It also called on Armenia to comply with the ongoing agreements reached between the two countries.
- Freedom House called on Azerbaijan to "cease their deadly attacks" on Armenian targets and return to peace negotiations, stating that "military attacks on sovereign nations have no place in the rules-based international order".
- Genocide Watch issued a warning against "unprovoked attacks and genocidal rhetoric against ethnic Armenians", placing Azerbaijan at Stage 4: Dehumanization, Stage 7: Preparation, Stage 8: Persecution, and Stage 10: Denial.
- The International Association of Genocide Scholars – "condemns Azerbaijan's invasion of the Republic of Armenia and the ongoing aggression against the Armenian people in the Republic and in Artsakh (Nagorno-Karabakh) and expresses concern about the risk of genocide against the Armenian population of that entity"
- The Lemkin Institute for Genocide Prevention, which had issued a red flag alert for Azerbaijan's "genocidal ideology and practices" in August 2022, condemned Azerbaijan for its "war of aggression"

== See also ==
- 2023 Azerbaijani offensive in Nagorno-Karabakh
- 2021–2023 Armenia–Azerbaijan border crisis
- List of conflicts between Armenia and Azerbaijan
- Armenia–Azerbaijan relations
