= Murad Huseynov (pianist) =

Murad Huseynov Murad Hüseynov
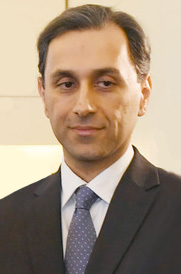

Deputy Minister of Culture
- Incumbent
- Assumed office 1 March 2023
- Minister: Adil Karimli

Personal details
- Born: 1 December 1973 (age 52) Baku, Azerbaijan SSR, USSR
- Musical career
- Instrument: piano

Murad Farid oghlu Huseynov (Azerbaijani: Murad Fərid oğlu Hüseynov, IPA: [mʊˈɾɑt fæˌɾid‿oɣˌɫʊ hyˈsejnof]; born 1 December 1973) is an Azerbaijani pianist who serves as the Deputy Minister of Culture since 2023. He holds the honorary title of People's Artiste of Azerbaijan.

== Biography ==
Murad Huseynov was born on 1 December 1973 in Baku. He began his career at the Bulbul Secondary Music School. He studied at the Baku Music Academy in 1991–1996 and graduated with honors, and in 1996–1999 he was a graduate student of the Baku Music Academy (class of Professor F. Badalbeyli). Huseynov was awarded a pension by the French government and in 2000–2002 he continued his professional music education at the Lyceum of the École Normale de Musique de Paris, and in 2004–2006 at the Moscow State Tchaikovsky Conservatory.

Murad Huseynov is a laureate (France, 1998) and a prize-winner (Tbilisi, Georgia, 1997) of international piano competitions. He is the winner of the 3rd International Piano Competition Françis Poulenc in Limoges (France, 2002). He also won three special awards for the best performance of works by French composers.

The pianist represents the performing culture of Azerbaijan in different countries of the world (France, England, United States, Italy, Spain, Turkey, Japan, Russia, Germany, Hungary, Georgia, Malta, Afghanistan, etc.). He has participated in many classical music festivals: Bach festival (Istanbul, 2000), Piano Festival (Istanbul, 2000), Piano Festival (Hiroshima, 2002), Musical Kremlin (Moscow, 2004) and so on.

The musician has performed in concerts with a number of famous orchestras and ensembles — Royal Philharmonic Orchestra (UK), Limoges Symphony Orchestra (France), Azerbaijan State Symphony Orchestra, Gara Garayev State Chamber Orchestra (Azerbaijan), New Russian Quartet (Russia) and others.

Murad Huseynov was also engaged in pedagogical activities at the Baku Music Academy. In November 2011, he was appointed director of the International Mugham Center of Azerbaijan. On 1 March 2023, he was appointed the Deputy Minister of Culture.

== Awards and honors ==
- People's Artiste of Azerbaijan – 20 December 2011
- Honored Artiste of Azerbaijan – 16 September 2005
- Presidential Award of the Republic of Azerbaijan – 2009, 2010, 2011
- French Senate Medal – 2011
- Ordre des Arts et des Lettres (Chevalier) – 2012
- Hungarian Order of Merit (Knight's Cross) – 2012
