= National Music Day in Azerbaijan =

National Music Day
- Observed by: Azerbaijan
- Type: State
- Celebrations: Concerts, Ceremonies
- Date: 18 September
- Next time: 18 September 2025
- Frequency: annual

National Music Day in Azerbaijan is a holiday annually celebrated on 18 September on the birthday of the founder of the modern professional musical art of Azerbaijan, Uzeyir Hajibeyov. It is a working day.

Traditionally, on this day, thousands of people gather in front of the Azerbaijan State Conservatory (nowadays the Baku Academy of Music) named in the honor of Hajibeyov. Here, the Azerbaijan State Symphony Orchestra, also named after Hajibeyov, under the direction of Niyazi, perform the works of the composer. This was Niyazi who initiated this tradition.

In 1995, the Azerbaijani President Heydar Aliyev issued a decree according to which this day began to be celebrated at state level.

The Ministry of Culture and Tourism of Azerbaijan organizes a number of events in connection with the celebration of the National Music Day dedicated to the memory of Uzeyir Hajibeyov: a solemn ceremony dedicated to this date is conducted in front of the building of the Baku Music Academy, a cultural event is being held in the premises of the Uzeyir Hajibeyov house-museum, a gala evening is carried out at the Heydar Aliyev Palace.
