= Baku Zoo =

Zoo Baku, Azerbaijan

Baku Zoo Bakı Zooloji Parkı
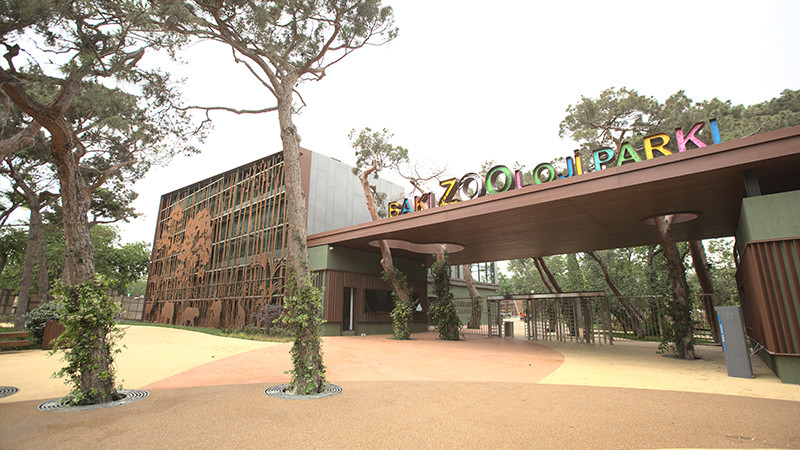
- Entrance of the zoo
- Interactive map of Baku Zoo; Bakı Zooloji Parkı
- Location: Baku city, N.Narimanov district, A.Bakikhanov 39
- Land area: 4.25 ha (10.5 acres)
- No. of animals: 850
- No. of species: 125
- Annual visitors: 60,000
- Website: bakuzoo.az

Baku Zoological Park (Azerbaijani: Bakı Zooloji Parkı), more commonly known as Baku Zoo, is a 10.5-acre zoo located in the Narimanov district of the capital city of Azerbaijan, Baku. It features over 125 species of animals, and is one of the most popular zoos in the country.

== History ==
In 1928 Baku Zoological Park operated as a small zoo corner in Lunacharsky, the current Nizami park of Baku City. On 2 January 1942, Zoological Park was created in a place of this small corner. Until the 1980s, the Zoological Park operated on a 1-hectare area in Bayil settlement. Since 1982, an area of 2.25 ha has been assigned for the use of the zoo. To ensure future development, the area of the Zoological Park was increased by 2 ha in 2001, and currently it is 4.25 ha.

Since 1995, a total of 60 species have settled in Baku Zoological Park, and there have been many innovations over the past years. During this time, dwarf deer (muntjac), kangaroo, zebu, chital, alpaca, llama, Amur tiger, leopard, jaguar, long-tailed monkeys, flamingos, Japanese crane, crowned crane, western swamphen, pheasants, various exotic birds, as well as Nile crocodiles, pythons, anacondas, and iguanas were brought to the zoo. Enclosures, including aviaries and terrariums for reptiles and 30 large-scale aquariums for various types of fish and plants living in tropical countries have been created suitable for animals’ lifestyle.

According to the law of the Republic of Azerbaijan, the Baku Zoological Park has been included in the list of "Specially protected natural areas and objects". Since 1995, Baku Zoological Park has been a member of the Eurasian Regional Association Zoos and Aquariums. In 2017, major repairs began at the Baku Zoological Park, and on 7 October 2021, the zoo opened its new doors to visitors.

=== Opening of the zoo ===
On October 7, 2021, the opening ceremony of the renovated Baku Zoological Park was held. The event introduced the new view of the zoo and the conditions of animals that had been moved to their new home. As a result of major reconstruction works, which lasted about 4 years, more pleasant aviaries, aquaterrarium, petting zoo, artificial lake, pools and a veterinary clinic are being offered for the residents of the Zoological Park. The aviaries have been sufficiently expanded and built considering the needs of each species. The Zoological Park complex has become a more comfortable and interesting place for visitors, and the total area has been increased almost twice, up to 4.25 hectares.

During the repair works, special attention was paid to the full protection of existing trees and shrubs on the site. In general, a more naturally landscaped environment has been created at the Zoological Park, and its green area increased to 6700 m2, ensuring both a well-being of animals and a pleasant visit for guests at the zoo. Along with other innovations and various entertainment sites, playground, lecture hall and an electronic excursion stands have also been placed and created on the zoo territory. The Zoological Park has become a place of recreation and education for all, including people with disabilities and visitors of all age groups. Following the renovation, the Zoological Park has become new not only in appearance, but also in its mission and approach. The main goal of the zoo is to become an educational, research and conservation center, where people can learn about the natural world, especially the rare fauna of Azerbaijan. In this regard, proper conditions have been created for the animal’s natural increase in the population and the reintroduction of species listed in the "Red Book" of Azerbaijan. Taking into account the importance of animal welfare and wildlife protection, no new animals are taken into the Zoological Park, and in some cases only, illegally kept or rescued wild animals may find shelter in the zoo.

Currently, 125 species, with 22 listed in the Red Book of Azerbaijan, dwell in the Baku Zoological Park, under the conditions as close to their natural habitats as possible. Amur tiger, African lion, leopard, jaguar, zebra, bison, brown bear, chital, red deer, alpaca, llama, kangaroo, maned sheep, wolf, fox, as well as various kinds of monkeys and other mammals are being taken care in the zoo. There are also various species of waterfowl (flamingo, pelican, species of ducks and swans), birds of prey (golden eagle, white-headed vulture, griffon vulture, osprey, white-tailed eagle, eagle-owl), exotic birds (macaw, cockatoo, grey parrot, rosella, Amazon parrot), pheasants, peacocks, western swamphen, Japanese crane, and such reptiles as snakes, crocodiles, iguanas, fish and turtles.

== Gallery ==
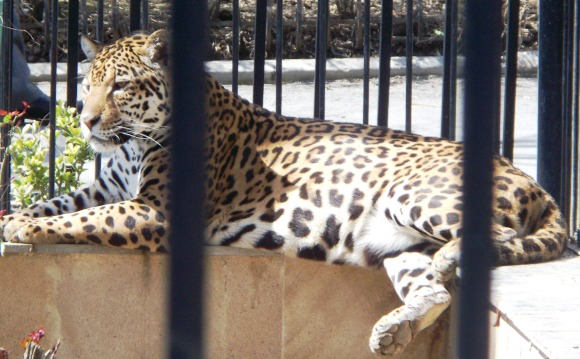
Jaguar

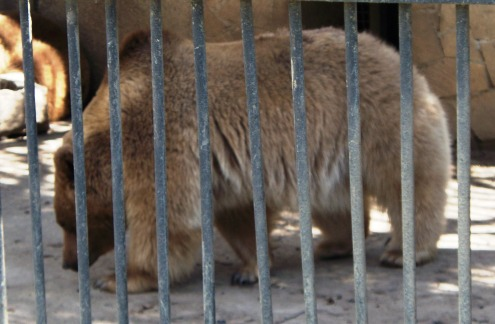
Brown bear

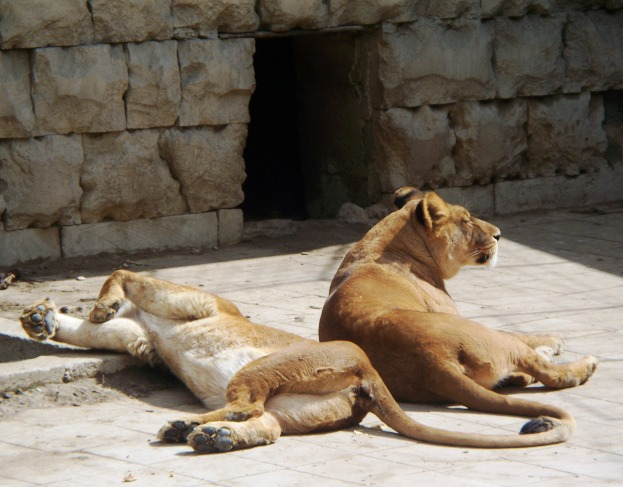
African lion

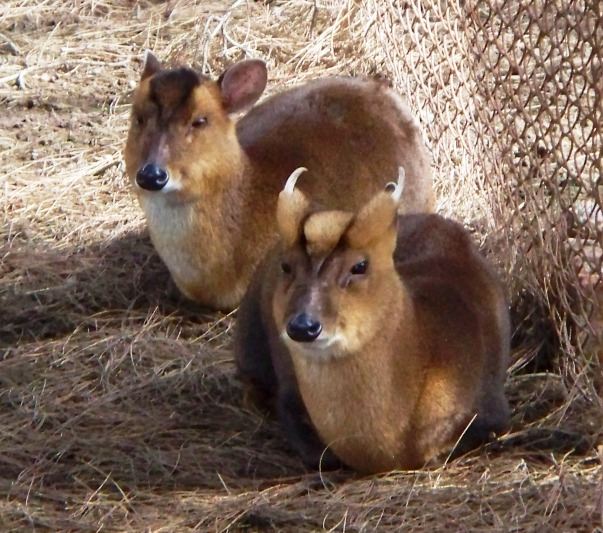
Muntjac

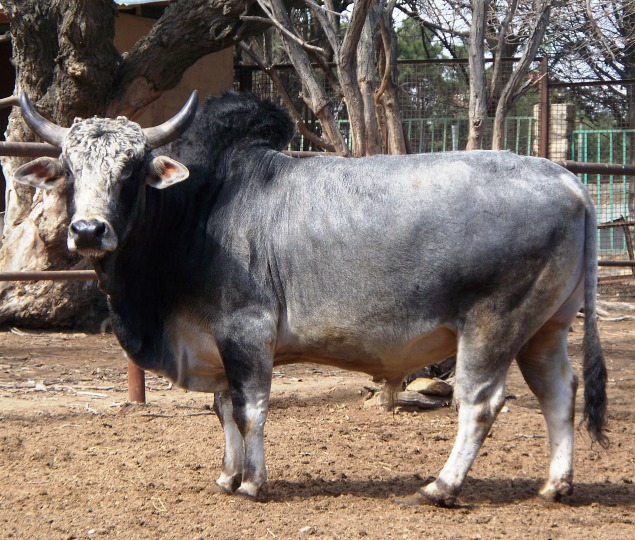
Zebu

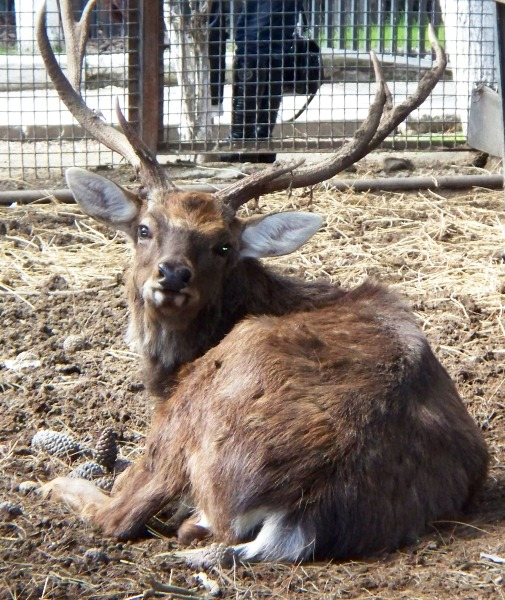
Red deer

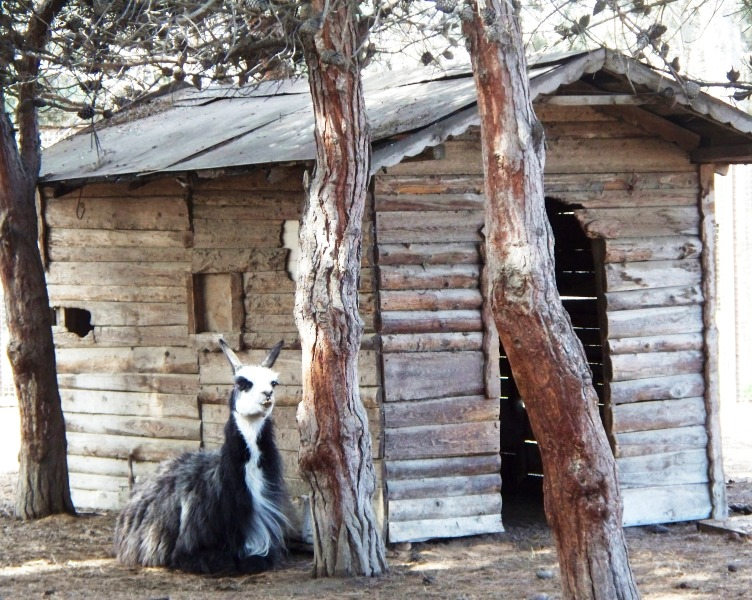
Llama

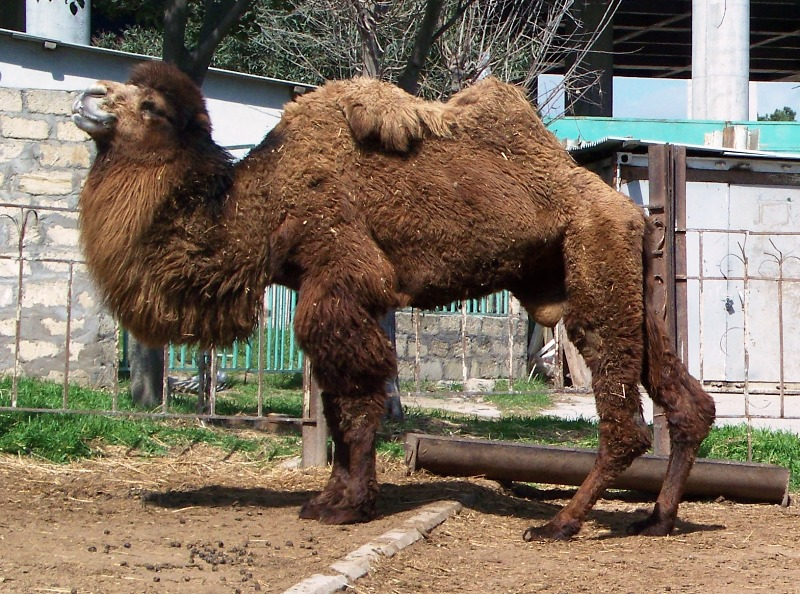
Bactrian camel

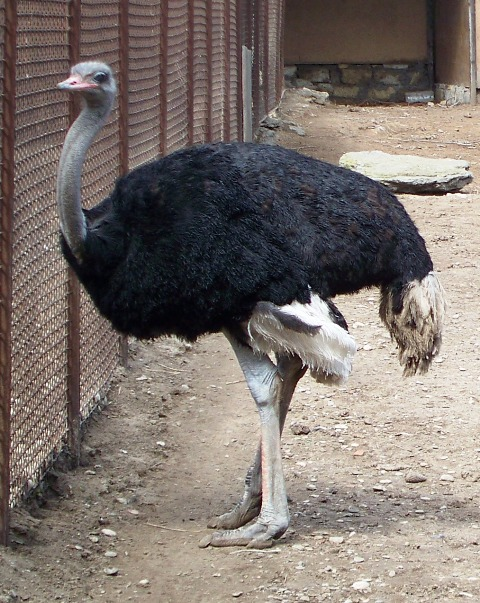
Ostrich

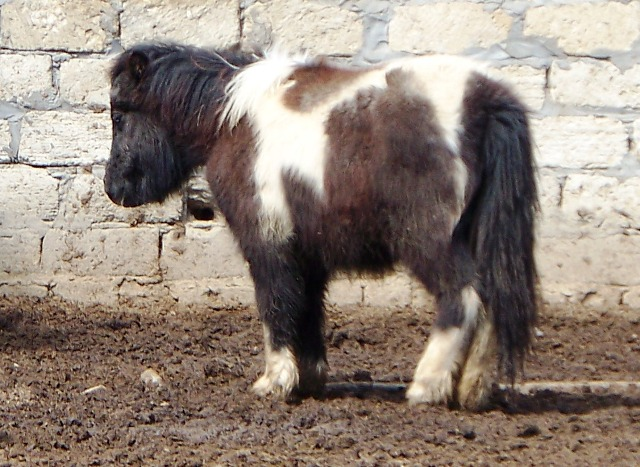
Shetland pony

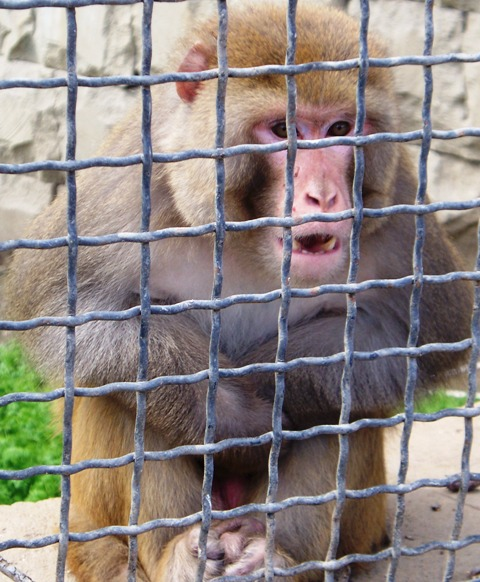
Rhesus macaque

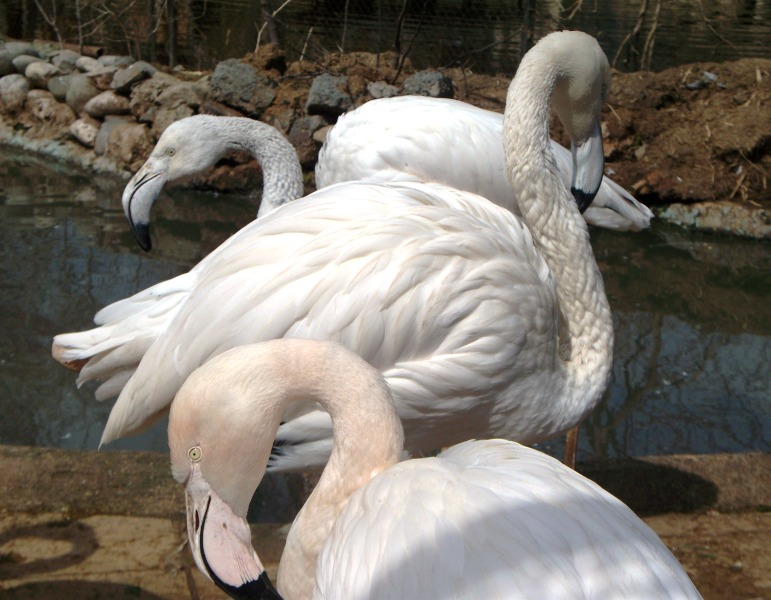
Greater flamingo

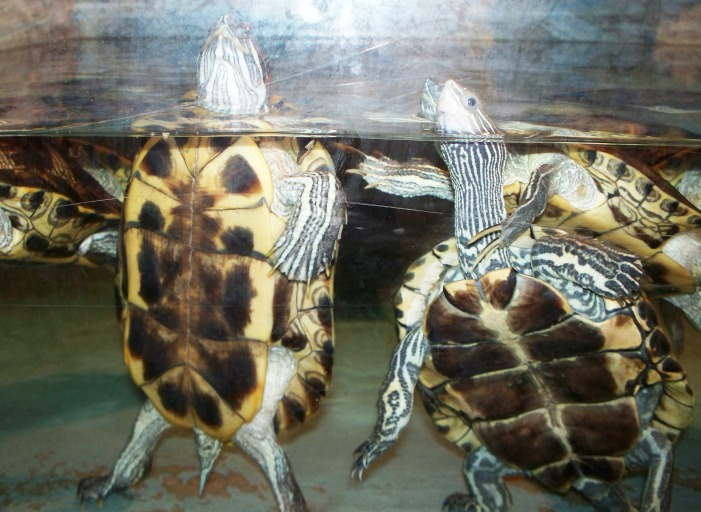
Turtle
