= Adil Karimli =

Azerbaijani politician

- Adil Kərimlı

Minister of Culture
- Incumbent
- Assumed office 14 April 2023 (Acting: 22 December 2022 – 14 April 2023)
- President: Ilham Aliyev
- Preceded by: Anar Karimov

First Deputy Minister of Culture
- In office 22 December 2022 – 14 April 2023
- President: Ilham Aliyev

Personal details
- Born: October 22, 1979 (age 47) Baku, Azerbaijan SSR, USSR
- Party: Independent
- Education: Baku State University
- Scientific career
- Fields: Criminal law

Adil Gabil oghlu Karimli (Azerbaijani: Adil Qabil oğlu Kərimlı; born October 22, 1979) is an Azerbaijani politician who serves as Minister of Culture of the Republic of Azerbaijan since 2023.

== Biography ==
Adil Karimli was born on October 22, 1979, in Baku. From 1986, he studied at Baku city school No. 42, in 1995, he graduated from high school and was admitted to the Faculty of Law of Baku State University. In 1999, he graduated from the Faculty of Law of the university with a bachelor's degree, and in 2001, a master's degree with honors. In 2002, he was admitted to the department of Criminal Law and Criminology of Baku State University as a doctoral student, and in 2007 he defended his PhD thesis and was received the scientific degree of Candidate of Law (Ph.D. in Law) on May 5, 2009.

Adil Karimli is fluent in English and Russian. He is a reserve officer specializing in military law.

== Career ==
Adil Karimli started his career in 1999 as a legal consultant at "Legal Literature" publishing house. In 2001–2003, he was a senior legal advisor at the Baku Law Center. Starting from 2001, he worked as a teacher at Baku State University, and since 2011 as a senior teacher. In 2003-2009, he was the head of the Legal Department at the Azerbaijan representative office of "Great Wall Drilling Company".

From 2005, Adil Karimli worked as the director of the legal and international relations department of the Ictimai Television and Radio Broadcasting Company. In 2007-2011, he was the head of the Azerbaijani delegation at the Eurovision Song Contest, and from August 2011 to August 2012, he worked as the head of the Working Group of the 2012 edition of the contest hosted in Baku. In 2007-2011, he was a member of the Legal and Public Affairs Committee of the European Broadcasting Union, and from 2011, he was a member of the Advisory Group on the Eurovision Song Contest of the European Broadcasting Union.

By the order of President Ilham Aliyev dated October 8, 2012, he was appointed as the First Deputy Director of Heydar Aliyev Center.

Adil Karimli headed the culture department at Expo 2015, Expo 2020 and other international events, and was the head of the Organizing Committee of the Azerbaijan pavilion at the Exhibition of Achievements of National Economy in Moscow.

He has been a member of the working group on the restoration and construction projects of the Heydar Aliyev Foundation in the Karabakh region, as well as Azerbaijani culture days organized by the foundation in several countries. He worked as a curator of cultural projects of the Heydar Aliyev Foundation in Germany, Great Britain, Italy and France.

In 2004–2010, Adil Karimli was a member of the Azerbaijani Bar Association. He was re-admitted to the membership of the association on July 1, 2022. He is also a Member of the Board of the Azerbaijan Automobile Federation.

By the orders of the President of Azerbaijan dated December 22, 2022, he was discharged from the position of the First Deputy Director of the Heydar Aliyev Center and was appointed the First Deputy and Acting Minister of Culture of the Republic of Azerbaijan.

On 14 April 2023, Adil Karimli was discharged from the position of the First Deputy Minister of Culture and was appointed the Minister of Culture.
