= Academy of Public Administration (Azerbaijan) =

Academy of Public Administration Azerbaijan
- Azərbaycan Respublikasının Prezidenti yanında Dövlət İdarəçilik Akademiyası
- Type: Public
- Established: 1921 (1999)
- Rector: Urxan Ələkbərov
- Address: Lermontov küç., 74 [AZ1001], Baku, Azerbaijan
- Website: https://dia.edu.az/

The Academy of Public Administration (Azerbaijani: Azərbaycan Respublikasının Prezidenti yanında Dövlət İdarəçilik Akademiyası lit. The Academy of Public Administration under the President of the Republic of Azerbaijan) is a scientific and educational institution established based on the Baku Institute of Social Management and Political Science by the Decree No. 60 of the president of the Republic of Azerbaijan dated January 3. 1999.

== History ==
- 1921–1928: Central Soviet Party School
- 1928−1956: Azerbaijan Central Soviet Party School
- 1956−1992: Baku Higher Party School (Higher Party School affiliated with the Central Committee of the Azerbaijan Communist Party)
- 1992–1999: Baku State Institute of Social Management and Political Science
- 1999–present: Academy of Public Administration under the President of the Republic of Azerbaijan

== Faculties ==
- Faculty of political administration - 504 students are studying in the faculty in the fields of "Political Science", "International Relations" and "Law", and 149 of them are excellent students. 55 of these excellent people are Presidential retirees. All students study with the Bologna porcesi credit system. There are 4 departments within the faculty: "Political science and political administration", "International relations and foreign policy", "State building and law", "Philosophy and social psychology" departments.
- Faculty of administrative management - The Faculty of Administrative Management has been operating since the establishment of the Academy of Public Administration. At the Faculty of Administrative Management, students are educated in the specialties of "State and municipal administration", "Sustainable development management", "Management", "Economy" and "Computer science" with a balloon credit system. There are 6 departments within the faculty - "Planning and management of sustainable development", "Public service and personnel policy", "State regulation of the economy", "Public administration and management", "Intelligent system management", "Information technologies in public administration" sections.

== See also ==
- Central Committee of the Communist Party of the Soviet Union
- Azerbaijan Soviet Socialist Republic
- Baku State University
- Azerbaijan Medical University
- Azerbaijan State University of Economics
