= Ministry of Culture (Azerbaijan) =

Government ministry of Azerbaijan

Ministry of Culture of the Republic of Azerbaijan
- Azərbaycan Respublikasının Mədəniyyət Nazirliyi

Agency overview
- Formed: 18 April 1953; 20 April 2018
- Jurisdiction: Government of Azerbaijan
- Headquarters: Azadliq Avenue 1, Government House, Baku, Azerbaijan Republic AZ1000
- Agency executive: Adil Karimli, Minister; Murad Huseynov, Deputy Minister; Saadat Yusifova, Deputy Minister; Farid Jafarov, Deputy Minister
- Website: www.culture.gov.az

The Ministry of Culture of Azerbaijan Republic (Azerbaijani: Azərbaycan Respublikasının Mədəniyyət Nazirliyi) is a governmental agency within the Cabinet of Azerbaijan in charge of regulation of the activities and promotion of Azerbaijani culture. The ministry is headed by Adil Karimli.

== General information ==
The ministry which is located in the capital of the country- Baku is funded mainly from the state budget. The Statute of the Ministry approved by the President determines the main directions, tasks, rights and organization of activity of this state body.

Government House, Baku

The institutions under the Ministry of Culture and Tourism of Azerbaijan include 28 theaters, 6308 historical and cultural monuments, 1 circus and 12 concert centers, 3985 libraries, 2708 clubs, 189 museums (with branches), 234 children's music schools, art and painting schools, 33 art galleries and exhibition hall, 21 state reserves, 60 cultural and leisure parks, 1 Zoo, a Scientific and Methodological Center for Culture, 4 Leisure Centers, 6 economic organizations, 7 film production studios, 134 city and district cinemas, tate Film Foundation (together with Nakhchivan branch), Republican Library College, newspaper (Culture), two magazines ("Cultural-educational" and "Window"), State Tourism Institute, Baku Choreography School, Cultural Staff Development Center, Mingachevir Tourism College, National Culinary Center, 62 cities and ray ten cultural and tourism departments, Ministry of Culture and Tourism of Nakhchivan Autonomous Republic, Baku, Ganja, Sumgayit tourism departments, Sheki Equestrian Center, Baku Tourism Information Center, Lankaran Children's Camp.

The Ministry carries out international cultural programs with the European, Asian and Islamic countries, the United States, as well as Latin America in line with interstate agreements of the Ministry. At the same time it promotes the culture of Azerbaijan through UN, GUAM, the Black Sea Economic Cooperation Organization, the European Union, the Organization of Islamic Conference, UNESCO, World Tourism Organization, TURKSOY, ISESCO and other international organizations, as well as promotion of world cultural values in Azerbaijan carries out significant programs in the field.

== History ==
The ministry was established in 18 April 1953 with a purpose of preservation, development, promotion of rich Azerbaijani culture and arts. The agency's included implementation of local and international cultural programs, projects and holding events in various countries. The objectives were to preserve and protect historical monuments and real estate, their renovation and use, modernization of libraries and museums, protection and promotion of Azerbaijani folklore, development of cultural clubs, resorts and parks, revitalization of tourism, development of theater, musical and other forms of arts, revitalization of cinema and book publications and so forth.

== Organization ==
The ministry is headed by the minister with three deputy ministers. Main functions of the ministry are implementation of state policies in the tourism sector and promotion of Azerbaijani culture, formulation and implementation of short-, mid- and long-term strategies and programs, increasing activities in cultural sector among the youth, create conditions for every citizen to contribute to the cultural development in Azerbaijan, increase production of Azerbaijani films, etc.

== Structure ==
The structure of the Ministry consists of its apparatus and local and other local departments and together form a single system. The Ministry carries out its activities directly and through these institutions.

The structure of the Ministry is approved by the President of the Republic of Azerbaijan. The Ministry is headed by a minister who is appointed to office and dismissed by the President of the Republic of Azerbaijan. The Minister is personally responsible for the tasks entrusted to the Ministry.

The Ministry has 3 deputy ministers that also appointed and dismissed by the President of the Republic of Azerbaijan. The deputy ministers fulfill the duties entrusted to them by the minister and are personally responsible for them.

The Minister organizes and leads the activities of the Ministry by distributing responsibilities among its deputies, and determining the authorities of them together with the officials of the ministry, and heads of the institutions included in the structure of the Ministry on cadre, financial, economic and other issues and ensuring the coordination among them;

The structure of the Ministry is composed of following institutions and departments:

- Ministerial Board
- Ministry Administration
- Arts Department
- Department for museum affairs and control over cultural resources
- Cinematography Department
- Department for folk art and cultural routes development
- Department for book circulation and work with publishing houses
- Department of regional policy
- International cooperation and innovative development Department
- Creative industries and digital development Department
- Department for civil service and personnel
- Economics Department
- Finance and accounting Department
- Department for law and internal control
- Department for work with documents and citizens applications
- Information and public relations Department
- Technical Supply and Property Management Department
- Protocol Division
- Division for science and research

On April 6, 2026, based on the concept "Culture of Azerbaijan – 2040," two new departments were created – strategic development and communications, as well as event management and projects in the field of art, and a new sector – financial monitoring and audit.

== The duties of the Ministry ==
The main duty of the Ministry is to protect of the culture of Azerbaijan. It preserves all the cultural heritage including the ancient and modern culture, and develops them. It fulfills different cultural programs, designs projects covering all the spheres of the culture, contribute cultural state policy, compile and control the activities of the cultural institutions under the Ministry.

State Service for Protection, Development and Restoration of Cultural Heritage is operating under Ministry of Culture. The service established according to the Decree No. 409 of the President of the Republic of Azerbaijan dated 18 December 2014. The service is the executive body exercising state control on usage of immovable historical and cultural monuments (except State Historical-Architecture of "Icheri Sheher" and "Qala" State Historical Ethnographic Reserve) that are under state protection, restoration, reconstruction and protection.

== Institutions included in the Ministry ==
The Ministry includes the following organizations and institutions:

- Cinema Agency of the Republic of Azerbaijan
- All theaters in Azerbaijan
- Azerbaijan State Philharmonic Hall
- Azerbaijan State Symphony Orchestra
- Azerbaijan State Song and Dance Ensemble
- Azerbaijan State Dance Ensemble
- Azerbaijan State Chamber Orchestra
- Azerbaijan State Choir Chapel
- Azerbaijan national Children's Philharmonic
- Heydar Aliyev Palace
- Baku State Circus
- International Mugham Center of Azerbaijan
- Rashid Behbudov State Song Theatre
- Gaya Quartet
- Ganja State Philharmonic Hall
- Goy-Gol State Song and Dance Ensemble
- Azerbaijan State Orchestra of Folk Instruments
- National Library of Azerbaijan
- The Jafar Jabbarly Youth Library of Republic
- Children's Library named after Firidun bey Kocharli
- Republican Library for the Blind and Visually Impaired
- 11 Centralized Library System
- All museums in Azerbaijan
- Baku Zoo

== Criticism ==
In a book published in 2007 by the ministry and endorsed by the Azerbaijan National Academy of Sciences, the country of Armenia is presented as "Western Azerbaijan." It depicts all monuments in Armenia as "Turkic", "Turkish" or "Armenian-Turkish", such as the Roman Temple of Garni being connected to the "ancient Gargar Turks", and the Etchmiadzin Cathedral as a "7th-century Armenian-Turkish Christian temple". According to the scholar and sociologist Hratch Tchilingirian, "this kind of re-writing of "history" is based solely on sources produced by Azerbaijani authors, notably prominent academician and national figure Ziya Buniyatov, whom President Heydar Aliyev described as "the constructor of our identity and self-consciousness". This constructed narrative is echoed in the political discourse of President Aliyev and is woven into state policies, diplomacy, public relations, identity construction and, critically, in the construction of extreme anti-Armenianism in Azerbaijan."

== See also ==
- Cabinet of Azerbaijan
- Tourism in Azerbaijan
- Culture of Azerbaijan
- Architecture of Azerbaijan
