= List of military awards and decorations of the international military intervention against the Islamic State =

This is a list of military awards and decorations of the international military intervention against ISIL.

== International ==
=== International fighters and volunteers with the SDF, YPG and YPJ ===
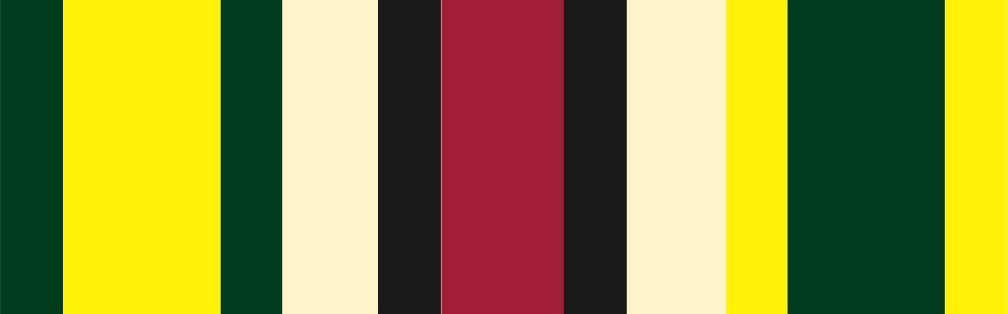
- The Medal for the Martyrs

=== Multinational Force and Observers ===
- Multinational Force and Observers Director General's Award
- Multinational Force and Observers Medal
- Multinational Force and Observers Civilian Medal

=== North Atlantic Treaty Organisation ===
- NATO Non-article 5 medal for Operation Resolute Support

=== United Nations ===
- United Nations Medal for the United Nations Truce Supervision Organization
- United Nations Medal for the United Nations Supervision Mission in Syria

== Australia ==
- Australian Service Medal with Sinai clasp
- Australian Operational Service Medal – Greater Middle East Operation (AOSM-GMEO)
- Australian Operational Service Medal – Special Operations

== Belgium ==
- Commemorative Medal for Foreign Operations or Missions

== Canada ==
- General Service Medal (GSM) with Expedition ribbon

== Denmark ==
- Defense Medal for International Service, Single Deployment
- Defense Medal for International Service, Syria

== Germany ==
- German Armed Forces Deployment Medal with AF TUR clasp

== Iraq ==
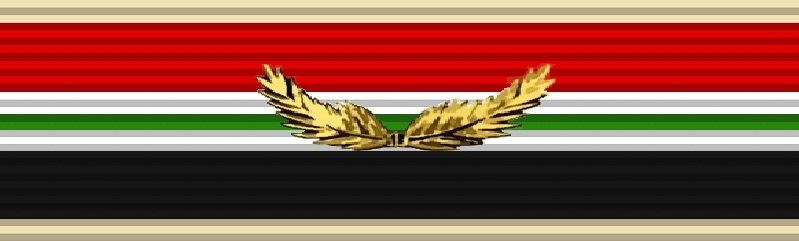
- Iraq Commitment Medal

== New Zealand ==
- New Zealand General Service Medal 2002 (Iraq 2015)
- New Zealand General Service Medal 2002 (Greater Middle East)

== Norway ==
- Medal for Defence Operations Abroad with Iraq ribbon
- Medal for Defence Operations Abroad with Syria ribbon

== Russia ==
- Medal "Participant in Military Operations in Syria"
- Medal "For the Liberation of Palmyra"
- Medal "For the Demining of Palmyra"

== Spain ==
- Medalla de Campaña

== United Kingdom ==
- Operational Service Medal for Afghanistan
- Operational Service Medal Iraq and Syria

== United States ==
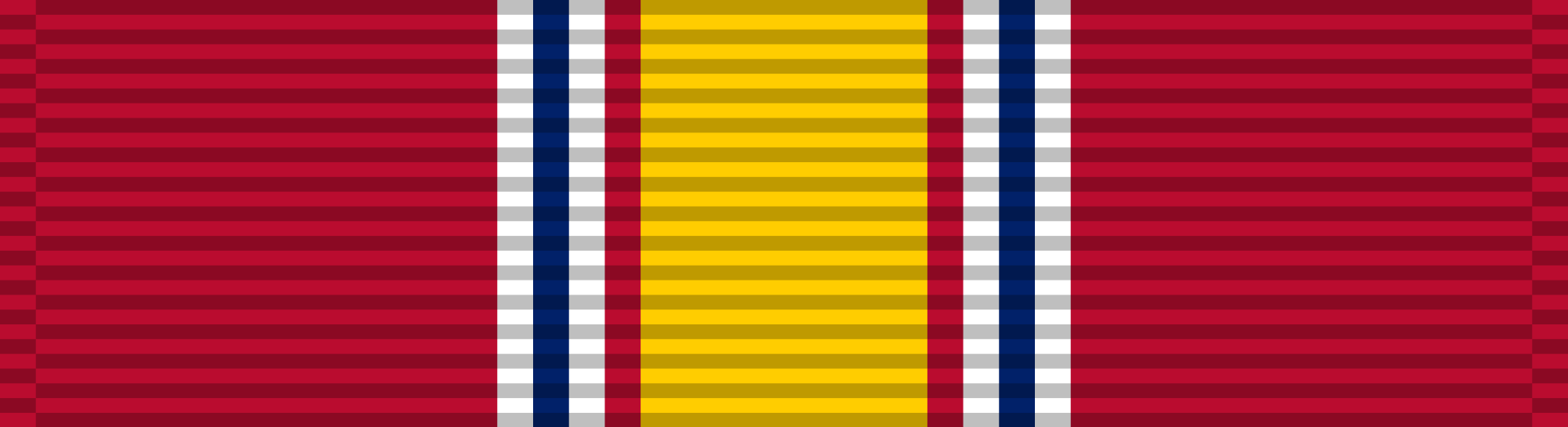
- National Defense Service Medal (NDSM)
- Global War on Terrorism Service Medal (GWOT-SM)
- Afghanistan Campaign Medal (ACM)
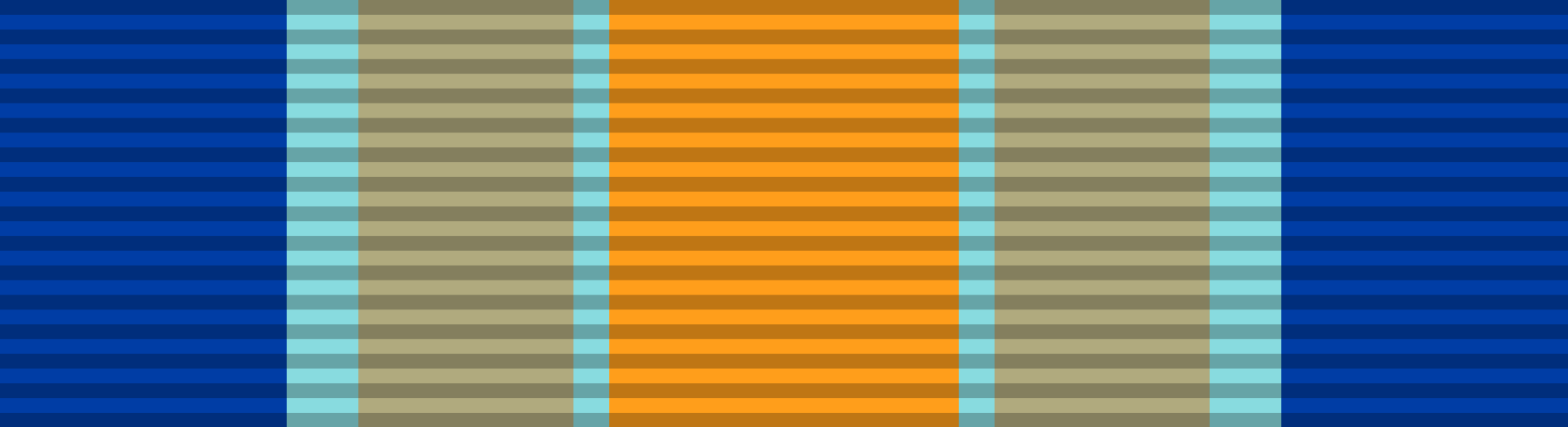
- Inherent Resolve Campaign Medal
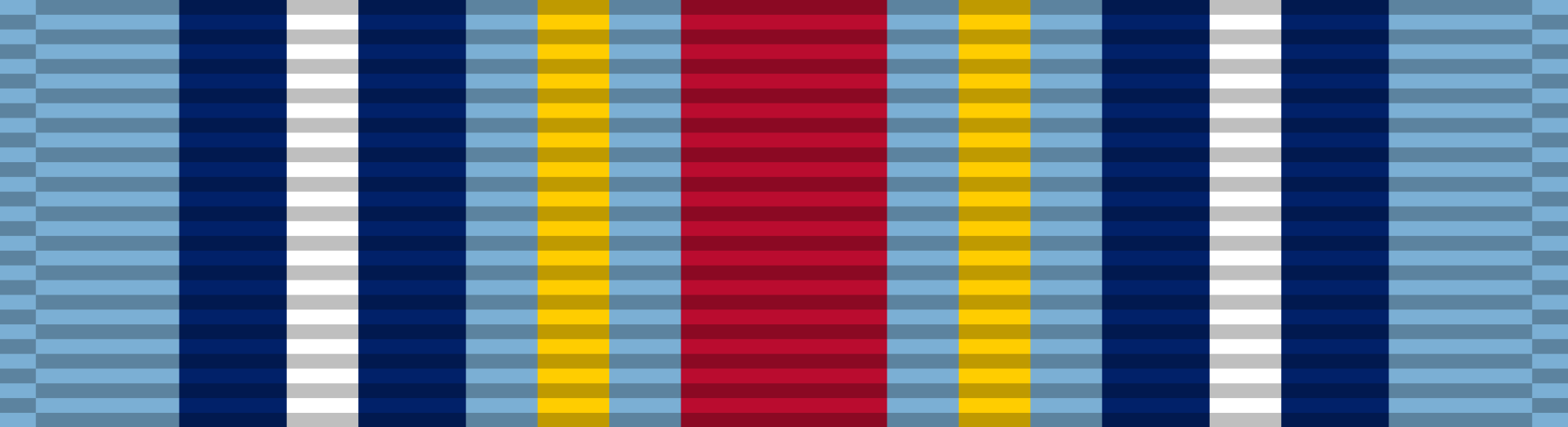
- Global War on Terrorism Expeditionary Medal (GWOT-EM)
