= Augusto Ferrer-Dalmau =

Spanish painter (born 1964)

The Most Excellent Augusto Ferrer-Dalmau OIC OCM GCNM GCMM
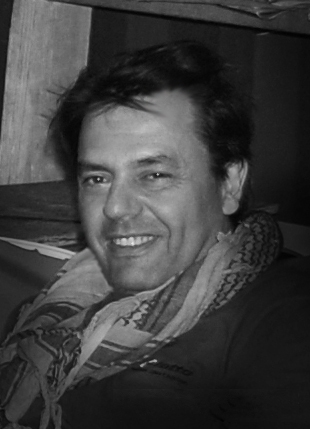
- Born: Augusto Ferrer-Dalmau Nieto; 20 January 1964 (age 62); Barcelona, Spain
- Known for: Painting
- Notable work: Rocroi, the last tercio
- Movement: Hyper realist
- Website: www.ferrerdalmaunoticias.com

Augusto Ferrer-Dalmau Nieto (Barcelona, 20 January 1964) is a Spanish hyperrealist painter who specialises in historical military paintings that portray different eras of the Spanish Armed Forces through hyperrealistic naturalism. On 11 January 2022, he founded the Ferrer-Dalmau Foundation with the aim of promoting defense culture through history and art.

== Biography and work ==
Augusto Ferrer-Dalmau Nieto was born in Barcelona. His family had historical links to the Carlism movement, and his great-uncle, Melchor Ferrer Dalmau, was a Carlist journalist and historian. He studied at St. Ignatius College in Sarriá. At the end of the 1980s he worked as a textile designer, however he also had a passion for oil painting. He also had an interest in military and history, which led him to paint these subjects from a young age. He also wrote a book entitled Batallón Román, although his first works were landscapes and seascapes.

Later, inspired by the work of Antonio López García, he focused on urban environments, painting areas of his native Barcelona. He exhibited in art galleries, receiving positive reviews. This work was later collected in a monograph of the author and in several general books of contemporary art. At the end of the 1990s he decided to specialize in the historical-military theme, producing canvases where the landscape is mixed with military elements such as soldiers and cavalry.

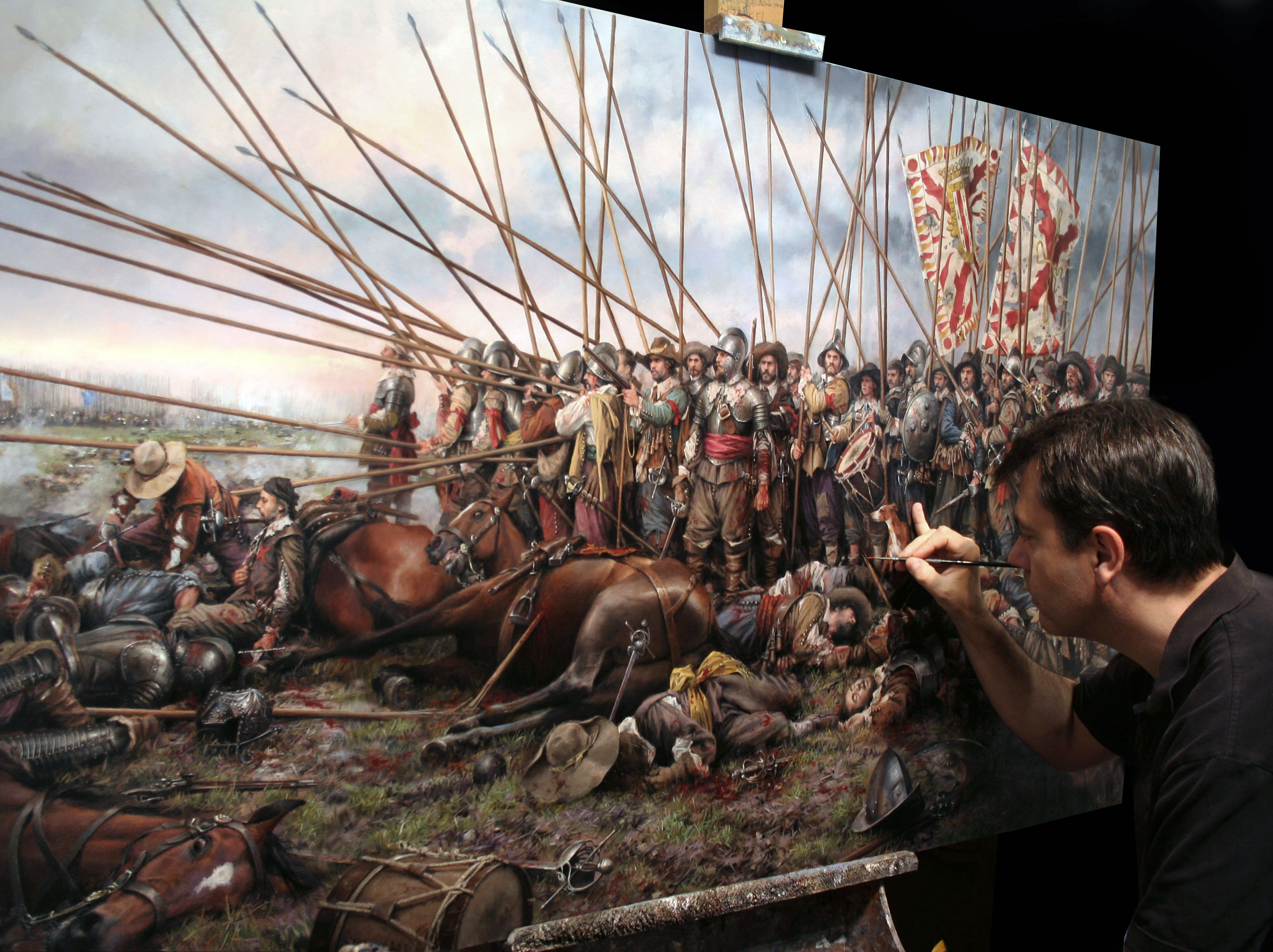
Ferrer Dalmau painting Rocroi, el último tercio (English: Rocroi, the last tercio).

Ferrer-Dalmau has been based in Madrid since 2010, and has collaborated with different publishers, associations and institutions in the recreation of the military history of Spain. Different monographic books on his painting have been published. In 2022 he founded his own magazine named the FFD Magazine, in which he approaches the history of Spain and its people from an artistic and social perspective. His work is managed by the company Historical Outline, and his paintings illustrate numerous books and magazines, especially of history.

Ferrer-Dalmau has spent time in conflict zones in Afghanistan, Iraq, Syria, Mali, Lebanon, Somalia and Djibouti, making sketches, taking notes and painting. He lived with Spanish ISAF troops in 2012, and with the Georgian Armed Forces in the province of Helmand in 2014. He lived alongside the ASPFOR XXXI contingent, at the base of the Parachute Brigade, at Qala i Naw and at the Ricketts Combat Outpost (COP) in Moqur. This was the first time that a Spanish painter travelled abroad alongside the Ministry of Defense of Spain. He is a member of The International Society of War Artists. He made his work La Patrulla (The Patrol) as homage to the Spanish soldiers. In May 2016 he painted the Spanish troops in the mission of Lebanon, and in April 2018 he painted the Spanish Army in the European Union Training Mission in Mali (EUTM-Mali). In September 2018 he travelled to Aleppo with the Army of the Russian Federation, and in November 2019 he painted the Spanish troops in Iraq.

== Art exhibitions ==
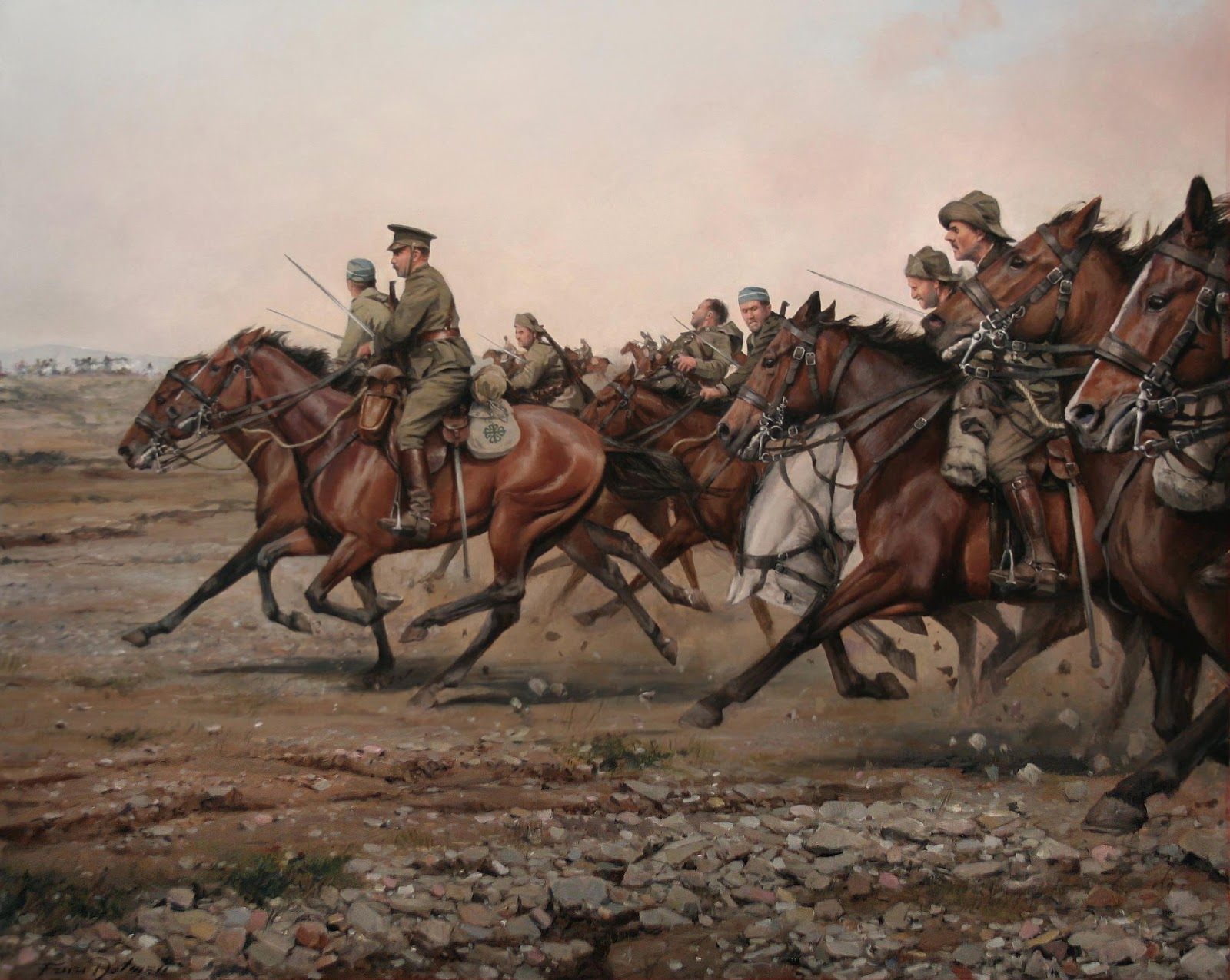
Carga del río Igan por el Regimiento Alcántara (2013).

In addition to private collections, Ferrer-Dalmau's work can be seen at the Museum of the Royal Guard (Royal Palace of El Pardo, Madrid), the Army Museum, the Museum of the General Military Academy (Zaragoza), the Naval Museum of Madrid, the Museum of Intendance (Avila), the Naval Military Academy of Marín (Pontevedra), the Museum of Modern Art of the Republic of Georgia, and the Royal Palace of Valladolid.

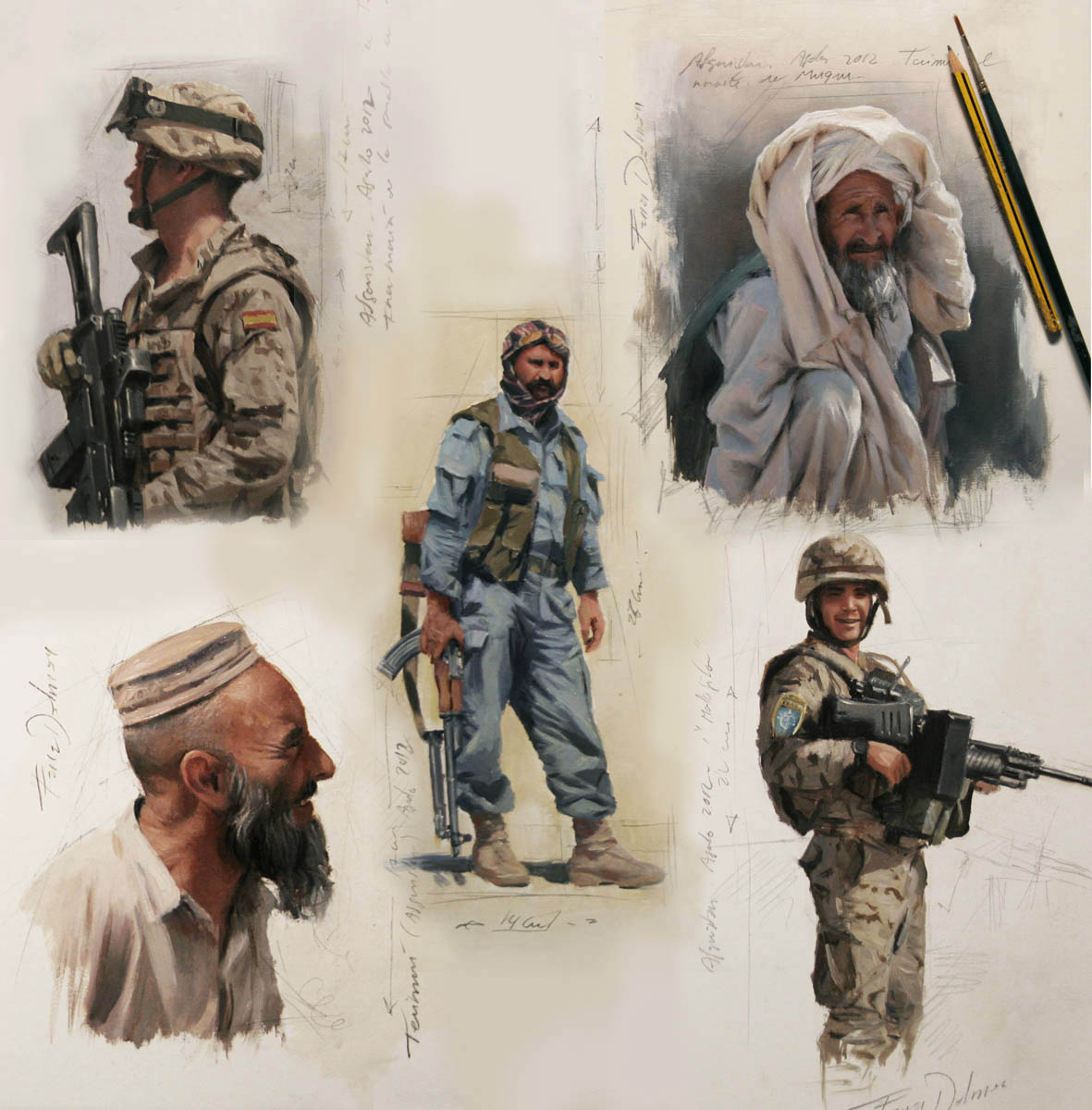
Sketches made by the artist in Afghanistan in August 2012

He has held individual exhibitions at private galleries in Barcelona, Madrid, London, Paris and New York as well as the following institutional centers:

- Army Museum of Toledo
- Palacio de Capitanía
- Royal Palace of Valladolid
- Audience Palace of Soria
- es:Museo Provincial de Pontevedra
- Sant Ferran Castle of Figueras
- Palacio de Buenavista of Madrid
- Palace of the Captaincy of Canarias en Tenerife
- Militar Palace of Las Palmas de Gran Canaria
- Castle of Santa Catalina in Cádiz
- Palace of the Captaincy of Barcelona.
- Palacio de los Concejos of Madrid
- Provincial Palace of Alicante
- Town Hall of Valladolid
- Miramar Palace (San Sebastián)
- Roman Museum Oiasso of Irún
- Palace of the Captaincy of A Coruña
- Palace of the Cigüeñas of Cáceres
- Cultural Centre of Amaia (Irún)
- International Conference on Defense and Security (Georgia)
- Exhibition of the "Camino Español" in Strasbourg, Brussels, Besançon and Breda
- General Command of Ceuta
- Oratory Sant Felipe Neri of Cordova
- Museum of the Battle (Bailen)
- Consistorial House of Valladolid
- Palace of the Captaincy of Badajoz.
- Sant Agustin Cultural Center of El Burgo de Osma
- House of America (Madrid)
- Palace of the Captaincy of Burgos
- Bolduque Church (Holand)
- Saint Barbara Palace (Madrid)
- Santa María la Rica de Alcalá de Henares
- Iberdrola Tower of Bilbao
- Louisiana State Museum» de Nueva Orleans
- Museo Central de las Fuerzas Armadas Moscú
- Museo Nacional de los Inválidos de París

== Honours and awards ==
=== Honours ===
==== National honours ====
- Doctor honoris causa from the CEU San Pablo University.
- Academician of the Royal Academy of Fine Arts of Santa Isabel de Hungría (Seville).
- Gold Medal of Merit in the Fine Arts.

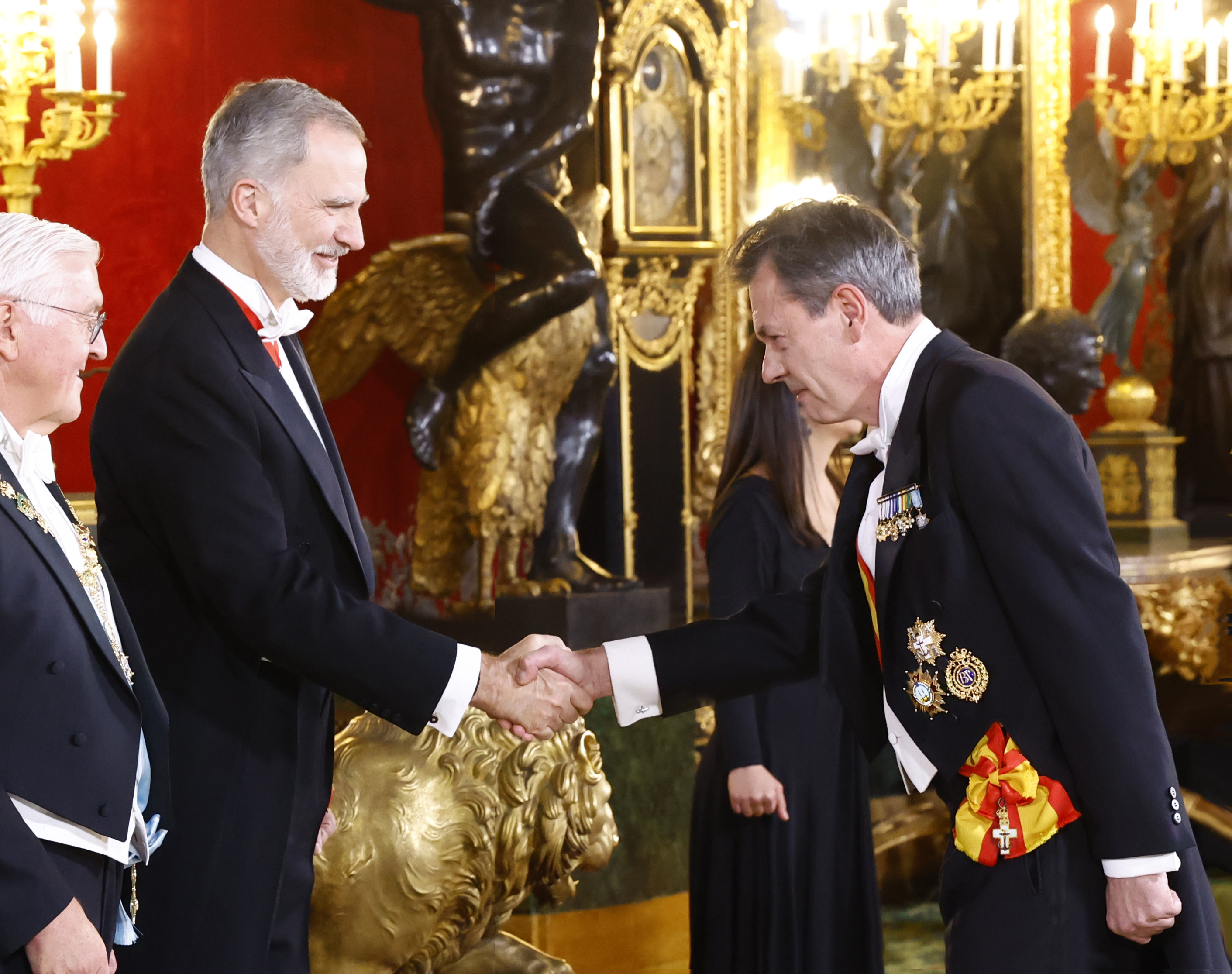
H.M. King Felipe VI receives the greeting of Mr. Augusto Ferrer-Dalmau during the State Visit gala dinner offered to H.E. the President of the Federal Republic of Germany.

- Commander by Number of the Order of Isabella the Catholic.
- Grand Cross of the Order of Military Merit (with white decoration).
- Grand Cross of the Order of Naval Merit (with white decoration).
- Grand Cross of the Order of Merit of the Civil Guard.
- Grand Cross of the Fidelity Cross.
- Commander of the Order of Civil Merit.
- Silver Cross of the Order of Merit of the Civil Guard Corps.
- Cross of the Order of Naval Merit (with white decoration).
- Cross of the Order of Police Merit (with white decoration).
- Medal of Merit of Civil Defence (with white decoration).
- Medal of the Century of the Virgen del Pilar as patron of the Civil Guard.
- Medal of the V Century of Saint Barbara as patron of the Artillery Weapon.
- Master of Honor of the Chivalry of San Fernando.
- Grand Cross of the Order of the Second of May.
- Madrid Gold Medal.
- Grand Cross of the Imperial Order of Charles V.
- Honorary Civil Guard.

==== Foreign honours ====
- NATO Medal for International Security Assistance Force. (NATO)
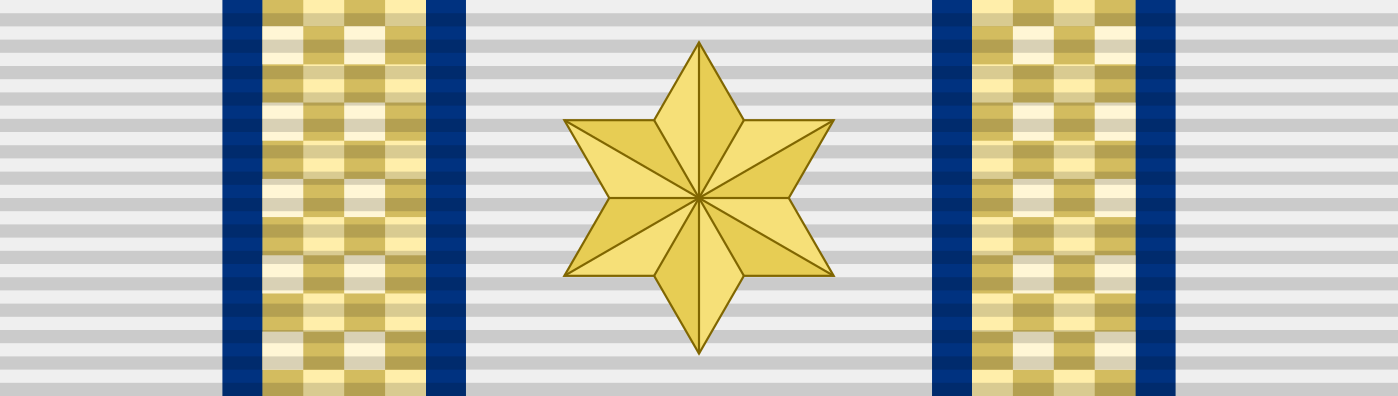
- Grand Star Serge Lazareff Prize. (NATO)
- Medal For International Cooperation Ministry of Foreign Affairs . (Russia)
- Medal for merits in the Fight Against International Terrorism. (Russia)
- Medal For International Cooperation the Ministry of Defense (Russia)
- General Kvinitadze Medal. ( (Georgia (country)) Georgia)

=== Awards ===
==== National awards ====
- Ambassador for "Marca Ejército" (Spanish Army Brand).
- Academician of the Royal Academy of Saint Romualdo of Sciences, Letters and Arts (Cadiz).
- Academician of the Academy of Military Arts and Sciences.
- Academic numerary of the Diplomacy Academy of the Kingdom of Spain.
- Merit Cross of the Royal Association of Hidalgos of Spain.
- Sabino Fernández Campo ABC y BBVA Awards.
- Lancer of Honor of the Cavalry Regiment "Spain".
- Lancer of Honor of the Cavalry Regiment "Farnesio".
- Cavalier Almogávar Paratrooper of Honor.
- Armored Soldier of Honor of the Armored Brigade Guadarrama XII.
- Honorary Halberdier (Alabardero) of the Spanish Royal Guard.
- Honorary Mountain Hunter of the Mountain Cavalry Regiment "America" No. 66.
- Honorary Mountain Hunter of the Armored Cavalry Regiment "Alcántara" No. 10.
- Honorary Arquebusier of Light Infantry Regiment 'Soria' No. 9.
- Honorary Member of the Infantry Regiment Asturias.
- Honorary soldier of the RT 22
- Honorary Húsar of Regiment Pavia.
- Honorary Gunner of the RACA20.
- Ferrer-Dalmau Awards of the Diplomacy Academy of the Kingdom of Spain.
- Medal of the 350 Anniversary of the Asturias Infantry Regiment.

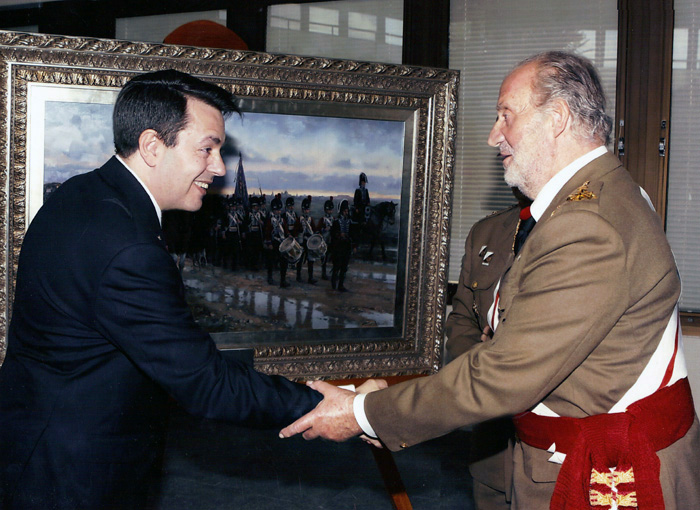
H.M. King Juan Carlos congratulating Ferrer-Dalmau in 2010 for his work to commemorate the III Centenary of the creation of the Arma de Ingenieros (Museum of the Engineers Academy, Madrid).

- Commander of the Duque of Ahumada NCO Association.
- Partner of Honor of "Círculo Ahumada de la Guardia Civil".
- Partner of Honor of "Los Sitios de Zaragoza".
- Partner of Honor of the "Círculo de Amigos de las Fuerzas Armadas".
- Regular of Honor of G. R. Melilla 52.
- Azor Award of the Infantry Brigade Airborne 'Galicia' VII.
- Animosus Dux of the Mechanized Infantry Brigade 'Extremadura' XI.
- Cross of Burgundy of the Spanish Heraldic Society.
- National prize Living Culture to the plastic arts.
- "Mariblanca" Prize of the House of Madrid in Barcelona.
- "Racimo" Painting Prize 2016.
- Diploma of the General Inspectorate of the Army.
- "Capitán de Galeones" Award of the "Fundación Puerta de América".

==== Foreign awards ====
- Member of The International Society of War Artists.
- Gold Medal and brilliants of the Art Priest.

=== Gallery ===
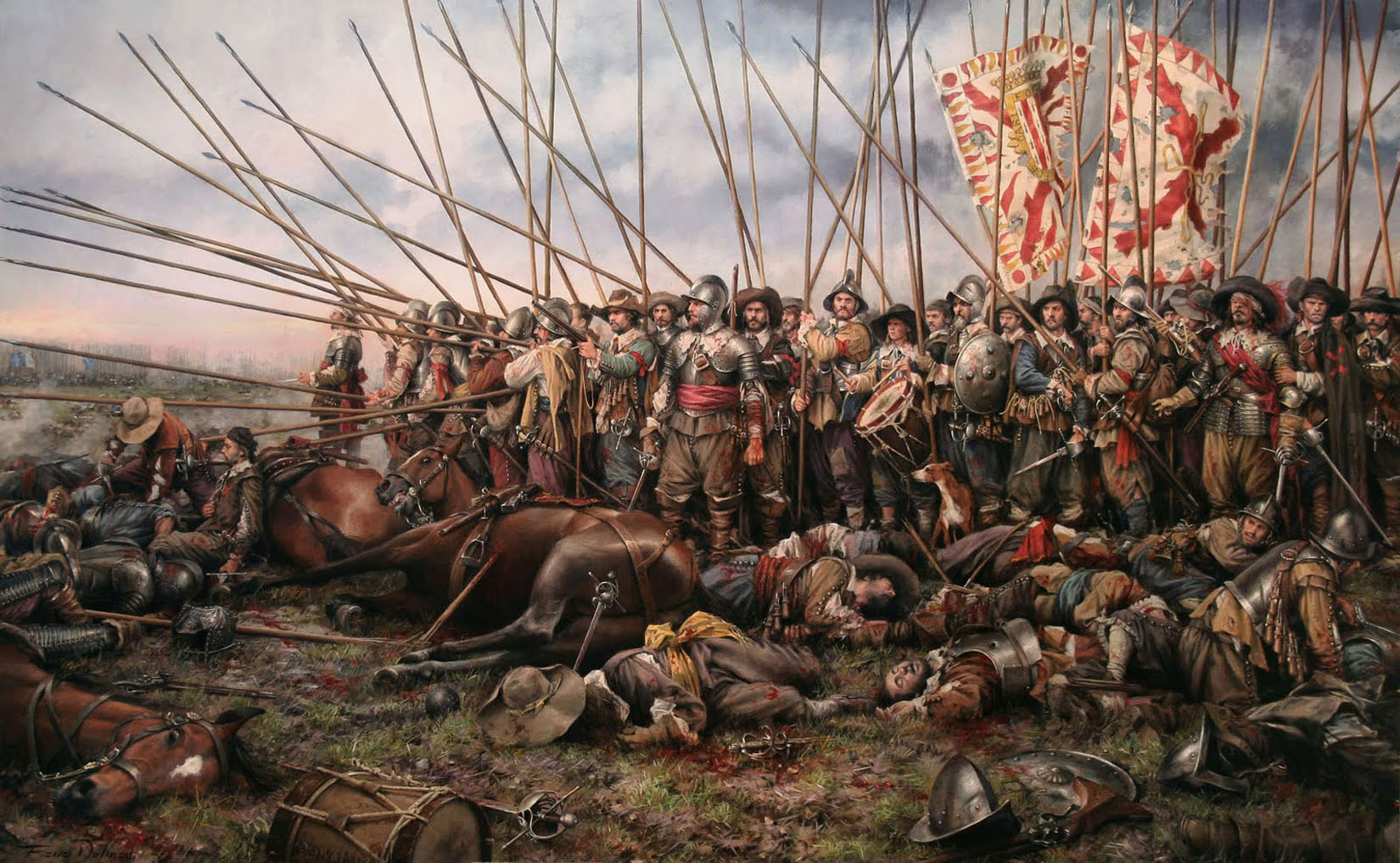
La batalla de Rocroi (2011).

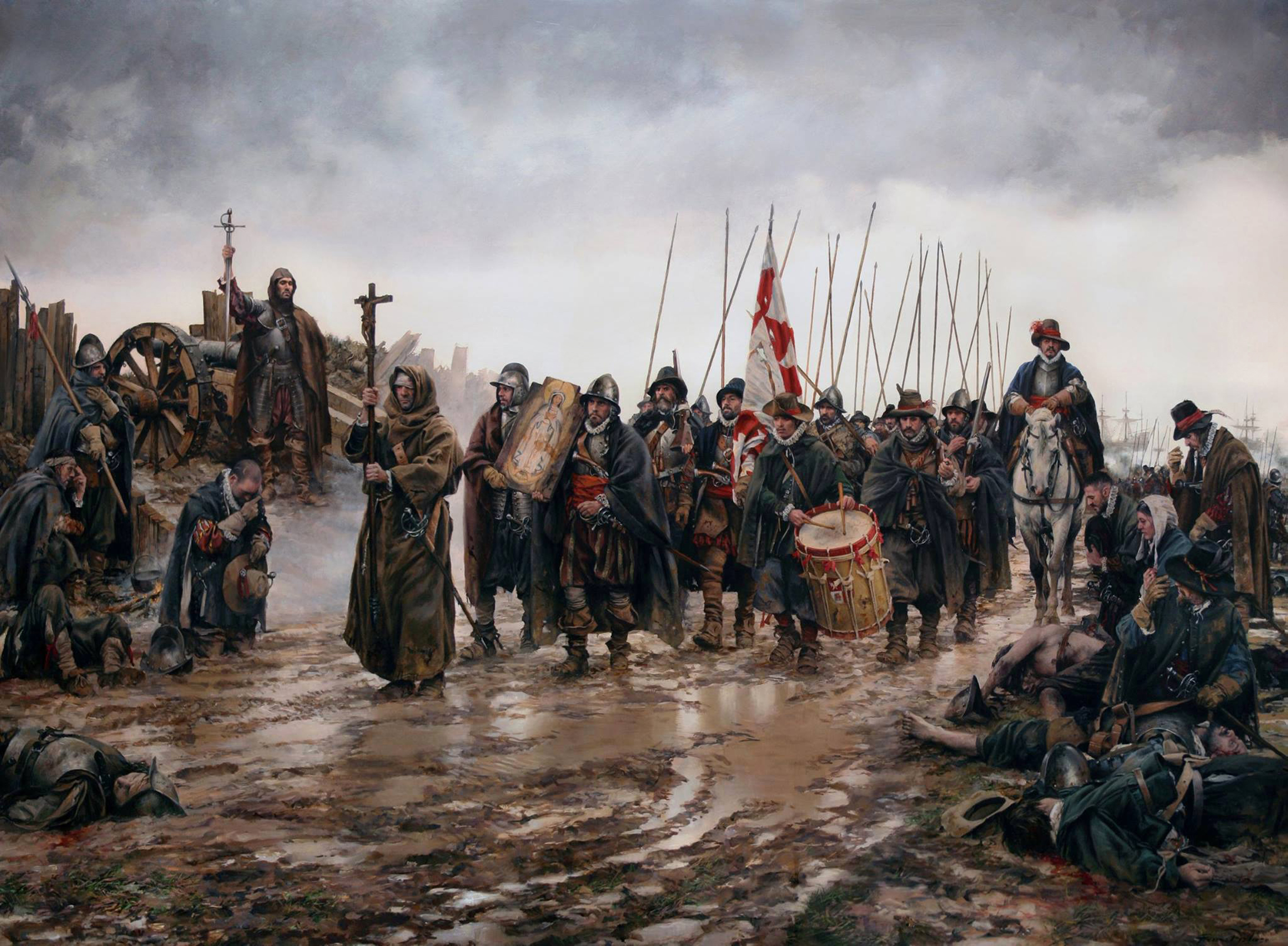
El milagro de Empel (2015).

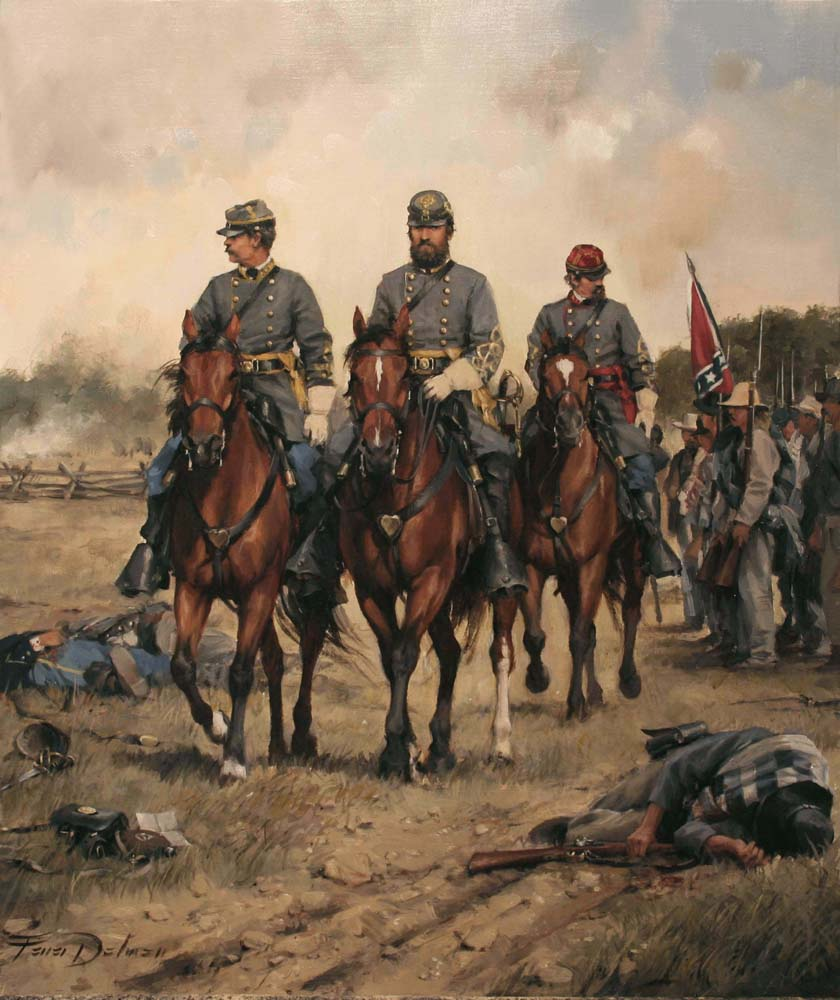
General Jackson (2011)

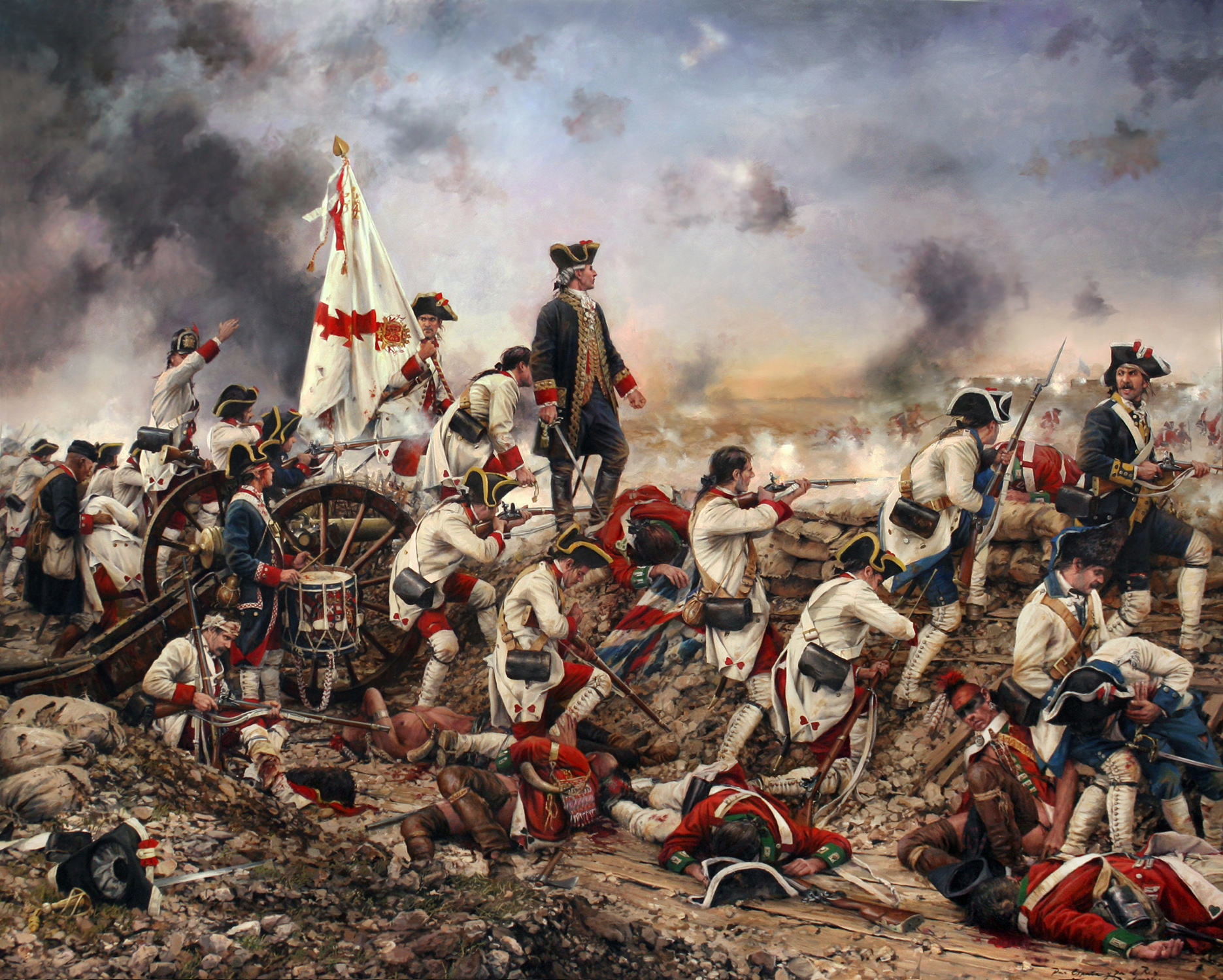
For Spain and for the King, Galvez in America (2016)

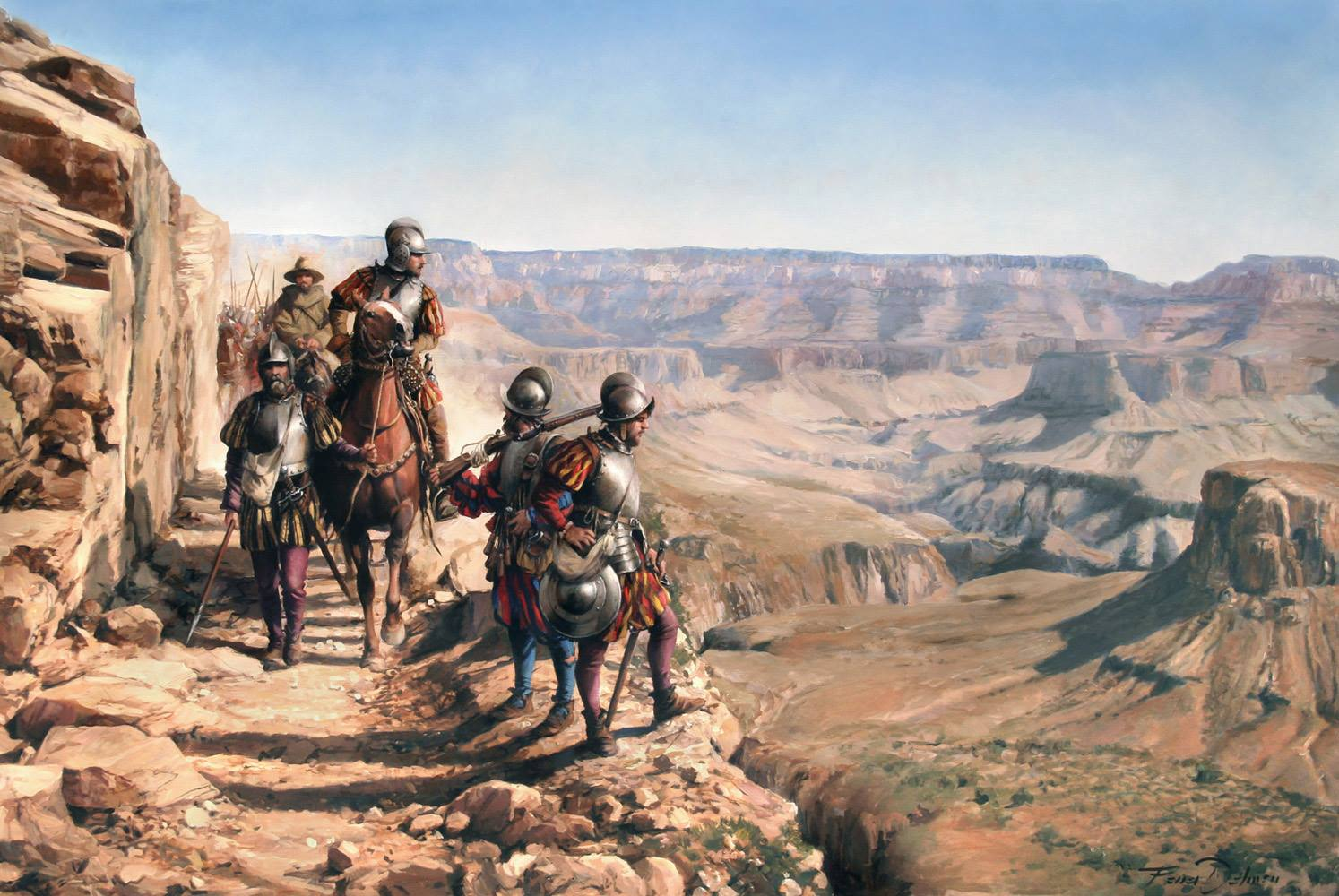
La conquista del Colorado

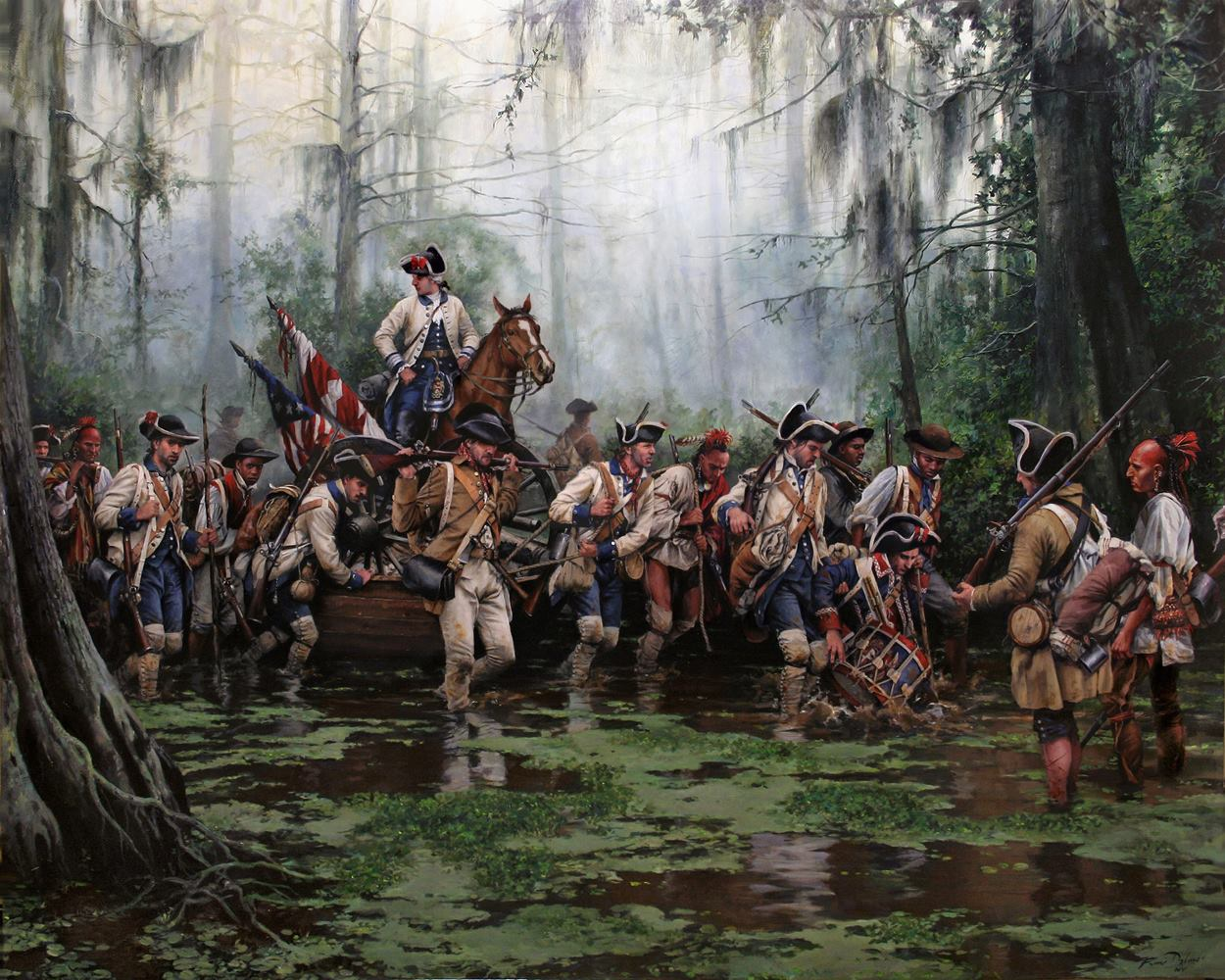
La Marcha de Galvez.
