= International decoration =

Military award

An international decoration is a military award which is not bestowed by a particular country, but rather by an international organization such as the United Nations or NATO. Such awards are normally issued as attendance medals, for participation in various international military operations, and not for specific acts of heroism, bravery or merit.

The following is a list of the most commonly recognized international military decorations:

== United Nations ==
- UNKorea United Nations Korea Medal
- UNTSO – United Nations Truce Supervision Organization – Medal
- UNOGIL – Observation Group in Lebanon
- UNMOGIP – Military Observer Group in India and Pakistan
- UNOC – Congo
- UNTEA – Temporary Executive Authority
- UNYOM – Yemen Observer Mission
- UNFICYP – Cyprus
- UNEFME – Emergency Force, Middle East – also known as UNEF II
- UNDOF – Disengagement Observer Force
- UNIFIL – Interim Force in Lebanon
- UNIIMOG – Iran/Iraq Military Observers Group
- UNTAG – Transition Assistance Group
- ONUCA – Observer Group in Central America
- UNIKOM – Iraq-Kuwait Observation Mission
- UNAVEM – Angola Verification Mission I, II & III
- MINURSO – Mission for the Referendum in Western Sahara
- ONUSAL – Observer Mission in El Salvador
- UNPROFOR – Protection Force
- UNMOP – Mission of Observers in Prevlaka
- UNTAES – Transitional Admin for Eastern Slavonia, Baranja & West Sirmium
- MINUGUA – Mision de las Naciones Unidas en Guatemala
- MINURCA – Verification Mission in the Central African Republic
- UNMIK – Mission in Kosovo
- UNOMSIL – Observer Mission In Sierra Leone
- UNPREDEP – Preventive Deployment Force
- UNMONUC – Congo 2000 –
- UNMEE – Mission in Ethiopia and Eritrea
- UNSSM – Special Service Medal
- UNHQ – Headquarters New York
- UNMIS – Mission in Sudan
- UNPSG – Police Support Group
- UNTAET – Transitional Administration In East Timor
- UNAMET – Assistance Mission East Timor
- UNMISET – Mission of Support in East Timor
- UNONUB – Operation in Burundi
- UNMIT – Mission in Timor
- UNAMID – African Union Mission in Darfur
- MINURCAT – Mission in the Central African Republic and Chad
- MONUSCO – United Nations Organization Stabilization Mission in the Democratic Republic of the Congo
- UNISFA – United Nations Interim Security Force for Abyei
- UNMISS – United Nations Mission in South Sudan

== North Atlantic Treaty Organization ==
- NATO Meritorious Service Medal
- Yugoslavia service medal
- Kosovo service
- Macedonia Medal
- Operation Eagle Assist service (Article 5)
- Operation Active Endeavor service (Article 5)
- Operations in the Balkans
- Afghanistan service (Non-Article 5)
- Serge Lazareff Prize

== European Union ==
- Western European Union Mission Service Medal
- European Community Monitor Mission Medal for Yugoslavia
- European Union Monitoring Mission Medal for Yugoslavia
- Eurofor – European Force Service Medal
- European Police College – Civil Crisis Management
- Common Security and Defence Policy Service Medal (CSDP), for Staff Service (Always worn with operation clasp)
- CSDP Medal for the Police Mission in Bosnia and Herzegovina (EUPM)
- CSDP Medal for EUFOR Concordia
- CSDP Medal for Operation Artemis
- CSDP Medal for the Police Mission in the former Yugoslav Republic of Macedonia (EUPOL Proxima)
- CSDP Medal for EUFOR Althea
- CSDP Medal for the Reform Mission in the Democratic Republic of the Congo (EUSEC RD Congo)
- CSDP Medal for AMIS EU Supporting Action
- CSDP Medal for the Border Assistance Mission for the Rafah Crossing Point (EUBAM Rafah)
- CSDP Medal for the Coordinating Office for Palestinian Police Support (EUPOL COPPS)
- CSDP Medal for EUFOR RD Congo
- CSDP Medal for the Police Mission to Afghanistan (EUPOL Afghanistan)
- CSDP Medal for the Bridging Operation in Chad and the Central African Republic (EUFOR Tchad/RCA)
- CSDP Medal for EU Naval Operation Atalanta
- CSDP Medal for Rule of Law Mission in Kosovo (EULEX Kosovo)
- European Union Somalia Training Mission (EUTM Somalia)
- European Union Regional Maritime Capacity Building for the Horn of Africa and the Western Indian Ocean (EUCAP NESTOR), 16 July 2012 –
- EUTM Mali, January 2013–
- European Union Aviation Security Mission in South Sudan (EUAVSEC SOUTH SUDAN), February 2013 – January 2014
- EUFOR RCA, April 2014–
- CSDP EUTM MALI Medal for Extraordinary Meritorious Service ribbon bar

== International Control Commission ==
- International Commission for Supervision and Control Medal

== International Commission of Control and Supervision ==
- International Commission of Control and Supervision Medal (first version)
- International Commission of Control and Supervision Medal (second version)

== Organization of American States ==
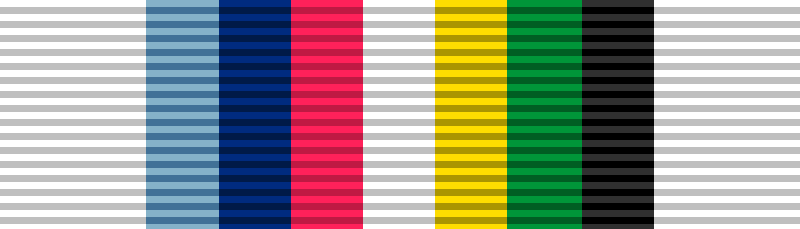
- Inter-American Peace Force Medal
- Inter-American Defense Board Medal

== System of Cooperation Among the American Air Forces ==
- SICOFAA Legion of Merit Gentleman
- SICOFAA Legion of Merit Officer
- SICOFAA Legion of Merit Grand Cross

== Multinational Force and Observers ==
- Multinational Force & Observers Medal
- Multinational Force and Observers Civilian Medal
- Multinational Force and Observers Director General's Award
