= Inter-American Defense Board Medal =

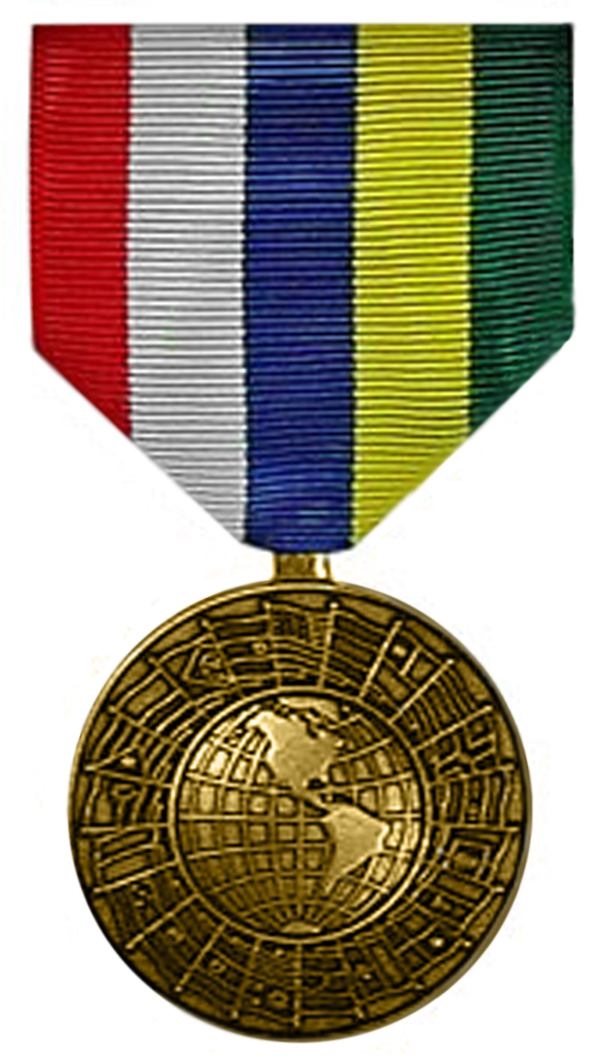
- The Inter-American Defense Board Medal
- Type: International Military Award
- Awarded for: Serving a tour of duty or serve on staff or as an instructor at the Inter-American Defense College
- Presented by: the Organization of American States
- Eligibility: Any soldier of a member nation's uniformed services who serves a tour of duty with the Inter-American Defense Board
- Status: Active
- Established: December 11, 1945
- Inter-American Defense Board Ribbon

The Inter-American Defense Board Medal is an international military award which was created on December 11, 1945, by the 91st session of the Inter-American Defense Board, a Pan-American defense group devoted to the security of the member countries of the Organization of American States.

The Inter-American Defense Board Medal is awarded to any military officer, serving in a member nation of the Organization of American States, who completes a tour of service with the Inter-American Defense Board. The award is also presented to military personnel who serve on the staff of the IADB Chairman, Secretariat, or for those who complete instructor tours at the Inter-American Defense College.

The Inter-American Defense Board Medal is a one-time decoration but may be upgraded with 3/16 inch silver and gold stars depending on the length of time an individual serves with the Inter-American Defense Board. A silver service star or bar is awarded for one year of service; a gold service star or bar for two; two gold stars or bars for between three years and five; and three gold stars or bars for more than five years service. U.S. military personnel who have been awarded the Inter-American Defense Board Medal and ribbon may wear them when attending meetings, ceremonies, or other functions where Latin American members of the Board are present.

== Usage with national military regalia of the member states ==
=== United States ===
In the United States, the Inter-American Defense Board Medal was only recognized as a military award on May 12, 1981. Since that time, the Inter-American Defense Board Medal had been approved for wear on United States military uniforms and will follow U.S. Military decorations and before military awards of individual foreign countries.

== Other similar awards ==
Similar international military awards include the NATO Medal, United Nations Medal, United Nations Service Medal, and the Multinational Force and Observers Medal.
