= International Commission for Supervision and Control Medal =

- Ribbon of the medal
- Type: Service Award
- Awarded for: 90 days of service
- Presented by: International Commission for Supervision and Control (ICSC)
- Eligibility: Personnel who served with the ICSC
- Status: No longer awarded
- Established: 1954
- Final award: 1973

Order of Wear
- Next (higher): Varies by country
- Next (lower): Varies by country
- Related: International Commission of Control and Supervision Medal

The International Commission for Supervision and Control Medal is an international service medal awarded to personnel from the three countries that make up the International Commission for Supervision and Control (ICSC). The ICSC was born from the Geneva Agreements of 1954, which ended the First Indochina War. The medal was awarded for 90 days of cumulative service with the ICSC between 1954 and 1974.

== Criteria ==
Personnel of ICSC member nations served in various locations throughout Laos, Vietnam, and Cambodia investigating compliance and monitoring enforcement of the peace accords. The commission's purpose was to supervise the cease-fire, the withdrawal of French troops, the repatriation of military and civilian prisoners, and facilitating the return of refugees to their homes. The commission was made up of personnel from Canada, Poland, and India. The International Commission for Control and Supervision Medal was awarded for 90 days of cumulative service between 7 August 1954 to 15 June 1974.

== Description ==
The International Commission for Supervision and Control Medal is a circular bronze medal 34 mm (1.3 in) with a dark antiqued finish. The medal was made by Barton's Jewelers of Bangalore, India. The obverse bears the design of the ICSC, the crossed flags of Canada and Poland with the Emblem of India between the flags. A dove is superimposed over the crossed poles of the flags. Around the edge are the words INTERNATIONAL COMMISSION FOR SUPERVISION AND CONTROL with the word PEACE at the base. The reverse of the medal bears a map of French Indochina with the borders of the individual countries of Laos, Cambodia, and Vietnam with each country's name.

The medal is suspended from a straight bar with a bamboo shoot motif. It is attached to the medal by means of welded floral device. The medal hangs from a ribbon 32 mm (1.3 in) wide consisting of three equal stripes of dark green, white, and red.

The recipients' names and ranks were impressed on the edge in block capital letters, and then filled in with white paint.

== Order of wear ==
Country	Preceding	Following
(Canada) Canada; Order of precedence	NATO Medal for Operation Unified Protector	International Commission of Control and Supervision Medal
