= International Commission of Control and Supervision Medal =

International Commission of Control and Supervision Service Medal
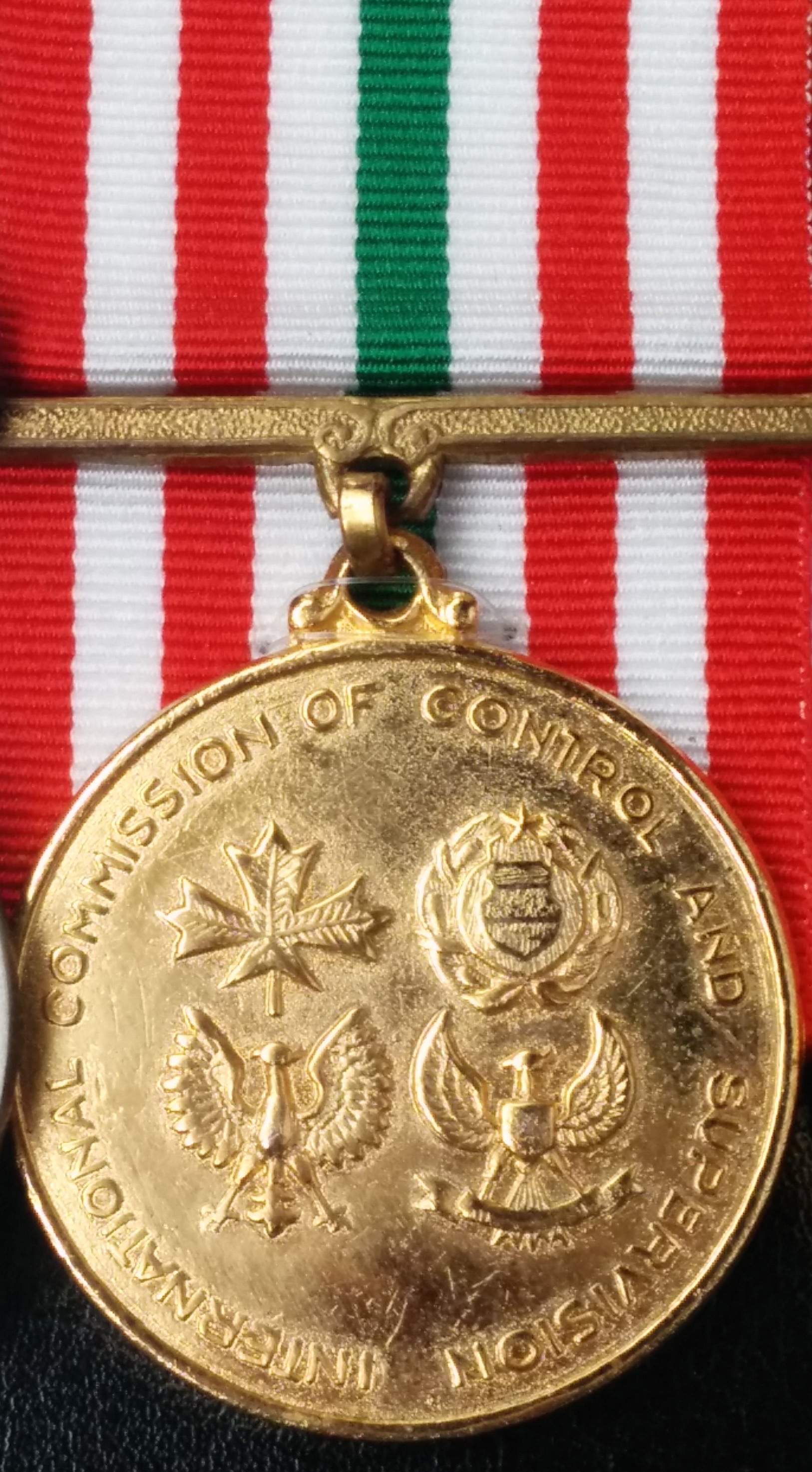
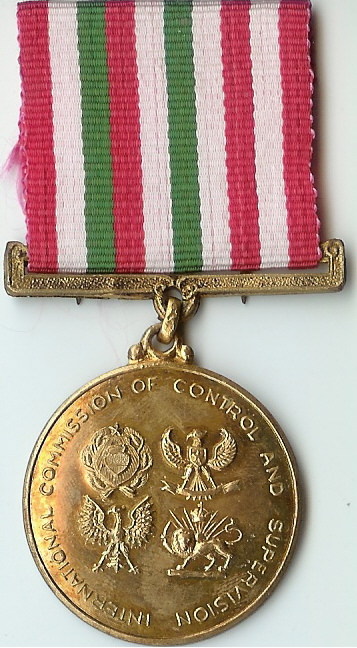
- First version (left) and final version of the ICCS Medal. The first version has a Canadian maple leaf, the Coat of arms of the People's Republic of Hungary, the People's Republic of Poland coat of arms, and the Coat of arms of Indonesia, while the final version retains the Hungarian, Indonesian, and Polish coat of arms but replaces the Maple Leaf with the Lion and Sun emblem of Iran.
- Type: Service medal
- Awarded for: 90 days of service
- Presented by: International Commission of Control and Supervision (ICCS)
- Eligibility: Personnel who served with the ICCS
- Status: No longer awarded
- Established: 1973
- Final award: 1975
- First ribbon during the service of Canada, Hungary, Poland, and Indonesia Second ribbon during the service of Hungary, Indonesia, Poland, and Iran

Order of Wear
- Next (higher): Varies by country
- Next (lower): Varies by country
- Related: International Commission for Supervision and Control Medal

The International Commission of Control and Supervision Medal is a service medal awarded to personnel from the four countries that made up the International Commission of Control and Supervision (ICCS). The ICCS was established by the Paris Peace Accords in 1973 to supervise the cease-fire, the withdrawal of troops, the dismantlement of military bases, the activity at ports of entry, and the return of captured military personnel and foreign civilians in Vietnam. It was to report on the implementation, or violation, of the Peace Agreement and Protocols. Initially made up of personnel from Canada, Hungary, Indonesia, and Poland, the Canadians withdrew in July 1973 being replaced by personnel from Iran. The work of the ICCS continued until the April 1975 Fall of Saigon.

== Criteria ==
Personnel of ICCS member nations served in various locations throughout Vietnam investigating compliance and monitoring enforcement of the peace accords. The commission also oversaw the return of military prisoners of war and civilian political detainees. The International Commission of Control and Supervision Medal was awarded for 90 days of cumulative service between 28 January 1973 to 30 April 1975.

== Appearance ==
The International Commission of Control and Supervision Medal is a circular medal made of gilt metal 36 mm (1.4 in)) in diameter. The obverse depicts symbols of the four contributing nations: a Canadian maple leaf and the Lion and Sun emblem of Iran, the Coat of ams of the People's Republic of Hungary, the People's Republic of Poland coat of arms, and the Coat of arms of Indonesia. Initially Canada was represented on the medal but after the country left the ICCS in July 1973, then the Iranian emblem replaced the Maple Leaf until April 1975, when the medal was no longer awarded to relevant personnel after the Fall of Saigon. Around the edge are the words: INTERNATIONAL COMMISSION OF CONTROL AND SUPERVISION. The reverse bears the inscription in three lines SERVICE VIETNAM 27-1-73 surrounded by a laurel wreath.

The medal hangs from a ring suspension that is attached to a thin metal bar with a laurel pattern. The ribbon of the medal is nine equal stripes of red, white, red, white, green, white, red, white, and red. After Canada left the ICCS in July 1973 and was replaced by Iran, the ribbon was modified to be ten equal stripes of red, white, green, red, white, green, white, red, white, and red.

In the 1990s a version was made for Canadian civilians who did not receive the original 1973 medal. The civilian version was of a higher quality with a thicker planchet and a solid straight bar suspender with claw attachment.

== Order of wear ==
Country	Preceding	Following
(Canada) Canada; Order of precedence	International Commission for Supervision and Control Medal	Multinational Force and Observers Medal

== See also ==
- International decoration
