= Ferrer-Dalmau Foundation =

Spanish non-profit foundation

Ferrer-Dalmau Art and History Foundation
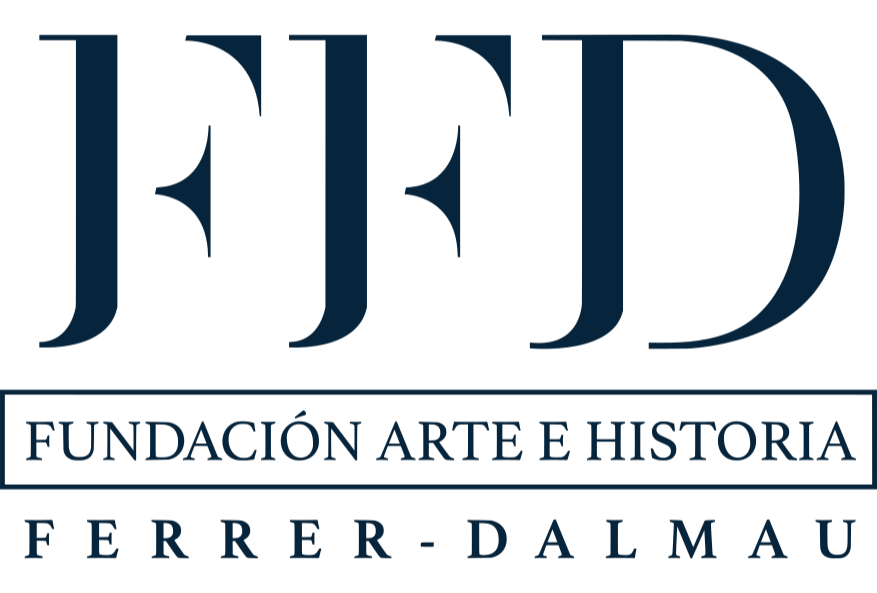
- Founded: 30 June 2021
- Founder: Augusto Ferrer-Dalmau
- Type: Non-governmental organization
- Headquarters: Madrid, Spain
- Region served: Culture
- President: H.R.H. the Duke of Calabria
- First Deputy President: General of the Army; Fernando Alejandre Martínez
- Second Deputy President: Ángel Soria Vaquerizo (Grupo Torre Rioja)
- Director: Navy Ensign; Alejandro Ferrer-Dalmau Socías
- Website: www.fundacionferrerdalmau.es

The Ferrer-Dalmau Art and History Foundation (FFD), better known as the Ferrer-Dalmau Foundation, is a Spanish non-profit foundation founded on June 30, 2021 by the Spanish painter and academic Augusto Ferrer-Dalmau, known as the Painter of Battles. Its purpose is the dissemination, training and enhancement of the historical, artistic and cultural resources of Spain by carrying out activities such as workshops, exhibitions, forums, etc. To fulfill this task, different arts are used, such as painting, sculpture, architecture, literature, comics, music or cinema, among others.

== Mission ==
According to its founder, Augusto Ferrer-Dalmau Nieto, the FFD was created to be able to cover university teaching, occupational training and cultural dissemination of Spain's historical legacy in a single project based mainly on two models:

- The tradition of European Painting Schools: craft workshops that were grouped in streets and neighborhoods whose knowledge was preserved and transmitted directly between these workshops between generations. The result was a large collection of illustrations, prints, engravings, bindings, etc. of great influence between the Middle Ages and the Renaissance. In the 18th century there was a great crisis caused by enlightened reformism, but in the 19th century in Spain a rise of History Painting as a specific genre was generated, touching on themes such as the Spanish Empire, the War of Independence, etc. The objective of the FFD is to try to recover that artisanal and didactic spirit of painting focused on History.
- The Grekóv Workshop: created in the Soviet Union to bring together painters and sculptors of battles around the Russian painter Grekóv. The FFD wants to follow these steps by maintaining craftsmanship and various techniques to use them in new artistic creations

Both models form the Ferrer-Dalmau Workshop of Historical Artists of Painting, Sculpture and History, which focuses on the training of new creators, researchers and restorers of this type of art.

== Board of trustees ==
The board of trustees of the Ferrer-Dalmau Foundation currently consists of 20 trustees, among which are:

- His Royal Highness Prince Pedro of Bourbon-Two Sicilies, Duke of Calabria, President of the Royal Council of the Spanish Military Orders of Chivalry since 2014. As current Head of the Royal House of Bourbon-Two Sicilies, he is the Sovereign and Grand Master of the Sacred and Military Constantinian Order of Saint George and of the Illustrious Royal Order of Saint Januarius.
- His Excellency General of the Army Fernando Alejandre Martínez, Chief of the Defence Staff of Spain from 2017 to 2020, member in the Assembly of the Royal and Military Order of Saint Hermenegild and consultant in leading companies in the security and defense sector.
- The Most Excellent Manuel Marchena Gómez. Doctor of Law, he has been the President of the Second Chamber, for Criminal Law, of the Supreme Court of Spain since 2014, of which he has been a magistrate since 2007, until which time he exercised his career as a prosecutor, becoming a courtroom prosecutor of the Supreme Court of Spain, as well as chief courtroom prosecutor of the Technical Secretariat of the Prosecution Ministry. He is also an Academician of the Royal Academy of Jurisprudence and Legislation of Spain and of the Royal Academy of Doctors of Spain.
- His Excellency General Juan Antonio Díaz Cruz, Directorate-General for Civil Protection and Emergencies from 2012 to 2018, is the current national communication coordinator of Cáritas Military Spain.

== Monument to the Tercios ==
One of the main artistic projects of the FFD is the construction of a monument to the Tercios in Madrid. The artistic composition has been elaborated by Augusto Ferrer-Dalmau and the historical advice of experts, the sculptor Salvador Amaya has the objective of making a sculptural group, of classical inspiration, on a stone pedestal in which some of the most representative figures of those soldiers of the Spanish Golden Age: an arquebusier, a pikeman, a flag bearer and their captain. Alongside them will walk a dog, a symbol of loyalty and dedication until the end. The monument will be 2.60 meters high and will be made of lost-wax cast bronze.
