= United Nations Service Medal Korea =

United Nations Service Medal for Korea
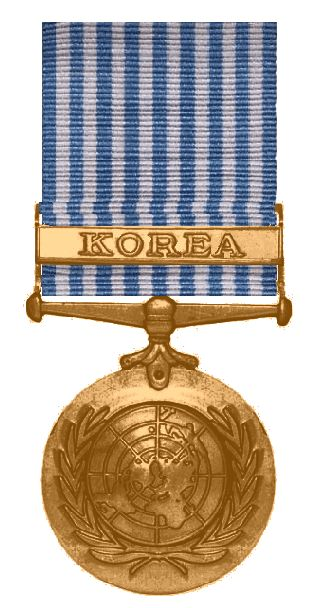
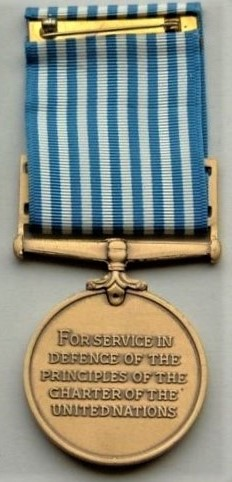
- United Nations Service Medal Korea: obverse and English language reverse
- Type: Campaign medal
- Awarded for: Campaign service
- Description: Bronze disk, 35mm diameter
- Presented by: United Nations
- Eligibility: All United Nations forces
- Campaign: Korean War 1950–53
- Established: 12 December 1950
- Service ribbon
- Related: Republic of Korea War Service Medal; Korea Medal (British Commonwealth); Korean Service Medal (United States)

The United Nations Service Medal Korea (UNSMK) is an international military decoration established by the United Nations on December 12, 1950 as the United Nations Service Medal. The decoration was the first international award ever created by the United Nations and recognized the multi-national defense forces which participated in the Korean War.

== Criteria ==
The United Nations Service Medal (Korea) is awarded to any military service member, of an Armed Force allied with South Korea, who participated in the defense of South Korea from North Korea between June 27, 1950 and July 27, 1954 for a minimum of 30 days. The military forces of the Netherlands are awarded the medal for service to January 1, 1955, while the armed forces of Thailand and Sweden grant the award to July 27, 1955.

International Red Cross personnel engaged for service during the war with any United Nations relief team in Korea were not eligible for the medal.

The ultimate award authority of the United Nations Service Medal is United Nations Commander-in-Chief of military forces in Korea. Most countries consider the United Nations Service Medal an automatic decoration, if some other Korean service award was bestowed, and generally award the medal without requesting permission through United Nations channels. For instance, in the United States Armed Forces, any service member awarded the Korean Service Medal is automatically granted the United Nations Service Medal.

== Medal name ==
On November 22, 1961, the United Nations officially changed the name of the United Nations Service Medal to the United Nations Service Medal Korea. This was as a prelude to the creation of many subsequent United Nations medals which are awarded for various operations around the world.

The United States and some other countries continue to refer to the medal as the United Nations Service Medal in an effort to maintain consistency with past military files referring to the medal by its original name.

== Description ==
The UN Korea Medal is a 36mm wide circular medal of bronze alloy. The obverse depicts the 'World-in-a Wreath' emblem of the United Nations. The reverse has the inscription: FOR SERVICE IN DEFENCE OF THE PRINCIPLES OF THE CHARTER OF THE UNITED NATIONS. Each participating country has the text in the most appropriate language, and the inscription may be in any one of the following languages:

- Amharic, awarded to personnel from the Ethiopian Empire, 5,650 medals issued
- Dutch, 5,800 medals issued
- English, awarded to personnel from Australia, Canada (English-speaking), Denmark, New Zealand, Norway, Philippines, Sweden, United Kingdom, Union of South Africa and United States of America, 2,760,000 medals issued
- French, awarded to personnel from Belgium, Canada (French-speaking), France and Luxembourg, 16,900 medals awarded
- Greek, 9,000 medals issued
- Italian, 135 medals issued
- Korean, 1,225,000 medals issued
- Spanish, awarded to personnel from Colombia, 1.300 medals issued
- Thai, 10,650 medals issued
- Turkish, 33,700 medals issued
- An unknown number of an unofficial copy with inscriptions in Tagalog were produced in the Philippines for local veterans.

The medal hangs from a claw attachment on a straight bar suspension. Each medal is worn with a medal bar bearing the inscription KOREA in the same language as the reverse inscription. The medal's ribbon made up of 17 equal stripes of United Nations blue (Bluebird 67117) and white, 9 blue and 8 white, each 5/64 inch (2.0 mm) wide, with the exception of the Turkish medals that were usually worn with a dark red, single colour ribbon, as the standard pale blue and white were too similar to the Flag of Greece, considered as a rival country.

== See also ==
- Awards and decorations of the Armed Forces of the Philippines
- United Nations Medal
- Korean War Service Medal, South Korea
- Korea Medal, British and Commonwealth Forces.
- Canadian Volunteer Service Medal for Korea, Canada.
- Korean Service Medal, United States
- Korea Defense Service Medal, United States
