= Multinational Force and Observers Medal =

International military decoration

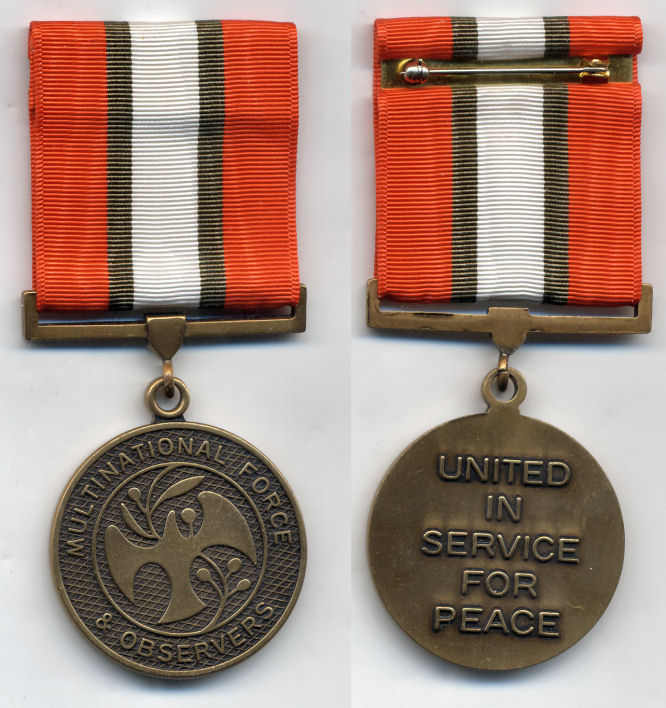
- MFO medal
- Type: Military medal Campaign medal
- Awarded for: 170 days service
- Presented by: Multinational Force and Observers
- Eligibility: Members of the MFO team
- Status: Active
- Established: March 24, 1982
- Ribbon for the Multinational Force and Observers Medal

Precedence
- Next (higher): Varies by country
- Next (lower): Varies by country
- Related: MFO Civilian Medal; MFO Director General's Award

The Multinational Force and Observers Medal is an international military decoration which was first created on March 24, 1982. The medal was established under the authority of the Director-General of the Multinational Force and Observers (MFO) which were established to monitor a neutral ceasefire zone, between Egypt and Israel, as the result of the Yom Kippur War of 1973.

== Criteria ==
Eligibility for initial award of the MFO Service Medal will be six months (minimum 170 days) of honorable duty. However, eligibility for the initial award will be considered satisfied in the event that:

- The award is to be made posthumously
- The Member is medically repatriated due to MFO service-incurred injury or illness
- The Member completes a contingent tour of less than six months, as agreed between the Director General and the respective Participating State.

== Clasps and Bars ==
Silver numerals, beginning with numeral '2', worn on the medal ribbon are awarded for additional periods of service with the same or subsequent missions. Upon reception of a Force Commander's Commendation, an additional pin displaying the MFO Symbol will be authorized for wear on the medal ribbon.

== Manner of wear ==
=== Australian Defence Force ===
The Multinational Force and Observers Medal is authorized to be worn as a foreign medal for the Australian Defence Force (ADF). The medal is worn after Australian medals, with other foreign awards, in the order of date of receipt.

=== British Armed Forces ===
Prior to 2017, The Multinational Force and Observers Medal could not be worn by British Forces personnel. However, in 2017 authority was given for the medal to be worn alongside other British awards and medals but being a foreign medal, is to be worn after all other British medals. The authority to wear the medal has been given retrospectively to all those who served for 170 days or more with the MFO since 1982.

=== Canadian Forces ===
The Multinational Force and Observers Medal is considered an authorized medal within the International Mission Medals category (located after NATO Awards and before Commemorative Awards) for the Canadian Forces (CF). Its order of precedence within the International Missions Medals category is based on date of award (1982–present) and may be worn directly after the International Commission of Control and Supervision Medal (1973) and before the European Community Monitor Mission Medal for Yugoslavia (1991).

=== New Zealand Defence Force ===
The Multinational Force and Observers Medal is considered an authorized medal for the New Zealand Defence Force (NZDF) within the Foreign Medals category, the last category in the New Zealand order of precedence. The MFO Medal is worn directly after the Kuwait Liberation Medal and the Korean War Service Medal.

=== United States Armed Forces ===
The United States military began issuing the Multinational Force and Observers Medal on July 28, 1982. The medal was made retroactive to August 1981 and was presented to any United States service member who served at least ninety cumulative days as a member of the Multinational Force and Observers. On March 15, 1985, the time period was increased to a minimum of 170 days. The time frame could be waived if the award was presented posthumously, a service member was medically evacuated from the region, or if the Director-General of the Multinational Force and Observers presented the award for a specific act or special case.

The Multinational Force and Observers Medal is authorized for wear as a United States military award under the category of "Non-U.S. service award" and is worn after all U.S. decorations and before foreign awards of individual countries. Multiple presentations are denoted by award numerals. Similar international military decorations include the NATO Service Medals and the United Nations Service Medals.

== Precedence ==
Some orders of precedence are as follows:

Country	Preceding	Following
(Canada) Canada; Order of precedence	International Commission of Control and Supervision Medal	European Community Monitor Mission Medal
(United States) United States; Order of precedence	NATO Medal	Inter-American Defense Board Medal
