= Castle of Santa Catalina (Cádiz) =

- Baluarte de Santa Catalina y Castillo (Spanish)
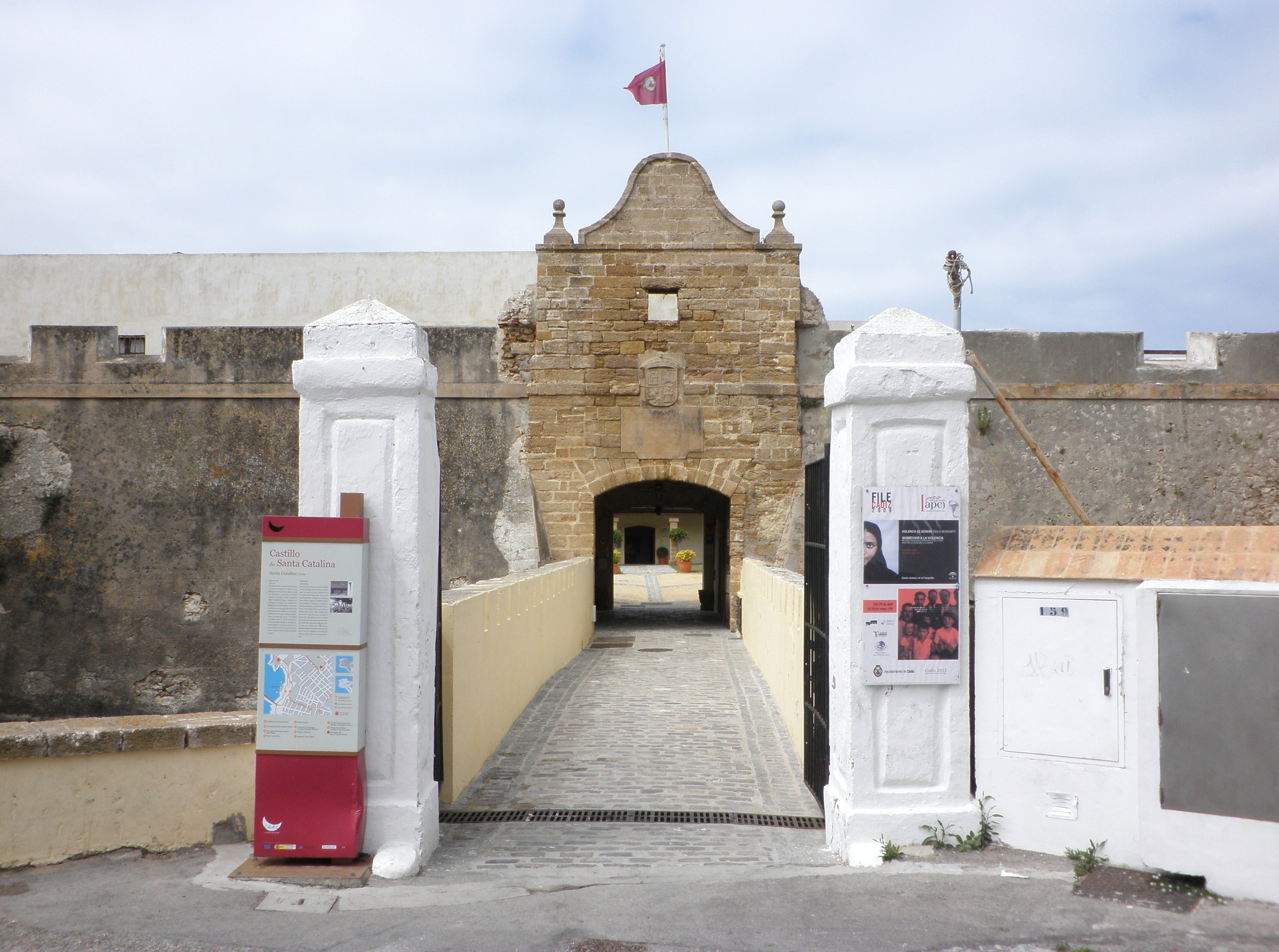

- Location within Spain
- 36.532725°N 6.30805°W
- Location: Cádiz, Spain

Spanish Cultural Heritage
- Official name: Baluarte de Santa Catalina y Castillo
- Type: Non-movable
- Criteria: Monument
- Designated: 1993
- Reference no.: RI-51-0007571

The Castle of Santa Catalina (Spanish: Baluarte de Santa catalina y Castillo) is a castle located in Cádiz, Spain. It was declared Bien de Interés Cultural in 1993.
