= Serge Lazareff Prize =

International military award

Serge Lazareff Medal
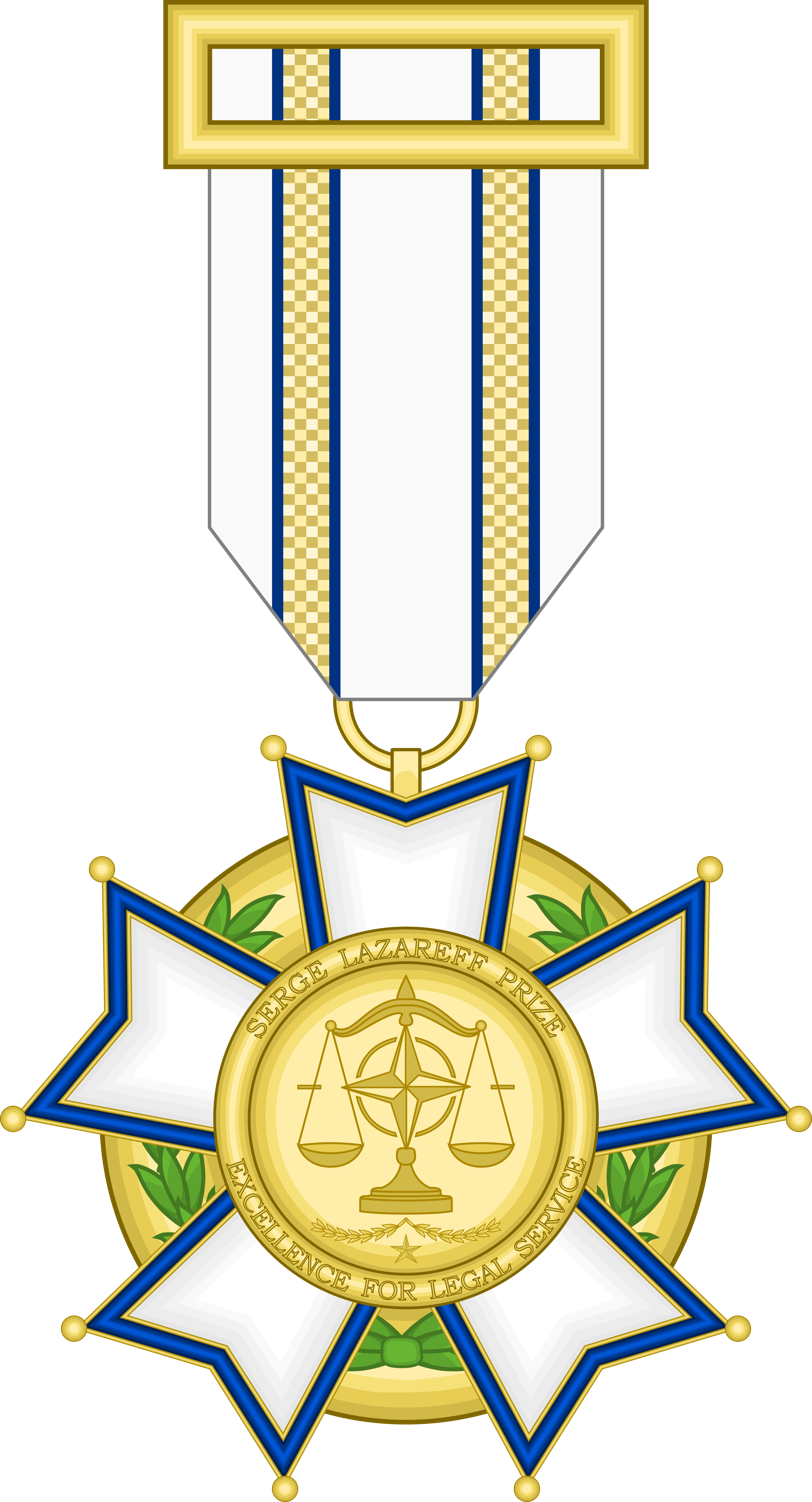
- Serge Lazareff Medal Star
- Type: International military decoration
- Awarded for: Outstanding contribution to the activities of the NATO ACO Office of Legal Affairs.
- Presented by: North Atlantic Treaty Organization (NATO)
- Eligibility: Military and civilian personnel
- Motto: EXCELLENCE FOR LEGAL SERVICE
- Status: Currently awarded
- Established: 2017

The Serge Lazareff Medal is an international decoration given to civilians and military personnel within the framework of the Office of Legal Affairs of the Supreme Headquarters Allied Powers Europe of the North Atlantic Treaty Organization.

== Background ==
The Serge Lazareff Medal was created in 2017 to recognize all those people who, both engaged with NATO and from outside the organisation, for their outstanding contribution to NATO ACO Office of Legal Affairs, as well as all those who have contributed to supporting or develop knowledge of their legal position. The medal is named in honor of the prestigious jurist, academician and NATO lawyer, Serge Lazareff, who played a significant role in developing the NATO Status of Forces Agreement.

== Types and categories ==
There are five different Serge Lazareff Medaltypes:

- Grand Star.
- Commander.
- Star.
- Certificate of Recognition.
- Long service, belongs to the extraordinary category, for long-term legal staff who have served in any of the Legal Offices of the Allied Command of Operations.

There are two different categories:

- Ordinary, where we can distinguish four subcategories.
  - Individual.
  - With distinction, individual.
  - Collective.
  - Honorific.
- Extraordinary.

The Serge Lazareff Medal is usually presented by the Director of the NATO ACO Office of Legal Affairs, a position currently held by the spanish Mr. Andrés B. Muñoz Mosquera.

== Insignia and ribbons ==
Serge Lazareff Medal

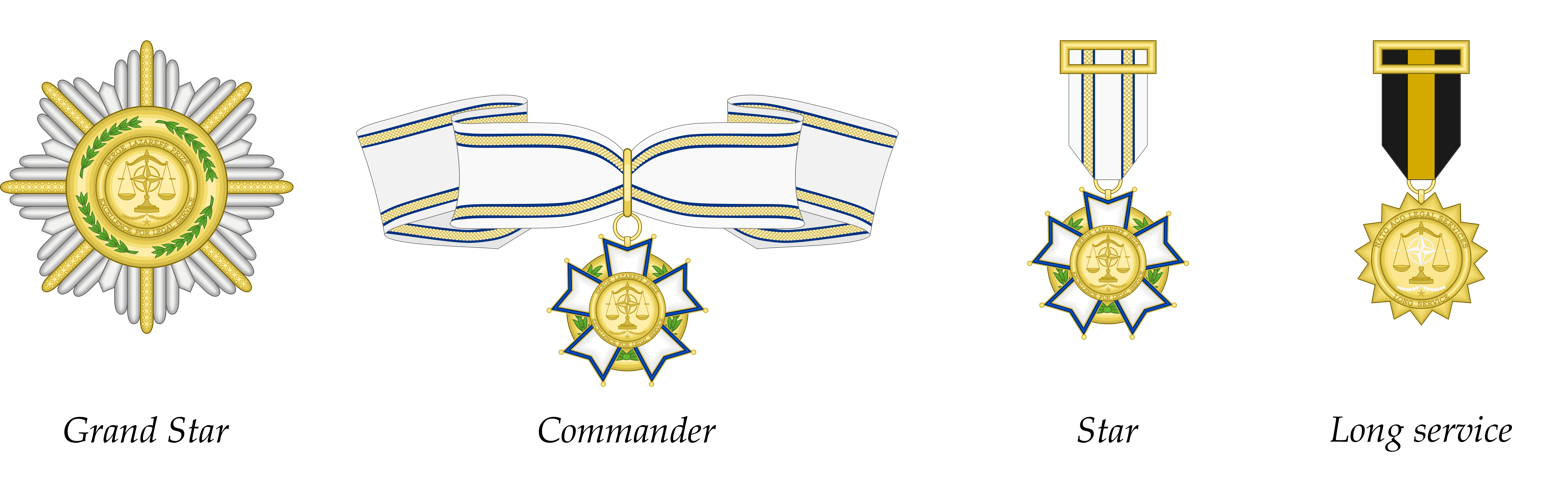

Ribbons

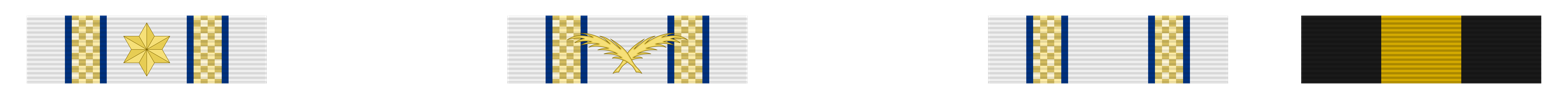

== See also ==
- North Atlantic Treaty Organization
- Supreme Headquarters Allied Powers Europe
- Allied Command Operations
- International decoration
- Orders, decorations, and medals of Spain
- NATO Medal
