= MFO Civilian Medal =

Multinational Force and Observers Civilian Medal
- MFO Civilian medal
- Type: Military medal Campaign medal
- Awarded for: 360 days service
- Presented by: Multinational Force and Observers
- Eligibility: Civilian members of the MFO team
- Status: Active
- Established: March 24, 1982
- Ribbon for the Multinational Force and Observers Civilian Medal
- Related: Multinational Force and Observers Medal; MFO Director General's Award

Civilian employees working for the Multinational Force and Observers mission in the Sinai are authorized the MFO Civilian Medal in recognition of their service in the cause of peace.

== History ==
Established March 24, 1982, this award recognizes those civilians who have served with the MFO in the Sinai. The medal is similar to the Multinational Force and Observers Medal presented to peacekeepers of the 11 contingents which serve in the force. Civilians are employed in a variety of jobs, primarily services and administration. Like the medals issued by the United Nations, the medals of the MFO are not issued by a government; the Multinational Force and Observers is an international organization which answers to its headquarters in Rome and to the two interested parties, Egypt and Israel.

== Criteria ==
The MFO Civilian Service Medal is awarded to MFO Civilian staff members not eligible for the MFO Medal, and to members of the prime Sinai Support Contractor staff in recognition of honorable service at any MFO location. Eligibility for this award will be the satisfactory completion of 12 months (minimum 360 days) of contract service with the MFO in any of its installations. However, eligibility will be considered satisfied in the event that, the award is made posthumously, or the member becomes medically unfit for further service with the MFO or the prime Sinai Support Contractor due to service-incurred injuries or illness.
