= MFO Director General's Award =

Multinational Force and Observers Director General's Award
- MFO Director General's Award ribbon bar
- Awarded for: Outstanding service or action on behalf of the MFO
- Presented by: Multinational Force and Observers
- Eligibility: Civilian and military members of the MFO team
- Status: Active
- Established: October 1986
- Related: Multinational Force and Observers Medal; MFO Civilian Medal

The Multinational Force and Observers Director General's Award is presented to both military peacekeepers and civilians for outstanding service or action on behalf of the MFO. The first recipient was a posthumous award to Director General Leamon Hunt.

== Criteria ==
The award may be presented by the Director General to an MFO member, military or civilian, or any other individual deemed appropriate by him, whose overall excellence of performance and/or unique contribution significantly advances the purpose and achievement of the MFO mission. As a general rule, no more than three such medals will be awarded annually. TO be considered eligible, the nominee should have made an exceptional contribution to the MFO, above and beyond the normal and reasonable professional expectations of the position function or relationship to the MFO, as the case may be, in any of the following areas:

- Achievement of outstanding results in increased productivity, increased efficiency, and economy of operations which resulted in a significant contribution of the furtherance of the MFO mission.
- Demonstration of exceptional leadership or professional competence in attaining and exceeding MFO goals
- Achievement and innovation in the areas of management operations or support within the MFO
- Particularly for non-MFO recipients, provision of outstanding service to, or support of, the MFO mission of peace.

== Award ==
The award consists of an inscribed MFO medal suspended from a ribbon, 1 3/8 inches wide of white colour with 1/16 inch borders and 3/16 center stripe of MFO orange color between two 3/16 inch green stripes, an accompanying miniature, lapel pin, and a certificate signed by the Director General.

== See also ==
Multinational Force and Observers
