= NATO Medal =

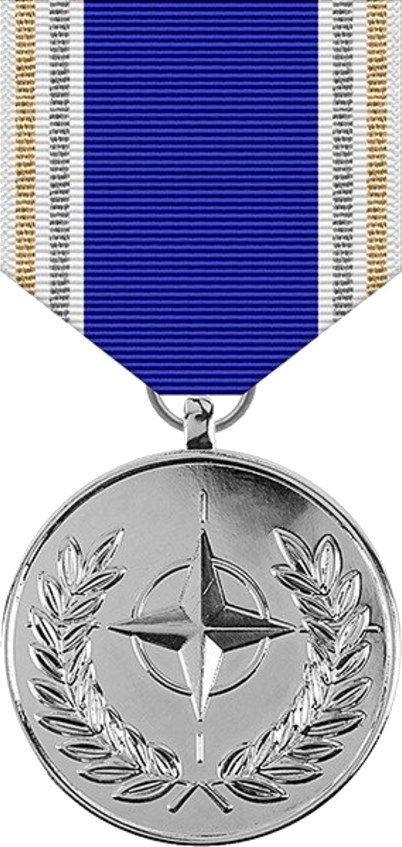
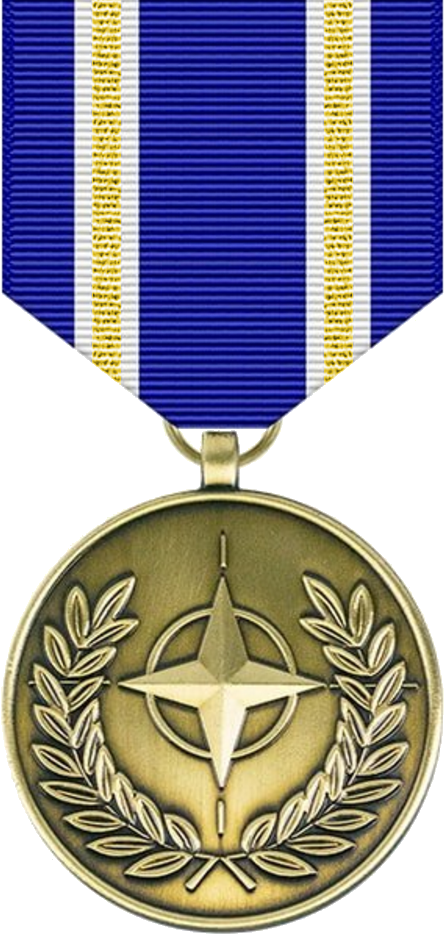
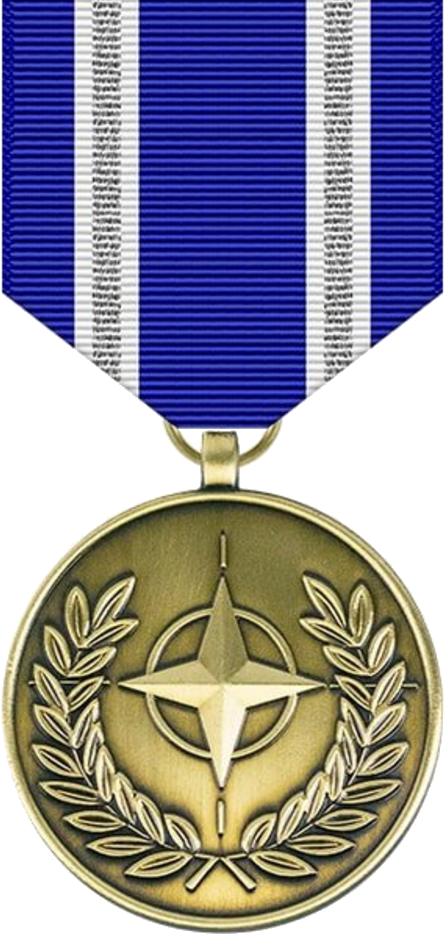
- From left to right: The NATO Meritorious Service Medal (U.S.-spec.), the Article 5 NATO Medal (U.S.-spec), and the Non-Article 5 NATO Medal (U.S.-spec).
- Type: Military medal Service medal
- Awarded for: 30 days of either cumulative or consecutive service in Afghanistan as a NATO military service member (ISAF)
- Presented by: the North Atlantic Treaty Organization
- Eligibility: Military service members and NATO civilian employees (NATO Meritorious Service Medal)
- Status: Currently awarded (Operation Active Endeavour, Balkans, Africa, Resolute Support Mission, NATO Meritorious Service Medal)
- Established: January 2015 (Resolute Support Mission); July 2012 (Libya and Africa); July 2006 (ISAF); 2003 (Meritorious Service Medal); July 1996 (U.S.)
- First award: Retroactive to January 2003 (Balkans); Retroactive to June 2003 (ISAF)
- U.S.-spec Article 5 ribbon bar (left) and U.S.-spec Non-Article 5 ribbon bar (right)

Precedence
- Next (higher): United Nations Medal (U.S.)
- Next (lower): Multinational Force and Observers Medal (U.S.)
- Related: Afghanistan Campaign Medal (U.S.)

The NATO Medal is an international military decoration which is awarded to various militaries of the world under the authority of the North Atlantic Treaty Organization (NATO). It is manufactured by Eekelers-Centini Intl, of Hemiksem, Belgium.

== Background ==
The NATO Medal was first established in 1996 to recognize individuals who had served in the Implementation Force (IFOR) as part of Operation Joint Endeavor in Former Yugoslavia. A new ribbon was established in 1999 for participants in Operation Allied Force in Kosovo. As NATO operations became more common, different ribbons were established for each operation.

In early 2003 NATO settled on only three ribbon styles - one for the NATO Meritorious Service Medal, one for Article 5 operations, and one for non-Article 5 operations. Participation in specific operations is distinguished by bars worn on the ribbons with the name of the operation. This change affects those who began a tour of duty after 2 December 2002. As a result, an individual who began his or her tour of duty in one of the Balkan NATO operational areas after 2 December 2002 will qualify only for the Non-Article 5 medal for the Balkans.

== Regulations for wear ==
United States Armed Forces regulations do not permit the wearing of operation bars on the NATO Medal ribbon. Instead, the recipient wears the ribbon without a bar attached to it. In the event that a U.S. service member is entitled to more than one NATO medal, they wear the ribbon of the first NATO medal they received and the appropriate number of bronze service stars to indicate the number of NATO medals they have been awarded. For example - a service member who served in Former Yugoslavia, Kosovo and ISAF in Afghanistan would wear the Former Yugoslavia ribbon with one bronze service star to denote the award of the second NATO medal.

In contrast, the Armed Forces of the United Kingdom permit a service member to wear most of the NATO medals they are entitled to, provided that the operation the NATO Medal is awarded for is not recognized by another medal awarded by the United Kingdom. The NATO Africa medal and NATO Training Mission Iraq may not be worn by UK service persons.

== Versions of the NATO Medal ==
There are currently eighteen versions of the NATO Medal in existence, three unique ribbons for service in the former Yugoslavia, Kosovo, North Macedonia, two unique ribbons for service on Article 5 operations Eagle Assist and Active Endeavour (originally with Article 5 bar, later with Active Endeavour bar), a unique ribbon for Non-Article 5 operations in the Balkans (with Non-Article 5 bar), and twelve different bars for the standardized post-2003 Non-Article 5 operations ribbon: Balkans (replacing the previous Non-Article 5 medal), ISAF, NTM-IRAQ, AMIS, Pakistan, Africa, OUP-Libya, Afghanistan, Sea Guardian, NTCB-Iraq, NM-Iraq, and Vigilance. In addition, there is also a NATO Meritorious Service Medal, with a "Meritorious Service" clasp as well. However, U.S. military personnel do not wear the clasps on the NATO Medals, since the U.S. has its own devices that are used instead.

== NATO Meritorious Service Medal ==
The NATO Meritorious Service Medal (MSM) was first awarded in 2003 to commend NATO staff whose personal initiative and dedication went beyond their duty to make a difference both to their colleagues, and to NATO as an organisation. The Medal is the personal award of the Secretary General of NATO, who signs each citation. Although authorized up to 150, fewer medals are awarded each year and it remains the only significant award for individual personal effort for NATO staff; this Medal can be awarded to military and civilian staff alike. When assessing nominations for the award, there are several criteria taken into consideration: the performance of acts of courage in difficult or dangerous circumstances; showing exceptional leadership or personal example; making an outstanding individual contribution to a NATO sponsored programme or activity; or enduring particular hardship or deprivation in the interest of NATO. The NATO Meritorious Service Medal is now authorized for wear on U.S., Canadian and British military uniforms.

For Canadian and U.S. military members, the NATO MSM is considered a foreign personal decoration and would be placed in the order of receipt within that category, followed by foreign unit awards, then non-U.S. service and campaign awards (such as the standard NATO Medal). This arrangement may lead to some U.S. military personnel with the NATO MSM separated by the United Nations Medal from the standard NATO Medal. As it is a personal foreign decoration, the NATO MSM is the only NATO medal that can be worn concurrently with the standard NATO Medal.

== NATO Medal service and campaign versions ==
To differentiate between the versions of the NATO Medal, originally a different ribbon pattern scheme was used for each of the decorations. The NATO Medal for Yugoslavia service consists of a blue ribbon with two thin white stripes on each side, very similar in appearance to the United Nations Medal. The NATO Medal for Kosovo service appears as a mixed blue and white striped ribbon, with white stripes on the side as well as a wide white central stripe. The NATO Medal for North Macedonia service appears as a blue and white mixed ribbon with four white stripes. The Article 5 NATO Medal for Operation Eagle Assist has a blue background with a thin central golden stripe surrounded by white stripes. The Article 5 Medal for Operation Active Endeavour has a blue background with two thin golden colored stripes surrounded by white stripes. The Non-Article 5 Medal for the Balkans operations consists of a blue background with a central silver stripe surrounded by white stripes. Beginning in 2003, all medals for Non-Article 5 operations consist of a blue background with two silver stripes surrounded by white stripes, and the operation is denoted with a bar on the ribbon.

The NATO Meritorious Service Medal consists of a blue background with gold, silver and three narrow white stripes on each outer most portion of the ribbon, and the medallion color is changed from bronze in appearance to a silver medallion for this medal only. All medals except North Macedonia's NATO Medal have corresponding campaign clasps, however some militaries (such as the United States) prohibit the wearing of the medal with a clasp and instead authorize service stars for wear on any NATO Medal while wearing any US military uniform (although the various clasps may be accepted from NATO and retained by the service member as a memento).

For the U.S. military, a bronze service star indicates additional awards of the service and mission-related NATO Medals. As of May 2013, only the NATO MSM ribbon bar (as a personal foreign decoration) and the basic NATO ribbon (as a non-US service and campaign medal) may be worn for U.S. services (at least this is true for the U.S. Army). The basic NATO Medal ribbon bar worn will be the first NATO campaign medal awarded, with subsequent campaigns indicated with a bronze service star. Most military services besides the U.S. will allow multiple service and mission-related NATO medal decorations to be worn simultaneously as they are considered separate awards.

NATO medals authorized for wear include the NATO Medal for Former Yugoslavia, the NATO Medal for Kosovo Service, both of the Article 5 Medals, the Non-Article 5 medals for the Balkans and Afghanistan (ISAF), The NATO Meritorious Service Medal and the North Macedonia NATO Medal and the Non-Article 5 Medal for service in Iraq, under the NTM-I.

The reverse of the medals state "IN SERVICE OF PEACE AND FREEDOM" in English and French, as well as the full name of NATO in English and French. The ribbon bar and suspension bar are both chiefly blue, specifically Reflex Blue on the Pantone Matching System.

Currently awarded

NATO Meritorious Service Medal

NATO Non-Article 5 medal for the Balkans (2003–)

NATO Non-Article 5 medal for Africa (2008–)

NATO Non-article 5 medal for Operation Sea Guardian (2016–)

NATO Non-Article 5 Medal for NATO Mission Iraq (2018–)

NATO Non-Article 5 Vigilance Medal (2022–)
Previously awarded

NATO medal for the former Yugoslavia (1992–2002)

NATO medal for Kosovo (1998–2002)

NATO Medal for Macedonia (2001–2002)

NATO Article 5 medal for Operation Eagle Assist (2001–2002)

NATO Article 5 medal for Operation Active Endeavour (2001–2016)

Former design for NATO Non-Article 5 medal for the Balkans (2003–2009)

NATO Non-Article 5 medal for ISAF (2003–2014)

NATO Non-Article 5 medal for NTM-Iraq (2004–2011)

NATO Non-Article 5 medal for AMIS (2005–2007)

NATO Non-Article 5 medal for Pakistan earthquake relief (2005–2006)

NATO Non-Article 5 medal for Operation Unified Protector (2011)

NATO Non-article 5 medal for Operation Resolute Support (2015–2021)

=== Non-Article 5 Medal ===
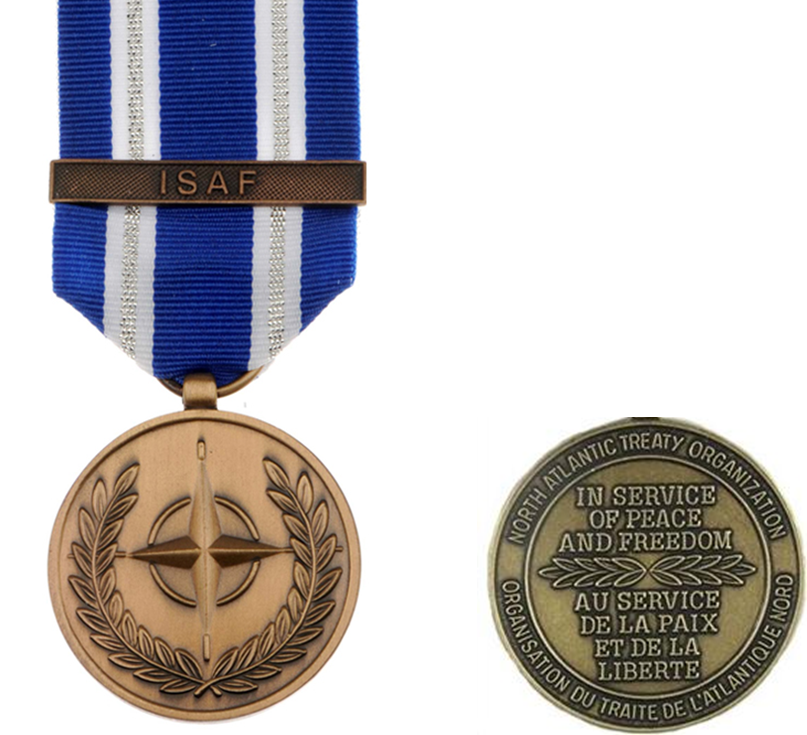
The NATO ISAF medal

For U.S. forces, eligibility for the Non-Article 5 Medal for the Balkans remains the same as those previous NATO medals with the exception of the dates of service. Those members entering the Balkan theatre on or after 1 January 2003 will be eligible for the Non-Article 5 medal. The service must be 30 days either continuous or accumulated. Aircrew members will accumulate one day of service for the first sortie during any day of the operation. Additional sorties on the same day will receive no further credit. The Balkans area is delineated as the political boundaries and airspace of Bosnia and Herzegovina, Croatia, Yugoslavia (including Kosovo), the Republic of North Macedonia, and Albania, based on the detailed description contained in the SFOR, KFOR, and Task Force Fox Operational Plans. Service members who are entitled to more than one NATO medal during the same period will only be awarded one NATO Medal. The NATO chain of command will deem which medal is appropriate. This medal may also be awarded with the "ISAF" clasp for service in Afghanistan, as well as the "NTM-I" clasp for service in Iraq with NATO forces.

For U.S. forces the eligibility for the Non-Article 5 Medal for service with the ISAF is thus: those who are members of units or staffs as set out in the Joint Operations Area taking part in operations in Afghanistan. The area of eligibility is delineated by ISAF's political boundaries. The service must be a minimum of 30 days either continuous or accumulated, from 1 June 2003 to 31 December 2014. Effective 1 January 2015, service members receive the Non-Article 5 Medal for service in Afghanistan for the Resolute Support mission. The medal is awarded with the "Afghanistan" clasp. The British government does not allow its personnel to accept or wear the medal, as a separate British Operational Service Medal for Afghanistan has been issued and, due to a long-standing ruling, British personnel are not allowed to wear two medals for the same campaign or operation. NATO campaign medals where a British decoration has not been issued, such as the award for Operation Unified Protector, may be worn.

On 24 July 2012, the United States Department of Defense announced that NATO medals for operations in Libya and Africa have been approved for acceptance and wear by eligible U.S. service members and DOD civilian personnel.

== See also ==
- Peacekeeping
- IFOR
- SFOR
- Kosovo Force
- Serge Lazareff Prize
